= List of British Commonwealth Air Training Plan facilities in Canada =

British Commonwealth Air Training Plan in Canada
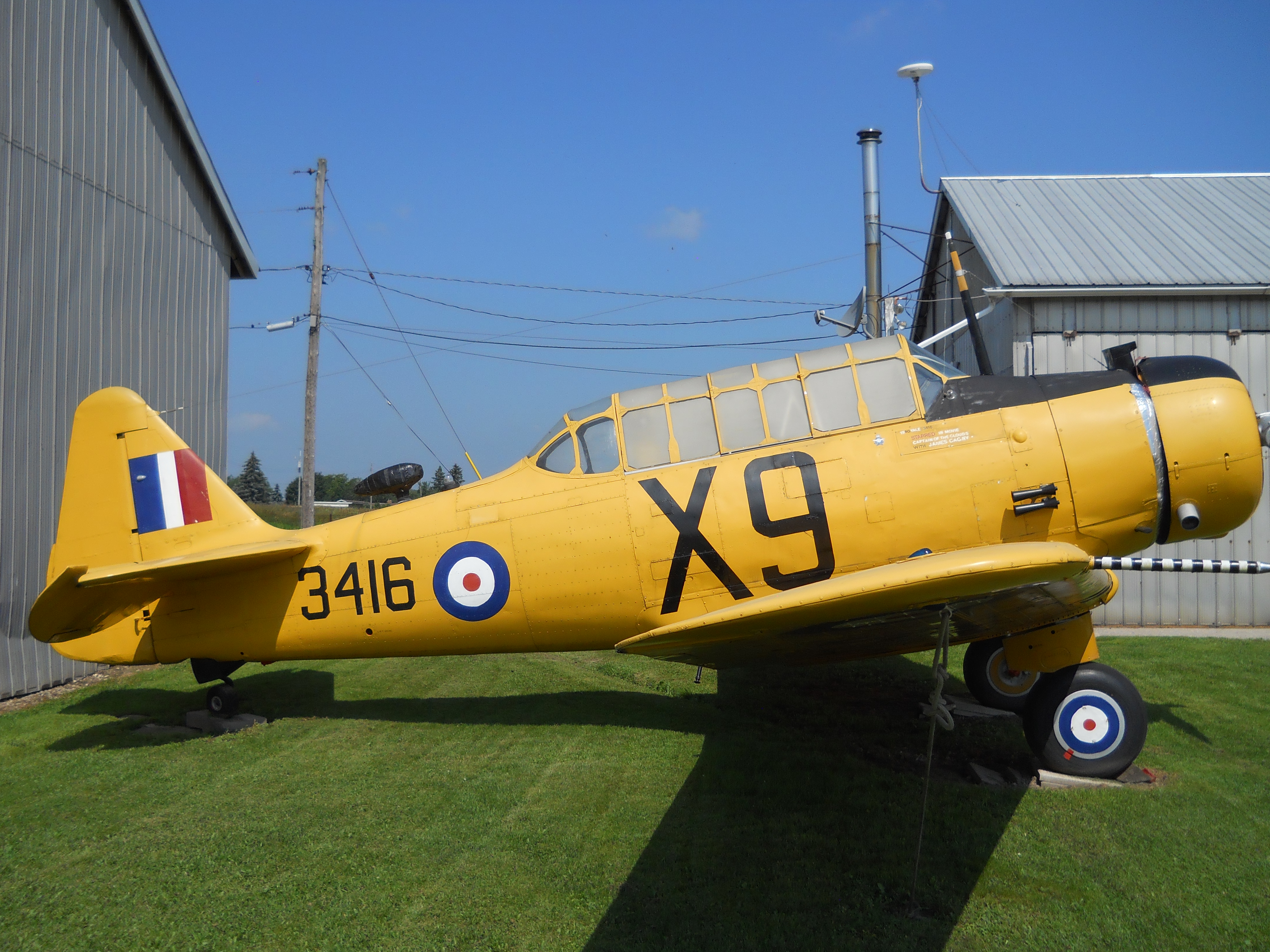
- North American Yale (W/T) from No. 4 WS
- Active: 1939–1945
- Country: Canada
- Branch: Royal Canadian Air Force; Royal Air Force
- Role: Aircrew and groundcrew training
- Part of: British Commonwealth Air Training Plan
- Aircraft: Airspeed Oxford; Avro Anson; Boeing Stearman; Bristol Bolingbroke; PBY Canso; Consolidated B-24 Liberator; Consolidated PBY Catalina Cessna Crane; Douglas Digby; De Havilland Tiger Moth; Fairchild Argus; Fairchild Cornell; Fairey Battle; Fairey Swordfish; Fleet Finch; Fleet Fort; Handley Page Halifax; Handley Page Hampden; Hawker Hurricane; Lockheed Hudson; Noorduyn Norseman; North American B-25 Mitchell; North American Harvard; North American Yale; Northrop Nomad; Stinson 105 Supermarine Walrus; Westland Lysander
- Engagements: World War II

This article contains a List of Facilities of the British Commonwealth Air Training Plan (BCATP) in Canada. The BCATP was a major program for training Allied air crews during the Second World War that was administered by the Government of Canada, and commanded by the Royal Canadian Air Force with the assistance of a board of representatives from the United Kingdom, Australia, New Zealand and Canada.

Schools and facilities were set up at 231 locations across Canada. Many of these facilities were airfields, and some were existing airports like the Edmonton Municipal Airport. In December 1939, the Canadian government identified 24 existing airfields that could be used, leaving 80 new ones to be built. Classroom facilities with residences were commandeered from universities, colleges, and other provincial institutions. Basic training facilities were commandeered from private schools and municipal governments. These "borrowed" facilities were augmented with new construction as required. (Note: For example, Wireless Schools required a shooting range. At No. 4 WS in Guelph, an "armament building" was constructed on the Ontario Agricultural College grounds.)

== Planning and operation of facilities ==
There were four phases to the acquisition, construction, and operation of BCATP facilities:

- the beginning as specified in the Riverdale Agreement of 17 December 1939
- an expansion as a result of the move of RAF facilities to Canada starting in July 1940 (Note: After the Fall of France the British government decided to move RAF assets out of the United Kingdom to Canada together with their RAF personnel. The first unit to move was No. 7 Service Flying Training School from Peterborough, England, which sailed for Canada on 29 August 1940. No. 7 re-opened on 7 October 1940 at Kingston, Ontario as No. 31 SFTS. All the RAF schools moved to Canada were given numbers with "31" or above to distinguish them from the original BCATP schools. The RCAF controlled their administration and operations. Starting in 1942 the RAF schools officially became part of the BCATP)

An example of this is the Elementary Flying Training School at De Winton, Alberta. It began as a transplanted RAF school run by RAF personnel. It opened on 18 June 1941 as No. 31 EFTS. On 13 July 1942, it was taken over by the Toronto Flying Club under contract to the RCAF.

- an expansion as a result of the Ottawa conference of May and June 1942
- closures as a result of the decision to begin winding down in November 1943 and terminate the plan on 29 March 1945

BCATP activities were managed through four Training Commands. Each command was responsible for activities in a region of Canada:

- No. 1 Toronto, Ontario, (Note: Headquarters was at Prudential House, 55 York St., Toronto) covered southern Ontario
- No. 2 Winnipeg, Manitoba, covered northwestern Ontario, all of Manitoba, and part of Saskatchewan
- No. 3 Montreal, Quebec, covered Quebec and the Maritimes
- No. 4 Regina, Saskatchewan, covered most of Saskatchewan, and all of Alberta and British Columbia: moved to Calgary, Alberta, in October 1941

== Manning Depots ==
Trainees began their military careers at a Manning Depot where they learned to bathe, shave, shine boots, polish buttons, maintain their uniforms, and otherwise behave in the required manner. There were two hours of physical education every day and instruction in marching, rifle drill, foot drill, saluting, and other routines.

Remedial high school education was offered to bring 17- and 18-year-old trainees up to the RCAF academic level. There was also a standard aptitude test: the RCAF Classification Test.

After four or five weeks, a selection committee decided whether the trainee would be placed in the aircrew or groundcrew stream. Aircrew "Wireless Air Gunner" candidates went directly to a Wireless School. "Air Observer" and "Pilot" aircrew candidates went to an Initial Training School.

Trainees were often assigned "tarmac duty" to keep busy. Some were sent to factories to count nuts and bolts; others were sent to flying schools and other RCAF facilities to guard things, clean things, paint things, and polish things. Tarmac duty could last several months or more.

The No. 1 Manning Depot in Toronto was the Coliseum Building on the Canadian National Exhibition grounds, which accommodated up to 5,000 personnel.

- No. 1 Toronto, Ontario
- No. 1a Picton, Ontario
- No. 2 Brandon, Manitoba, moved to Swift Current, Saskatchewan
- No. 2a Penhold, Alberta
- No. 3 Edmonton, Alberta
- No. 4 Quebec City, Quebec
- No. 4a Saint-Hubert, Quebec
- No. 5 Lachine, Quebec
- No. 6 Toronto, Ontario, (Note: No. 6 was opened at the original site of Havergal College, 354 Jarvis St., Toronto) (Women's Division, October 1941 – May 1942)
- No. 7 Rockcliffe, Ontario (Women's Division, Fall 1942)
- No. 8 Souris, Manitoba (4 January 1943 – 1 June 1943)

== Aircrew training facilities ==
=== Pre-Aircrew Education Detachments ===
Pre-Aircrew Education Detachments (PAED) provided academic training in mathematics, physics, English, and other subjects requested by the RCAF for potential aircrew recruits lacking the necessary education. They greatly reduced the percentage of failures at Initial Training Schools (ITS). PAED were established on university campuses across the country.

- No. 2 University of Alberta, Edmonton, Alberta
- No. 4 University of British Columbia, Vancouver, British Columbia
- No. 9 McGill University. Montreal, Quebec
- No. 15 Ontario Agricultural College, Guelph, Ontario (Note: No. 4 Wireless School administered No. 15 PAED)
- No. 18 Queen's University, Kingston, Ontario
- No. 20 University of Saskatchewan, Saskatoon, Saskatchewan
- No. 23 University of Toronto, Toronto, Ontario
- No. 25 Brandon College, Brandon, Manitoba

=== Initial Training Schools ===
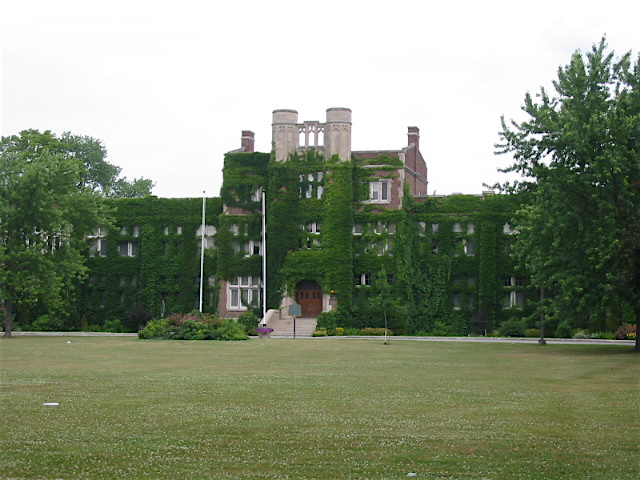
Sir James Whitney School for the Deaf. In 1941 site of No. 5 ITS, Belleville

Pilot and Air Observer candidates began their 26- or 28-week training program with four weeks at an Initial Training School (ITS). They studied theoretical subjects and were subjected to a variety of tests. Theoretical studies included navigation, theory of flight, meteorology, duties of an officer, air force administration, algebra, and trigonometry. Tests included an interview with a psychiatrist, the 4-hour-long M2 physical examination, a session in a decompression chamber, and a "test flight" in a Link Trainer, as well as academic tests. At the end of the course, the postings were announced. Occasionally candidates were re-routed to the Wireless Air Gunner stream at the end of ITS.

- No. 1 Eglinton Hunt Club, Toronto, Ontario
- No. 2 Regina College & Regina Normal School, Regina, Saskatchewan
- No. 3 Sacred Heart College, Victoriaville, Quebec
- No. 4 Edmonton Normal School, Edmonton, Alberta
- No. 5 Ontario Provincial School for the Deaf, Belleville, Ontario
- No. 6 Toronto Board of Education, Toronto, Ontario
- No. 7 Saskatoon Normal School & Bedford Road Collegiate, Saskatoon, Saskatchewan

=== Elementary Flying Training Schools ===
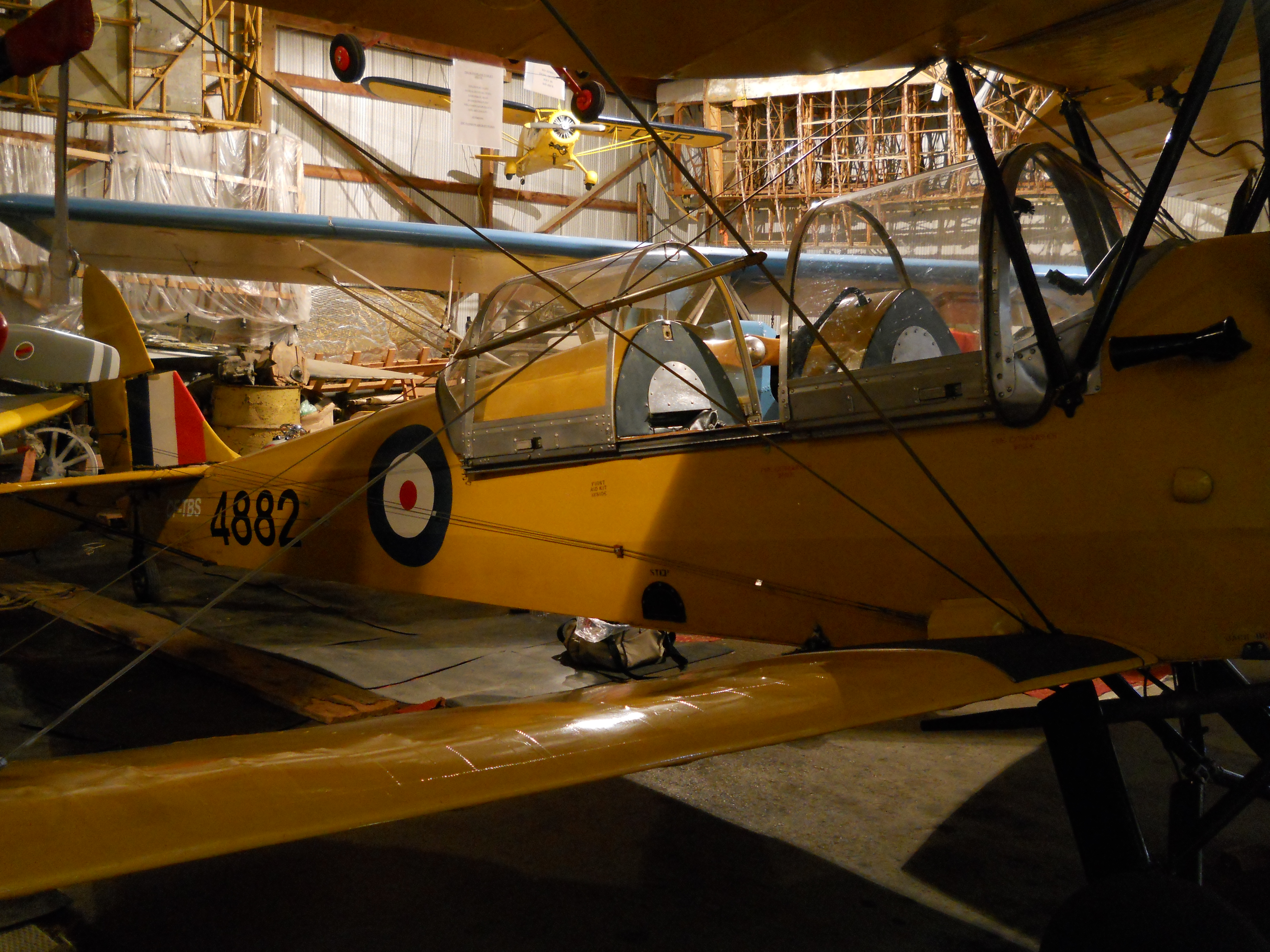
DH82C Tiger Moth basic trainer with night flying kit

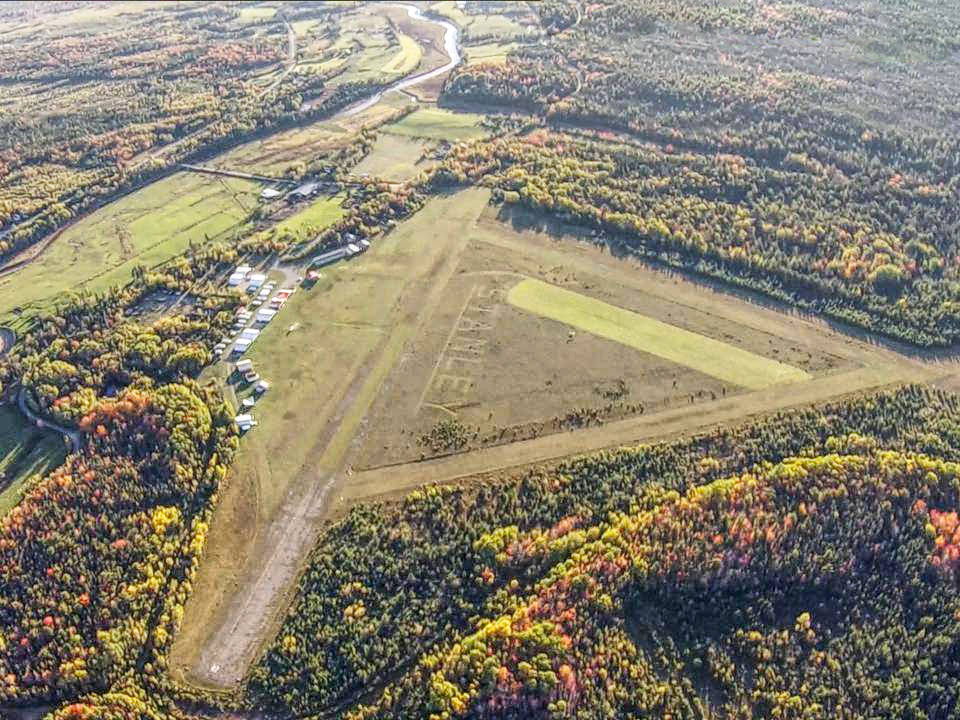
The site of No.17 EFTS in 2018

Map of Elementary Flying Training Schools

An Elementary Flying Training School (EFTS) gave a trainee 50 hours of basic flying instruction on a simple trainer like the De Havilland Tiger Moth, Fleet Finch, or Fairchild Cornell over 8 weeks. Elementary schools were operated by civilian flying clubs under contract to the RCAF, and most of the instructors were civilians. For example, No. 12 EFTS Goderich was run by the Kitchener-Waterloo Flying Club and the County of Huron Flying Club. The next step for a pilot was the Service Flying Training School.

- No. 1 Malton, Ontario (Moth)
- No. 2 Fort William, Ontario (Moth)
- No. 3 London, Ontario (Finch)
- No. 4 Windsor Mills, Quebec, (Finch and Moth) at Saint-François-Xavier-de-Brompton, Quebec 45°31′00″N 072°02′12″W
- No. 5 Lethbridge, Alberta, moved to High River, Alberta (Moth and Cornell)
- No. 6 Prince Albert, Saskatchewan (Moth and Cornell)
- No. 7 Windsor, Ontario (Finch, Cornell)
- No. 8 Vancouver, British Columbia (Moth)
- No. 9 St. Catharines, Ontario (Moth)
- No. 10 Hamilton, Ontario, moved to Pendleton, Ontario (Moth, Finch and Cornell at Pendleton) 45°29′10″N 075°05′46″W
- No. 11 Cap-de-la-Madeleine, Quebec (Finch and Cornell)
- No. 12 Goderich, Ontario (Finch)
- No. 13 St. Eugene, Ontario (Finch, Cornell) 45°29′16″N 074°28′18″W
- No. 14 Portage la Prairie, Manitoba (Moth and Finch)
- No. 15 Regina, Saskatchewan (Moth and Cornell)
- No. 16 Edmonton, Alberta (Moth and Finch)
- No. 17 Stanley, Nova Scotia (Finch and Moth)
- No. 18 Boundary Bay, British Columbia (Moth)
- No. 19 Virden, Manitoba (Moth and Cornell) 49°52′42″N 100°55′06″W
- No. 20 Oshawa, Ontario (Moth, Cornell)
- No. 21 Chatham, New Brunswick (Finch)
- No. 22 L'Ancienne-Lorette, Quebec (Finch)
- No. 23 Davidson, Saskatchewan, moved to Yorkton, Saskatchewan; operated by the RCAF. (Cornell)
- No. 24 Abbotsford, British Columbia (Cornell)
- No. 25 Assiniboia, Saskatchewan; originally No. 34 RAF (Cornell)
- No. 26 Neepawa, Manitoba; originally No. 35 RAF (Moth)
- No. 31 De Winton, Alberta (Moth, Stearman and Cornell)
- No. 32 Bowden, Alberta (Moth, Stearman and Cornell) 51°58′46″N 114°00′45″W
- No. 33 Caron, Saskatchewan (Cornell) 50°27′36″N 105°48′44″W
- No. 34 Assiniboia, Saskatchewan (Moth, Cornell)
- No. 35 Neepawa, Manitoba (Moth and Cornell) 50°13′57″N 099°30′36″W
- No. 36 Pearce, Alberta (Moth and Stearman) 49°50′10″N 113°14′30″W

=== Service Flying Training Schools ===
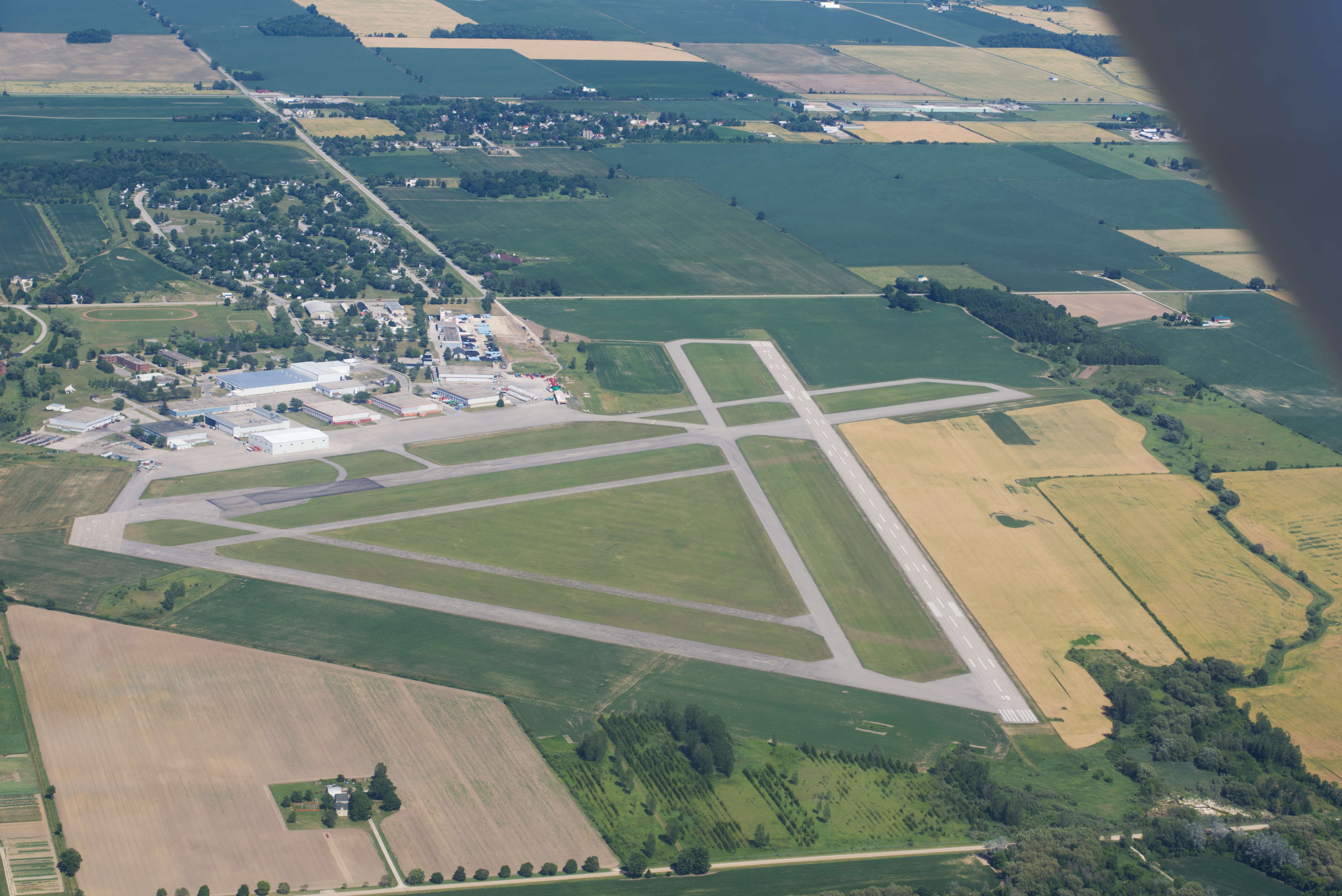
The former No. 9 SFTS Centralia in 2020

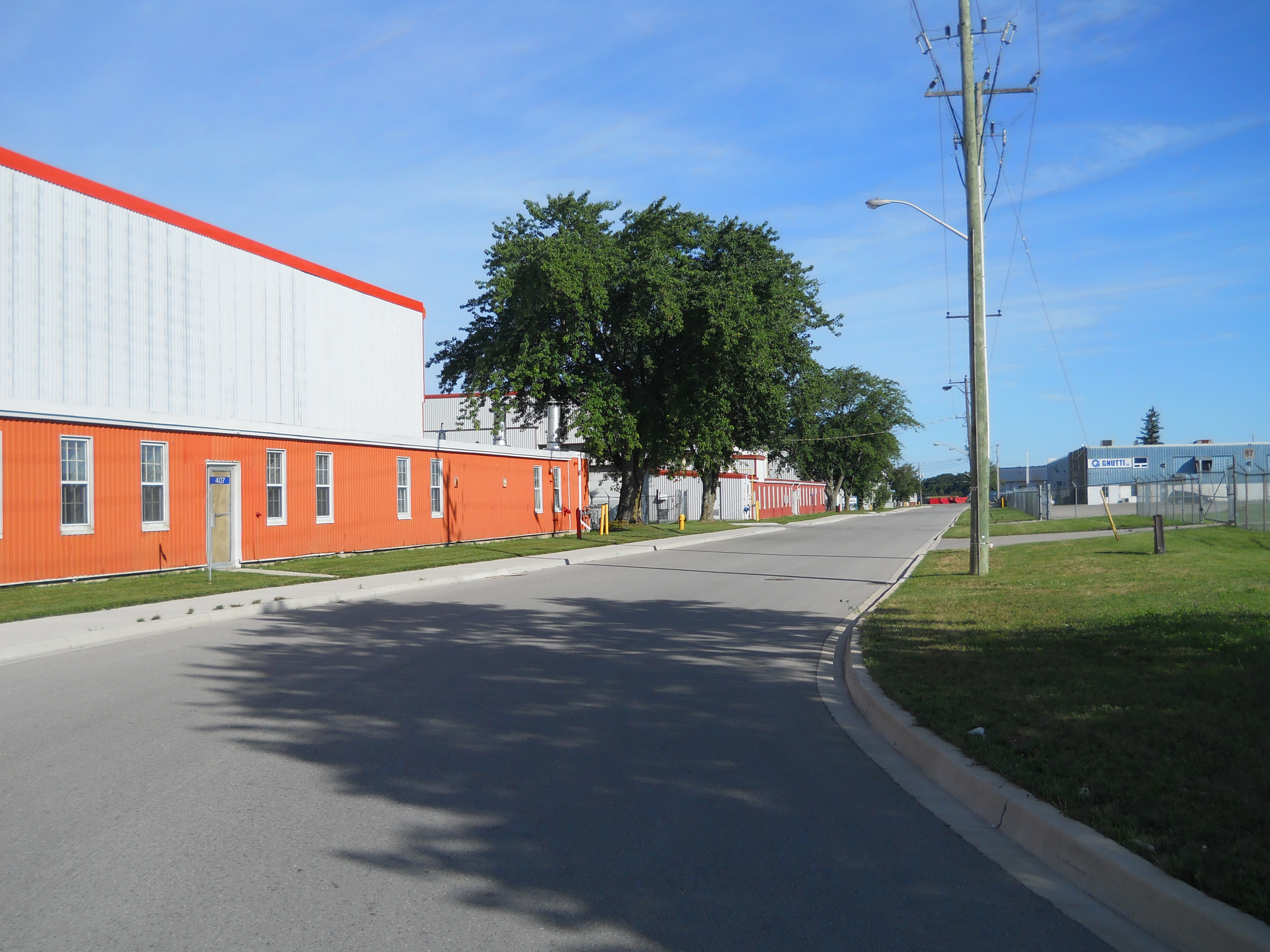
The 1942 Hangar Line at No. 9 SFTS Centralia in August 2013. #4 on the left, #1 in the distance.

Map of Service Flying Training Schools

Graduates of the EFTS "learn-to-fly" program went on to a Service Flying Training School (SFTS) for sixteen weeks. For the first eight weeks, the trainee was part of an intermediate training squadron. The next six weeks were spent in an advanced training squadron. The final two weeks of training was conducted at a Bombing & Gunnery School. The Service schools were military establishments run by the RCAF or the RAF.

There were two different types of Service Flying Training Schools. Trainees in the fighter pilot stream went to an SFTS like No. 14 Aylmer, where they trained in the North American Harvard or North American Yale. Trainees in the bomber, coastal or transport pilot stream went to an SFTS like No. 5 Brantford, where they learned multi-engine technique in an Airspeed Oxford, Avro Anson or Cessna Crane.

- No. 1 Camp Borden, Ontario (Harvard and Yale)
- No. 2 Uplands, Ontario (Harvard and Yale)
- No. 3 Calgary, Alberta (Anson and Crane)
- No. 4 Saskatoon, Saskatchewan (Yale, Anson and Crane)
- No. 5 Brantford, Ontario (Anson)
- No. 6 Dunnville, Ontario (Harvard and Yale)
- No. 7 Fort MacLeod, Alberta (Anson) 49°42′10″N 113°25′10″W
- No. 8 Moncton, New Brunswick (Anson and Harvard)
- No. 9 Summerside, Prince Edward Island, moved to Centralia, Ontario (Anson and Harvard)
- No. 10 Dauphin, Manitoba (Harvard and Crane)
- No. 11 Yorkton, Saskatchewan (Harvard, Crane and Anson)
- No. 12 Brandon, Manitoba (Crane and Anson)
- No. 13 St. Hubert, Quebec, moved to North Battleford, Saskatchewan (Harvard and Anson)
- No. 14 Aylmer, Ontario (Anson, Harvard, Yale, and Supermarine Walrus)
- No. 15 Claresholm, Alberta (Anson and Crane)
- No. 16 Hagersville, Ontario (Anson and Harvard) 42°55′35″N 080°07′12″W
- No. 17 Souris, Manitoba (Anson and Harvard)
- No. 18 Gimli, Manitoba (Anson and Harvard)
- No. 19 Vulcan, Alberta (Anson)
- No. 31 Kingston, Ontario (Battle and Harvard)
- No. 32 Moose Jaw, Saskatchewan (Harvard and Oxford)
- No. 33 Carberry, Manitoba (Anson)
- No. 34 Medicine Hat, Alberta (Harvard and Oxford)
- No. 35 North Battleford, Saskatchewan (Oxford)
- No. 36 Penhold, Alberta (Oxford)
- No. 37 Calgary, Alberta (Oxford, Harvard and Anson)
- No. 38 Estevan, Saskatchewan (Anson)
- No. 39 Swift Current, Saskatchewan (Oxford)
- No. 41 Weyburn, Saskatchewan (Anson and Harvard)

=== Air Observer Schools ===
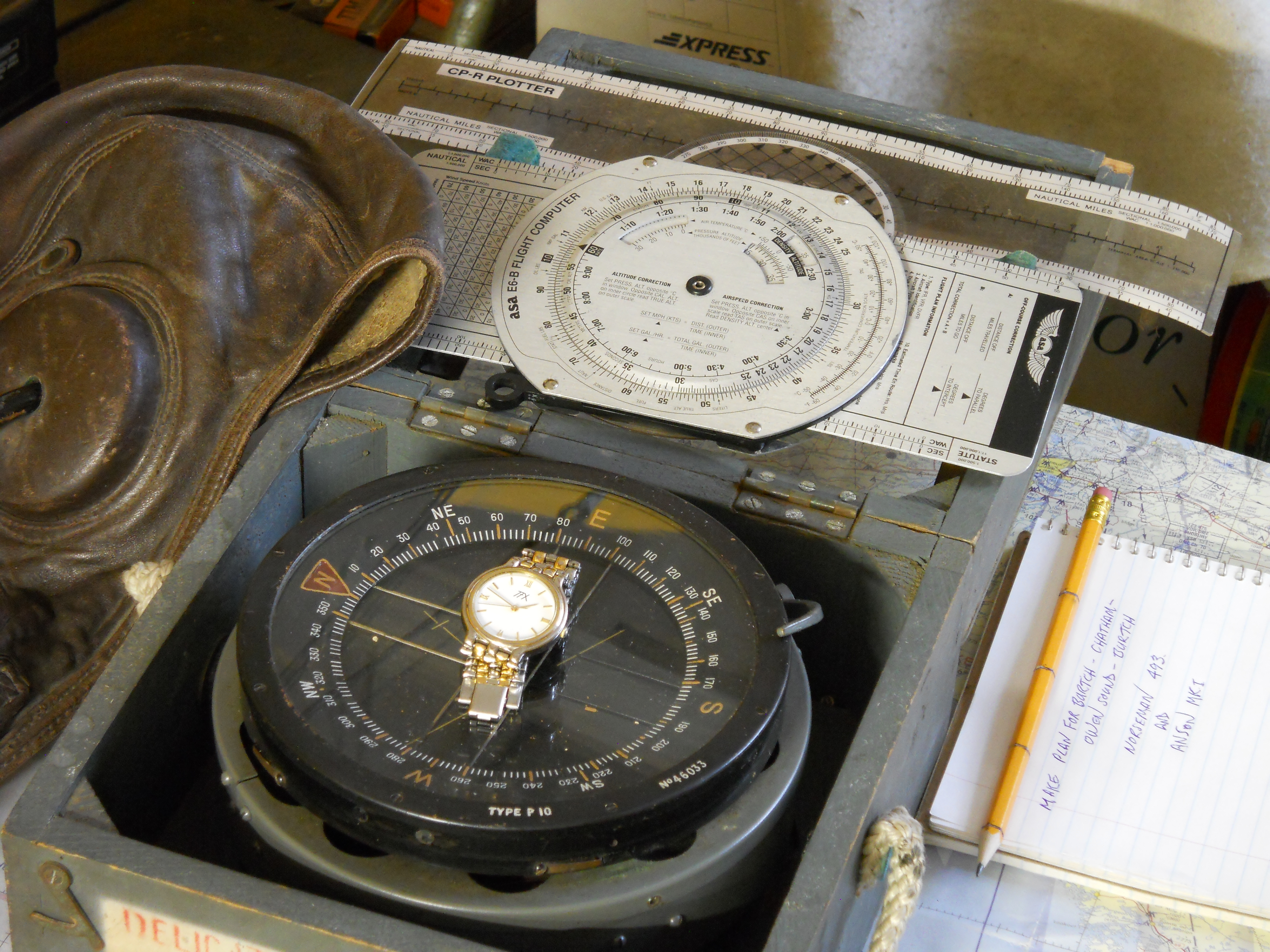
British P10 Magnetic Compass with dead reckoning navigation tools

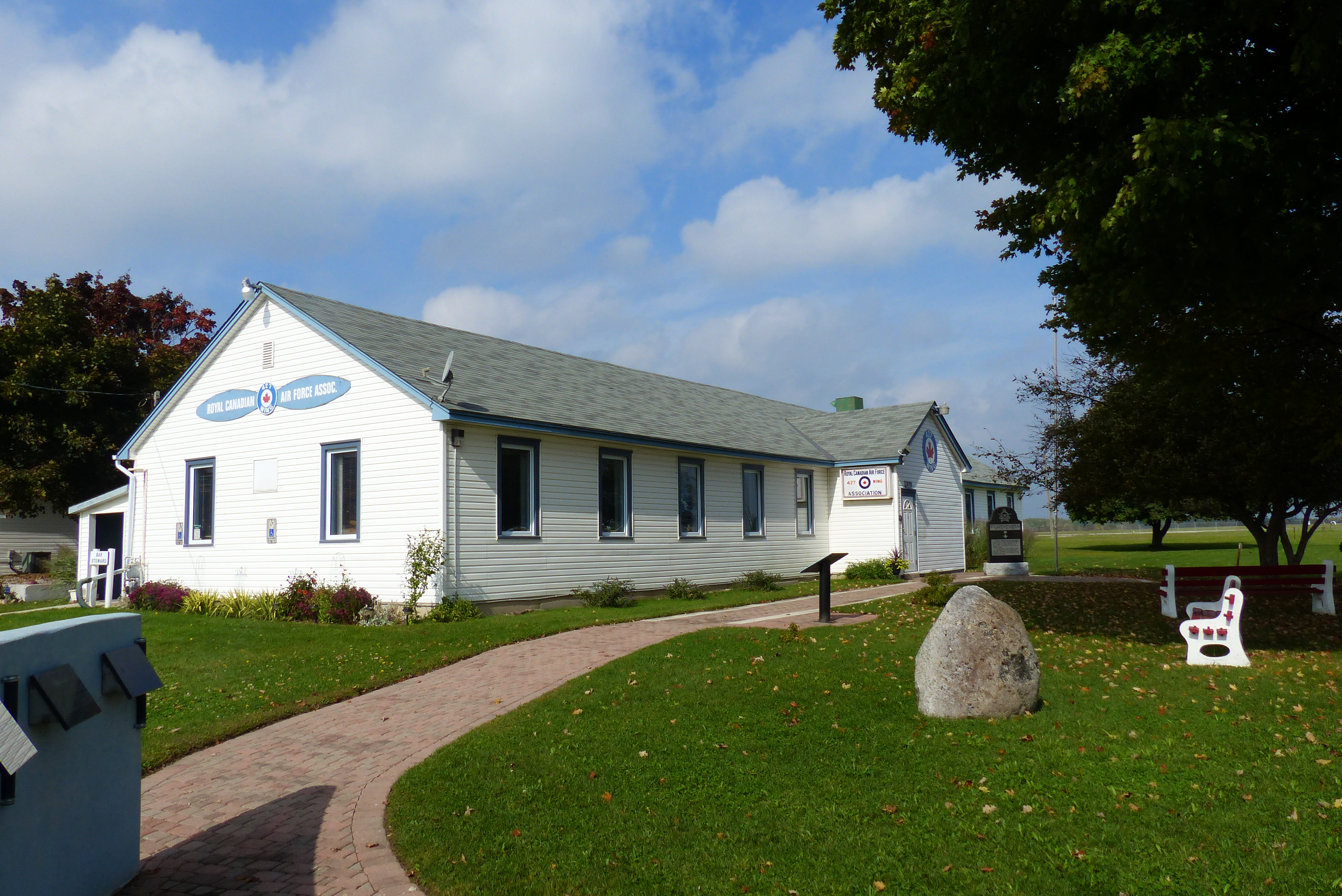
Airmen's Canteen, No. 4 AOS

Air Observers were later called "navigators". For recruits in this stream, the training path after ITS was 8 weeks at an Air Observer School (AOS), 1 month at a Bombing & Gunnery School, and finally 1 month at a Navigation School. The Air Observer schools were operated by civilians under contract to the RCAF. For example, Nos. 7, 8, and 9 were run by CP Airlines. However, the instructors were RCAF. The basic navigation techniques throughout the war years were dead reckoning and visual pilotage, and the tools were the aeronautical chart, magnetic compass, watch, trip log, pencil, Douglas protractor, and Dalton Navigational Computer. They trained in the Avro Anson.

- No. 1 Malton, Ontario
- No. 2 Edmonton, Alberta
- No. 3 Regina, Saskatchewan, moved to Pearce, Alberta
- No. 4 London, Ontario
- No. 5 Winnipeg, Manitoba
- No. 6 Prince Albert, Saskatchewan
- No. 7 Portage la Prairie, Manitoba
- No. 8 L'Ancienne-Lorette, Quebec (No. 8 AOS BCATP)
- No. 9 Saint-Jean-sur-Richelieu, Quebec
- No. 10 Chatham, New Brunswick

=== Bombing and Gunnery Schools ===
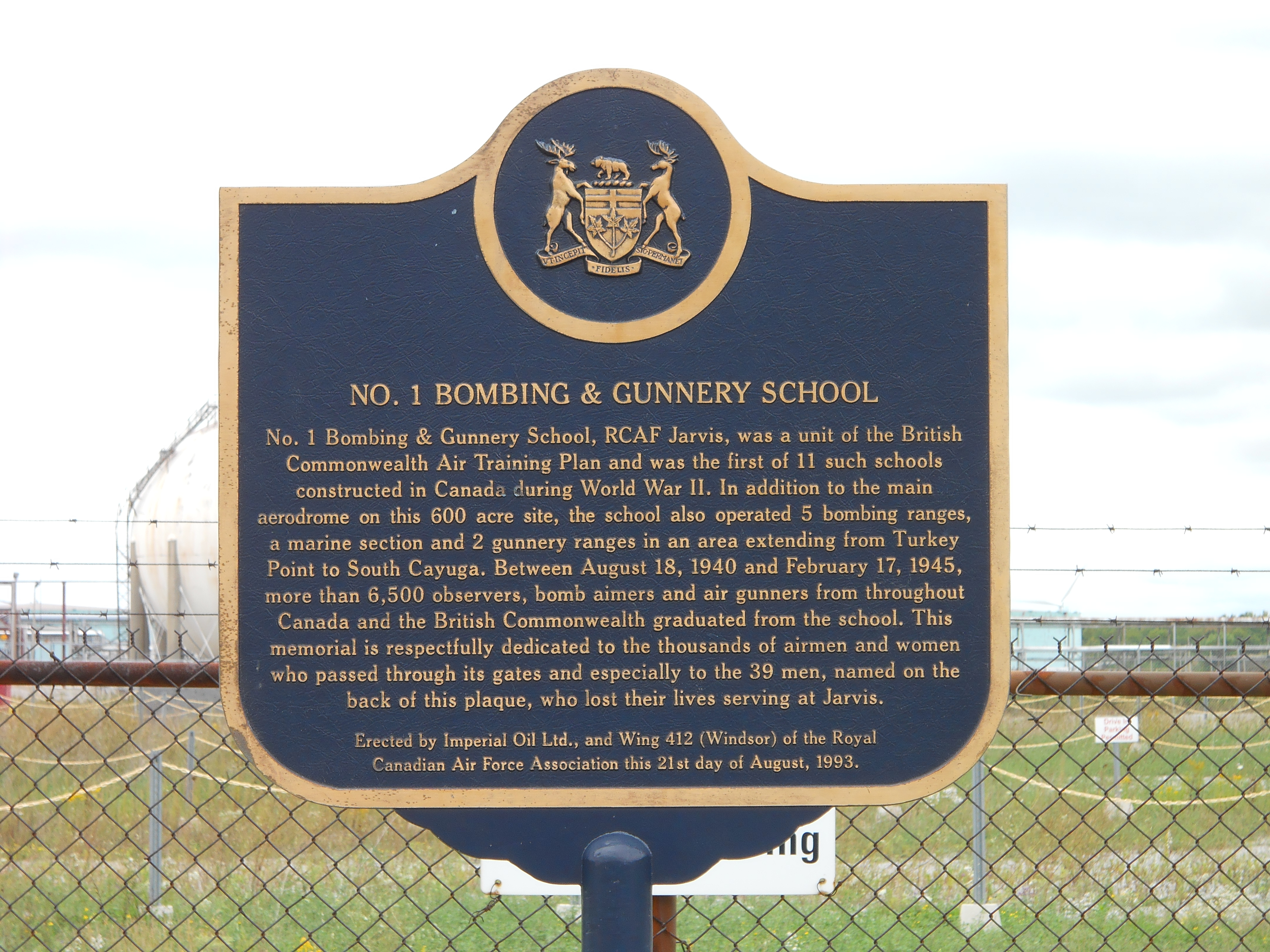
This plaque marks the site of No. 1 B&GS Jarvis

The Bombing and Gunnery School (B&GS) offered instruction in the techniques of bomb aiming and aerial machine gunnery to Air Observers, Bomb Aimers, and Wireless Air Gunners. These schools required large areas to accommodate their bombing and gunnery ranges, and were often located near water. (Note: For example, the aeronautical chart for 1 B&GS Jarvis shows a 140 square mile main range over Lake Erie, and 3 or 4 small "target zones" on land near the shoreline. These ranges start at Grant Point and end at Turkey Point.) The Avro Anson, Fairey Battle, Bristol Bolingbroke, and Westland Lysander were the standard aircraft used at B&GS schools.

- No. 1 Jarvis, Ontario
- No. 2 Mossbank, Saskatchewan 49°55′17″N 105°52′23″W
- No. 3 Macdonald, Manitoba 50°04′49″N 098°27′21″W
- No. 4 Fingal, Ontario 42°40′46″N 081°19′38″W
- No. 5 Dafoe, Saskatchewan 51°55′58″N 104°34′01″W
- No. 6 Mountain View, Ontario
- No. 7 Paulson, Manitoba 51°08′00″N 099°51′45″W
- No. 8 Lethbridge, Alberta
- No. 9 Mont-Joli, Quebec
- No. 10 Mount Pleasant, Prince Edward Island
- No. 31 Picton, Ontario

=== Air Gunners Ground Training Schools ===
The Air Gunners Ground Training Schools (AGGTS) were formed as a result of a critical shortage of aerial gunners overseas. They conducted a six-week preparatory course in the use, care and maintenance of aircraft machine guns, as well as typical parade square bashing (drill), physical training and small-arms live firing (pistol and submachine gun).

- No. 1 Quebec City, Quebec
- No. 2 Trenton, Ontario

=== Air Navigation Schools ===
Nos. 1 & 2 Air Navigation Schools offered four-week courses in astronavigation and were the last step for Air Observers. The RAF schools, Nos. 31, 32, and 33, provided the same training as Air Observer Schools.

- No. 1 Trenton, Ontario moved to Rivers, Manitoba and redesignated Central Navigation School
- No. 2 Pennfield Ridge, New Brunswick (Anson) 45°07′38″N 066°41′40″W
- No. 31 Port Albert, Ontario (Anson) 43°53′05″N 081°41′48″W
- No. 32 Charlottetown, Prince Edward Island
- No. 33 Hamilton, Ontario (Anson)
- No. 2 Charlottetown, Prince Edward Island

=== Wireless Schools ===
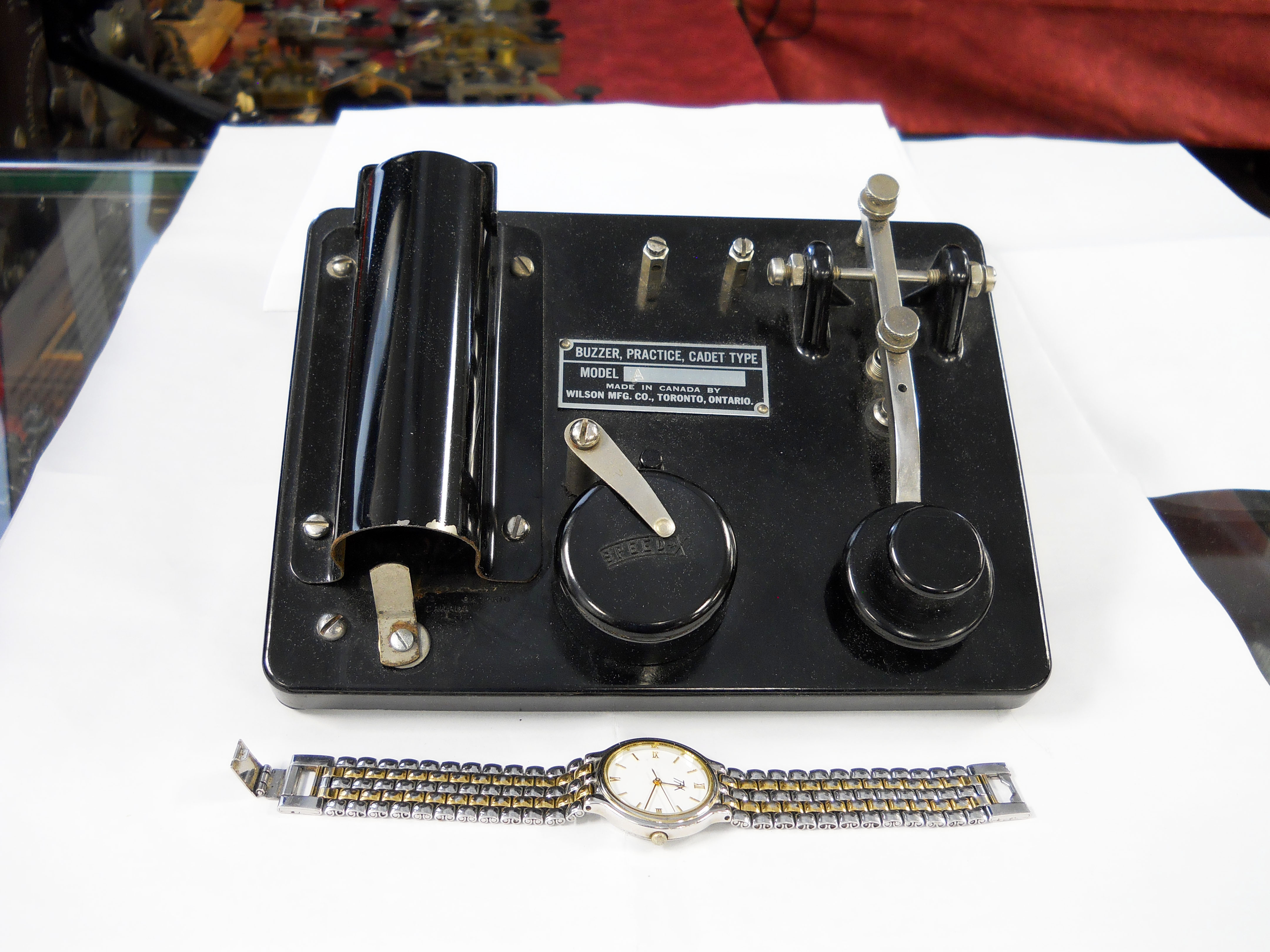
RCAF Morse Code Practice Buzzer

Trainees in the "Wireless Air Gunner" (WAG) stream spent 24 weeks at a Wireless School learning the theory and application of wireless communications. This included signalling with lights and flags as well as radio. Their "WAG" training was completed with four weeks at a Bombing & Gunnery School.

- No. 1 Montreal, Quebec moved to Mount Hope, Ontario (Norseman, Tiger Moth, Stinson 105)
- No. 2 Calgary, Alberta (Harvard and Fort)
- No. 3 Winnipeg, Manitoba (Tiger Moth, Stinson 105, Finch, Norseman)
- No. 4 Guelph, Ontario (Tiger Moth, Yale, Harvard, Norseman)

=== Naval Air Gunner School ===
- No. 1 Yarmouth, Nova Scotia (Swordfish)

=== Flight Engineers' School ===
The flight engineer was the member of a heavy bomber aircrew responsible for monitoring fuel, electrical systems and engines. He also controlled the throttle settings and was the pilot's "assistant". Flight engineers were not co-pilots, but they had some flying training and were expected to be able to take over the controls in the event the pilot was killed or disabled.

- No. 1 Aylmer, Ontario (Halifax, Beaufort, Hampden) 42°48′18″N 080°56′45″W

=== General Reconnaissance Schools ===
The General Reconnaissance School trained pilots and air observers in the techniques required for ocean patrol. It was the equivalent of an Operational Training Unit (OTU), and the last stop before aircrew were assigned to operations. The topics included DR Navigation, Astro Navigation, Compasses and Instruments, Meteorology, Signals, Reconnaissance, Coding, Ship Recognition, Aerial Photography, and Visual Signals.

Aircrew spent nine weeks at a General Reconnaissance School.

- No. 1 General Reconnaissance School RCAF (Summerside, Prince Edward Island) (Anson)
- No. 31 Charlottetown, Prince Edward Island (Anson)

=== Operational Training Units ===
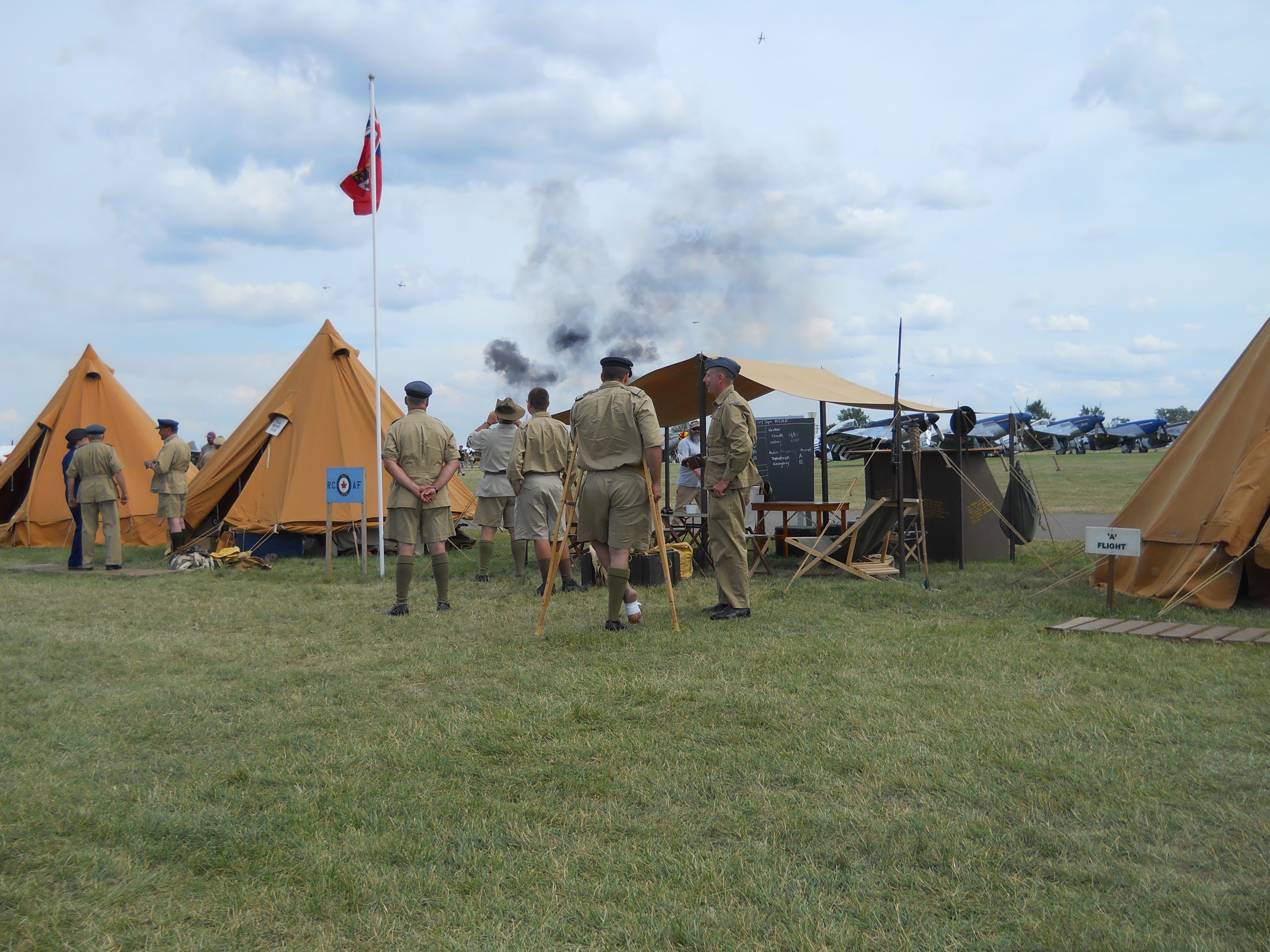
Reenactment of RCAF Gunnery Practice at an English OTU

The Operational Training Unit (OTU) was the last stop for aircrew trainees. They spent 8 to 14 weeks learning to fly operational aircraft (Hawker Hurricane or Fairey Swordfish, e.g.). The instructors had experience in actual operations, and often were posted to OTUs after their operational tour.

- No. 1 Bagotville, Quebec (Hurricane)
- No. 3 Patricia Bay, British Columbia (Canso, Catalina)
- No. 5 Boundary Bay, British Columbia, secondary airfield at Abbotsford, British Columbia (Consolidated B-24 Liberator, North American Mitchell)
- No. 31 Debert, Nova Scotia redesignated No. 7 OTU (Lockheed Hudson, de Havilland Mosquito, Anson)
- No. 32 Patricia Bay, British Columbia moved to Comox, British Columbia and redesignated No. 6 OTU (Bristol Beaufort, Handley Page Hampden, Swordfish, Anson).
- No. 34 Pennfield Ridge, New Brunswick (Ventura) 45°07′38″N 066°41′40″W
- No. 36 Greenwood, Nova Scotia redesignated No. 8 OTU (Hudson, Mosquito)

=== Central Flying School ===
The Central Flying School was located at Trenton, Ontario.

=== Central Navigation School ===
The Central Navigation School was located at Rivers, Manitoba (Anson). 50°00′37″N 100°19′06″W

=== Instrument Navigation School ===
The Instrument Navigation School was located near Deseronto, Ontario.

=== Flying Instructor Schools ===
- No. 1 Trenton, Ontario
- No. 2 Vulcan, Alberta, moved to Pearce, Alberta
- No. 3 Arnprior, Ontario

=== Aircrew Graduates Training Schools ===
The Aircrew Graduates Training School (AGTS) was established in January 1944 and was usually the last stop for aircrew before they transferred to operational units overseas. The instructors were normally drawn from the ranks of the Army. Aircrew graduates spent 3 weeks learning survival and evasion techniques that would prove useful if shot down behind enemy lines. The training included self-defence, living off the land, evasion techniques and ground navigation.

- No. 1 Maitland, Nova Scotia
- No. 2 Quebec City, later transferred to Calgary, Alberta
- No. 3 Three Rivers, Quebec
- No. 4 Valleyfield, Quebec

=== Relief landing fields ===
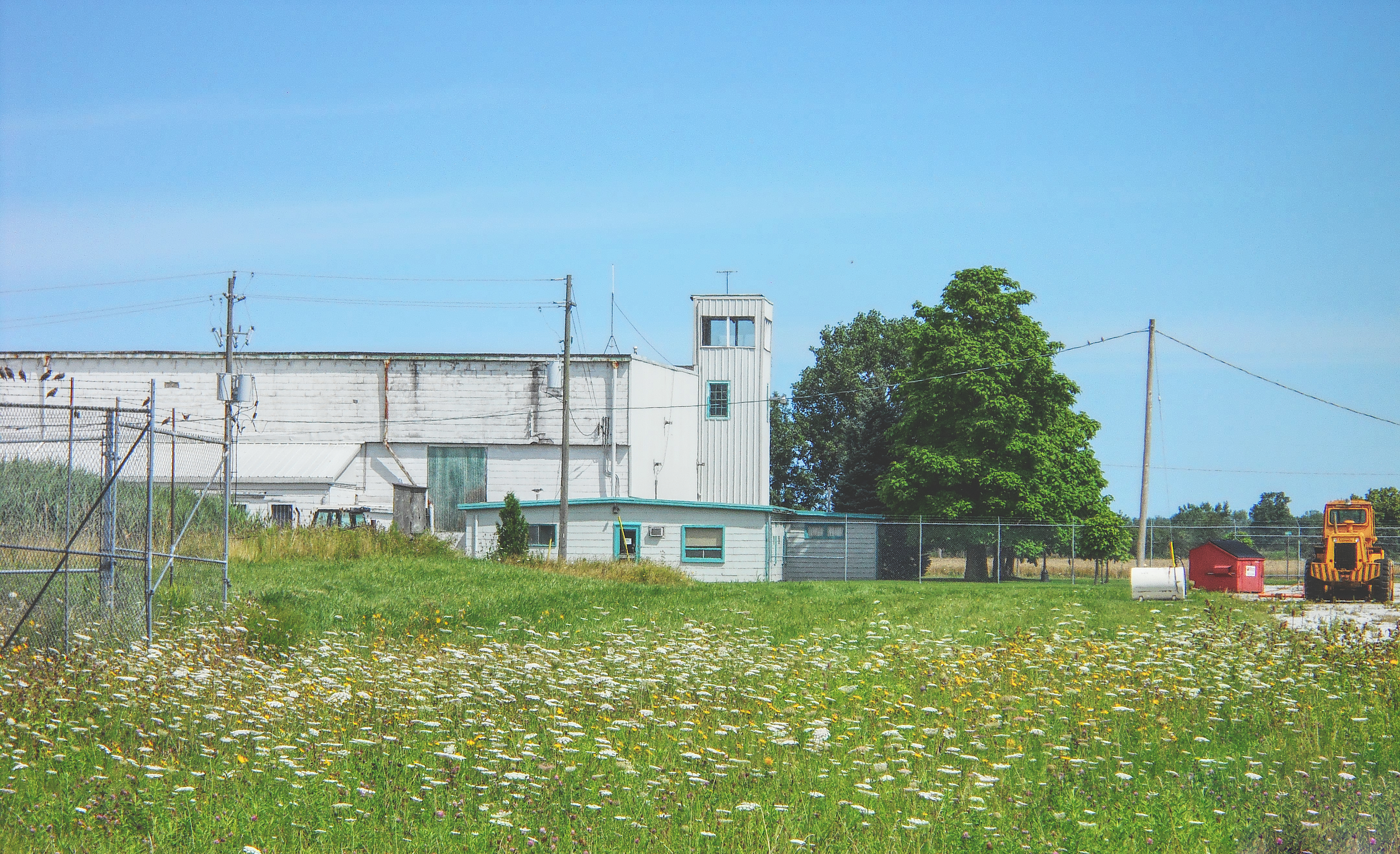
RCAF Grand Bend. The 1942 Hangar as seen from the Taxiway, Control Tower on top. R1 for No. 9 SFTS Centralia. (2013)

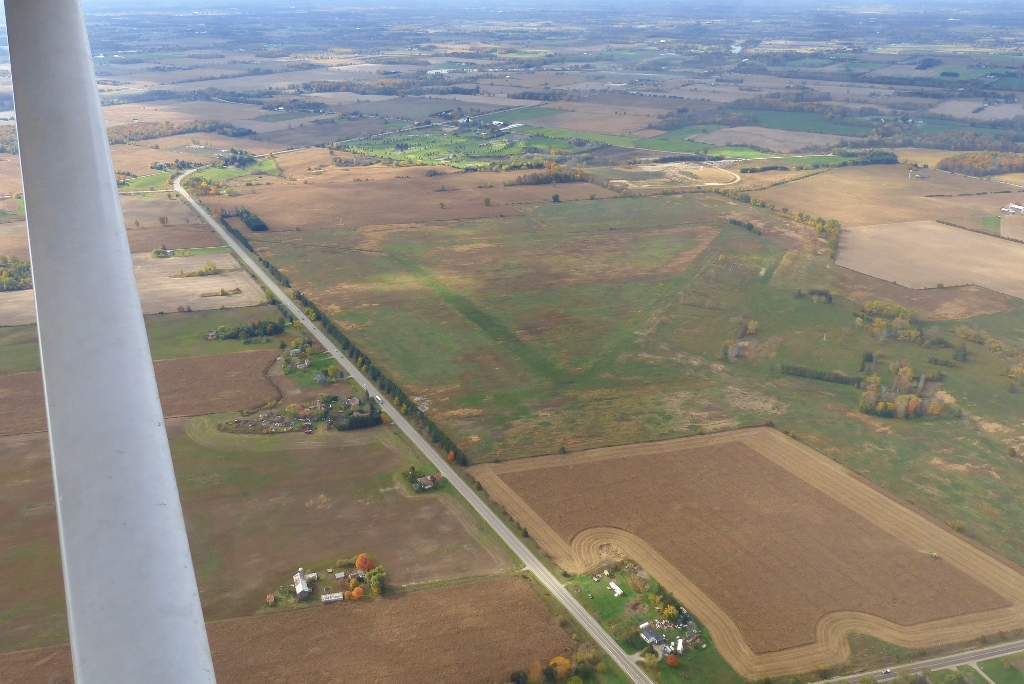
Site of RCAF Burtch, built for No. 4 Wireless School in 1941. (2016)

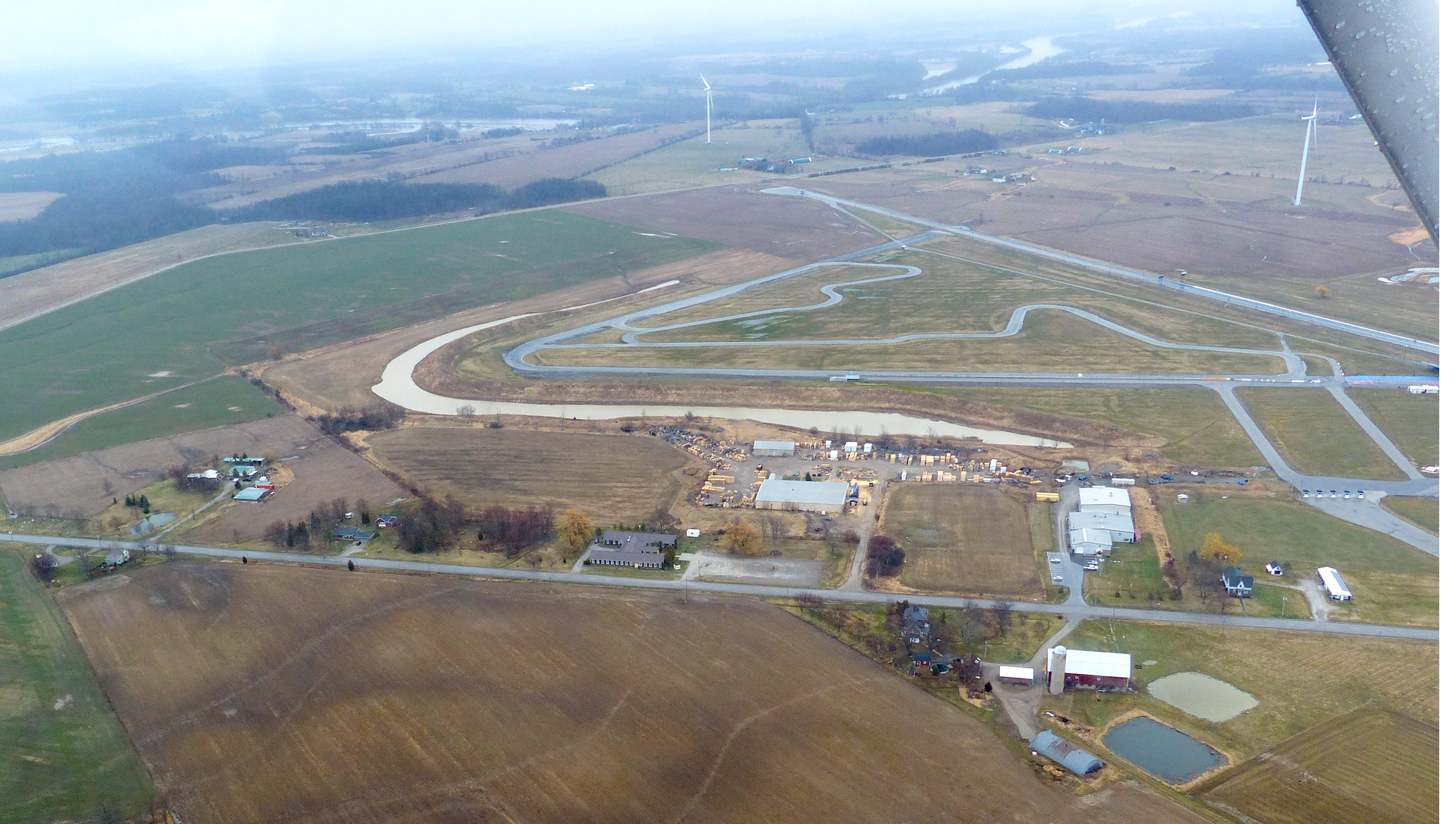
Site of RCAF Cayuga, relief landing field built in 1941–1942. (2018)

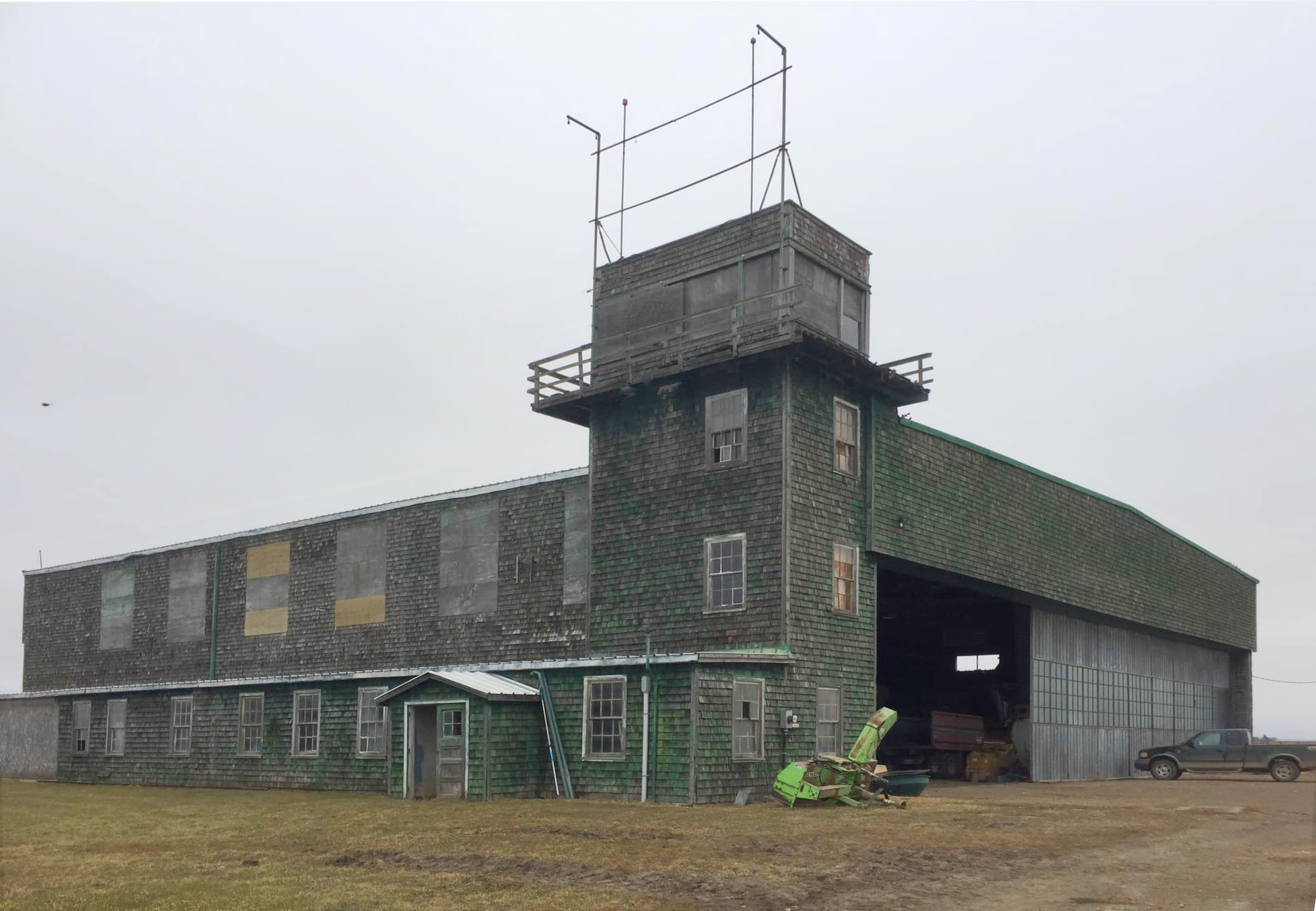
A well preserved relief field hangar. Site of RCAF Chater. (2019)

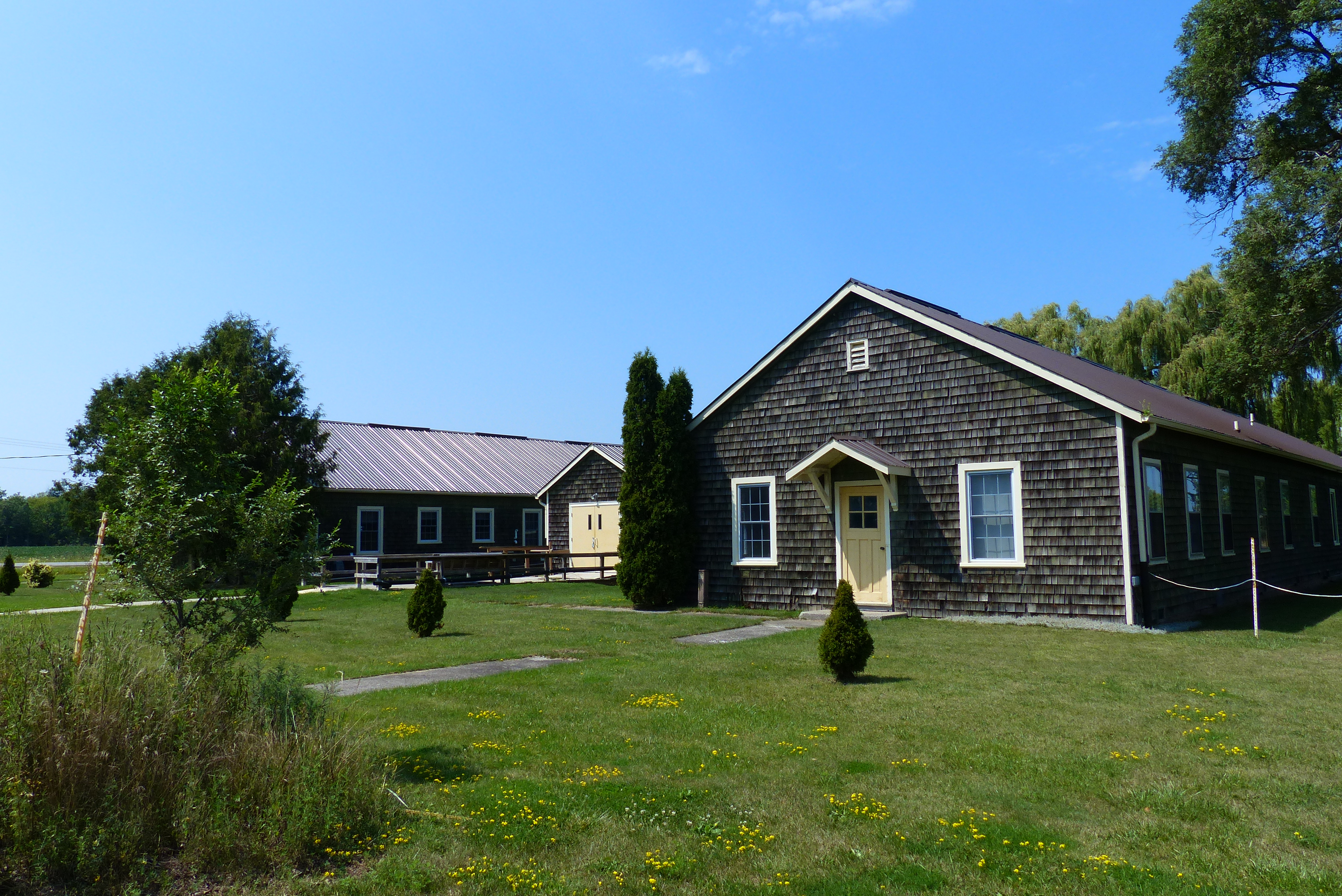
H-Hut at RCAF Cayuga, abandoned relief airfield. R1 for No. 16 SFTS Hagersville. (2014)

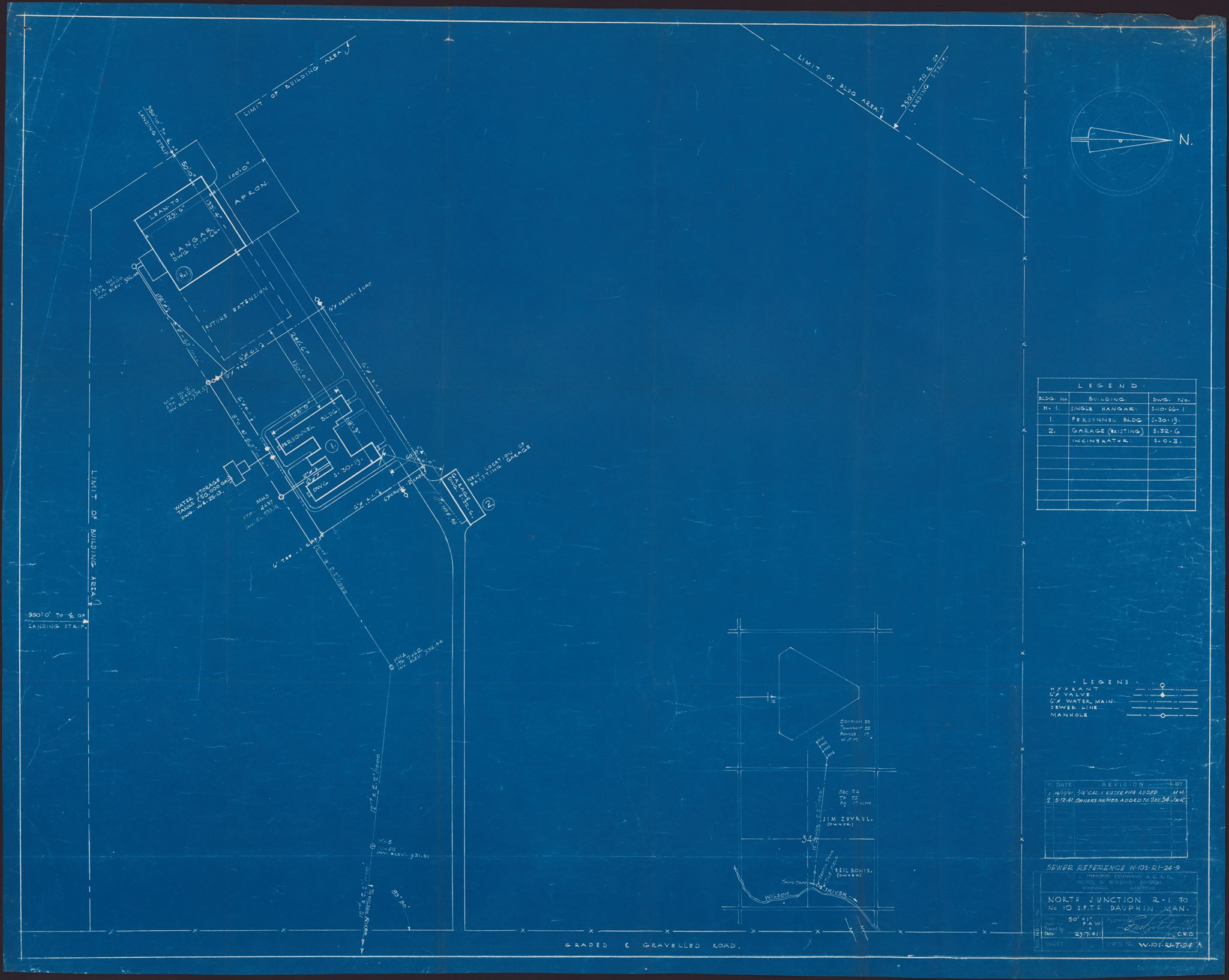
Building Plan for RCAF North Junction, R1 for No. 10 SFTS Dauphin. (1941)

Map of Elementary Flying Training Schools

Every principal airfield (e.g. EFTS or SFTS) had one or two relief airfields located within 10–15 km. The No. 1 Relief Airfield is called "R1" in RCAF Station diaries. Some of the relief fields were paved, some were just grass, and some had hangars, barracks, and maintenance facilities. For example, trainees at No. 14 SFTS Aylmer moved to their R1 at Yarmouth Centre for the last four weeks of their course (radio, bombing, and gunnery).

- Airdrie, Alberta – R1 for No. 3 SFTS Calgary
- Alliston, Ontario – R2 for No. 1 SFTS Camp Borden 44°07′00″N 079°49′30″W
- Blackfalds, Alberta – R2 for No. 36 SFTS Penhold 52°23′N 113°52′W
- Boharm, Saskatchewan – R1 for No. 33 EFTS Caron 50°19′19″N 105°42′14″W
- Brada, Saskatchewan – R1 for No. 35 and No. 13 SFTS North Battleford
- Brora, Saskatchewan – R1 for No. 15 EFTS Regina
- Burtch, Ontario – R1 for No. 5 SFTS Brantford and principal field for No. 4 Wireless School Guelph. 43°03′08″N 080°16′29″W
- Buttress, Saskatchewan – R1 for No. 32 SFTS Moose Jaw 50°14′10″N 105°32′50″W
- Carp, Ontario – R1 for No. 2 SFTS Ottawa 45°19′21″N 76°1′3″W
- Cayuga, Ontario – R1 for No. 16 SFTS Hagersville42°54′10″N 079°51′23″W
- Champion, Alberta – R2 for No. 19 SFTS Vulcan50°12′30″N 113°10′36″W
- Chandler, Saskatchewan – Relief for No. 38 SFTS Estevan49°18′46″N 103°24′29″W
- Chater, Manitoba – R1 for No. 12 SFTS Brandon 49°54′25″N 099°47′53″W
- Douglas, Manitoba – R2 for No. 12 SFTS Brandon49°55′35″N 099°39′33″W
- Chicoutimi, Quebec – R1 for No. 1 OTU Bagotville
- Dufferin, Ontario – Relief for No. 16 SFTS Hagersville 42°57′54″N 080°01′24″W
- Eden, Manitoba – R1 for No. 35 EFTS Neepawa 50°22′30″N 099°25′58″W
- Edenvale, Ontario – R1 for No. 1 SFTS Camp Borden
- Edwards, Ontario – Relief for No. 2 SFTS Ottawa 45°18′12″N 075°28′00″W
- Elgin, Manitoba – R2 for No. 17 SFTS Souris49°29′16.8″N 100°14′13.2″W
- Ensign, Alberta – R1 for No. 19 SFTS Vulcan50°28′42″N 113°20′02″W
- Farnham, Quebec – R2 for No. 13 SFTS St. Hubert 45°18′03″N 072°56′36″W
- Frank Lake, Alberta – Relief for No. 5 EFTS High River50°31′39″N 113°45′55″W
- Gananoque – R1 for No. 31 SFTS Kingston 44°27′07″N 076°14′39″W
- Grand Bend, Ontario – R1 for No. 9 SFTS Centralia
- Goderich South – Relief for No. 12 EFTS Goderich 43°42′16.7″N 081°40′27.46″W
- Gladys, Alberta – R2 for No. 31 EFTS DeWinton50°42′33″N 113°41′55″W
- Granum, Alberta – R1 for No. 7 SFTS Fort MacLeod 49°48′40″N 113°26′43″W
- Halbrite, Saskatchewan – R1 for No. 41 SFTS Weyburn49°27′00″N 103°32′20″W
- Hamlin, Saskatchewan – R1 for No. 35 SFTS North Battleford52°52′48″N 108°17′19″W
- Hartney, Manitoba – R1 for No. 17 SFTS Souris 49°27′08″N 100°31′02″W
- Hawkesbury, Ontario – Relief for No. 13 EFTS St. Eugene 45°36′33″N 074°35′42″W
- Holsom, Alberta – Relief for No. 34 SFTS Medicine Hat50°01′40″N 110°51′30″W
- Innisfail, Alberta – R1 for No. 36 SFTS Penhold 52°04′43″N 114°01′39″W
- Inverlake, Alberta – R2 for No. 3 SFTS Calgary51°02′28″N 113°37′50″W
- Langley, British Columbia – Relief for No. 18 EFTS Boundary Bay
- Limoges, Ontario – Relief for No. 10 EFTS Pendleton 45°23′50″N 075°15′48″W
- Maitland, Nova Scotia – Relief for No. 31 OTU Debert 45°19′41″N 063°31′42″W
- Maurice, Quebec – Relief for No. 11 EFTS Cap-de-la-Madeleine 46°28′24″N 072°34′30″W
- Mount Pleasant, Prince Edward Island – R1 for No. 9 SFTS Summerside 46°36′00″N 064°00′00″W
- Netley, Manitoba – R1 for No. 18 SFTS Gimli 50°22′04″N 096°59′27″W
- Netook, Alberta – R1 for No. 32 EFTS Bowden 51°51′08″N 114°03′52″W
- North Junction, Manitoba – Relief for No. 10 SFTS Dauphin 51°12′41″N 100°04′55″W
- Oberon, Manitoba – R2 for No. 33 SFTS Carberry50°03′N 099°28′W
- Osler, Saskatchewan – R2 for No. 4 SFTS Saskatoon 52°22′N 106°31′W
- Outram, Saskatchewan – Relief for No. 38 SFTS Estevan49°07′47″N 103°15′54″W
- Petrel, Manitoba – R1 for No. 33 SFTS Carberry 49°58′00″N 099°21′00″W
- Pontiac, Quebec – Relief for No. 3 FIS Arnprior 45°29′07″N 076°15′53″W
- Pulteney, Alberta – R2 for No. 15 SFTS Claresholm
- Ralph, Saskatchewan – R2 for No. 41 SFTS Weyburn49°32′50″N 103°41′20″W
- Rhein, Saskatchewan – R2 for No. 11 SFTS Yorkton 51°18′00″N 102°09′30″W
- St. Aldwyn, Saskatchewan – R1 for No. 39 SFTS Swift Current 50°23′25″N 107°45′30″W
- St. Honoré, Quebec – Relief for No. 1 OTU Bagotville 48°31′15″N 071°03′02″W
- St. Joseph, Ontario – Relief for No. 9 SFTS Centralia 43°25′25.7″N 081°41′18.6″W
- St. Thomas, Ontario – R1 for No. 14 SFTS Aylmer and No. 4 B&GS Fingal
- Salisbury, New Brunswick – R2 for No. 8 SFTS Moncton 46°02′54″N 065°04′00″W
- Sandhurst, Ontario – R2 for No. 31 SFTS Kingston 44°09′18″N 076°52′00″W
- Scoudouc, New Brunswick – R1 for No. 8 SFTS Moncton46°10′14″N 064°35′20″W
- Shepard, Alberta – R1 for No. 31 EFTS DeWinton50°56′31″N 113°58′03″W
- Sturdee, Saskatchewan – R1 for No. 11 SFTS Yorkton 51°11′19″N 102°22′05″W
- Tillsonburg, Ontario – R2 for No. 14 SFTS Aylmer
- Valley River, Manitoba – Relief for No. 10 SFTS Dauphin51°13′41″N 100°13′00″W
- Vanscoy, Saskatchewan – R1 for No. 4 SFTS Saskatoon 52°01′00″N 107°02′00″W
- Waterville, Nova Scotia – Relief for No. 8 OTU Greenwood 45°03′07″N 064°39′06″W
- Welland, Ontario – R1 for No. 6 SFTS Dunnville
- Wellington, Prince Edward Island – Relief for No. 1 GRS Summerside 46°28′30″N 064°01′00″W
- Whitby, Ontario – Relief for No. 20 EFTS Oshawa 43°51′25″N 078°54′37″W
- Whitla, Alberta – Relief for No. 34 SFTS Medicine Hat49°59′15″N 111°01′40″W
- Willoughby, Ontario – Relief for No. 9 EFTS St. Catharines 43°00′00″N 079°04′30″W
- Woodhouse, Alberta – R1 for No. 15 SFTS 49°59′35″N 113°26′41″W

== Groundcrew training facilities ==
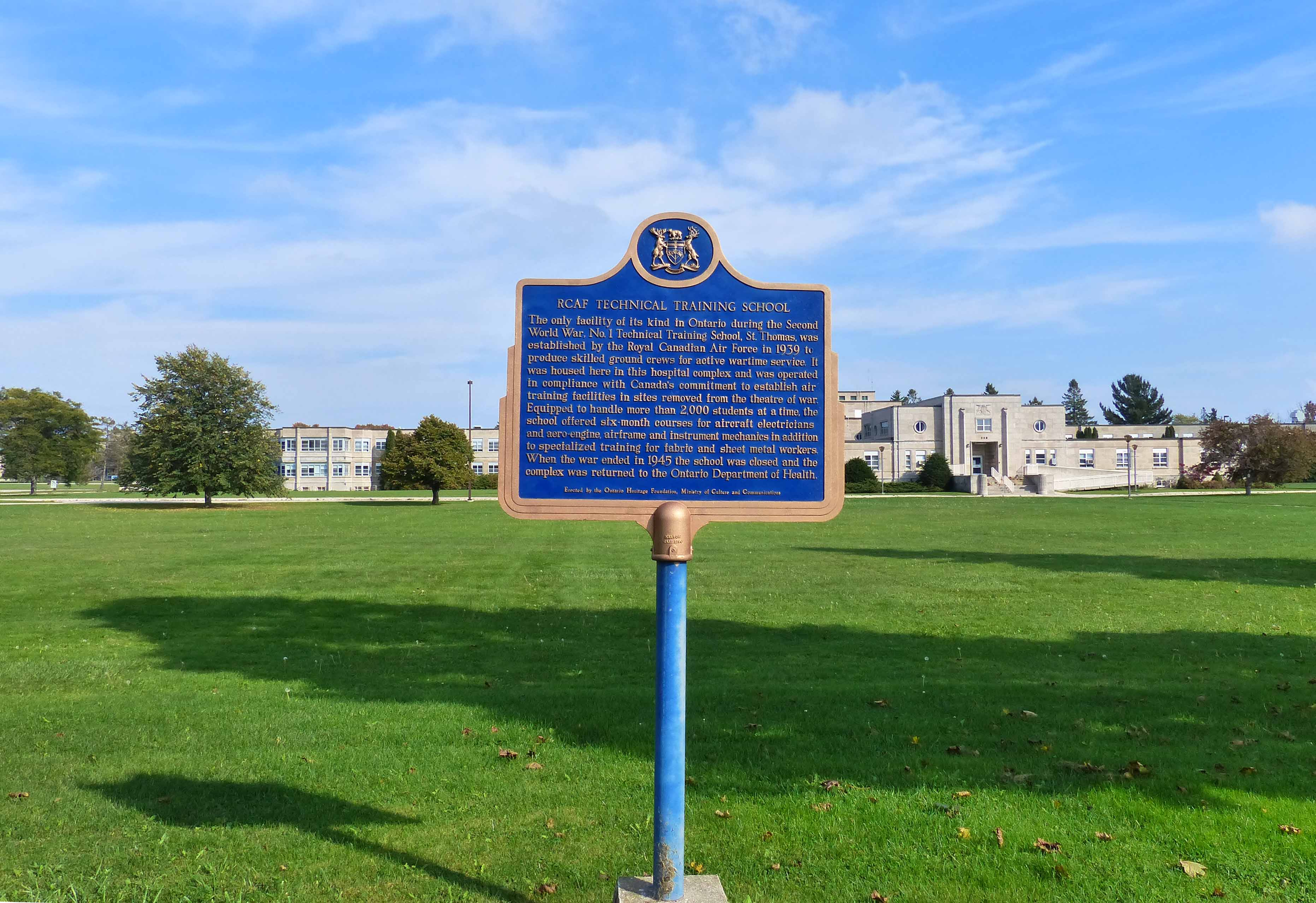
Site of No. 1 TTS St. Thomas, Ontario

- Air Armament School Mountain View, Ontario
- No. 1 Radio Direction Finding (Radar) School Leaside, Ontario
- No. 31 Radio Direction Finding (Radar) School Clinton, Ontario, later RCAF No. 5
- School of Cookery Guelph, Ontario
- No. 1 Code and Cypher School Guelph, Ontario
- No. 1 Technical Training School St. Thomas, Ontario

== Support facilities ==
- No. 1 Test Kitchen Guelph, Ontario
- No. 1 Nutritional Laboratory Guelph, Ontario
- No. 6 Repair Depot Trenton, Ontario
- No. 8 Repair Depot Winnipeg, Manitoba

== See also ==
- List of British Commonwealth Air Training Plan facilities in Australia
