= Neepawa Airport =

Airport in Manitoba, Canada

- IATA: none; ICAO: none; TC LID: CJV5

Summary
- Airport type: Public
- Operator: Town of Neepawa
- Location: Municipality of North Cypress-Langford, near Neepawa, Manitoba
- Time zone: CST (UTC−06:00)
  - Summer (DST): CDT (UTC−05:00)
- Elevation AMSL: 1,277 ft / 389 m
- Coordinates: 50°13′57″N 099°30′36″W

Map
- Location in Manitoba CJV5 (Canada)

Runways
| Direction | Length | | Surface |
| Direction | ft | m | Surface |
|---|---|---|---|
| 04/22 | 3,507 | 1,069 | Asphalt |
- Source: Canada Flight Supplement

Neepawa Airport (TC LID: CJV5) is located 1.7 nautical miles (3.1 km; 2.0 mi) west of Neepawa, Manitoba, Canada, immediately north of the Yellowhead Highway.

The airport is operated by the town of Neepawa. It is used by owners of light and ultralight aircraft, chiefly for pleasure flying and crop dusting. The airport has also been employed for hanglider training. The property supports several light industrial enterprises.

== History ==
The present-day airport building was originally the RCAF Station Neepawa, constructed during the Second World War under the British Commonwealth Air Training Plan (BCATP). It was one of many dozens of Canadian airports once used to train pilots and other air crew for the Royal Air Force and other British Commonwealth air forces.

Tens of thousands of eager BCATP trainees from across the globe spent time in and around small towns throughout Canada, often experiencing severe winter weather for the first time. Their lives in Manitoba, on and off base, are dramatized in the 1993 film For the Moment, starring New Zealand actor Russell Crowe.

After the war until the 1960s, the original control tower was operated in support of civil aviation by the Canadian Department of Transport. Other airport facilities, including a hangar and a rifle range, continued for some years to serve Squadron 9 of the Royal Canadian Air Cadets and the local militia organization. Many of the original wooden buildings have since been demolished.

== See also ==
- List of airports in Manitoba
