= 406 Maritime Operational Training Squadron =

No. 406 Squadron RCAF
- Active: 1941–1945; 1947–1964; 1972–present
- Country: Canada
- Branch: (Canada) Royal Canadian Air Force
- Role: Night interception (1941–1944); Ground attack (1944–1945); Tactical bombing/army co-operation (1947–1958); Light transport/Search & Rescue (1958–1964); Helicopter training (1972–present)
- Part of: 12 Wing
- Home base: CFB Shearwater
- Nickname: Lynx Squadron
- Motto: We Kill By Night
- Battle honours: Defence of Britain 1941–1945; English Channel & North Sea; Fortress Europe 1943–1944; France and Germany 1944–1945; Rhine Biscay Ports 1944; Normandy 1944; Biscay 1944

Insignia
- Squadron Code: HU (1941–1945)
- Squadron Badge: Lynx saliente affronte

Aircraft flown
- Bomber: B-25 Mitchell (1947–58)
- Fighter: Blenheim (1941); Beaufighter (1941–1944); Mosquito (1944–1945)
- Helicopter: CH-124 Sea King (1972–2016); Sikorsky CH-148 Cyclone (2016–present)
- Patrol: CP-121 Tracker (1972–1981)
- Reconnaissance: Harvard; T-33 Silver Star (1947–1958)
- Transport: C-45 Expeditor; CSR-123 Otter (1958–1964)

406 "City of Saskatoon" Maritime Operational Training Squadron is a Royal Canadian Air Force (RCAF) unit of the Canadian Armed Forces. Based at 12 Wing Shearwater since 1972, it is responsible for crew training on the Sikorsky CH-148 Cyclone since summer of 2016. The squadron was formed during World War II as part of RAF Fighter Command.

== History ==
The squadron was formed as No. 406 Squadron RCAF at RAF Acklington on 5 May 1941, as part of No. 12 Group of Fighter Command to operate as night fighters. The squadron was equipped with Blenheim Mk.IF heavy fighters, re-equipping with the improved Beaufighter Mk.IIF the next month. They operated out of several airfields in the United Kingdom, changing to the Beaufighter Mk.VIF in mid-1942, and receiving the Mosquito Mk.XII night-fighter during April 1944. They upgraded to the Mosquito Mk.XXX in July 1944, and operated this aircraft for the remainder of the war. In November 1944 it was renamed No. 406 (Intruder) Squadron to carry out daylight offensive operations over mainland Europe. In June 1945 the squadron was posted to RAF Predannack in Cornwall, where it disbanded in August 1945.

The unit was reformed as a reserve unit, 406 Tactical Bomber Squadron (Auxiliary) on 1 April 1947 at RCAF Station Saskatoon. It flew B-25 Mitchell light bombers, and also Harvard and T-33 Silver Star aircraft for army co-operation duties. It was redesignated 406 (Light Bomber) Squadron on 1 April 1949, and adopted the title City of Saskatoon in September 1952.

In March 1958 under the name 406 Squadron, it was re-equipped with C-45 Expeditor and CSR-123 Otter aircraft, and assigned to a light transport and emergency rescue role. The squadron was disbanded again on 1 April 1964.

The squadron was reformed for a third time at CFB Shearwater on 12 July 1972 as the 406 Maritime Operational Training Squadron, operating the CH-124 Sea King helicopter and the CP-121 Tracker ASW aircraft. In mid-1981, the operational Tracker squadron, 880 Maritime Reconnaissance Squadron, was transferred CFB Summerside, which left 406 Squadron solely responsible for Sea King training. It currently provides trained air and ground crews for 423 and 443 Maritime Helicopter squadrons. Around 200 to 300 students graduate from 406 Squadron courses each year.
