= Brandon Municipal Airport =

Airport in Manitoba, Canada

Brandon Municipal Airport _{Aéroport municipal de Brandon}

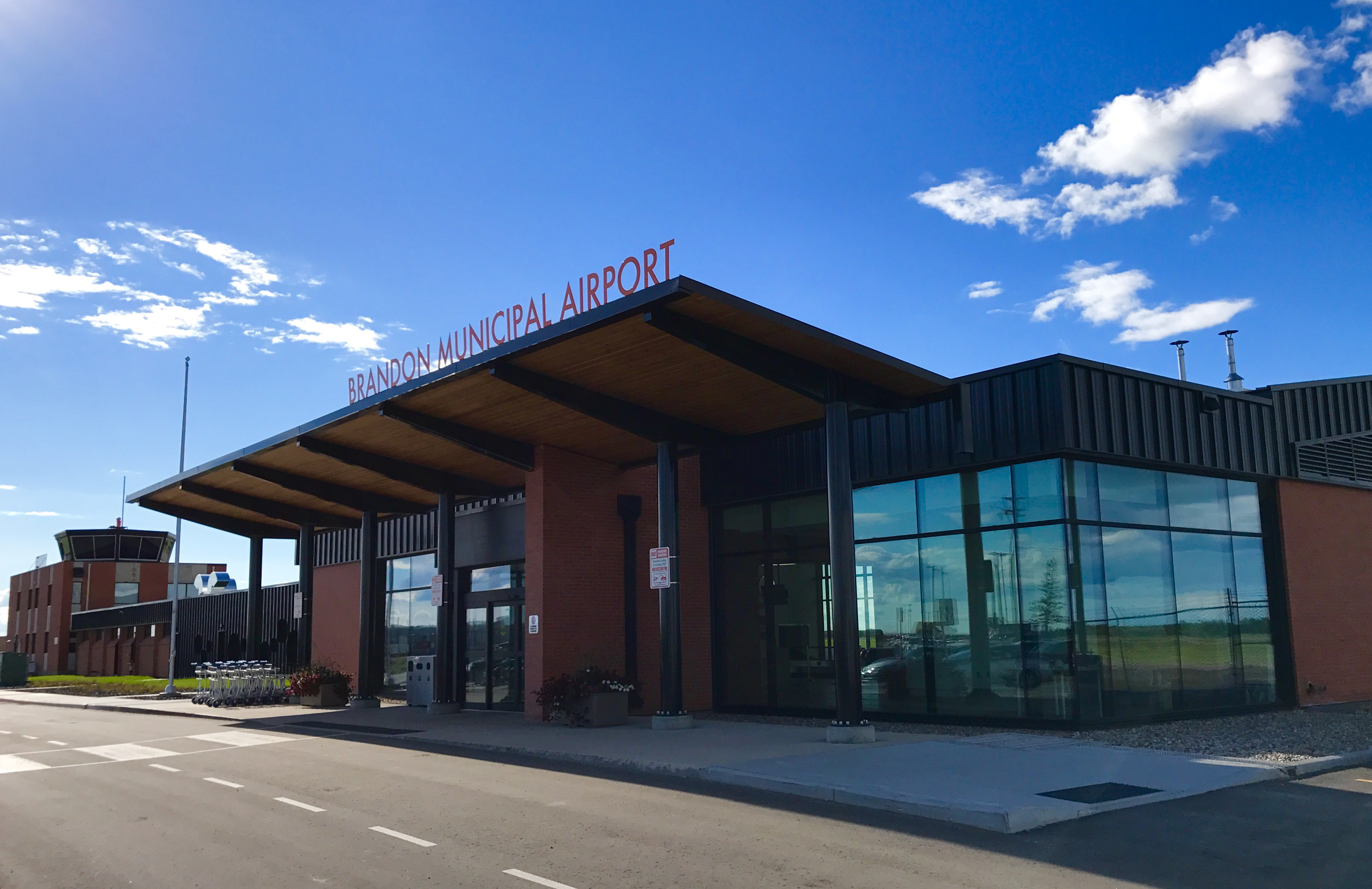
- IATA: YBR; ICAO: CYBR; WMO: 71140

Summary
- Airport type: Public
- Owner/Operator: City of Brandon
- Serves: Brandon, Westman Region, Parkland Region, eastern Saskatchewan
- Location: Brandon, Manitoba
- Time zone: CST (UTC−06:00)
  - Summer (DST): CDT (UTC−05:00)
- Elevation AMSL: 1,343 ft / 409 m
- Coordinates: 49°54′36″N 099°57′08″W
- Website: airport.brandon.ca

Map
- Interactive map of Brandon Municipal Airport

Runways
Direction	Length		Surface
Direction	ft	m	Surface
08/26	6,515	1,986	Asphalt
14/32	2,901	884	Treated gravel / asphalt

Statistics (2010)
- Aircraft movements: 21,591
- Sources: Canada Flight Supplement and Transport Canada; Environment Canada; Movements from Statistics Canada

Brandon Municipal Airport (also known as Brandon Airport or McGill Field) (IATA: YBR, ICAO: CYBR) is an airport located 1.6 km (0.99 mi) north of Brandon, Manitoba, Canada. It serves the City of Brandon, the Westman and Parkland regions of Manitoba, and eastern Saskatchewan. Brandon Municipal Airport is classified as an airport of entry by Nav Canada and is staffed by the Canada Border Services Agency (CBSA) on a call-out basis from the International Peace Garden Border Crossing.

WestJet Encore operates daily non-stop service from Brandon to Calgary International Airport. Brandon Municipal Airport is home to the Commonwealth Air Training Plan Museum.

== History ==
=== World War II ===
Brandon Aerodrome was originally built by the Department of National Defence in 1941, for use as a Royal Canadian Air Force flight training school under the British Commonwealth Air Training Plan. Pilots were trained at the airport on Cessna Cranes and Avro Ansons, among other aircraft, for Second World War flying service. In 1945, the school was closed in conjunction with the end of the Second World War.

Portions of the former RCAF Station Brandon are now classified as a National Historic Site of Canada. The Commonwealth Air Training Plan Museum is a popular tourist attraction located at the airport that commemorates the BCATP and the former Station.

=== Commercial service ===
Brandon Municipal Airport has had scheduled passenger air service operated by a number of airlines since the late 1970s. Perimeter Aviation served Brandon Airport in the early 1980s with weekday flights to Winnipeg James Armstrong Richardson International Airport operated with Beechcraft commuter aircraft. Pacific Western Airlines introduced Boeing 737-200 service to Brandon Airport in the mid-1980s, operated on a round trip routing of Vancouver–Kelowna–Calgary–Brandon–Thunder Bay–Toronto six days a week.

During the 1990s, Bearskin Airlines flew Beechcraft Model 99 commuter turboprop aircraft between Brandon Municipal Airport and Winnipeg International Airport with four daily flights, and Perimeter Aviation flew Swearingen Metro commuter propjets with two daily flights between Brandon and Winnipeg. Athabaska Airlines also operated weekday flights to Winnipeg using Beechcraft 1900C commuter prop-jets.

=== 2000s ===
On September 3, 2013, WestJet Encore launched daily non-stop service from Brandon to Calgary International Airport operated with Bombardier Q400 aircraft. From June 29, 2016 to September 5, 2016, WestJet operated limited-time non-stop service from Brandon to Toronto Pearson International Airport utilizing Boeing 737 aircraft, stating that the service may return dependent on demand and fleet availability.

A major redevelopment and expansion of the passenger terminal building was announced by local and provincial government officials on August 14, 2014 to meet increased passenger demand. Construction began in 2015, and the new Brandon Municipal Airport terminal building officially opened on May 10, 2017.

== Infrastructure ==
=== Runways ===
Brandon Municipal Airport occupies a total land area of 2.98 square kilometres (736 acres) and has two active runways, 08/26 and 14/32.
Runway 14/32 is used for light aircraft only.

Number	Length	Width	ILS	Surface
08/26	6,510 ft (1,984 m)	150 ft (46 m)	Cat. I (08)	Asphalt
14/32	3,068 ft (935 m)	60 ft (18 m)	––	Gravel/asphalt

=== Terminal ===
The Brandon Municipal Airport passenger terminal building is a 1,370-square-metre (14,700 ft^{2}) facility designed by Prairie Architects Inc. It is a Gold LEED-certified building for its sustainable, green and efficient design, construction and operation.

Construction of the terminal building began in 2015 and was carried out in three phases. Phase one saw the construction of 860 square metres (9,300 ft^{2}) of new terminal space that included an arrival & departures hall, baggage-handling facility, new check-in facilities, and a new baggage claim and carousel. Phase two involved the renovation and redevelopment of the existing terminal building that had been constructed on the site in 1970. This included the addition of a new Canadian Air Transport Security Authority (CATSA) screening area, a secure side departure lounge, accessible washroom facilities, expanded self-serve retail, new fiber-optic communication infrastructure, and extensive mechanical and energy efficiency improvements. Phase three joined phase one (new terminal) and phase two (redeveloped existing terminal) within a 12-hour timeframe. The airport remained open and fully functional throughout the entire construction process.

The new Brandon Airport terminal building was officially opened to the public on May 10, 2017.

=== Other facilities ===
Brandon Flight Centre FBO maintains aircraft hangar facilities at Brandon Municipal Airport and provides aviation fuel, aircraft deicing, and other aviation services 24-hours. Maple Leaf Aviation Ltd provides aircraft maintenance and aviation services and also maintains aircraft hangar facilities at the airport.

== Airlines and destinations ==
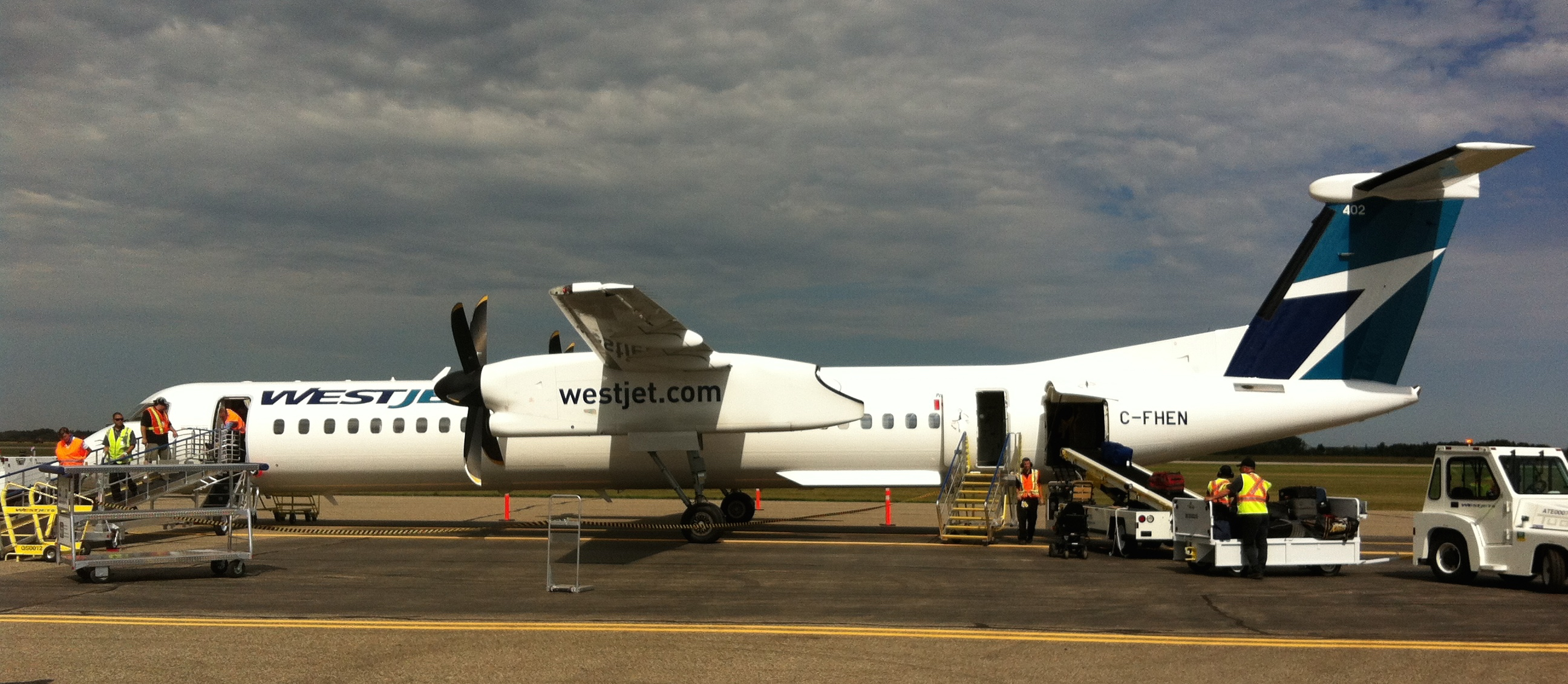
A WestJet Encore Bombardier Q400 at Brandon Airport

=== Passenger ===
Airlines	Destinations
WestJet Encore	Calgary

== Ground transportation ==
=== Car ===
Brandon Municipal Airport is accessible by car from Manitoba Highway 10, approximately 2 kilometres (1.2 mi) north of the Trans-Canada Highway.

Car rental services provided by Enterprise Rent-A-Car are available inside the terminal building.

=== Taxi ===
Numerous Brandon taxicab companies provide 24-hour licensed taxi service at Brandon Airport, including wheelchair accessible units.

=== Shuttle ===
Brandon Air Shuttle provides shuttle service from Brandon Municipal Airport to Dauphin and other communities in Westman and Parkland regions. Daily shuttle service is available and must be pre-booked.

== See also ==
- List of airports in Manitoba
