= RCAF Station Paulson =

Former military airfield

- Near Dauphin, Manitoba in Canada

Site information
- Operator: Formerly Royal Canadian Air Force

Location
- Location within Manitoba

Site history
- Fate: Sold, reverted to agricultural use.

Garrison information
- Garrison: No. 7 Bombing and Gunnery School

Airfield information
- Identifiers: IATA: none, ICAO: none
- Elevation: 884 ft (269 m) AMSL
Runways
Direction	Length and surface
14/32	2,700 ft (820 m) Hard Surface
8/26	2,700 ft (820 m) Hard Surface
2/20	2,700 ft (820 m) Hard Surface

RCAF Station Paulson was a Second World War, British Commonwealth Air Training Plan facility located near Dauphin, Manitoba, Canada.

== History ==
The base was home to No. 7 Bombing and Gunnery School. The proximity to a lake (Dauphin Lake) was important since the lake could be used for bombing and gunnery practice. Wing Commander W. I. Riddell was the first commanding officer when the school opened in 1941. The station magazine was the "Paulson Post". The school closed 2 Feb 1945 and the Station was decommissioned shortly after. The former airbase was abandoned and has reverted to agricultural use.

=== Aerodrome ===
In approximately 1942 the aerodrome was listed as RCAF Aerodrome - Paulson, Manitoba at 51°08′N 99°52′W with a variation of 13 degrees east and elevation of 884 ft (269 m). Three runways were listed as follows:

Runway Name	Length	Width	Surface
14/32	2,700 ft (820 m)	150 ft (46 m)	Hard surfaced
8/26	2,700 ft (820 m)	150 ft (46 m)	Hard surfaced
2/20	2,700 ft (820 m)	150 ft (46 m)	Hard surfaced

== RCAF Station Paulson today ==
Currently the runways are overgrown but they and the footprints of the buildings are visible in satellite imagery of the area with the foundations of the hangars being most visible due to their lack of overgrowth. There are still a few concrete buildings that are partially standing which are visible from Provincial Trunk Highway 20 which passes near by.
