= RCAF Station Estevan =

Former RCAF Station

- Near Estevan, Saskatchewan in Canada

Site information
- Operator: Formerly Royal Canadian Air Force

Location
- Location within Saskatchewan

Airfield information
- Identifiers: IATA: none, ICAO: none
- Elevation: 1,875 ft (572 m) AMSL
Runways
Direction	Length and surface
18/36	2,700 ft (820 m) Hard Surface
18/36	3,200 ft (980 m) Hard Surface
12/30	2,700 ft (820 m) Hard Surface
6/24	2,700 ft (820 m) Hard Surface
6/24	3,200 ft (980 m) Hard Surface

RCAF Station Estevan was a World War II, British Commonwealth Air Training Plan (BCATP) base operated by the Royal Canadian Air Force (RCAF). It was located South of the City of Estevan, Saskatchewan, Canada.

== World War II (1942-4) ==
On 27 April 1942, the airfield became home to the Royal Air Force's, No. 38 Service Flying Training School(SFTS). Although the school was run by the Royal Air Force it and others were considered extensions of the British Commonwealth Training Plan until they were officially incorporated into the BCATP in 1942. The 38 SFTS flew Avro Anson twin-engine trainers until 11 Feb 1944, when 38 SFTS was disbanded.

=== Aerodrome information ===
In approximately 1942 the aerodrome was listed as RCAF Aerodrome - Estevan, Saskatchewan at 49°04′N 103°00′W with a variation of 16 degrees east and elevation of 1,875 ft (572 m). Five runways were listed as follows:

Runway Name	Length	Width	Surface
18/36	2,700 ft (820 m)	150 ft (46 m)	Hard surfaced
18/36	3,200 ft (980 m)	75 ft (23 m)	Hard surfaced
12/30	2,720 ft (830 m)	150 ft (46 m)	Hard surfaced
6/24	2,700 ft (820 m)	150 ft (46 m)	Hard surfaced
6/24	3,200 ft (980 m)	75 ft (23 m)	Hard surfaced

A review of Google Maps on 8 June 2018 shows the area that was once home to this facility is now an open pit mine. There is no visible evidence that the facility ever existed.

=== Relief landing field – Outram ===
A Relief Landing field for RCAF Station Estevan was located approximately 12 mi (19 km) west of Estevan, Saskatchewan. The Relief field was constructed in the typical triangular pattern. In approximately 1942 the aerodrome was listed as RCAF Aerodrome - Outram, Saskatchewan at 49°08′N 103°15′W with a variation of 16 degrees east and elevation of 1,895 ft (578 m). Three runways were listed as follows:

Runway Name	Length	Width	Surface
18/36	2,700 ft (820 m)	150 ft (46 m)	Hard surfaced
12/30	2,700 ft (820 m)	150 ft (46 m)	Hard surfaced
6/24	2,700 ft (820 m)	150 ft (46 m)	Hard surfaced

A review of Google Maps on 5 June 2018 shows a triangular pattern consistent with a now cultivated BCATP Aerodrome. But the coordinates stated above appear to be slightly off. Corrected coordinates are 49.130406°N 103.265059°W

=== Relief landing field – Chandler ===
The Secondary Relief Landing field for RCAF Station Estevan was located approximately 25 mi (40 km) north-west. The site was located east of the railway siding of Chandler, Saskatchewan. The Relief field was listed as Turf with a triangular runway layout. In approximately 1942 the aerodrome was listed as RCAF Aerodrome - Chandler, Saskatchewan at 49°19′N 103°24′W with a variation of 16 degrees east and elevation of 1,875 ft (572 m). The Aerodrome was listed as an All way field with three runways, they were listed as follows

Runway Name	Length	Width	Surface
1/19	3,500 ft (1,100 m)	500 ft (150 m)	Turf
13/31	4,400 ft (1,300 m)	500 ft (150 m)	Turf
7/25	3,500 ft (1,100 m)	500 ft (150 m)	Turf

A review of Google Maps on 8 June 2018 shows no visibility of an airfield at the posted coordinates. But nearby there appears to be the impression of a runway, this other site appears consistent with the c.1942 map. The possible coordinates are 49.322548°N 103.413232°W

== Post war ==
On 15 September 1946, 21 personnel of the Royal Canadian Air Force were killed at the airport when the C-47 Dakota transport carrying them back to Canada from Fargo, North Dakota crashed on the airport. The pilots had been transferring Cornell Aircraft back to the United States on the completion of the Lend Lease Agreement in place during the Second World War. The airmen were on the strength of No. 124 (Communications) Squadron, Rockcliffe, Ontario.

At some point after the war the decommissioned Station was demolished and an open pit coal mine has removed all traces of the former station.

Between the end of the war and the demolition of this facility the aerodrome was used as the Estevan Airport.

== Present day ==
There is no trace of the former station today.
