= RCAF Station Assiniboia =

- Near Congress, Saskatchewan in Canada

Site information
- Operator: Royal Air Force (1942); Central Manitoba Flying Training School (1942-4); Royal Canadian Air Force(1944)

Location
- Coordinates: 49°44′05″N 105°56′49″W

Site history
- In use: 1942-4

Garrison information
- Occupants: No. 34 EFTS (1942-4);No. 25 EFTS (1944)

Airfield information
- Identifiers: IATA: none, ICAO: none
- Elevation: 2,370 ft (720 m) AMSL
Runways
Direction	Length and surface
1/19	2,900 ft (880 m) Hard Surface
13/31	2,850 ft (870 m) Hard Surface
7/25	2,900 ft (880 m) Hard Surface

RCAF Station Assiniboia
- IATA: none; ICAO: none

Summary
- Owner/Operator: Royal Canadian Air Force
- Location: Rural Municipality of Lake of the Rivers No. 72, near Assiniboia, Saskatchewan
- Opened: February 11, 1942
- In use: 1942 - 1945
- Occupants: Royal Canadian Air Force/British Commonwealth Air Training Plan
- Elevation AMSL: 2,370 ft (720 m)

Map
- Location in Saskatchewan RCAF Station Assiniboia (Canada)

RCAF Station Assiniboia was a Second World War British Commonwealth Air Training Plan (BCATP) flying training station located near Assiniboia, Saskatchewan, Canada. It was operated and administered by the Royal Canadian Air Force (RCAF).

== History ==
=== World War II ===
RCAF Station Assiniboia became the home station of the Royal Air Force's, No. 34 Elementary Flying Training School (No. 34 EFTS) on 11 Feb 1942. On 6 Jul 1942 the RAF turned over administration of the School to the Winnipeg Flying Club, operating as the Central Manitoba Flying Training School Ltd. who operated the school until No 34 EFTS was redesignated No. 25 EFTS on 30 January 1944. No. 25 EFTS was operated by the RCAF until it was disbanded on 28 July 1944.

No. 34 EFTS trained pilots using the Cornell aircraft.

No. 25 EFTS used the Fairchild Cornell as their training aircraft.

On 2 Dec 1944 No. 204 Reserve Equipment Maintenance Satellite(REMS) was established at the station. Other units located at Assiniboia until the end of the war in 1945 include No. 41 Pre-Aircrew Training School, and No. 403 Aircraft Holding Unit.

During World War II RCAF Station Assiniboia produced 2,496 pilots, the majority belonging to the RAF. The station also had a relief (emergency) landing field, located near Lethburn, Saskatchewan.

=== Aerodrome information ===
In approximately 1942 the aerodrome was listed as RCAF Aerodrome - Assiniboia, Saskatchewan at 49°44′N 105°57′W with a variation of 18 degrees east and elevation of 2,370 ft (720 m). Three runways were listed as follows:

Runway Name	Length	Width	Surface
1/19	2,900 ft (880 m)	150 ft (46 m)	Hard surfaced
13/31	2,850 ft (870 m)	150 ft (46 m)	Hard surfaced
7/25	2,900 ft (880 m)	150 ft (46 m)	Hard surfaced

=== Relief landing field – Lethburn ===
A relief Landing field for RCAF Station Assiniboia was located approximately 6 mi (9.7 km) south. The site was located east of the town of Assiniboia, Saskatchewan. In approximately 1942 the aerodrome was listed as RCAF Aerodrome - Lethburn, Saskatchewan at 49°38′N 105°55′W with a variation of 18 degrees east and elevation of 2,350 ft (720 m). The relief field was a square, turf, all way field measuring 2,640 ft (800 m) x 2,640 ft (800 m). A review of Google Maps satellite imagery on 7 June 2018 shows no details indicating a airfield at the listed coordinates.

== Present day ==
The aerodrome is now the Assiniboia Airport.

== See also ==
- List of airports in Saskatchewan
