= RCAF Station Neepawa =

- Near Neepawa, Manitoba in Canada

Location
- Coordinates: 50°14′N 099°30′W

Site history
- In use: 1942-44

Garrison information
- Occupants: No. 35 E.F.T.S.(1942-4); No. 26 E.F.T.S.(1944)

Airfield information
- Elevation: 1,275 ft (389 m) AMSL
Runways
Direction	Length and surface
15/33	2,600 ft (790 m) Hard Surface
9/27	2,550 ft (780 m) Hard Surface
3/21	2,600 ft (790 m) Hard Surface

RCAF Station Neepawa was a Second World War British Commonwealth Air Training Plan (BCATP) station located near Neepawa, Manitoba, Canada. It was operated and administered by the Royal Canadian Air Force (RCAF).

The station is now operating as the Neepawa Airport.

== History ==
RCAF Station Neepawa was originally opened by the Royal Air Force on 30 March 1942 near the community of Neepawa, Manitoba, constructed as a component of the British Commonwealth Air Training Plan. That year, on the 24th of August, it was taken over by the Moncton Flying Club.

RCAF Station Neepawa was originally home to No. 35 Elementary Flying Training School (No. 35 E.F.T.S.).

Tens of thousands of eager BCATP trainees from across the globe spent time in and around small towns throughout Canada, often experiencing severe winter weather for the first time. Their lives in Manitoba, on and off base, are dramatized in the 1993 film For the Moment, starring New Zealand actor Russell Crowe.

On 30 January 1944, No. 35 E.F.T.S. was re-designated No. 26 E.F.T.S. RCAF Station Neepawa was thereafter closed on 25 August 1944.

== Facility ==
=== Aerodrome ===
In c. 1942, the aerodrome was listed at 50°14′N 99°30′W with a variation 12.5 degrees east and elevation of 1,275 ft (389 m). Three runways were listed as follows:

Runway Name	Length	Width	Surface
15/33	2,600 ft (790 m)	150 ft (46 m)	Hard surfaced
9/27	2,550 ft (780 m)	150 ft (46 m)	Hard surfaced
3/21	2,600 ft (790 m)	150 ft (46 m)	Hard surfaced

=== Relief landing field – Eden ===
The primary Relief Landing Field (R1) for RCAF Station Neepawa was located 1 mi (1.6 km) east of the unincorporated community of Eden, Manitoba. The relief field consisted of an aircraft hangar, a small landing strip and a maintenance shop. The location of the field was 50.37300°N 99.43850°W.
