= RCAF Station Fort Macleod =

Military airfield in Alberta, Canada (1940–1944)

- IATA: none; ICAO: none

Summary
- Location: south of Fort Macleod, Alberta
- Built: 1940
- In use: 1940-1944
- Coordinates: 49°42′00″N 113°25′00″W
- Interactive map of RCAF Station Fort Macleod

RCAF Station Fort Macleod was a World War II British Commonwealth Air Training Plan (BCATP) flying training station. Administrative and operational control was the responsibility of the Royal Canadian Air Force (RCAF). The old station is located south of Fort Macleod, Alberta, Canada.

No. 7 Service Flying Training School (SFTS) began operation in December 1940, flying the twin engine Anson. The school closed on November 17, 1944.

After the war the station remained open and hosted No. 1 Repair Equipment and Maintenance Unit (1 REMU) which was responsible for storing and repairing RCAF aircraft. The station is now Fort Macleod Airport. Many of the old buildings used during the BCATP days can still be seen. A relief landing field was located near Granum.

Singer-songwriter Joni Mitchell was born here in 1943: her father, a flight lieutenant in the RCAF, was a flying instructor.

== Aerodrome Information ==
The airfield was constructed in a typical BCATP wartime pattern, with six runways formed in an overlaid triangle. In approximately 1942 the aerodrome was listed at 49°42′N 113°25′W with a Var. 23 degrees E and elevation of 3,125 feet (952 m). Six runways were listed as follows:

Runway Name	Length	Width	Surface
5/23	3,000 feet (914 m)	100 feet (30 m)	Hard surfaced
5/23	2,950 feet (899 m)	100 feet (30 m)	Hard surfaced
16/34	3,000 feet (914 m)	100 feet (30 m)	Hard surfaced
16/34	3,000 feet (914 m)	100 feet (30 m)	Hard surfaced
10/28	3,000 feet (914 m)	100 feet (30 m)	Hard surfaced
10/28	3,000 feet (914 m)	100 feet (30 m)	Hard surfaced

== Relief Landing Field - Granum ==
The airfield was constructed in a typical BCATP wartime pattern, with three runways forming a triangle and an apron housing a combined hangar and control tower off of the northeast corner. In approximately 1942 the aerodrome was listed at 49°49′N 113°27′W with a Var. 23 degrees E and elevation of 3,255 feet (992 m). Three runways were listed as follows:

Runway Name	Length	Width	Surface
13/31	3,000 feet (914 m)	100 feet (30 m)	Hard surfaced
6/24	3,050 feet (930 m)	100 feet (30 m)	Hard surfaced
1/19	3,000 feet (914 m)	100 feet (30 m)	Hard surfaced

== Relief Landing Field - Standoff ==
The airfield was constructed in a typical BCATP wartime pattern as a large grass triangle. In approximately 1942 the aerodrome was listed at 49°33′N 113°20′W with a Var. 22 1/2 degrees E and elevation of 3,290 feet (1,003 m). Three runways were listed as follows:

Runway Name	Length	Width	Surface
16/34	3,900 feet (1,189 m)	600 feet (183 m)	Turf
10/28	3,900 feet (1,189 m)	600 feet (183 m)	Turf
4/22	3,900 feet (1,189 m)	600 feet (183 m)	Turf
