= RCAF Station Saskatoon =

Air force training base

- Near Saskatoon, Saskatchewan in Canada

Site information
- Operator: Formerly Royal Canadian Air Force

Location
- Location within Saskatchewan

Airfield information
- Identifiers: IATA: none, ICAO: none
- Elevation: 1,636 ft (499 m) AMSL
Runways
Direction	Length and surface
16/34	2,640 ft (800 m) Hard Surface
16/34	2,620 ft (800 m) Hard Surface
11/29	2,720 ft (830 m) Hard Surface
11/29	2,700 ft (820 m) Hard Surface
7/25	2,480 ft (760 m) Hard Surface
7/25	2,640 ft (800 m) Hard Surface

RCAF Station Saskatoon was a World War II British Commonwealth Air Training Plan (BCATP) base operated by the Royal Canadian Air Force (RCAF). It was located North of the City of Saskatoon, Saskatchewan, Canada.

== World War II (1940-5) ==
On 16 September 1940, the airfield became home to No. 4 Service Flying Training School (SFTS), one of dozens of military air training facilities created under the BCATP. This station flew Avro Anson and Cessna Crane twin-engine trainers until 30 March 1945, when 4 SFTS was disbanded. One of the many pilots to be trained at the airfield was Les Munro, later to fly on the famous Dambusters Raid.

=== Aerodrome Information ===
In approximately 1942 the aerodrome was listed as RCAF & D of T Aerodrome - Saskatoon, Saskatchewan at 52°11′N 106°41′W with a variation of 20 degrees east and elevation of 1,636 ft (499 m). Six runways were listed as follows:

Runway Name	Length	Width	Surface
16/34	2,640 ft (800 m)	100 ft (30 m)	Hard surfaced
16/34	2,620 ft (800 m)	100 ft (30 m)	Hard surfaced
11/29	2,720 ft (830 m)	100 ft (30 m)	Hard surfaced
11/29	2,700 ft (820 m)	100 ft (30 m)	Hard surfaced
7/25	2,480 ft (760 m)	100 ft (30 m)	Hard surfaced
7/25	2,640 ft (800 m)	100 ft (30 m)	Hard surfaced

=== Relief landing field – Vanscoy ===
A Relief Landing field for RCAF Station Saskatoon was located approximately 15 mi (24 km) south-west. The site was located north-west of the town of Vanscoy, Saskatchewan. The Relief field was constructed in the typical triangular pattern. In approximately 1942 the aerodrome was listed as RCAF Aerodrome - Vanscoy, Saskatchewan at 52°02′N 107°02′W with a variation of 20 degrees east and elevation of 1,662 ft (507 m). Three runways were listed as follows

Runway Name	Length	Width	Surface
8/26	3,000 ft (910 m)	100 ft (30 m)	Hard surfaced
3/21	2,830 ft (860 m)	100 ft (30 m)	Hard surfaced
14/32	2,750 ft (840 m)	100 ft (30 m)	Hard surfaced

A review of Google Maps on 5 June 2018 shows little visibility of the airfield. But the coordinates stated above appear to be off. A triangular pattern consistent with a now cultivated BCATP Aerodrome appears on the ground at 52.018614°N 107.037792°W

=== Relief landing field – Osler ===
A probable Relief Landing field for RCAF Station Saskatoon was located approximately 6 mi (9.7 km) north-east. The site was located east of the town of Osler, Saskatchewan. In approximately 1942 the aerodrome was listed as RCAF Aerodrome - Osler, Saskatchewan at 52°22′N 106°31′W with a variation of 20 degrees east and elevation of 1,671 ft (509 m). The Aerodrome was listed as a "All way field" with three runways, as follows:

Runway Name	Length	Width	Surface
13/31	3,240 ft (990 m)	800 ft (240 m)	Turf
7/25	3,240 ft (990 m)	800 ft (240 m)	Turf
3/21	3,500 ft (1,100 m)	800 ft (240 m)	Turf

A review of Google Maps on 5 June 2018 shows no visibility of an airfield near the posted coordinates.

== Post War - Military Use ==
The RCAF returned to the city 1 April 1947 with the formation of 406 Tactical Bomber Squadron (Auxiliary). 406 (Auxiliary) Squadron initially flew Harvard trainers, and then B-25 Mitchell light bombers. The squadron changed to light transport/utility duties with the C-45 Expeditor and the De Havilland Otter.

As a result of the RCAF's post-war expansion, the RCAF re-acquired the military portion of the property and RCAF Station Saskatoon re-opened as an air training facility in October 1950. That same year, No. 23 Wing was formed to oversee 406 (Linx) Squadron and several other Auxiliary (Reserve) Squadrons in Western Canada. Permanent Married Quarters were built at the end of 1952, and the following year, the Air Marshall Curtis School opened for the children of station personnel.

No. 1 Advanced Flying School opened at the station in 1952, one of the many Flying Training Schools opened across Canada to train Royal Air Force, RCAF and NATO aircrews. Students at the school trained on Mitchell Bombers and Expeditor aircraft trainers. The school was closed in 1962.

The RCAF Central Flying School was located at the Station from 1959 to 1962. Other units at the station included, No. 3043 Technical Training Unit (Auxiliary) and No. 4002 Medical Unit (Auxiliary).

In 1956, the Instrument Flying School moved to Saskatoon from RCAF Station Centralia.

In 1962, control of RCAF Station Saskatoon was transferred from Training Command to Air Transport Command, but this change would be short-lived. RCAF Station Saskatoon closed in 1964 and both 406 Squadron and 23 Wing were disbanded.

As a result of defence cutbacks, the flying schools and No. 406 Squadron were disbanded in early 1964.

For the next 15 years, the airport was the site of RCAF Detachment No. 1005 Technical Support Depot. The depot oversaw storage for retired aircraft that were awaiting sale or disposal. A trip to this facility in the early 1970s would have revealed parked Dakotas, Neptune antisubmarine aircraft and T-33 trainers. This storage facility was overseen by the Canadian Forces 407 Technical Services Detachment, which contracted with Bristol Aerospace for this work. This detachment remained at the Saskatoon Airport until closing in 1978.

== Present Day ==
The Saskatoon John G. Diefenbaker International Airport is located on the former RCAF Station Saskatoon site. Some of the former RCAF buildings remain today.
