= Pendleton Airport =

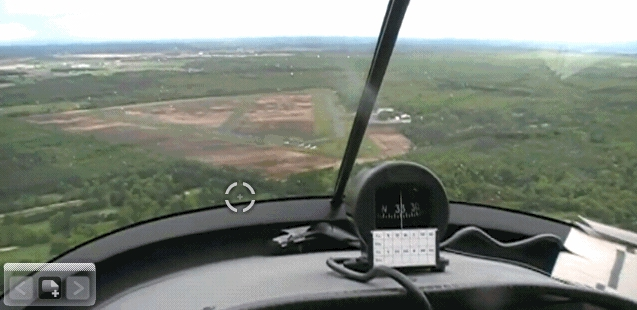
- A Sinus landing on grass runway
- IATA: none; ICAO: none; TC LID: CNF3

Summary
- Airport type: Public
- Operator: Gatineau Gliding Club
- Location: Pendleton, Ontario
- Time zone: EST (UTC−05:00)
  - Summer (DST): EDT (UTC−04:00)
- Elevation AMSL: 260 ft (79 m)
- Coordinates: 45°29′10″N 075°05′46″W
- Website: Gatineau Gliding Club

Map
- Location in Ontario

Runways
Direction	Length		Surface
Direction	ft	m	Surface
08/26	2,550	777	Old asphalt
13/31	2,650	808	Turf
17/35	2,550	777	Old asphalt
- Source: Canada Flight Supplement

Pendleton Airport (TC LID: CNF3) is located 3 nautical miles (5.6 km; 3.5 mi) northwest of Pendleton, Ontario, Canada, east of Ottawa. The airfield is currently operated by the Gatineau Gliding Club.

== History ==
=== World War II (1942–1945) ===
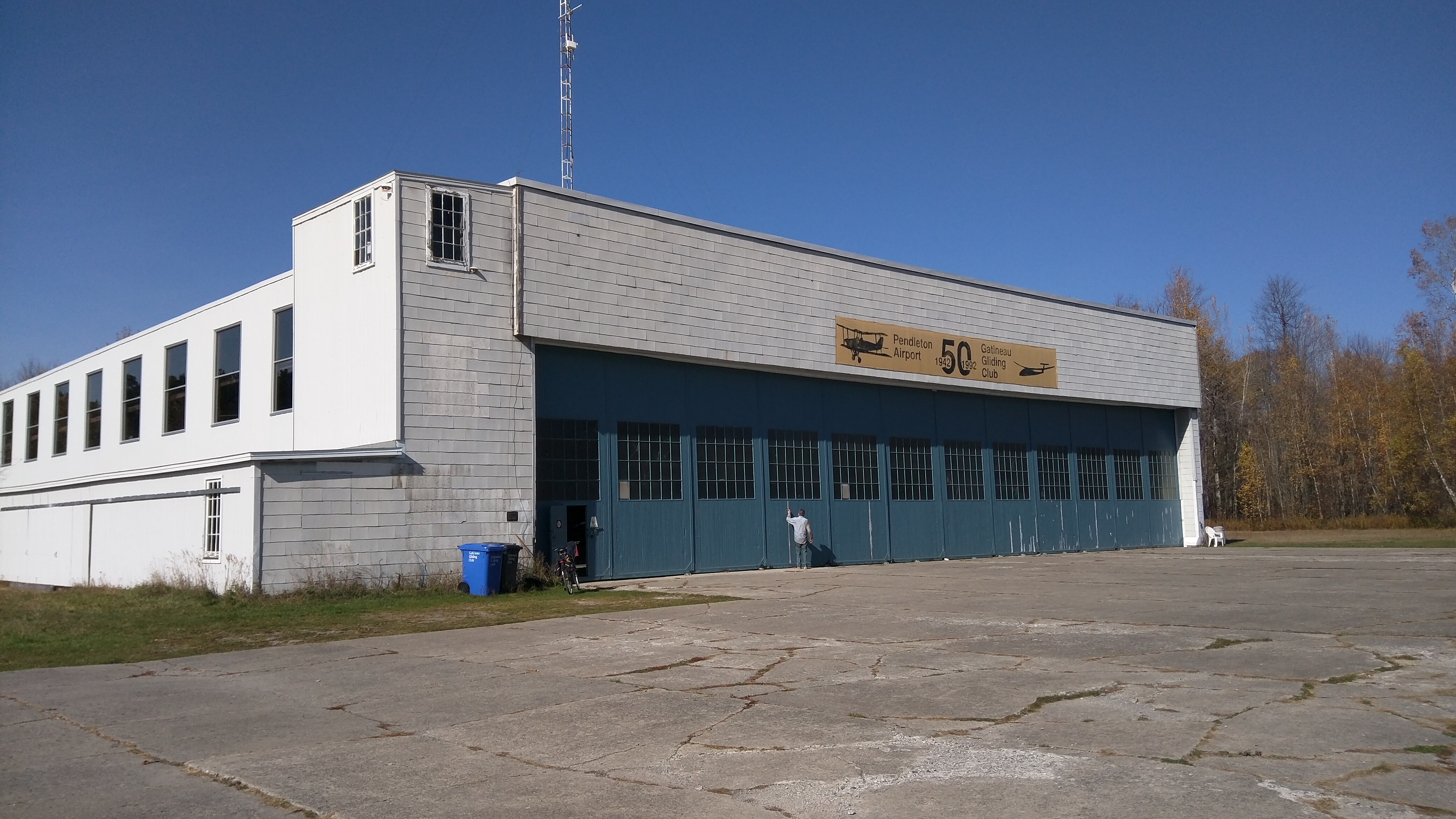
Second-World-War hangar at Pendleton Airport

During the Second World War, Pendleton Airport was established as RCAF Station Pendleton and hosted No. 10 Elementary Flying Training School for the British Commonwealth Air Training Plan after the school moved from Hamilton in 1942. The school provided initial pilot training on Tiger Moth and Finch aircraft. While most of the airports involved in the plan have either closed or gone through extensive changes, Pendleton still preserves most of the original character of a BCATP airport: it has the original three short runways arranged in a triangle (though some are in disrepair), and several of the original World War II buildings, including the main hangar.

==== Aerodrome information ====
In approximately 1942 the aerodrome was listed as RCAF Aerodrome - Pendleton, Ontario at 45°29′N 75°06′W with a variation of 14 degrees east and elevation of 260 ft (79 m). Three runways were listed as follows:

Runway name	Length	Width	Surface
17/35	2,550 ft (780 m)	100 ft (30 m)	Hard surfaced
13/31	2,550 ft (780 m)	100 ft (30 m)	Hard surfaced
8/26	2,550 ft (780 m)	100 ft (30 m)	Hard surfaced

=== Post-war (1945–present) ===
The Gatineau Gliding Club purchased the airfield from Crown Assets in 1961, and has been the owner since then. The club is a non-profit organization dedicated to promoting motorless flight in Canada.

== See also ==
- List of airports in the Ottawa area
