= RCAF Station Brandon =

- Near Brandon, Manitoba in Canada

Location
- Coordinates: 49°55′N 099°57′W

Site history
- In use: 1942-44

Airfield information
- Elevation: 1,322 ft (403 m) AMSL
Runways
Direction	Length and surface
8/26	2,700 ft (820 m) Hard Surface
8/26	2,700 ft (820 m) Hard Surface
2/20	2,720 ft (830 m) Hard Surface
2/20	2,720 ft (830 m) Hard Surface
14/32	2,700 ft (820 m) Hard Surface
14/32	2,700 ft (820 m) Hard Surface

RCAF Station Brandon was a Second World War British Commonwealth Air Training Plan (BCATP) station located near Brandon, Manitoba, Canada. It was operated and administered by the Royal Canadian Air Force (RCAF).

== History ==
=== World War II ===
The facility was originally built by the Department of National Defense in 1941, for use as a Royal Canadian Air Force flight training school under the British Commonwealth Air Training Plan. On 16 May 1941, No. 12 Service Flying Training School was established at RCAF Station Brandon. The school trained pilots on more advanced multi-engined aircraft including the Cessna Crane and Avro Anson. On 30 March 1945, the school was closed in conjunction with the end of the Second World War. .

Portions of the former RCAF station are now classified as a National Historic Site of Canada. The Commonwealth Air Training Plan Museum is a popular tourist attraction located at the former station that commemorates the BCATP and the former station.

=== Aerodrome information ===
In approximately 1942 the aerodrome was listed as RCAF Aerodrome - Brandon, Manitoba at 49°55′N 99°57′W with a variation of 13 degrees east and elevation of 1,322 ft (403 m). Six runways were listed as follows:

Runway Name	Length	Width	Surface
8/26	2,700 ft (820 m)	100 ft (30 m)	Hard surfaced
8/26	2,700 ft (820 m)	100 ft (30 m)	Hard surfaced
2/20	2,720 ft (830 m)	100 ft (30 m)	Hard surfaced
2/20	2,720 ft (830 m)	100 ft (30 m)	Hard surfaced
14/32	2,700 ft (820 m)	100 ft (30 m)	Hard surfaced
14/32	2,700 ft (820 m)	100 ft (30 m)	Hard surfaced

=== Relief landing field – Chater ===
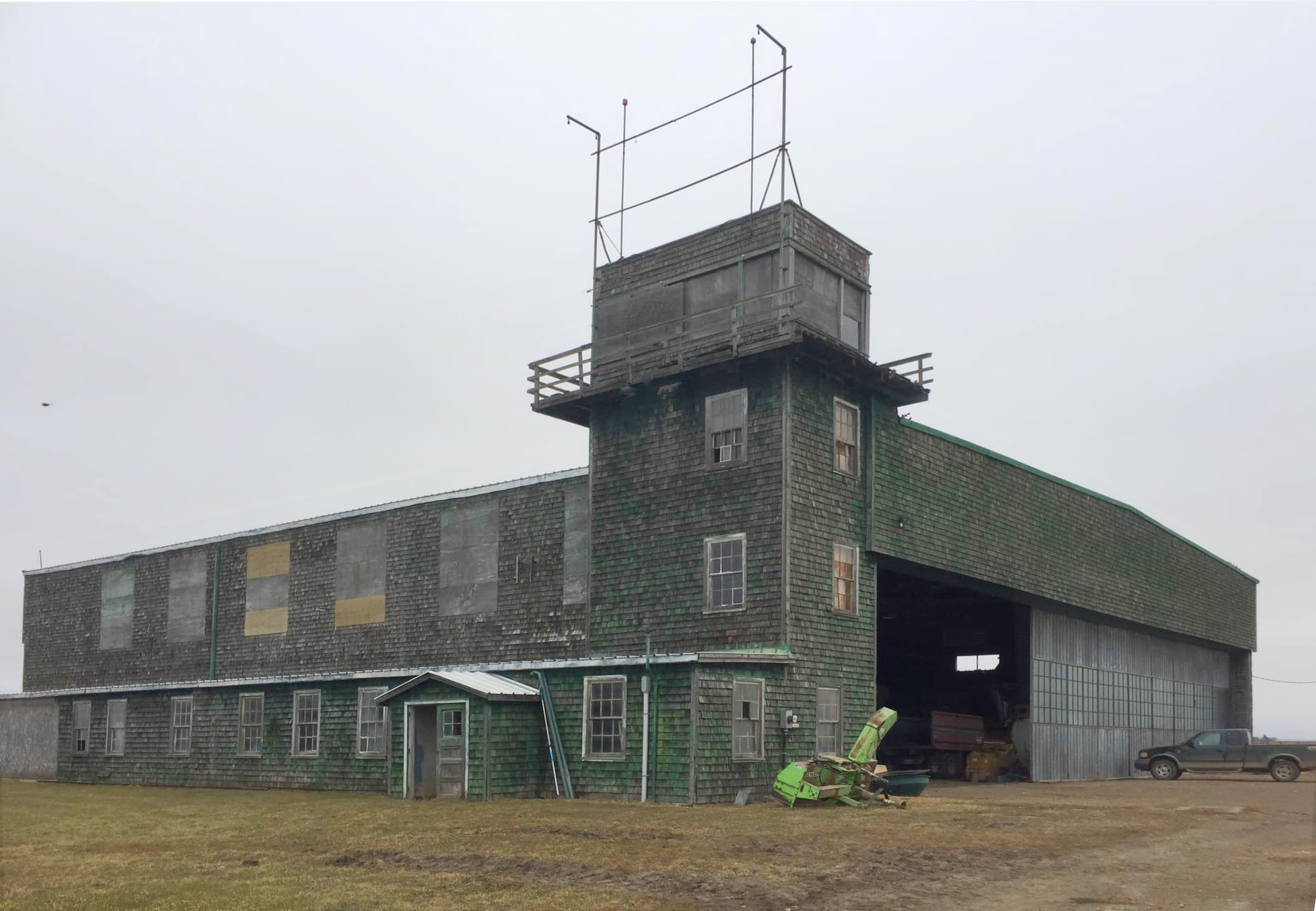
The hangar at RCAF Chater in November 2019

A relief landing field for RCAF Station Brandon was located approximately 6 mi (9.7 km) east. The site was located 5 miles northeast of the town of Chater, Manitoba. The relief field was constructed in the typical triangular pattern. In approximately 1942 the aerodrome was listed as RCAF Aerodrome - Chater, Manitoba at 49°55′N 99°48′W with a variation of 13 degrees east and elevation of 1,333 ft (406 m). Three runways were listed as follows:

Runway Name	Length	Width	Surface
8/26	2,700 ft (820 m)	150 ft (46 m)	Hard surfaced
2/20	2,700 ft (820 m)	150 ft (46 m)	Hard surfaced
14/32	2,700 ft (820 m)	150 ft (46 m)	Hard surfaced

At some point after the war the former relief field was sold and decommissioned as an aerodrome. The aerodrome has been declared abandoned. A review of Google Maps on 7 June 2018 shows a very visible airfield at the listed coordinates. But runway orientation is flipped top to bottom with the drawing in the book from c.1942.

=== Relief landing field – Douglas ===
The second relief landing field for RCAF Station Brandon was located approximately 14 mi (23 km) east. The site was located north east of the town of Douglas, Manitoba. In approximately 1942 the aerodrome was listed as RCAF Aerodrome - Douglas, Manitoba at 49°55′N 99°39′W with a variation of 12.5 degrees east and elevation of 1,262 ft (385 m). The Relief field was listed as Turf all way, however no dimensional data was provided. A review of Google Maps on 7 June 2018 shows no visibility of an airfield near the posted coordinates.

== Present day ==
The airport is now operating as the Brandon Municipal Airport
