= RCAF Station Souris =

- Souris, Manitoba; Near Souris, Manitoba in Canada

Site information
- Operator: Formerly Royal Canadian Air Force

Location
- Coordinates: 49°38′N 100°12′W

Site history
- In use: 1943-1945

Airfield information
- Identifiers: IATA: none, ICAO: none
- Elevation: 1,450 ft (440 m) AMSL
Runways
Direction	Length and surface
2L/20R	2,700 ft (820 m) hard surface
2R/20L	2,800 ft (850 m) hard surface
14L/32R	2,700 ft (820 m) hard surface
14R/32L	2,700 ft (820 m) hard surface
8/26	2,800 ft (850 m) hard surface

RCAF Station Souris was a Second World War British Commonwealth Air Training Plan (BCATP) station located near Souris, Manitoba, Canada. It was operated and administered by the Royal Canadian Air Force (RCAF).

== History ==
=== World War II ===
Souris hosted No. 17 Service Flying Training School (No. 17 SFTS). The school opened 8 March 1943 and closed 30 March 1945. Aircraft used included the Harvard and Anson. Emergency, or relief, landing fields were located at Hartney and Elgin.

=== Aerodrome information ===
In approximately 1942 the aerodrome was listed as RCAF Aerodrome - Souris, Manitoba at 49°38′N 100°12′W with a variation of 14 degrees east and elevation of 1,450 ft (440 m). The aerodrome was listed as under construction and serviceable. Five runways were listed as follows:

Runway name	Length	Width	Surface
2/20	2,800 ft (850 m)	100 ft (30 m)	Hard surfaced
2/20	2,700 ft (820 m)	100 ft (30 m)	Hard surfaced
14/32	2,700 ft (820 m)	100 ft (30 m)	Hard surfaced
14/32	2,700 ft (820 m)	100 ft (30 m)	Hard surfaced
8/26	2,800 ft (850 m)	100 ft (30 m)	Hard surfaced

A review of Google Maps on 10 June 2018 shows that only the inner 14/32 runway remains as hard surfaced. The outer 14/32 runway and the two former 2/20 runways have been reclaimed for agricultural use. A review of the Souris Glenwood Industrial Air Park page shows the former 8/26 runway is still maintained as turf.

=== Relief landing field – Hartney ===
The primary relief landing field (R1) for RCAF Station Souris was located approximately 19 miles south-west. The site was located approximately 1 mile south of the now unincorporated community of Hartney, Manitoba. The relief field was laid out in the standard triangular pattern. In approximately 1942 the aerodrome was listed as RCAF Aerodrome - Hartney, Manitoba at 49°27′N 100°31′W with a variation of 14 degrees east and elevation of 1,450 ft (440 m). Three runways were listed as follows:

Runway name	Length	Width	Surface
2/20	2,700 ft (820 m)	150 ft (46 m)	Hard
14/32	2,700 ft (820 m)	150 ft (46 m)	Hard
8/26	2,700 ft (820 m)	150 ft (46 m)	Hard

A review of Google Maps on 10 June 2018 shows a clear outline of the aerodrome at the posted coordinates.

=== Relief landing field – Elgin ===
The secondary relief landing field (R2) for RCAF Station Souris was located approximately 10 miles south. The site was located approximately 3 miles north of the unincorporated community of Elgin, Manitoba. The relief field was turf with a triangular runway layout. In approximately 1942 the aerodrome was listed as RCAF Aerodrome - Elgin, Manitoba at 49°29′N 100°15′W with a variation of 13.5 degrees east and elevation of 1,495 ft (456 m). Three runways were listed as follows:

Runway name	Length	Width	Surface
2/20	3,300 ft (1,000 m)	---	Turf
14/32	3,300 ft (1,000 m)	---	Turf
8/26	3,600 ft (1,100 m)	---	Turf

A review of Google Maps on 10 June 2018 shows no identifiable trace of the former aerodrome in the vicinity of the posted coordinates.

== Present ==
The aerodrome is now the Souris Glenwood Industrial Air Park.
