= RCAF Station Hamilton =

Former military airfield in Ontario

- Canada

Site information
- Owner: Department of National Defence
- Operator: Royal Canadian Air Force

Location
- Location within Ontario

Site history
- Built: c. 1940
- In use: 1964

Garrison information
- Garrison: No. 10 Elementary Flying Training School; No. 33 Air Navigation School

RCAF Station Hamilton was an air force base of the Royal Canadian Air Force located in Mount Hope, Ontario, Canada, 15 mi (24 km) south of Hamilton.

== History ==
=== World War II ===
During the Second World War, it was a base for the British Commonwealth Air Training Plan, teaching pilots from allied commonwealth nations the basics of elementary flying. Schools located here were No. 10 Elementary Flying Training School (No. 10 EFTS), which flew De Havilland Tiger Moth and Fleet Finch aircraft, No. 33 Air Navigation School (No. 33 ANS), which flew the Avro Anson. No. 10 EFTS relocated to RCAF Station Pendleton in 1942; No. 33 ANS closed in October 1944, and No. 1 Wireless School (No. 1 WS) which moved from Montreal on 14 September 1944.

=== Aerodrome information ===
In approximately 1942 the aerodrome was listed as RCAF Aerodrome - Hamilton (Mount Hope) Ontario at 43°10′N 79°56′W with a variation of 7 degrees west and elevation of 771 ft (235 m). Three runways were listed as follows:

Runway Name	Length	Width	Surface
11/29	2,789 ft (850 m)	150 ft (46 m)	*Not Specified
16/34	2,789 ft (850 m)	150 ft (46 m)	*Not Specified
10/28	2,965 ft (904 m)	150 ft (46 m)	*Not Specified

=== Postwar ===
After the war, it became a base for Hamilton 424 Reserve Squadron, supported by regular force personnel. During the postwar years, 424 Squadron, under Air Defence Command, flew the P-51 Mustang and Vampire jet fighter. Later, under Air Transport Command, 424 flew the Beechcraft Expeditor and the De Havilland Otter. Other units located here included No. 16 Wing (Auxiliary), No. 2424 Aircraft Control and Warning Squadron (Auxiliary), which trained Pinetree Line radar operators, and the Royal Canadian Naval Reserve's No. 1 Training Air Group. The airport was known as Mount Hope Airport for many years and today is called the John C. Munro Hamilton International Airport. The airport is also the home of the Canadian Warplane Heritage Museum.

== Closure ==
In the 1960s, the Canadian military was reorganized and eventually unified. The reorganization resulted in many military bases being closed, including Hamilton. The station was closed in 1964.
