= 1949 in aviation =

This is a list of aviation-related events from 1949:

== Events ==
- Aerolíneas Argentinas is established.
- Royal Jordanian Air Force is formed as the Arab League Air Force.
- Republic of Korea Air Force is formed.
- Lebanese Air Force is formed.
- The de Havilland Sea Hornets of No. 801 Squadron, Fleet Air Arm, embark aboard the Royal Navy aircraft carrier HMS Implacable, becoming the first British twin-engined single-seat aircraft to operate from an aircraft carrier.
- Bahrain-based Gulf Aviation, the forerunner of Gulf Air, is founded. It will begin flight operations in July 1950.
- The American Section of the International League of Aviators awards the National Trophy, a Harmon Trophy awarded from 1926 to 1938 to the outstanding aviator of the year in each of the 21 member countries of the now-defunct League and since 1945 by the American Section, for the last time. The trophies it presented from 1945 to 1949 stirred much controversy, with the awards going largely unrecognized.
- The crew of a Maszovlet Lisiunov Li-2P (registration HA-LIE) illegally flies the airliner out of Hungary and lands at Munich in Allied-occupied Germany.
- Early 1949 – The Royal Navy experiments with landing undercarriage-less aircraft aboard aircraft carriers, landing an experimental de Havilland Sea Vampire F.21 with strengthened undersides with its landing gear retracted aboard HMS Warrior. Warrior has rubberized deck surfaces installed for the experiments.
- Mid-1949 – The United States Air Force consists of 48 groups.

=== January ===
- The United States' force of atomic bomb assembly teams has risen from two in mid-1948 to seven. Each atomic bomb requires two days to be assembled for use.
- January 2 – Taking off from Boeing Field in Seattle, in fog after an only partially successful de-icing, a Seattle Air Charter Douglas C-47A-50-DL Skytrain (registration NC79025) drags its left wing along the ground just after becoming airborne, lands outside the runway, crashes into a hangar, and bursts into flames, killing 14 of the 30 people on board.
- January 4 – Twenty-two hijackers commandeer a Maszovlet Douglas C-47 Skytrain with 25 people aboard during a domestic flight over Hungary from Pécs to Budapest and force it to fly them to Munich in the American occupation zone in Allied-occupied Germany.
- January 7 – On the last day of the 1948 Arab-Israeli War, five Royal Egyptian Air Force Supermarine Spitfires strafe an Israeli motorized column near Rafah, setting three trucks on fire before departing. When four Royal Air Force (RAF) Spitfires of No. 208 Squadron arrive on the scene to investigate, the column mistakes them for additional Egyptian aircraft and shoots one down. Two Israeli Air Force Spitfires then arrive, mistake the three surviving RAF Spitfires for Egyptian aircraft, and shoot all three of them down. Seven British Hawker Tempests of No. 213 Squadron, eight Tempests of No. 6 Squadron and four more Spitfires of No. 208 Squadron sent to search for the four missing No. 208 Squadron fighters encounter four Israeli Spitfires over Rafah, and in the ensuring dogfight the Israelis shoot down one No. 213 Squadron Tempest.
- January 9 – Chuck Yeager makes the only conventional take-off from a runway ever attempted in a Bell X-1, then climbs to 23,000 feet (7,000 m) in 90 seconds.
- January 12 – Flying the Beechcraft 35 Bonanza Waikiki Beech, William P. "Bill" Odom takes off from Hickam Field, Hawaii, intending to set a new light-plane nonstop distance record by flying to Teterboro, New Jersey. He encounters bad weather near Reno, Nevada, that forces him to turn around and land at Oakland, California. Although falling well short of his goal, he nonetheless sets a new light-plane nonstop distance flying record by flying 2,406.87 miles (2,091.51 nmi; 3,873.48 km) from Hawaii to Oakland. He has remained airborne for 22 hours 6 minutes.
- January 16 – During a one-hour domestic flight in India from Jammu to Srinagar, a Dalmia Jain Airways Douglas C-47B-5-DK Skytrain (registration VT-CDZ) disappears near Banihal Pass with the loss of all 13 people on board.
- January 17 – The British South American Airways Avro Tudor IV Star Ariel (G-AGRE) disappears without trace on a flight from Bermuda to Kingston, Jamaica, with the loss of all 20 people on board.
- January 20 – United States Navy aircraft of Carrier Air Group 8 perform a flyover of President Harry Truman's inauguration ceremony.
- January 30 – Six hijackers take over a China National Aviation Corporation (CNAC) airliner during a domestic flight over China from Shanghai to Qingdao (Tsingtao) and force it to fly them to Tainan on Taiwan.

=== February ===
- El Al purchases its first airliners, two Douglas DC-4s that it buys from American Airlines. Previously, El Al had used only leased airliners.
- February 1 – In the United Kingdom, the Women's Auxiliary Air Force is renamed the Women's Royal Air Force.
- February 3 – A United States Navy Lockheed R6O Constitution sets a new record for the number of people carried on a single nonstop flight across the continental United States, taking 96 people – 74 members of the press, four other passengers, and a crew of 18 – on a 9-hour 35-minute flight from Moffett Field, California, to Washington National Airport in Arlington, Virginia, outside Washington, D.C. The flight also sets a new record for the number of passengers (exclusive of crew members) carried on such a flight.
- February 8
  - A Danish Air Lines Vickers 628 Viking 1B (registration OY-DLU) disappears on approach to Kastrup Airport in Copenhagen, Denmark, with the loss of all 27 people on board. Its wreckage is found a month later on the sea bottom in Swedish waters in the Kattegat off Barsebäck, Sweden, at a depth of 23 meters (75 feet). At the time, it is both the deadliest aviation accident in Swedish history and the deadliest accident involving any model of the Vickers Viking.
  - The United States Air Force′s Boeing XB-47, prototype of the B-47 Stratojet bomber, flies from Moses Lake Air Force Base, Washington, to Andrews Air Force Base, Maryland, in 3 hours 46 minutes at an average speed of 607 mph.
- February 9 – The U.S. Air Force's Northrop YB-49 jet-powered flying wing bomber prototype flies from Muroc Air Force Base, California, to Andrews Air Force Base, Maryland, in 4 hours 25 minutes at an average speed of 511 mph.
- February 10 – A Faucett Perú Douglas C-47B-15-DK Skytrain (registration OB-PAV-223) crashes into a mountain peak on approach to Huánuco Airport in Huánuco, Peru, killing all 16 people on board. It is the deadliest aviation accident in Peruvian history at the time.
- February 19 – A British European Airways Douglas Dakota and a Royal Air Force Avro Anson T21 collide in clear weather over Exhall, England. Both aircraft crash, killing all 10 people on the Dakota and the entire four-man crew of the Anson.
- February 24
  - After the crew of a Cathay Pacific Airways Douglas C-47A-90-DL Skytrain (registration VR-HDG) aborts a landing at Kai Tak Airport in Hong Kong and begins a go-around in poor visibility, the aircraft crashes into a hillside at North Point near Braemar Reservoir, killing all 23 people on board. It is the second-deadliest aviation accident in Hong Kong's history at the time.
  - The left main undercarriage of a TAM Perú Douglas DC-3 collapses during its takeoff roll at Alejandro Velasco Astete Airport in Cusco, Peru, with 26 people aboard. The No. 1 propeller detaches and cuts through the fuselage, badly injuring the captain, and the airliner catches fire after sliding to a halt. The crash and fire kill 22 of the 26 people on board, including the captain, who later dies of his injuries. It is the deadliest aviation accident in Peruvian history at the time, exceeding the death toll in the Faucett Perú crash two weeks earlier.
- February 25
  - The United States Air Force Boeing B-50 Superfortress Global Queen takes off from Carswell Air Force Base near Fort Worth, Texas, and flies eastward to attempt to become the first airplane to make a non-stop flight around the world, but its attempt fails when an engine fire forces it to land at Lajes Field in the Azores.
  - The Douglas Skyrocket makes its first rocket-powered flight.
  - The U.S. Navy Martin JRM-2 Mars flying boat Caroline Mars sets a record for the number of people carried on a single flight, transporting 202 men and a crew of four from Alameda to San Diego, California. It then breaks the record on the return flight the same day, carrying 218 men and a crew of four from San Diego to Alameda.
- February 26 – Replacing Global Queen, the B-50A Superfortress Lucky Lady II of the U.S. Air Force's 43rd Bombardment Group takes off from Carswell Air Force Base and flies eastward to begin an attempt to become the first airplane to circle the world nonstop.

=== March ===
- March 2 – The United States Air Force 43rd Bombardment Group Boeing B-50A Superfortress Lucky Lady II passes the control tower at Carswell Air Force Base near Fort Worth, Texas, becoming the first airplane to circle the world nonstop. Lucky Lady II had taken off from Carswell on February 26 and flown eastward at altitudes between 10,000 and 20,000 feet (3,000 and 6,100 meters), refueling from KB-29M Superfortress tankers four times (over the Azores, the Arabian Peninsula, the Philippines, and Hawaii), and had made the flight in 94 hours 1 minute at an average ground speed of 249 mph (401 km/h; 216 kn), traveling 23,452 miles (37,742 kilometers).
- March 4 – The U.S. Navy Martin JRM-2 Mars flying boat Caroline Mars sets another record for the number of people carried on a single flight, transporting 263 passengers and a crew of six on a 2-hour 41-minute trip from San Diego to Alameda California.
- March 6–8 – Flying the Beechcraft 35 Bonanza Waikiki Beech, William P. "Bill" Odom sets a light-plane nonstop distance record, flying 4,957.24 miles (4,307.72 nmi; 7,977.90 km) from Honolulu, Hawaii, to Teterboro, New Jersey, in 36 hours 1 minute at an average speed of 137.64 mph (221.51 km/h). He wears a business suit for the flight and carries an electric razor with him so that he can arrive at Teterboro cleanshaven.
- March 7 – Aden Airways is founded as a wholly owned subsidiary of the British Overseas Airways Corporation (BOAC). It will begin flight operations in October.
- March 9 – Việt Minh leader Ho Chi Minh orders the organization of an Air Force Research Committee for the Democratic Republic of Vietnam.
- March 10 – Its centre of gravity too far aft for it to remain stable in the air, a Queensland Airlines Lockheed Model 18 Lodestar (registration VH-BAG) stalls immediately after takeoff from Coolangatta Airport in Bilinga, Queensland, Australia, and crashes into a swamp, killing all 21 people on board.
- March 18 – A New Zealand National Airways Lockheed C-60A-5-LO Lodestar (registration ZK-AKX) crashes into a hillside at an elevation of 2,000 feet (610 meters) on approach to Paraparaumu Airport in Paraparaumu, New Zealand, killing all 15 people on board. At the time, it is the deadliest aviation accident in New Zealand's history.
- March 31 – The best single month of the Berlin Airlift concludes, with American aircraft having delivered 154,475 short tons (140,139 metric tons) of cargo to West Berlin since March 1.

=== April ===
- The Fleet Air Arm re-forms No. 702 Squadron at Royal Naval Air Station Culdrose to spearhead the introduction of jet aircraft into Royal Navy service.
- April 1 – Tunisair begins flight operations.
- April 4 – The North Atlantic Treaty Organization (NATO) is formed.
- April 20 – Robert L. Coffey, a member of the United States House of Representatives representing Pennsylvania's 26th Congressional District, dies during United States Air Force Reserve training when his Lockheed F-80A-10-LO Shooting Star crashes on takeoff at Kirtland Air Force Base in Albuquerque, New Mexico, as he begins the second leg of a cross-country proficiency flight across the continental United States.
- April 20–21 – A Royal Air Force Short Sunderland flying boat flies medical personnel and supplies to the Royal Navy sloop HMS Amethyst, which had been shelled by Chinese Communist forces on the Yangtze River.
- April 26 – The first African American naval aviator, Jesse L. Brown, is commissioned as an ensign in the U.S. Navy.
- April 29
  - Flying over 100 kilometers (62 miles) off course during a domestic flight in the Soviet Union from Yakutsk to Kirensk, an Aeroflot Lisunov Li-2 (registration CCCP-L4464) crashes into a mountain 117 kilometers (73 miles) east of Kirensk at an altitude of 1,300 meters (4,300 feet), killing 14 of the 24 people on board.
  - A hijacker commandeers a Transporturi Aeriene Româno-Sovietice (TARS) Douglas DC-3 during a domestic flight over Romania from Timișoara to Bucharest and forces it to fly to Thessaloniki, Greece.

=== May ===
- The United States Marine Corps practices deploying by helicopter for the first time, in Exercise Packard III.
- The Chief of Staff of the United States Air Force, General Hoyt Vandenberg, calls for an American atomic bomb inventory large enough to allow the United States to strike 220 targets.
- The Government of Egypt acquires all capital and aircraft of Misr Airlines, the future EgyptAir, becoming the company's sole stockholder. The airline's name changes to Misrair.
- May 4
  - An Avio Linee Italiane ("Italian Airlines") Fiat G212.CP airliner crashes into the Superga hill near Turin, Italy, killing all 31 people on board. Among the dead are 18 players and club officials of the Torino A.C. – also known as Il Grande Torino – football (soccer) team, journalists accompanying the team, and the plane's crew.
  - The Canadian Blue Devils aerobatic team is formed.
- May 6
  - During a Bristol Aeroplane Company test flight, a Bristol 170 Freighter 31 loses part of one of its wings and crashes into the English Channel off Portland, Dorset, England, killing all seven people on board.
  - Pacific Southwest Airlines begins flight operations. Its first flight is in California from San Diego to Oakland via Burbank, using a leased Douglas DC-3, beginning once-a-week service on the route.
- May 7 – A time bomb planted by two ex-convicts explodes aboard a Philippine Air Lines Douglas C-47B-35-DK Skytrain (registration PI-C98) during a domestic flight in the Philippines from Manila to Daet. The airliner crashes into the Philippine Sea, killing all 13 people on board.
- May 11 – The Royal Air Force's No. 28 Squadron flies from Malaya to Hong Kong to help reinforce the island against Communist forces on mainland China.
- May 12 – A committee to study the effectiveness of American atomic attacks on the Soviet Union appointed by the U.S. Joint Chiefs of Staff and chaired by U.S. Air Force Lieutenant General Hubert R. Harmon reports that if the U.S. Air Force's Strategic Air Command successfully struck 70 Soviet cities with a combined population of 34.7 million people with atomic bombs, the attack would kill 2.7 million people, injure 4 million, and greatly disrupt the lives of the other 28 million residents. However, it also finds that the attacks would not disrupt a Soviet ground and air offensive in Europe, and that Soviet industry damaged by the attacks would recover quickly, while the Soviet population's will to fight would be reinforced by anger over the attacks.
- May 13
  - The first flight of the first British jet bomber occurs, as the English Electric EE.A1 – prototype of the English Electric Canberra and Martin B-57 Canberra – flies for the first time.
  - A Bell 47 sets an altitude record for helicopters, reaching 18,550 feet (5,650 meters).
- May 14 – The Soviet Union cancels the Ilyushin Il-20 program.
- Mid-May – A committee of the U.S. Joint Chiefs of Staff recommends that the American atomic weapon stockpile be expanded to triple the total number of weapons planned previously.
- May 19 – The United States Navy Martin JRM-1 Mars flying boat Marshall Mars sets a new record for the largest number of people to be carried on a single aircraft, taking 308 – 301 passengers and a crew of seven – on a flight from Alameda to San Diego, California.
- May 21 – A Sikorsky S-52 sets a new helicopter altitude record of 21,200 ft (6,500 m).

=== June ===
- June 6
  - During a domestic flight in Greece from Kavala to Athens, a Technical and Aeronautical Exploitations (TAE) Douglas C-47A-1-DK Skytrain loses its right wing in severe turbulence after entering a cumulonimbus cloud. It crashes near Malakasa, killing all 22 people on board.
  - After flying into heavy overcast just after takeoff from Florianópolis Air Force Base in Florianópolis, Brazil, a Brazilian Air Force Douglas C-47B-50-DK Skytrain crashes into Cambirela Peak in the foothills of the Serra da Boa Vista, killing all 28 people on board. It is the deadliest aviation accident in Brazilian history at the time.
- June 7 – After its Number Two engine fails one minute after takeoff from Isla Grande Airport in San Juan, Puerto Rico, an overloaded Strato-Freight Curtiss C-46D-5-CU Commando ditches in the Atlantic Ocean 200 yards (180 meters) off Punta Salinas. The aircraft remains afloat for six minutes, but 53 of the 81 people on board either die in the crash or drown. It is the deadliest aviation accident in Puerto Rican history, and at the time it is the second-deadliest involving any variant of the C-46.
- June 23 – The KLM Lockheed L-749-79-33 Constellation Roermond (registration PH-TER) loses its tail at an altitude of about 4,500 meters (14,800 feet) during a flight from Cairo, Egypt, to Amsterdam in the Netherlands and crashes into the Adriatic Sea just off Bari, Italy, killing all 33 people on board. At the time, it both the deadliest aviation accident in Italian history and the deadliest accident involving the Lockheed L-749.
- June 24 – The Douglas Skyrocket exceeds Mach 1 for the first time.
- June 30 – The United States Air Force signs an agreement with the Douglas Aircraft Company for Douglas to construct two Model 499D supersonic research aircraft under the service designation X-3.

=== July ===
- July 2 – The MacRobertson Miller Aviation Douglas DC-3 airliner Fitzroy, registration VH-MME, crashes on takeoff during a driving rain from Perth, Australia, killing all 18 people on board.
- July 9 – A French Naval Aviation (Aéronavale) Junkers Ju 52 crashes into the Atlantic Ocean off Zaouit Massa, French Morocco, killing all 18 people on board. At the time, it is the deadliest aviation accident in the history of Morocco.
- July 12
  - On approach to Santacruz Airport in Bombay, India, in low clouds and poor visibility, a KLM Lockheed L-749-79-33 Constellation (registration PH-TDF) crashes into a 205-meter (673-foot) hill, killing all 45 people on board. At the time, it is the deadliest aviation accident in Indian history.
  - On approach to Lockheed Air Terminal in Burbank, California, a Standard Air Lines Curtiss C-46E-1-CS Commando (registration N79978) crashes into high ground near Chatsworth, California, at an altitude of 1,890 feet (580 meters), about 430 feet (130 meters) below the crest of Santa Susana Pass. The crash kills 35 of the 48 people on board.
- July 13 – Canadian Pacific Airlines initiates international service with a flight from Vancouver, British Columbia, to Sydney, Australia, with stops at San Francisco, Honolulu, Canton Island (for refueling only), and Nandi (now Nadi) in Fiji. The approximately 4,800-mile (7,700 km) flight in a 36-passenger Canadair Four takes more than 37 hours.
- July 22 – A French Naval Aviation (Aéronavale) Consolidated PBY-5 Catalina amphibious flying boat conducting a nighttime exercise to search for the French Navy submarine Astrée crashes into the Atlantic Ocean off Agadir, French Morocco, and bursts into flames, killing all 17 people on board. It is the second-deadliest aviation accident in Morocco's history at the time.
- July 25 – Squadron Leader Robert Kipp of the Canadian Blue Devils aerobatic team is killed in a training accident.
- July 30 – A United States Navy Grumman F6F-5N Hellcat night fighter performing aerobatics near Chesterfield, New Jersey, collides with Eastern Airlines Flight 557, a Douglas DC-3-201D (registration NC19963) flying from La Guardia Airport in Queens, New York, to Wilmington Airport in Wilmington, Delaware. Both aircraft crash, killing the Hellcat pilot and all 15 people aboard the DC-3.
- July 31 – El Al makes its first international flight, a flight from Tel Aviv to Paris with a refueling stop in Rome.

=== August ===
- August 6 – A Bristol 170 Freighter 21 (registration HC-SBU) operated by Shell of Ecuador crashes at Ecuador's Salasaca Hill. killing all 34 people on board.
- August 7 – Using the probe-and-drogue aerial refueling system, a Royal Air Force Gloster Meteor Mk 3 remains aloft continuously for 12 hours 3 minutes, with pilot comfort appearing to be the only factor limiting an ability to stay aloft even longer.
- August 9
  - United States Navy Lieutenant J. L. Fruin loses control of his F2H-1 Banshee and ejects, becoming the first American pilot to use an ejector seat during an actual in-flight emergency.
  - A Royal Air Force Douglas Dakota C.4 flies into the ground on approach in clouds to Salalah Airport in Salalah, Muscat and Oman, killing all 12 people on board.
- August 10 – The Avro Canada C102 Jetliner makes its first flight. becoming the first jet airliner designed and built in the Western Hemisphere and the second jet airliner worldwide to fly.
- August 13 – During a domestic flight in Colombia from Bogotá to Ibagué, a SAETA Douglas C-47 Skytrain (registration HK-1200) crashes in the Andes near Bojacá, killing all 32 people on board.
- August 15
  - A de Havilland Tiger Moth makes the first service flight by an aircraft of the Democratic Republic of Vietnam.
  - A Transocean Air Lines Douglas C-54A-DO Skymaster (registration N79998) flying from Rome, Italy, to Shannon, Ireland, with 58 people on board flies well out over the North Atlantic Ocean when its crew fails to realize that they have already passed Shannon. Upon realizing their mistake, the crew attempts to fly back toward Shannon, but the aircraft runs out of fuel and ditches off Ireland's Lurga Point. The aircraft remains afloat for 15 minutes and all passengers and crew escape, but seven passengers and one crew member drown or die of exposure before the British fishing trawler Stalberg rescues the survivors from life rafts.
- August 19 – The British European Airways Douglas DC-3 G-AHCY crashes into a hill at Oldham, Lancashire, England, killing 24 of the 32 people on board.
- August 21 – Flying in poor weather, a Royal Canadian Air Force Canadian Vickers PBV-1A Canso A amphibious flying boat strikes trees on upsloping terrain near Bigstone Lake in Manitoba, Canada, and crashes, killing all 21 people on board.
- August 23 – BOAC commences its first services to East Asia to be flown entirely by landplanes.
- August 24 – The flag carrier of the Socialist Federal Republic of Yugoslavia, JAT Jugoslovenski Aerotransport, inaugurates international service between Belgrade, Yugoslavia, and Zürich, Switzerland. Previously, Yugoslavia's isolation from both the Western world and the Eastern Bloc had forced the airline to survive on just six routes, all domestic.

=== September ===
- Pan American Airways acquires an ownership stake in and management contract with Middle East Airlines.
- September 5 – While he is participating in the Thompson Trophy race on the final day of the National Air Races at Cleveland, Ohio, record-breaking pilot William P. "Bill" Odom dies when his P-51C Mustang Beguine crashes into a house in Berea, Ohio, setting the house on fire. The crash also kills a woman and her 13-month-old son in the house, the first time that non-participants have died during the National Air Races. Outrage over the accident results in new ordinances that make it impossible to hold the National Air Races in the Cleveland area again, and military participation in the races ends. The National Air Races do not resume until 1964, when they move to Reno, Nevada.
- September 9 – In order to kill his wife Rita, Albert Guay conspires with Généreux Ruest and Marguerite Pitre to plant a dynamite bomb in Rita Guay's luggage aboard Canadian Pacific Air Lines Flight 108, a Douglas DC-3. The bomb explodes in mid-flight over Cap Tourmente near Sault-au-Cochon, Quebec, Canada, en route from Quebec City to Baie-Comeau, Quebec, killing Rita Guay and all of the other 22 people on board. Between 1951 and 1953, Albert Guay, Ruest, and Pitre all will be hanged for the crime, the worst mass murder in Canadian history at the time.
- September 15 – Central Airlines commences scheduled revenue flights.
- September 16 – Five Polish hijackers, four with loaded guns and one with a toy pistol, force a LOT Polish Airlines Lisunov Li-2 making a domestic flight over Poland from Gdańsk to Łódź to fly to Nyköping-F11 Air Force Base in Nyköping, Sweden.
- September 17 – The Shuttleworth Collection's Blackburn Type D monoplane of 1912 makes its first flight after restoration, the oldest airworthy British aircraft.
- September 26 – During a domestic flight in Mexico from Oaxaca to Mexico City, a Mexicana Douglas DC-3A (registration XA-DUH) crashes into the stratovolcano Popocatepetl, killing all 24 people on board.
- September 27 – Returning from a humanitarian mission to aid victims of a recent major earthquake in Ecuador, a Flota Aérea Mercante Argentina (FAMA) Douglas C-54A-1-DO Skymaster (registration LV-ABI) catches fire in flight and crashes near Buenos Aires, Argentina, killing five of the 27 people on board.
- September 30 – The Berlin Airlift officially ends, with 2,325 tons (2,362 tonnes) of food and supplies having been flown into the city. The final flight is made a week later.

=== October ===
- Aerocar International completes the prototype of its first flying automobile, the Aerocar I.
- October 1
  - Aden Airways, a wholly owned subsidiary of the British Overseas Airways Corporation (BOAC), begins flight operations, using a fleet of six Douglas DC-3 airliners transferred from BOAC.
  - A Cessna T-50 runs out of fuel and crashes on Beverly Boulevard in Los Angeles. Four of the men on board survive, but the fifth, American singer Buddy Clark, dies when he is thrown from the plane.
- October 10 – During a domestic flight in Mexico from Mexico City to Piedras Negras, an Aerovías Coahuila Douglas DC-3-277B (registration XA-HOU) crashes into Sierra de Ovallos near Saltillo, killing all eight people on board.
- October 26 – Costa Rica creates the Dirección General de Aviación Civil ("General Directorate of Civil Aviation"), its national civil aviation authority.
- October 28 – Air France Flight 009, off course and with its crew believing that they are on approach to Santa Maria Airport in Vila do Porto on Santa Maria Island in the Azores, an Air France Lockheed L-749-79-46 Constellation (registration F-BAZN) flying from Paris Orly Airport to New York crashes into Pico da Vara on São Miguel Island at an elevation of 900 meters (3,000 feet), killing all 48 people on board. French boxing star Marcel Cerdan and French concert violinist Ginette Neveu are among the dead. At the time, it is the deadliest aviation accident in the history of Portugal.

=== November ===
- The New Tachikawa Aircraft Company is formed in Japan.
- November 1 – Eastern Air Lines Flight 537, a Douglas C-54B-10-DO, en route from Boston, Massachusetts to Washington, D.C. collides with a Lockheed P-38 Lightning fighter on its final approach to National Airport. Both planes crash, killing all 55 people on board the Douglas. The P-38 pilot, Eric Rios Bridaux (a Bolivian Air Force pilot), survives. Among the dead are U.S. Congressman George J. Bates, former U.S. Congressman Michael J. Kennedy, and American cartoonist Helen E. Hokinson.
- November 2 – The People's Republic of China establishes the General Administration of Civil Aviation of China – forerunner of the Civil Aviation Administration of China – as its national civil aviation authority. Initially, the People's Liberation Army Air Force manages it.
- November 16 – Chief of Staff of the United States Air Force General Hoyt Vandenberg notes that in a few years the Soviet Union will have 50 to 60 atomic bombs and be able to devastate the United States. He recommends improvements in American air defense capabilities.
- November 18 – A Douglas C-74 Globemaster carries 103 passengers and crew over the North Atlantic Ocean, the largest number to have made the crossing in a single flight.
- November 20 – The Aero Holland Douglas DC-3 PH-TFA crashes at Hurum, Norway, while on approach to Fornebu Airport outside Oslo, killing 34 of the 35 people on board. Of the 26 Jewish children aboard on their way to Israel, only one, a 12-year-old boy, survives.
- November 26 – During a domestic flight in Colombia from Bucaramanga to Cúcuta, a Limitada Nacional de Servicio Aéreo (LANSA) Douglas C-47 Skytrain (registration HK-305) crashes in mountainous terrain at an altitude of approximately 2,000 feet (610 meters) near Páramo Bogueche, killing all 12 people on board.
- November 27 – An Aigle Azur Douglas C-47B-5DK Skytrain (registration F-OABJ) crashes in flames near Đông Khê in French Indochina, killing 10 people on board. It is not clear whether it experienced a technical malfunction or was shot down by the Việt Minh.
- November 28 – On approach to Lyon-Bron Airport in Lyon, France, an Air France Douglas C-54A-15-DC Skymaster (registration F-BELO) strikes a tree and crashes, sliding to a halt in an open field and catching fire. Five of the 38 people on board die.
- November 29 – American Airlines Flight 157, a Douglas DC-6, strikes buildings at Dallas Love Field after the flight crew loses directional control on landing; 28 of the 46 people on board die and 16 of the 18 survivors are injured.

=== December ===
- The Royal Navy's Fleet Air Arm takes delivery of its first British-built helicopter, a Westland Dragonfly.
- Monarch Airlines buys a controlling interest in Challenger Airlines.
- December 1 – Flying in bad weather on a domestic flight in Brazil from São Paulo to Jacarezinho, a Real Transportes Aéreos Douglas C-47-DL Skytrain (registration PP-YPM) crashes into a mountain near Ribeirão Claro, killing 20 of the 22 people on board.
- December 7 – During a flight in California from Oakland to Sacramento, a California Arrow Airlines Douglas C-47A-1-DL Skytrain (registration NC60256) crashes into a hill east of Vallejo at an altitude of 782 feet (238 meters) much lower than the planned altitude of 4,000 feet (1,200 meters), killing all nine people on board, including three children. The dead include the wife and small child of the airline owner.
- December 8 – Muroc Army Airfield is renamed Edwards Air Force Base in honor of test pilot Glen Edwards.
- December 9
  - A Civil Air Transport Curtiss C-46D-20-CU Commando (registration XT-820) crashes near Lanzhou, China, killing all 38 people on board.
  - Four hijackers aboard a TARS Douglas DC-3 making a domestic flight over Romania from Sibiu to Budapest carrying 20 passengers and five crew kill the on-board air marshal and force the flight crew to fly to Beograd in the Socialist Federal Republic of Yugoslavia.
- December 10 – A Civil Air Transport Curtiss C-46D-20-CU Commando (registration XT-820) crashes at Haikou, China, during a flight to Haikou Airport, killing 17 of the 40 people on board.
- December 12
  - After its crew makes a navigational error and begins a descent toward Karachi Airport in Karachi, Pakistan, too soon, a Pakair Douglas C-53 Skytrooper (registration AP-ADI) crashes into Karo Jabal Mountain near Jungshahi, Pakistan, at an altitude of about 1,185 feet (361 meters), killing 22 of the 26 people on board.
  - Capital Airlines Flight 500, a Douglas DC-3-313A (registration NC25691), stalls on approach to Washington National Airport in Arlington, Virginia, and crashes into the Potomac River, killing six of the 23 people on board.
- December 16
  - Sixteen hijackers commandeer a LOT Polish Airlines airliner making a domestic flight over Poland from Łódź to Gdańsk with 18 people aboard and force it to fly to Bornholm Airport on Bornholm in Denmark.
  - During a domestic flight in Mexico from Mexico City to Mérida, a Mexicana Douglas DC-3A (registration XA-DUK) crashes into the mountain Cerro del Borrego near Orizaba, killing all 17 people on board.
- December 18 – A Sabena Douglas C-47 Skytrain (registration OO-AUQ) crashes near Aulnay-sous-Bois, France, when its wing malfunctions just after departure from Paris – Le Bourget Airport. The crash kills all eight people on board.
- December 30 – Local villagers gather around a Bharat Airways Douglas C-54A-DO Skymaster (registration VT-CYK) after it makes a forced landing at Comilla, East Pakistan. All three people on board survive, but seven villagers are killed when the aircraft catches fire and its fuel tanks explode.
- December 31 – The U.S. Air Force's Strategic Air Command has 837 aircraft, of which 521 are capable of delivering atomic bombs.

== First flights ==
- Beriev Be-6 (NATO reporting name "Madge")
- Piper PA-20 Pacer
- Late 1949 – Aerocar Aerocar

=== January ===
- January 6 – Nord Noroit
- January 8 – Morane-Saulnier MS-700 Pétrel
- January 28 – SNCAC NC.271

=== February ===
- February 1 – CAB Minicab
- February 15 – Breguet 761
- February 24 – Eklund TE-1
- February 28 – Dassault Ouragan

=== March ===
- March 1 – Bréguet 892S Mercure
- March 7 – Sud-Ouest SO 1100 Ariel I
- March 9 – Avro Shackleton prototype VW126
- March 28 – SNCAC NC.860

=== April ===
- April 1 – SNCASO SO.8000 Narval
- April 2 – SNCASE Armagnac
- April 3 – Boisavia Mercurey
- April 10 – Armstrong Whitworth Apollo
- April 14 – Aero Ae 50
- April 14 – Helio Courier (by its "Helioplane No.1" demonstrator in Canton, Massachusetts)
- April 16 – Lockheed YF-94, prototype of the F-94 Starfire
- April 21 – Leduc 0.10 – powered flight

=== May ===
- May 9 – Republic XF-91 Thunderceptor
- May 13 – English Electric EE.A1 VN799, prototype of the English Electric Canberra, the first British jet bomber
- May 21 – Bréguet G.111

=== June ===
- June 4 – Lockheed XF-90
- June 4 – Fouga CM.8

=== July ===
- July 13 – Found FBA-1
- July 17 – Vickers Varsity
- July 27 – De Havilland Comet, the world's first jet-propelled airliner, at Hatfield, Hertfordshire in the United Kingdom
- July 29 – SNCAC NC 1080

=== August ===
- August 1 – Northrop N-32 Raider, prototype of the Northrop C-125 Raider
- August 10 – Avro Canada C102 Jetliner
- August 11 – Morane-Saulnier Alcyon

=== September ===
- September 1 – Avro Ashton
- September 2 – De Havilland Venom
- September 4
  - Avro 707
  - Bristol Brabazon
- September 10 – Nord Noratlas
- September 19 – Fairey Gannet
- September 20 – Blackburn B-54
- September 22 – Convair XAT-29, prototype of the Convair T-29
- September 24 – North American XT-28, prototype of the T-28 Trojan

=== October ===
- October 14 – Fairchild C-123 Provider
- October 28
  - Martin XB-51
  - Millet Lagarde ML-10

=== November ===
- November 7 – Sikorsky S-55
- November 10 – Piasecki HRP-2 Rescuer, improved version of HRP helicopter which also will serve as H-21 Shawnee and H-21 Workhorse
- November 27 – C-124 Globemaster II

=== December ===
- December 14 – Cessna 305, prototype of the Cessna O-1 Bird Dog
- December 16 – Rey R.1
- December 16 – Nord 2200
- December 22 – North American F-95A, prototype of the F-86D Sabre, also known as the "Sabre Dog", "Dog Sabre", and "Dogship"

== Entered service ==
=== February ===
- February 2 – Lockheed R6O Constitution (later R6V Constitution) with United States Navy Transport Squadron 44 (VR-44)

=== March ===
- Vought F6U Pirate with the United States Navy

=== April ===
- April 1 – Boeing Stratocruiser with Pan American World Airways

=== May ===
- F9F Panther with United States Navy Fighter Squadron 51 (VF-51)

=== October ===
- Avro Athena with Royal Air Force Central Flying School

=== December ===
- Fairchild C-119 Flying Boxcar
- December 29 – Lockheed F-94 Starfire with the United States Air Force

== Retirements ==
- Dewoitine D.338 by Air France
- Saro A.37 Shrimp
- December 23 – Martin Baltimore by the United States Navy
