= Serra da Boa Vista =

Serra da Boa Vista may refer to:

- Serra da Boa Vista, located in the state of Ceará.
- Serra da Boa Vista, located in the state of Minas Gerais.
