= Cessna AT-17 Bobcat =

American WWII twin-engine advanced trainer aircraft

AT-17/UC-78 Bobcat Crane Model T-50
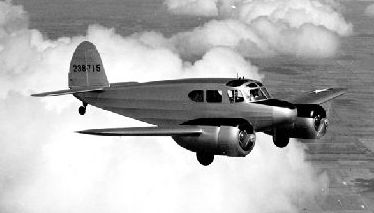

General information
- Type: Trainer, five-seat light transport and utility aircraft
- Manufacturer: Cessna Aircraft Company
- Status: Retired, some examples in private use
- Primary users: United States Army Air Forces Royal Canadian Air Force; United States Navy
- Number built: 5,422

History
- Manufactured: 1939-1944
- First flight: 26 March 1939 (T-50)

The Cessna AT-17 Bobcat or Cessna Crane is a twin-engine advanced trainer aircraft designed and produced by the American aviation firm Cessna Aircraft Company. It was known by several different designations, including as the AT-8 trainer, UC-78 transport and bomber, and the Crane Mk.I in Royal Canadian Air Force (RCAF) service.

Originally developed as the Model T-50 as a commercial aircraft during the late 1930s, it drew upon the structural and aerodynamic design of the preceding Cessna Airmaster. The airframe was made of tubular steel while a mixture of plywood and spruce was used for both the wings and tail surfaces. It was equipped with electrically actuated retractable main landing gear and trailing edge flaps; power was typically provided by a pair of Jacobs L-4MB radial engines that drove a Hamilton Standard 2B-20-213 hydraulically-actuated, constant-speed, non-featherable propellers.

The prototype performed its maiden flight in March 1939 and was type certified in March 1940. That same year, the AT-8 was ordered as a trainer aircraft for the United States Army Air Corps (USAAC). Numerous other militarised models of the aircraft would be procured, particularly in the aftermath of the US's entry into World War II, which was operated by the United States Army Air Forces (USAAF) amongst others during to bridge the gap between single-engine trainers and larger multi-engine combat aircraft. After the conflict, surplus AT-17s and UC-78s were commonly converted for further use within the civil sector. Both the Civil Aeronautics Administration and Pan American Airways procured the type. Civilian T-50s have continued to be flown into the twenty-first century.

== Design and development ==
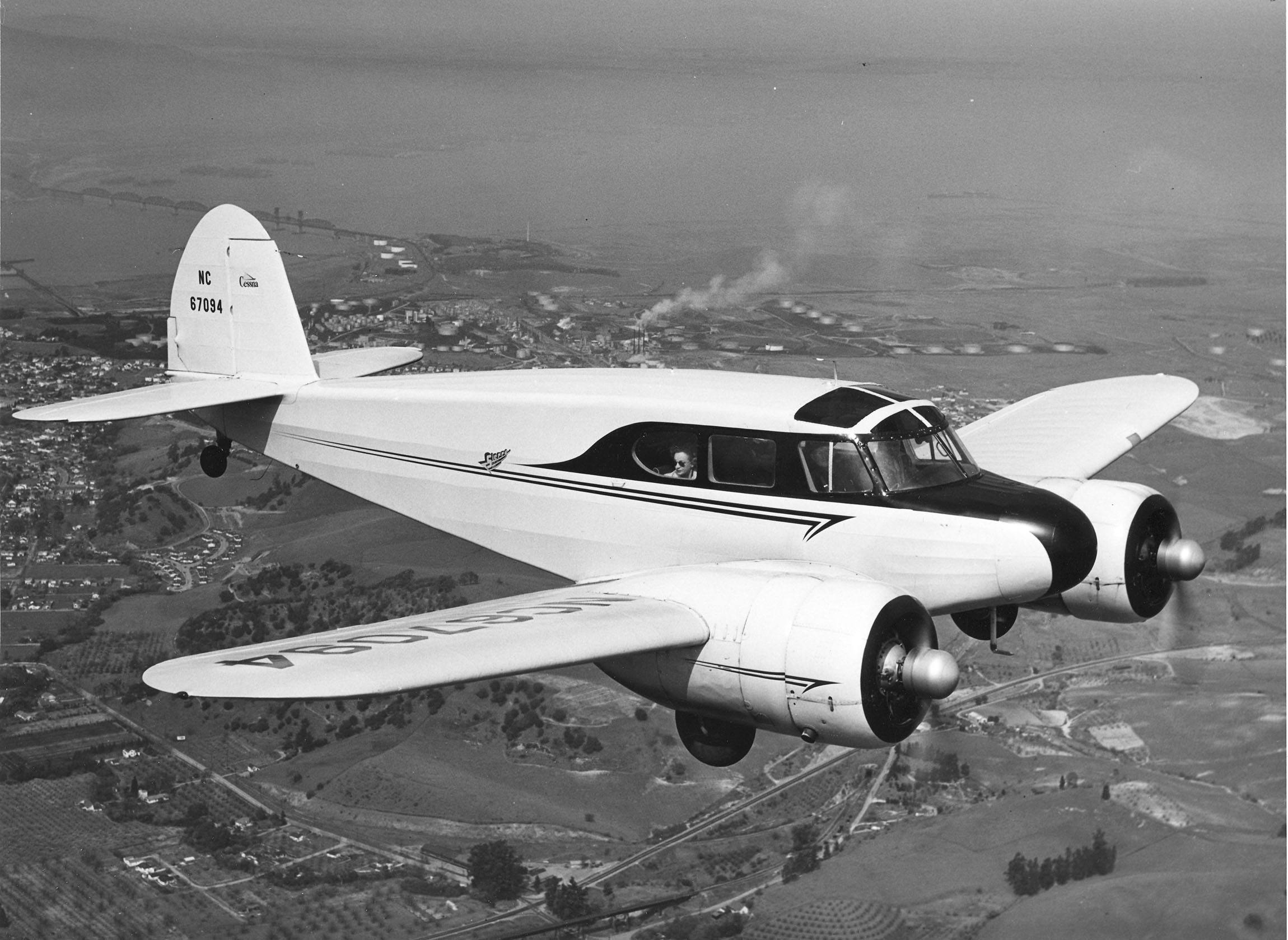
T-50 in flight

The Cessna Airplane Company started work on what would become the AT-17 in the late 1930s as the T-50 for the civilian market. It was designed to be a less expensive alternative to competing aircraft, such as the Beechcraft Model 18 and the Lockheed Model 12 Electra Junior.

In terms of its general configuration, the aircraft was a low-wing cantilever monoplane, furnished with retractable main landing gear and trailing edge flaps, both of which were electrically actuated via chain-driven screws. The retracted main landing gear left some of the wheels extended below the engine nacelle for emergency wheel-up landings. Its airframe was composed of tubular steel while the wings and tail surfaces were made of wood; both were fabric-covered. This wing structure was built around laminated spruce spar beams, truss-style spruce and plywood ribs, and plywood wing leading edges and wing tips. Both the structural and aerodynamic design had been derived from the preceding Cessna Airmaster. The fixed tailwheel is not steerable, but can be locked straight.

While originally equipped with Curtiss Reed metal fixed-pitch propellers, these were soon replaced with Hamilton Standard 2B-20-213 hydraulically-actuated, constant-speed, non-featherable propellers. Power was provided by a pair of 225 hp (168 kW) Jacobs L-4MB radial engines, which were rated at 245 hp (183 kW) for takeoff. Operationally, these engines proved to be easy to maintain.

On 26 March 1939, three years after Clyde Cessna retired, the prototype T-50 made its maiden flight, becoming the company's first twin-engine airplane, as well as its first to be equipped with a retractable undercarriage. Quantity production commenced in December 1939. Cessna received Approved Type Certificate 722 for the type, clearing it to enter service, on 24 March 1940. It quickly proved to be a modest success on the civil market.

The AT-8, AT-17, C-78, UC-78, and Crane were military versions of the commercial T-50 aircraft.

== Operational history ==
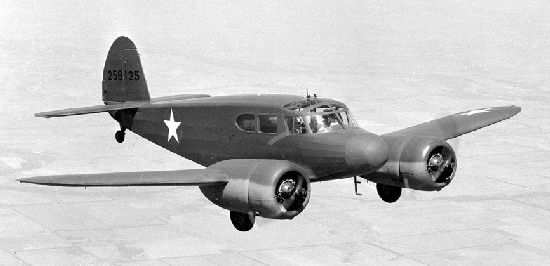
UC-78 in flight

=== US military ===
By 1940, the US government was in the process of substantially expanding its armed forces in response to the increasingly likelihood that the country would be directly involved in World War II. In line with this wider programme, the United States Army Air Corps (USAAC) foresaw a need to expand its ability to train pilots for its combat aircraft and recognising that its traditional apporach of using obsolte bombers for training bomber crews, quickly explored the use of other aircraft for this mission. This effort would lead to both the T-50 and the AT-9 Jeep being procured with considerable haste.

On 19 July 1940, United States Assistant Secretary of War Louis A. Johnson ordered 33 AT-8 trainers, based on the T-50, for the United States Army Air Corps (USAAC). Modifications included cockpit roof windows, more powerful 290 hp (220 kW) Lycoming R-680 engines and military radios. The first AT-8 was delivered to the USAAC in December 1940, and in late 1941, the United States Army ordered an additional 450 AT-17s, based on the T-50. Modifications included additional cockpit windows and the adoption of Jacobs R-755-9 engines, capable of producing up to 245 hp (183 kW). Production for the USAAC continued under the designation AT-17 reflecting a change in equipment and engine types. In 1942, the United States Army Air Force (the successor to the Air Corps from June 1941) ordered the Bobcat as a light transport as C-78s, which were redesignated as UC-78s on 1 January 1943.

By the end of World War II, Cessna had produced more than 4,600 Bobcats for the U.S. Army, 67 of which were transferred to the United States Navy (USN) as JRC-1s. The USN used the aircraft primarily for shuttling crews of ferry flights to and from their home bases. The Bobcat was given the nickname "Bamboo Bomber" in US service. Several Bobcats were still in service with the United States Air Force when it was formed in September 1947, and the type was declared obsolete in 1949.

=== Royal Canadian Air Force ===
In September 1940, the Royal Canadian Air Force (RCAF) ordered 180 Crane Mk.I trainers, Cessna's largest order to date. Modifications for the RCAF included Hartzell fixed-pitch wooden propellers, removable cylinder head baffles, and oil heaters. The first Crane Mk.I was delivered to the RCAF in November 1940, and Cessna then received an additional order from the RCAF for 460 more Crane Mk.Is. An additional 182 AT-17A were received by the RCAF through lend-lease, operated under the designation Crane Mk.IA, bringing the total produced for the RCAF to 822 aircraft, which were operated under the British Commonwealth Air Training Plan (BCATP).

=== Other operators ===
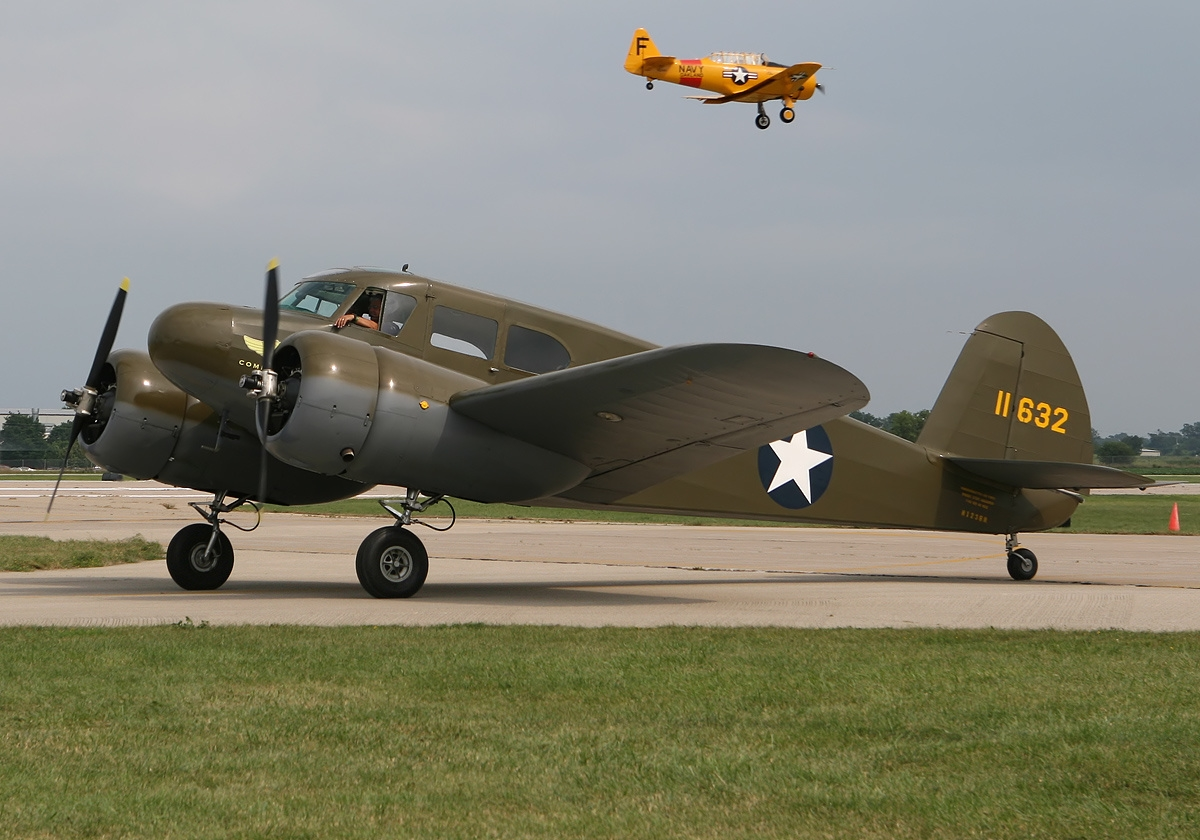
Cessna T-50 Bobcat at EAA AirVenture 2008

In addition to military orders, the Civil Aeronautics Administration (CAA, precursor to the FAA) ordered 13 T-50s, and Pan American Airways ordered 14 T-50s. Aircraft operated by the US military and by the RCAF were retired shortly after the end of the conflict, while many aircraft were exported worldwide, including to Brazil and the Nationalist Chinese.

After the conflict, surplus AT-17s and UC-78s could be converted with CAA-approved kits to civilian-standard aircraft allowing their certification under the original T-50 approved type certificate. They were frequently used by small airlines, charter and bush operators, and private pilots. Some were operated on floats. By the 1970s, the number of airworthy aircraft had dwindled as they were made obsolete by more modern types and by the maintenance required by their aging wood wing structures and fabric covering. Since then, several have been restored by antique airplane enthusiasts.

By December 2017, 52 T-50s, two AT-17s, and five UC-78s were still listed on the Federal Aviation Administration's (FAA) registration database. In the 2020s, a single flightworthy T-50 was operating in Europe.

=== Notable appearances in media ===
It was featured in the popular television series Sky King of the early-to-mid 1950s. The aircraft was replaced in later episodes by the T-50's successor, the all-metal Cessna 310. One also stood in for Japanese twin engine bombers in the low level attack scene on the US PT boat base in the 1963 film, PT-109.

== Variants ==
=== Company designations ===
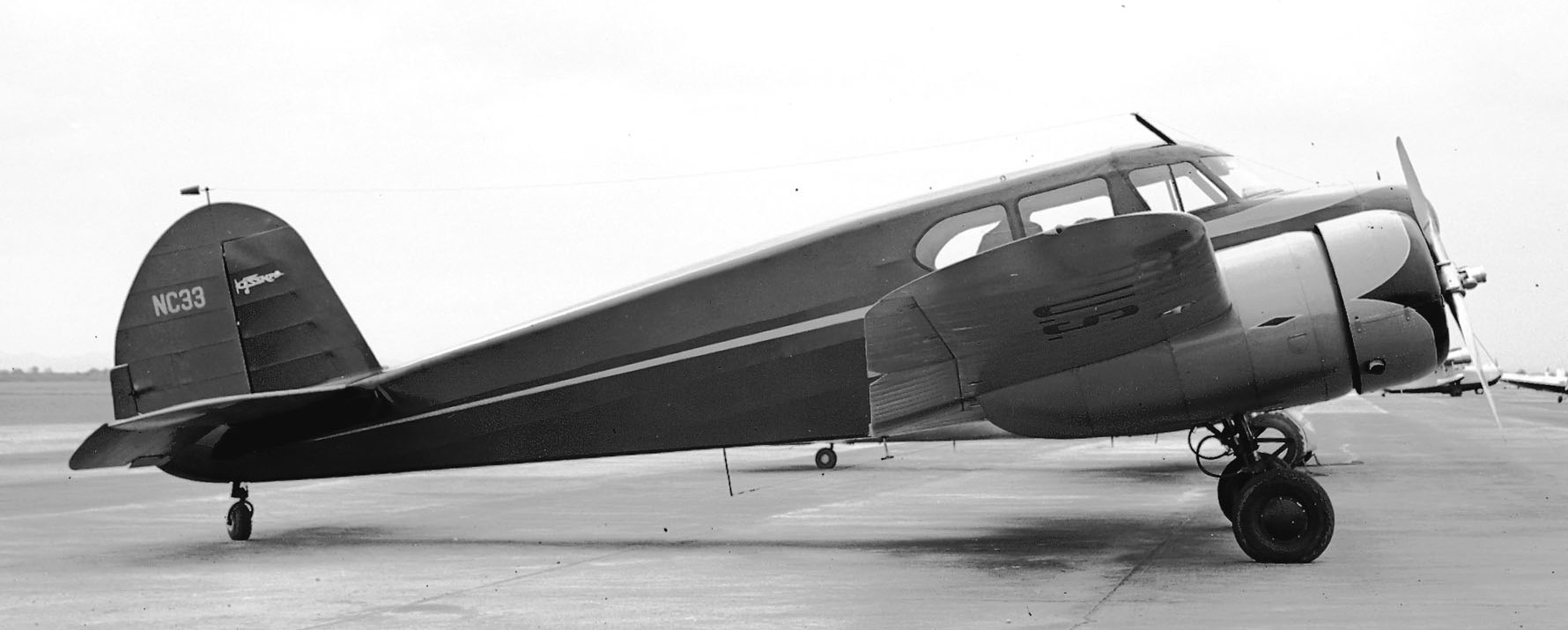
CAA (FAA precursor) Cessna T-50

T-50
Fitted with Jacobs L-4MB radial piston engines.
P-7
Experimental T-50 with more powerful 300 hp (220 kW) Jacobs L-6MB engines, and plywood covered tailplane and wings, one built, first flown on 2 June 1941.
P-10
1941 advanced bomber trainer with modified fuselage, sliding canopy and 330 hp (250 kW) Jacobs engines, one built.

=== USAAC/USAAF designations ===
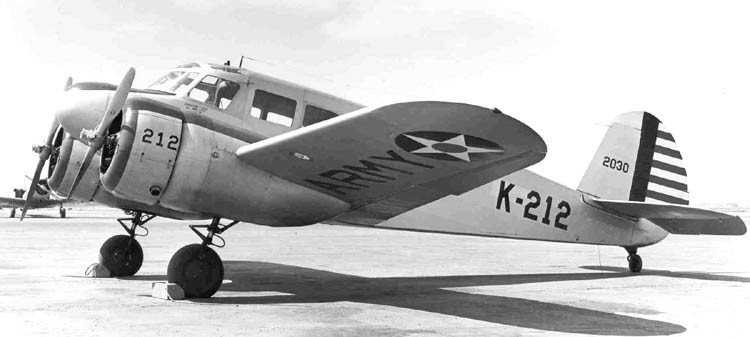
Cessna AT-17 trainer

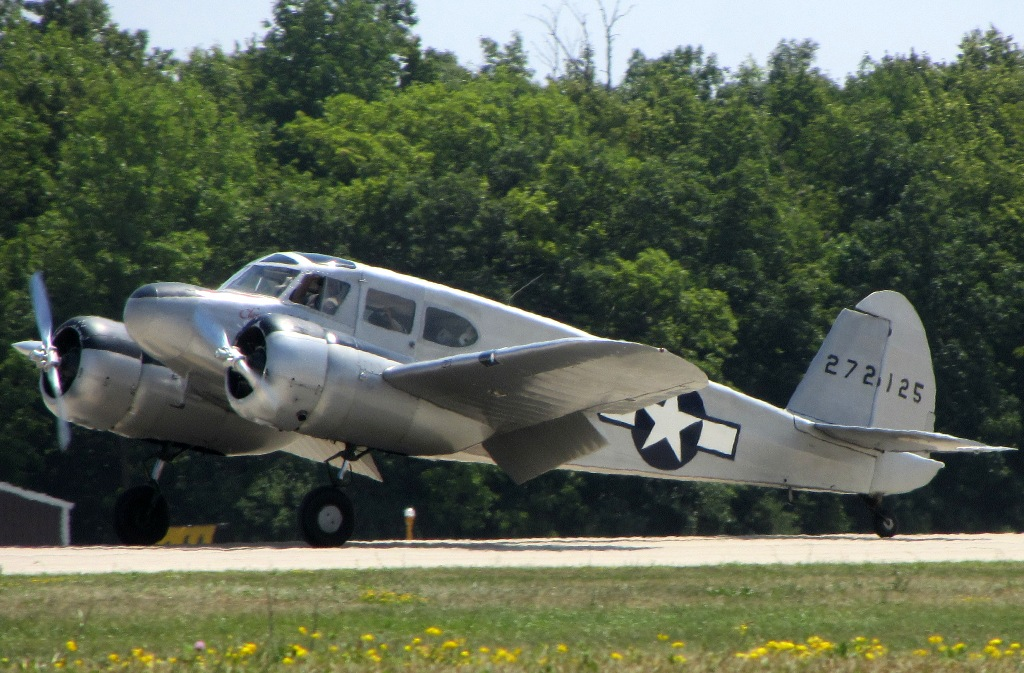
Restored UC-78C

AT-8
Military advanced trainer with two 295 hp (220 kW) Lycoming R-680-9 radial piston engines, 33 built.
AT-17
As per AT-8 but powered by 245 hp (183 kW) Jacobs R-755-9 (L-4) engines, 450 built, some later converted to AT-17E.
AT-17A
As per AT-17 but with metal propellers and reduced weight, 223 built. 182 to Canada as Crane Mk.IAs and later conversions to AT-17Fs.
AT-17B
As per AT-17A but with equipment changes, wooden propellers and reduced weight, 466 built. Subsequent aircraft were built as UC-78Bs.
AT-17C
As per AT-17A but different radio equipment, 60 built.
AT-17D
As per AT-17C with equipment changes, 131 built.
AT-17E
AT-17 with gross weight limited to 5,300 lb (2,400 kg).
AT-17F
AT-17A with gross weight limited to 5,300 lb (2,400 kg).
AT-17G
AT-17B with gross weight limited to 5,300 lb (2,400 kg).
C-78
Transport with variable-pitch propellers, became UC-78 in 1943, 1,354 aircraft built.
UC-78
C-78 redesignated in 1943
UC-78A
17 civilian T-50s that were impressed.
UC-78B
AT-17B redesignated, 1806 built.

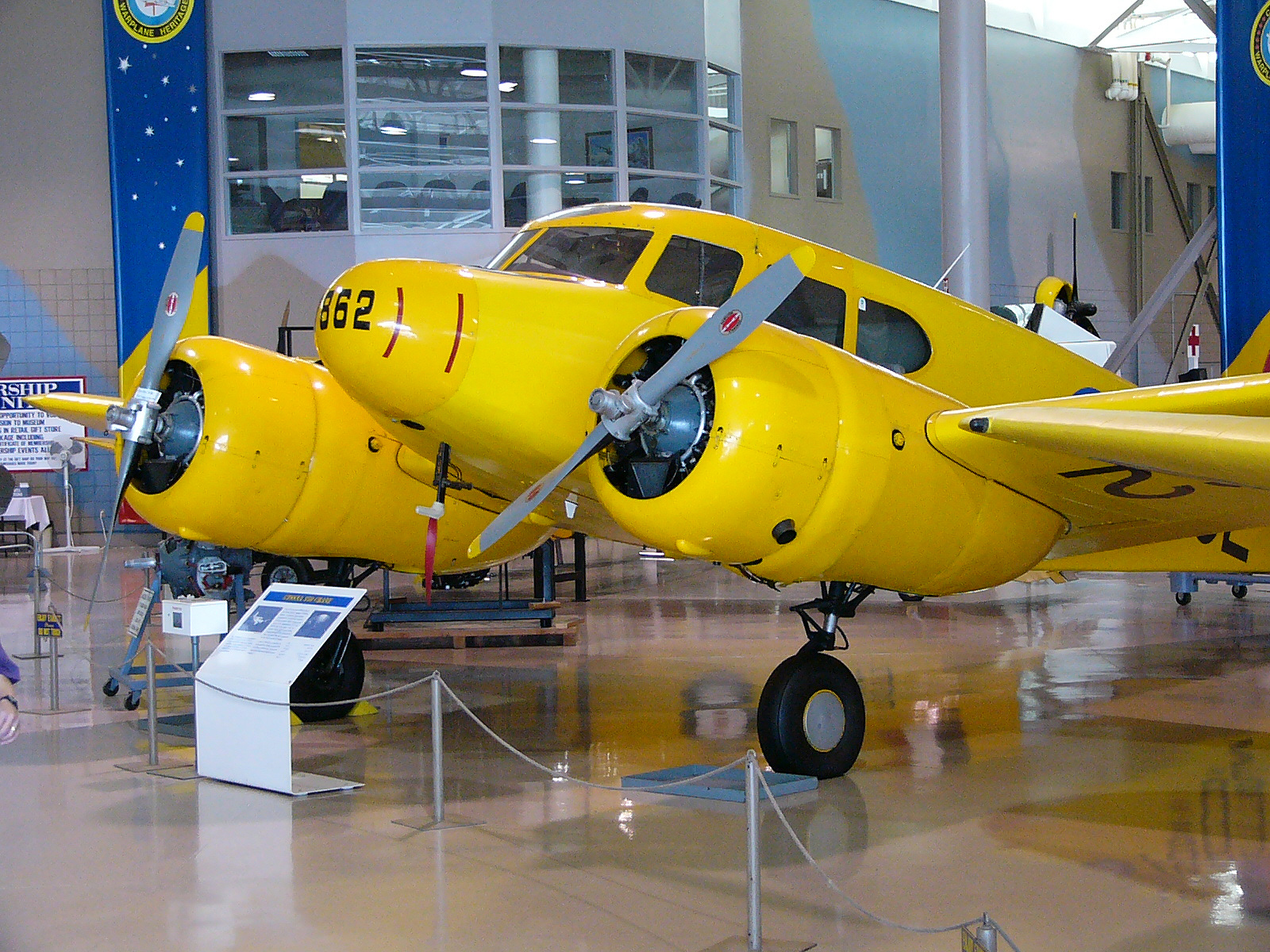
Royal Canadian Air Force (RCAF) Cessna Crane as used in the British Commonwealth Air Training Plan (BCATP) at the Canadian Warplane Heritage Museum

UC-78C
AT-17D redesignated, 131 AT-17Ds redesignated and 196 built.

=== US Navy designation ===
JRC-1
Navy light transport version of the UC-78 with two Jacobs -9 engines, 67 delivered.

=== RCAF designations ===
Crane Mk.I
640 T-50s with minor equipment changes.
Crane Mk.IA
182 AT-17As delivered to RCAF under lend-lease.

== Operators ==
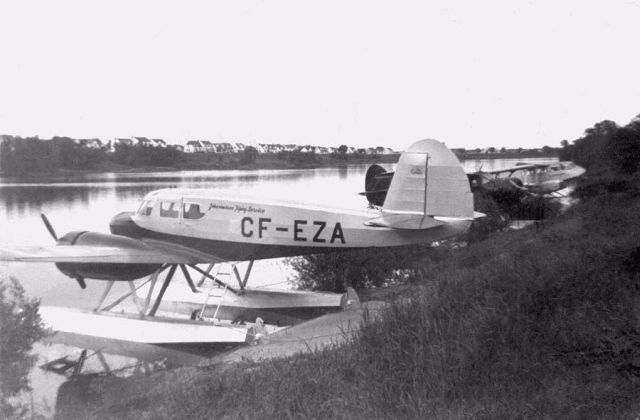
Cessna Crane mounted on floats for use as bushplane in Canada

Brazil

- Brazilian Air Force (operated 39 from 1943 to 1956)

Canada

- Royal Canadian Air Force (operated 822 from 1941 to 1949)
  - No. 3 Service Flying Training School RCAF (SFTS) — Calgary, Alberta
  - No. 4 SFTS — RCAF Station Saskatoon
  - No. 10 SFTS — RCAF Station Dauphin
  - No. 11 SFTS — RCAF Station Yorkton
  - No. 12 SFTS — RCAF Station Brandon
  - No. 15 SFTS — RCAF Station Claresholm
  - No. 1 Flying Instructor School — RCAF Station Trenton
  - No. 2 Flying Instructor School — RCAF Station Vulcan/RCAF Station Pearce
  - No. 3 Flying Instructor School — RCAF Station Arnprior
  - Central Flying School — RCAF Station Trenton
- Queen Charlotte Airlines

Costa Rica

- Air Force of Costa Rica (operated one in 1948)

Ethiopia

- Ethiopian Air Force (operated two from 1946 to 1965)

France

- French Air Force and French Navy (operated eight from 1943 to 1951)

Guatemala

- Guatemalan Air Force (received one in 1949)

Haiti

- Haiti Air Corps (operated four from 1943 to 1995)

Nicaragua

- Nicaraguan Air Force (received two in 1947)

North Yemen

- Yemeni Air Force (operated three from 1950 to 1958)

Republic of China

- Republic of China Air Force (operated 15 from 1946 to 1950)

Peru

- Peruvian Air Force (operated nine from 1945 to 1958)

Poland

- LOT Polish Airlines (operated 14 in 1946-1950)

United States

- Civil Aeronautics Authority
- United States Army Air Corps/United States Army Air Forces
- United States Navy
- Northern Consolidated Airlines
- Wiggins Airways
- Wisconsin Central Airlines
- Friedkin Airlines

== Surviving aircraft ==
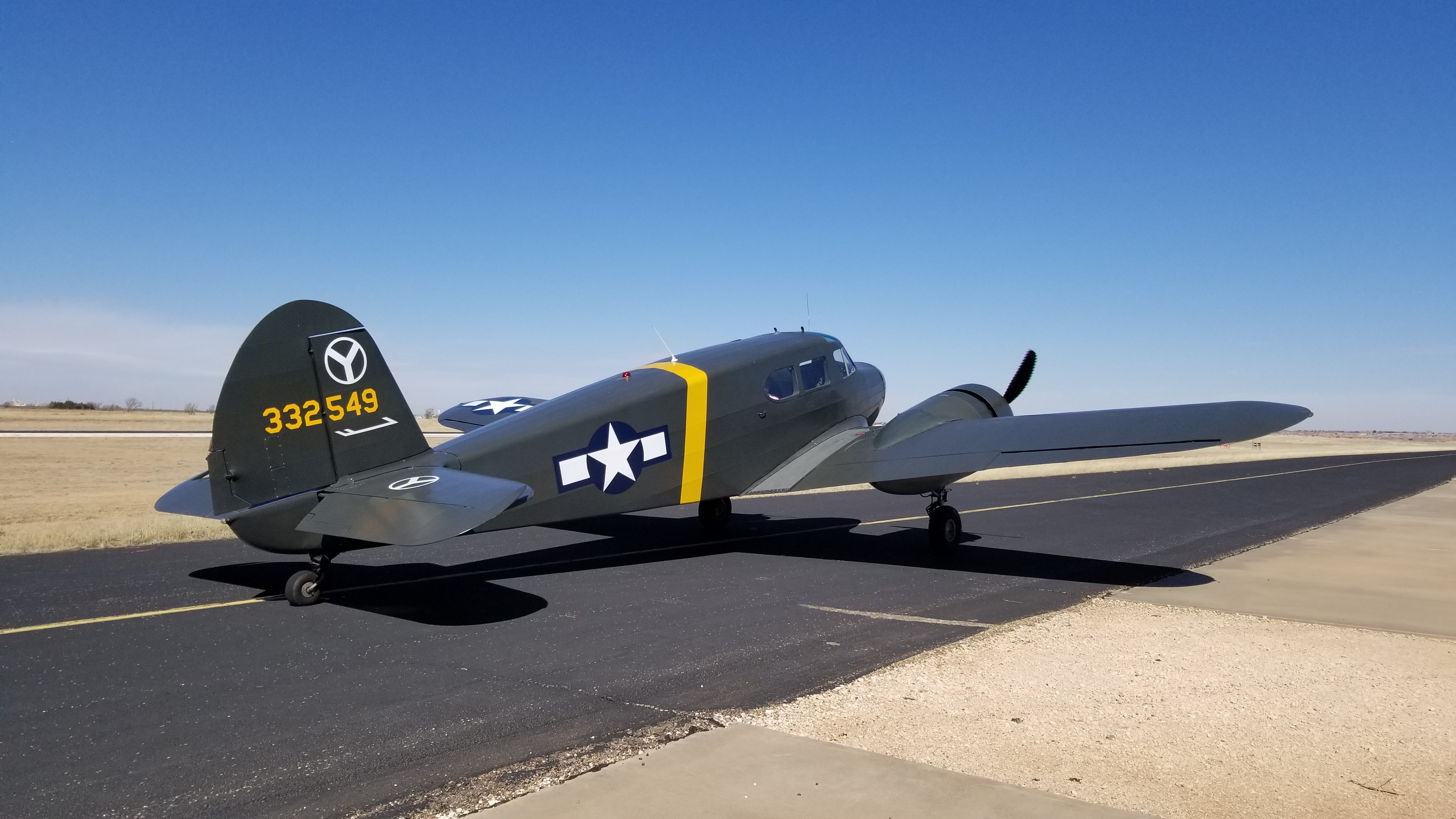
UC-78 of the National WASP WWII Museum

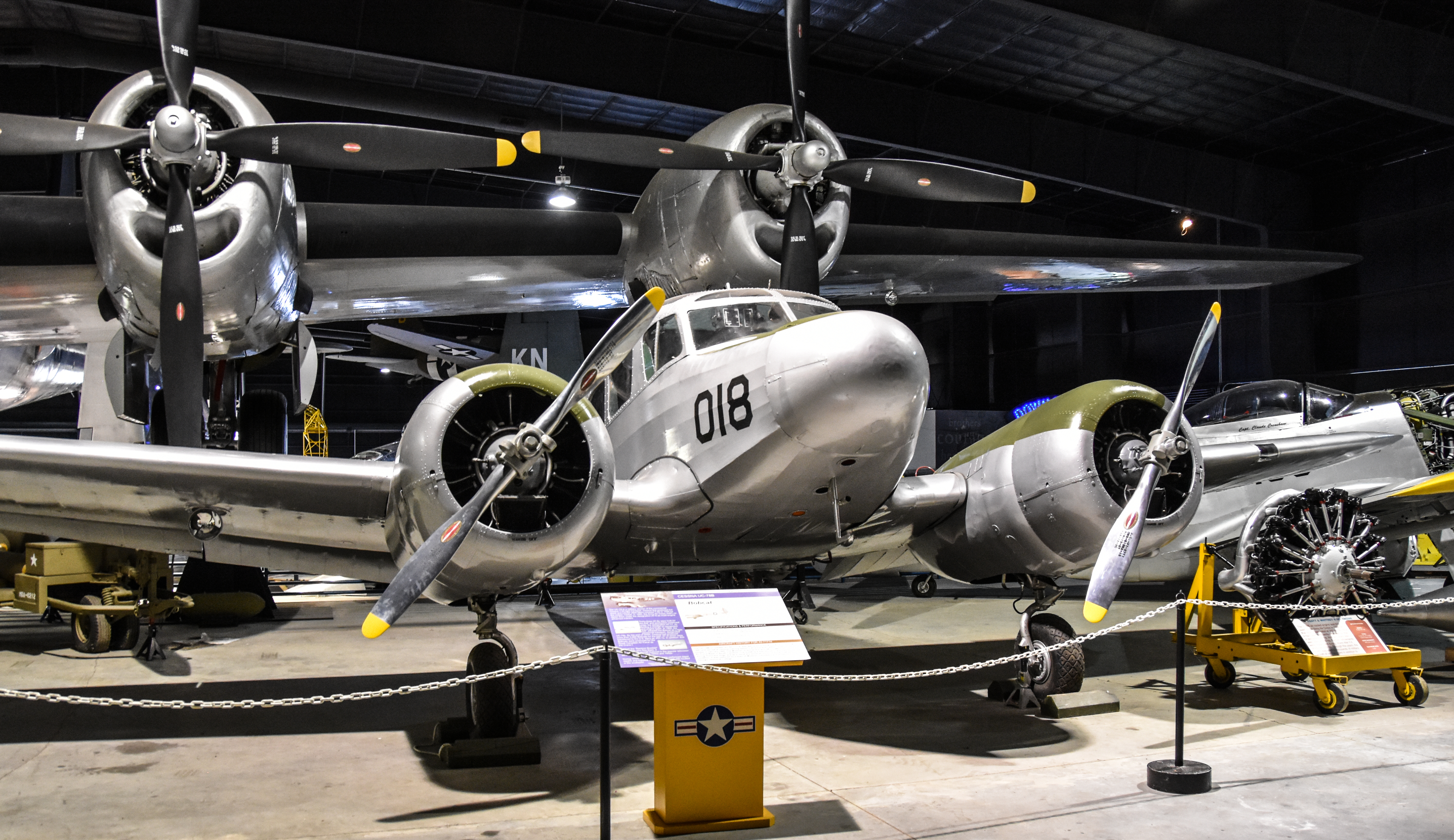
UC-78B at the Museum of Aviation

=== Canada ===
- 7829 – Crane Mk.I at the Western Development Museum in Moose Jaw, Saskatchewan.
- 7862 – Crane Mk.I airworthy at the Canadian Warplane Heritage Museum in Hamilton, Ontario.
- 8676 – Crane Mk.I on static display at the Canada Aviation and Space Museum in Ottawa, Ontario.
- 8769 – Crane Mk.IA airworthy with Vintage Wings of Canada in Gatineau, Quebec.
- 8778 – Crane Mk.IA the Reynolds-Alberta Museum in Wetaskiwin, Alberta.
- 8841 – Crane in storage at the Memorial Military Museum in Campbellford, Ontario.
- c/n 3760 – UC-78B at the Bomber Command Museum of Canada in Nanton, Alberta.
- Crane on static display at the Commonwealth Air Training Plan Museum in Brandon, Manitoba.
- T-50 on static display at The Hangar Flight Museum in Calgary, Alberta.

=== United States ===
- 8139 – Crane Mk.I airworthy at the Wings of War Museum in Palmyra, Pennsylvania.
- 42-39162 – UC-78B on static display at the Pima Air & Space Museum in Tucson, Arizona.
- 42-71507 – UC-78 on display at the Western Antique Aeroplane & Automobile Museum in Hood River, Oregon.
- 42-71626 – UC-78B on static display at the National Museum of the United States Air Force in Dayton, Ohio.
- 42-71714 – UC-78B on static display at the Museum of Aviation in Warner Robins, Georgia.
- 43-1838 – UC-78 in storage at the Castle Air Museum in Atwater, California.
- 43-7995 – UC-78B on static display at the National Naval Aviation Museum in Pensacola, Florida.
- 43-31765 – UC-78 at the Military Aviation Museum in Virginia Beach, Virginia.
- 43-31917 – UC-78B under restoration at the Mid-Atlantic Air Museum in Reading, Pennsylvania.
- 43-32549 – UC-78A airworthy at the National WASP WWII Museum at Avenger Field in Sweetwater, Texas.
- 43-32578 – UC-78B airworthy with the Jayhawk Wing of the Commemorative Air Force in Wichita, Kansas.
- 43-81935 – UC-78B in storage at the Mid-Atlantic Air Museum in Reading, Pennsylvania.
- 3696 – JRC-1 airworthy at the American Heritage Museum in Stow, Massachusetts.
- 64469 – JRC-1 in storage at the Yanks Air Museum in Chino, California.
- c/n 4629 – T-50 in storage at the Alaska Aviation Museum in Anchorage, Alaska.
- c/n 6184 – T-50 at the Airpower Museum in Ottumwa, Iowa.

== Specifications (AT-17) ==
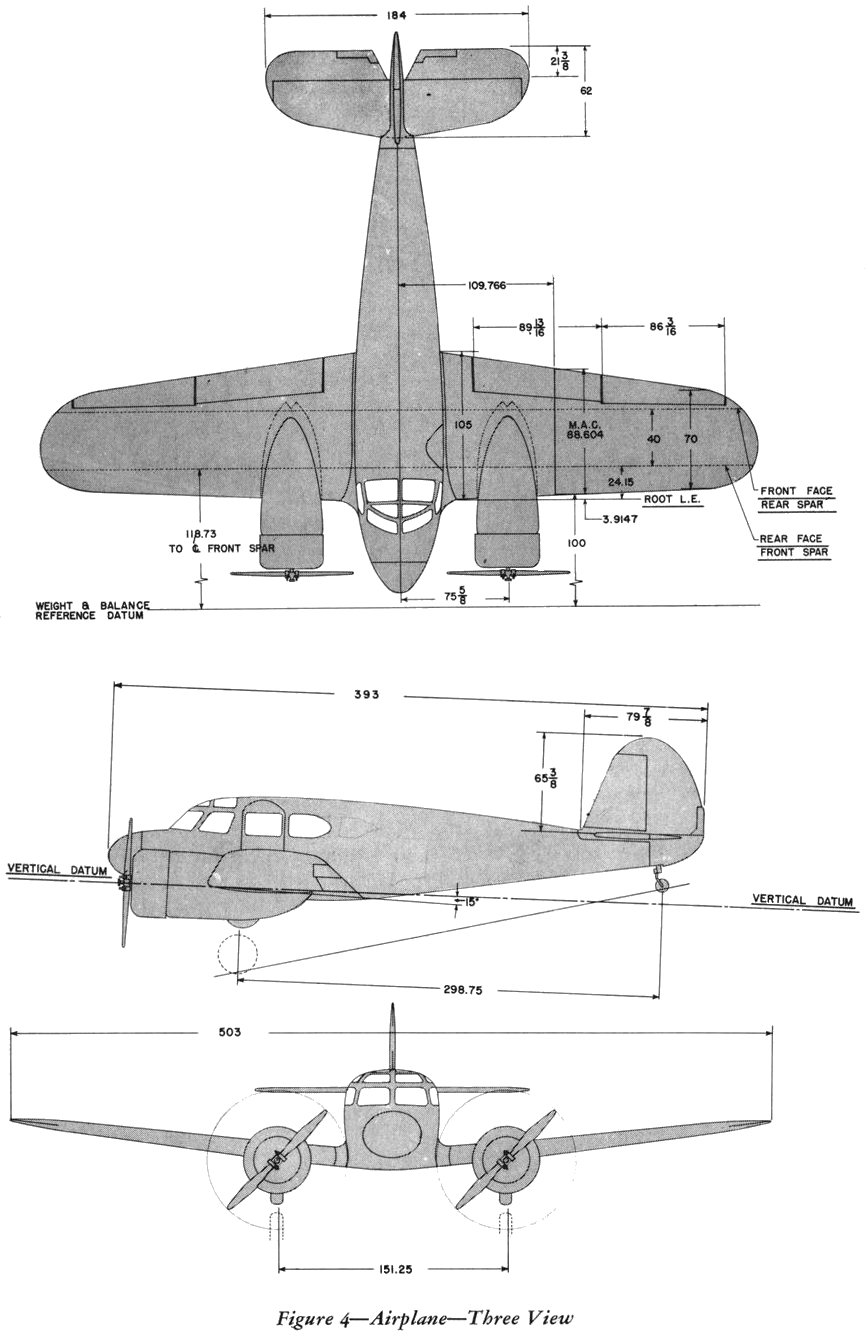
3-view line drawing of the Cessna AT-17 Bobcat

Data from American Military Training Aircraft: Fixed and Rotary-Wing Trainers Since 1916, National Museum of the United States Air Force

General characteristics

- Crew: Five (pilot and four passengers)
- Length: 32 ft 9 in (9.98 m)
- Wingspan: 41 ft 11 in (12.78 m)
- Height: 9 ft 11 in (3.02 m)
- Wing area: 295 sq ft (27.4 m^{2})
- Empty weight: 3,500 lb (1,588 kg)
- Gross weight: 5,700 lb (2,585 kg)
- Max takeoff weight: 6,062 lb (2,750 kg)
- Powerplant: 2 × Jacobs R-755-9 seven-cylinder, air-cooled, radial piston engine, 245 hp (183 kW) each

Performance

- Maximum speed: 195 mph (314 km/h, 169 kn)
- Cruise speed: 175 mph (282 km/h, 152 kn)
- Stall speed: 63–66 mph (101–106 km/h, 55–57 kn)
- Range: 750 mi (1,210 km, 650 nmi)
- Service ceiling: 22,000 ft (6,700 m)
- Rate of climb: 1,150 ft/min (5.8 m/s)
- Take-off run: 650 ft (200 m) to 50 ft (15 m) (Note: At a gross weight of 5,200 lb (2,400 kg))
- Landing run: 1,400 ft (430 m) from 50 ft (15 m) with a 90 mph (140 km/h) approach speed

== See also ==
Aircraft of comparable role, configuration, and era

- Airspeed Oxford
- Avro Anson
- Caproni Ca.313
- Farman F.430
- Potez 56
- Siebel Si 204
- Tachikawa Ki-54

Related lists

- List of aircraft of World War II
- List of aircraft of Canada's air forces
- List of aircraft of the United States during World War II
- List of military aircraft of the United States
