= Blue Devils (aerobatic team) =

Canadian military flight demonstration team 1949–1951

Blue Devils 410 (F) Squadron Aerobatic Team
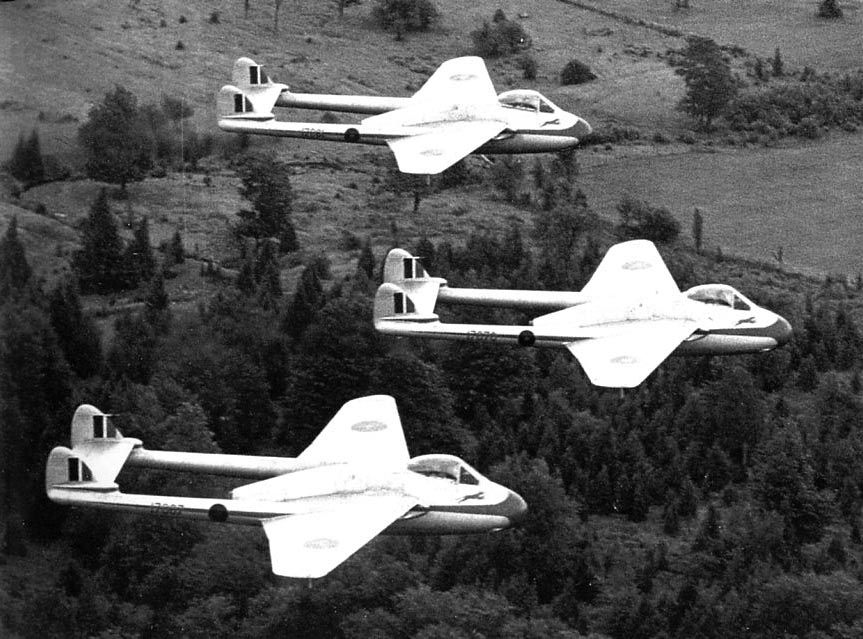
- Active: 4 May 1949 to 19 August 1951
- Country: Canada
- Branch: Royal Canadian Air Force
- Role: Aerobatic flight demonstration team
- Garrison/HQ: RCAF Station St. Hubert
- Nickname(s): Blue Devils

Commanders
- Notable commanders: Flight Lieutenant Don C. Laubman

Aircraft flown
- Fighter: de Havilland Vampire 1949-1951

The Blue Devils or the 410 (F) Squadron Aerobatic Team was a Royal Canadian Air Force (RCAF) aerobatic team that flew the de Havilland Vampire jet aircraft from 1949 to 1951. The unit was the RCAF's first postwar aerobatic team, and belonged to the RCAF's first operational jet fighter squadron, No. 410 Squadron.

== History ==
The Blue Devils started as a team of three by World War II flying ace Flight Lieutenant Don C. Laubman. Later, a fourth member was added to provide a solo performance. The team gained official recognition from the Air Defence Group shortly after its first show at RCAF Station Rockcliffe on 11 June 1949.

Thereafter, the Blue Devils expanded to six aircraft, including a second solo, and went on to fly at airshows around Canada and the United States. Despite a training accident on 25 July 1949 in which Squadron Leader Robert Kipp was killed near St. Hubert, the team went on to become the de facto official RCAF aerobatic team. The team's official name became the Air Defence Group Aerobatic Team in 1950.

== Disbandment ==
The Blue Devils were disbanded in September 1950 as its members were posted to different squadrons and the Vampire was retired in favour of the F-86 Sabre. The team was temporarily reformed on 8 August 1951, however, because of an air show commitment. The last air show was flown on 19 August 1951 at the Michigan Air Fair in Detroit. During its three years of existence, the Blue Devils performed at 45 air shows in Canada and the United States.
