= RCAF Station Claresholm =

Former Royal Canadian Air Force station

- Claresholm, Alberta in Canada
- RCAF Station Claresholm hangars in 2006

Site information
- Owner: Royal Canadian Air Force

Location
- Location in Alberta
- Coordinates: 50°00′17″N 113°37′48″W

Site history
- Built: June 9, 1941
- In use: 1958
- Fate: Became Claresholm Industrial Airport

Airfield information
- Elevation: 2,950 ft (900 m) AMSL
Runways
Direction	Length and surface
2/20	3,000 ft (910 m) Hard Surface
2/20	2,970 ft (910 m) Hard Surface
16/34	2,950 ft (900 m) Hard Surface
16/34	3,270 ft (1,000 m) Hard Surface
11/29	3,180 ft (970 m) Hard Surface
11/29	2,930 ft (890 m) Hard Surface

RCAF Station Claresholm was a British Commonwealth Air Training Plan station that trained pilots for World War II service. The station was located near Claresholm, Alberta, Canada.

== History ==
=== World War II ===
No. 15 Service Flying Training School (SFTS) opened on 9 June 1941, and closed on 30 March 1945. The school used Anson and Cessna Crane aircraft, and its relief airfields were RCAF Woodhouse, a few kilometers east at 49°59′24″N 113°26′51″W, and RCAF Pulteney, a few kilometers north. No. 2 Flying Instructor School (FIS) was established as a sub unit of No. 15 SFTS on 27 April 1942 but relocated in September 1942 to Vulcan. Student pilots at No.2 FIS flew Tiger Moths and Cessna Cranes.

==== Aerodrome information ====
In approximately 1942 the aerodrome was listed at 50°00′N 113°38′W with a variation of 23 degrees east and elevation of 3,325 ft (1,013 m). Six runways were listed as follows:

Runway Name	Length	Width	Surface
2/20	3,000 ft (910 m)	100 ft (30 m)	Hard surfaced
2/20	3,100 ft (940 m)	100 ft (30 m)	Hard surfaced
14/32	3,100 ft (940 m)	100 ft (30 m)	Hard surfaced
14/32	3,100 ft (940 m)	100 ft (30 m)	Hard surfaced
8/26	3,000 ft (910 m)	100 ft (30 m)	Hard surfaced
8/26	3,200 ft (980 m)	100 ft (30 m)	Hard surfaced

==== Relief landing field – Woodhouse ====
The primary Relief Landing Field (R1) for RCAF Station Claresholm was located southeast of the community of Claresholm. In approximately 1942 the aerodrome was listed at 50°00′N 113°27′W with a variation of 23 degrees east and elevation of 3,300 ft (1,000 m). Three runways were listed as follows:

Runway Name	Length	Width	Surface
2/20	3,020 ft (920 m)	100 ft (30 m)	Hard surfaced
14/32	3,020 ft (920 m)	100 ft (30 m)	Hard surfaced
8/26	3,020 ft (920 m)	100 ft (30 m)	Hard surfaced

A more accurate set of coordinates can be found at 49°59′24″N 113°26′51″W at this location the outline of the three runways is still visible on Google Earth. The site is presently used for agricultural purposes.

=== Postwar ===
Claresholm was placed on care and maintenance status until reactivated in 1951 as a NATO training centre run by No. 3 Flying Training School (flying Harvards). The station closed again in 1958 when the school was relocated to Gimli, Manitoba. It is now the Claresholm Industrial Airport. As of August 2011, hangars 2 to 4 are derelict and deteriorating.
