= RCAF Station Pearce =

Former air station in Alberta, Canada

- Near Pearce, Alberta in Canada

Site information
- Owner: Dept of National Defence (Canada)

Location
- Location within Alberta
- Coordinates: 49°50′06″N 113°14′31″W

Airfield information
- Elevation: 3,110 ft (950 m) AMSL
Runways
Direction	Length and surface
1/19	3,113 ft (949 m) hard surface
7/25	3,113 ft (949 m) hard surface
13/31	3,113 ft (949 m) hard surface

RCAF Station Pearce, or RCAF Aerodrome Pearce or BCATP Station Pearce, was a Second World War training air station of the British Commonwealth Air Training Plan (BCATP). It was located northeast of Fort Macleod, Alberta, Canada.

== History ==
=== World War II ===
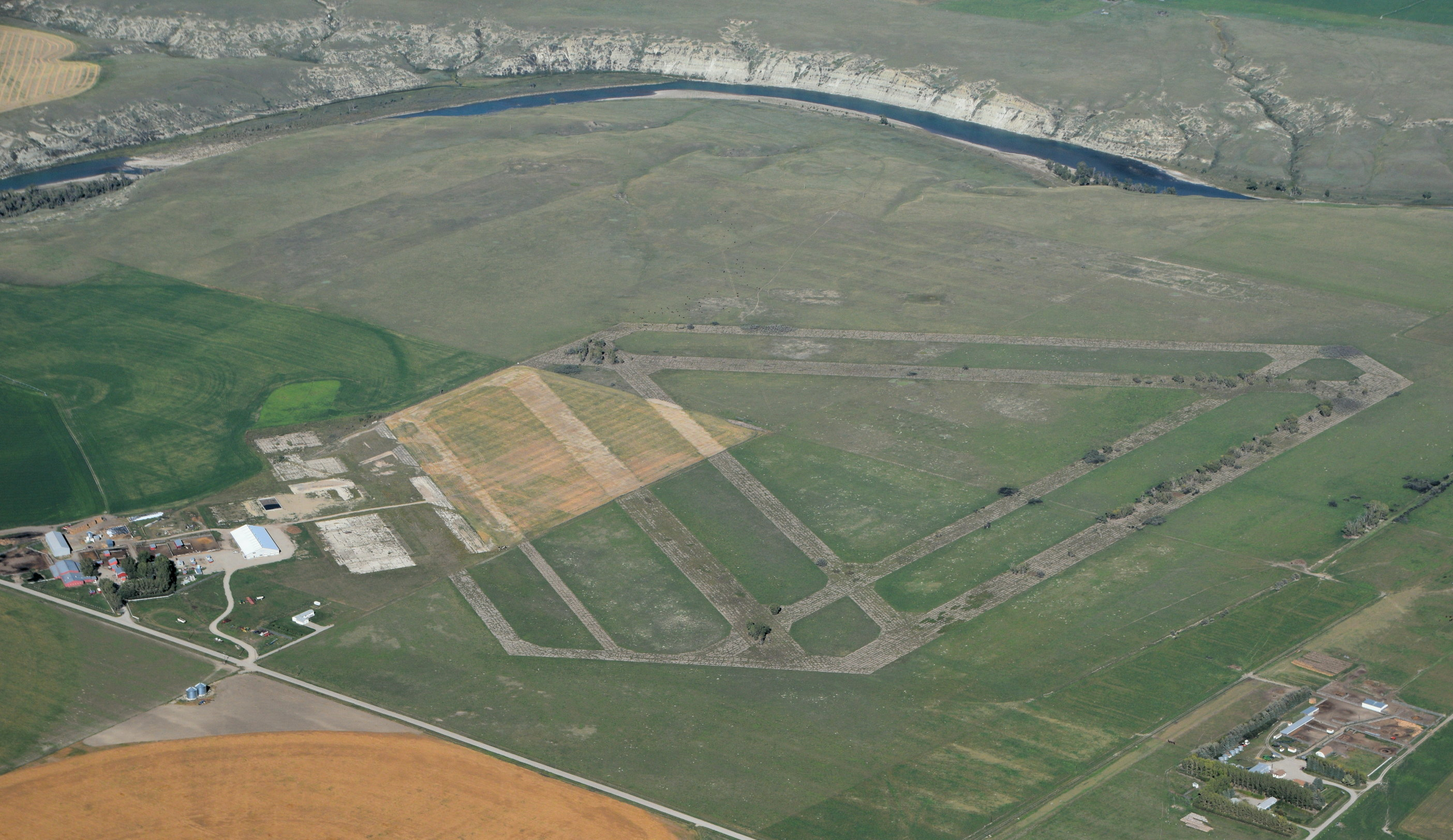
Aerial View: RCAF Pearce 9/2/2016

The Pearce aerodrome was the home of three training schools: No. 36 Elementary Flying Training School (EFTS), a Royal Air Force school which operated from March to August 1942 (flying Tiger Moths and Stearmans); No. 3 Air Observer School (AOS) (using Ansons), which operated from September 1942 to June 1943; and No. 2 Flying Instructor School (FIS), which flew Cornells, Cranes, Fawns, Finchs, Harvards, Oxfords, Tiger Moths and Ansons. No. 2 FIS operated from May 1943 to January 1945, having moved from Vulcan.

==== Aerodrome information ====
In approximately 1942 the aerodrome was listed at 49°50′N 113°15′W with a variation of 23 degrees east and elevation of 3,110 ft (950 m). Three runways were listed as follows:

Runway name	Length	Width	Surface
1/19	3,113 ft (949 m)	150 ft (46 m)	Hard surfaced
7/25	3,113 ft (949 m)	150 ft (46 m)	Hard surfaced
13/31	3,113 ft (949 m)	150 ft (46 m)	Hard surfaced

=== Postwar ===
In 1945, after the end of the war in the Pacific, Avro Lancaster bombers which the RCAF intended to be used against Japan as part of the Tiger Force (air) were flown to Pearce for storage and dispersal. According to one source, 83 Lancasters arrived at the airfield on a single afternoon in September, with many of their pilots putting on an impromptu airshow before landing their aircraft for the last time.

The aerodrome is still visible today; however, all of the structures from the old station have been removed. A memorial cairn has been installed at the site of the original guard house to inform visitors of the station's history.
