= No. 23 Elementary Flying Training School =

Canadian flight training school during WWII

No. 23 Elementary Flying Training School was a Second World War, pilot training school that was established as a component of the British Commonwealth Air Training Plan(BCATP). The school was originally established by the Royal Canadian Air Force on 9 November 1942 at RCAF Station Davidson, Saskatchewan. On 19 January 1945 the school was moved to RCAF Station Yorkton, Saskatchewan. The school was disbanded on 15 September 1945 as both the war and the BCATP were being wound down and the requirement for additional air crew was reduced.
