= Don C. Laubman =

Royal Canadian Air Force officer

Donald Currie Laubman DFC AOE CD
- Born: 16 October 1921; Provost, Alberta
- Died: 20 June 2018 (aged 96)
- Military career
- Allegiance: Canada
- Branch: Royal Canadian Air Force
- Service years: 1940 – 1972
- Rank: Lieutenant General
- Conflicts: World War II
- Awards: Distinguished Flying Cross; Alberta Order of Excellence; Canadian Forces' Decoration

Lieutenant-General Donald Currie Laubman, DFC AOE CD (16 October 1921 – 20 June 2018) was a Second World War Canadian fighter pilot and flying ace. He remained in the Canadian armed services after the war rising to the rank of Lieutenant-General.

== Biography ==
Laubman was born in Provost, Alberta, on 16 October 1921. He enlisted in the Royal Canadian Air Force (RCAF) in September 1940, and completed his pilot training in Calgary at No 3 Service Flying Training School (SFTS). Rated above average as a pilot, he then served as an instructor at No 31 Elementary Flying Training School (EFTS) at De Winton. In September 1942 he was commissioned and served with No. 133 Squadron, RCAF on the Canadian west coast until May 1943.

== Service career ==
In September 1942 he was commissioned and served with No. 133 Squadron, at Boundary Bay, British Columbia, Canada until May 1943. In August 1943 he went overseas to RAF Redhill in the United Kingdom and then posted to No. 412 Squadron RAF, 126 Wing (83 Group, 2nd Tactical Air Force).

In the late spring and early summer of 1944 Flight Lieutenant Laubman and 412 Squadron were based in Tangmere, West Sussex, and flew fighter operations over occupied Europe. After witnessing an impassioned speech given by General Dwight D. Eisenhower, 412 crossed the English Channel on 6 June 1944 (D-Day), covering the landings on Juno Beach.

From D-Day to VE Day, 13 RCAF fighter pilots in service on the continent accounted for more than 120 German aircraft claimed destroyed. The top scorer was Squadron Leader Don Laubman, with 15 victories.

On 26 and 27 September Laubman flew four missions and downed seven enemy aircraft; four German Focke-Wulf Fw 190s and three German Messerschmitt Bf 109s (plus another Bf 109 damaged). This happened in the Nijmegen area (the location of Operation Market-Garden, the airborne operation to capture the Dutch Rhine bridges.) After his tour ended he arrived back in Canada in November 1944. Laubman applied to return to active duty and was assigned command of No. 402 Squadron RAF as a Squadron Leader. When Laubman's Spitfire was downed by the explosion of his strafed target, he became a prisoner of war on 14 April 1945.

== Tally ==
Laubman's final count was 15 destroyed, and 3 damaged. 14 of those 15 were between June and October 1944. His decorations include the Distinguished Flying Cross and Bar as well as the Canadian Forces' Decoration with two Bars. He is the fourth ranking RCAF ace.

== Postwar career ==
He was released from the RCAF in September 1945, but rejoined the RCAF in January 1946. Laubman first served with No. 6 Communications Flight, NWAC. He was a founding member of the Blue Devils aerobatic team and flew with the team from 1949 to 1951. He then commanded No. 416 Squadron from January 1951 to March 1952. He went on to command No. 3 Wing at Zweibrücken from July 1963 to August 1966. In April 1967 he was promoted to Air Commodore and he took up command of No. 1 Air Division in July 1969, remaining in the post until April 1970. He was then made Commander of Canadian Forces Europe in April 1970 to August 1971 before becoming Chief of Personnel, CFHQ in May 1972 until his retirement. Upon his retirement he held the rank of Lieutenant General.

In 1979, he opened a Canadian Tire store in Red Deer, Alberta, and was very active in community affairs. In 2007, he was awarded the Alberta Order of Excellence for distinguished service as a fighter pilot with the Royal Canadian Air Force and as a central Alberta business and community leader.

He died in June 2018 at the age of 96. Two CF-18 Hornet fighters from the RCAF base at Cold Lake, Alberta, performed a flyby at the celebration of life for him and his wife in Red Deer.
