= RCAF Station Vulcan =

Former Canadian air force station

- Near Vulcan, Alberta in Canada

Site information
- Owner: Dept of National Defence (Canada)

Location
- Coordinates: 50°19′55″N 113°21′28″W

Site history
- In use: 1942–1945

Garrison information
- Occupants: No. 2 FIS (1942–43); No. 19 SFTS (1943–1945)

Airfield information
- Elevation: 3,400 feet (1,036 m) AMSL
Runways
Direction	Length and surface
2/20	3,125 feet (952 m) hard surface
8/26	3,100 feet (945 m) hard surface
14/32	3,100 feet (945 m) hard surface

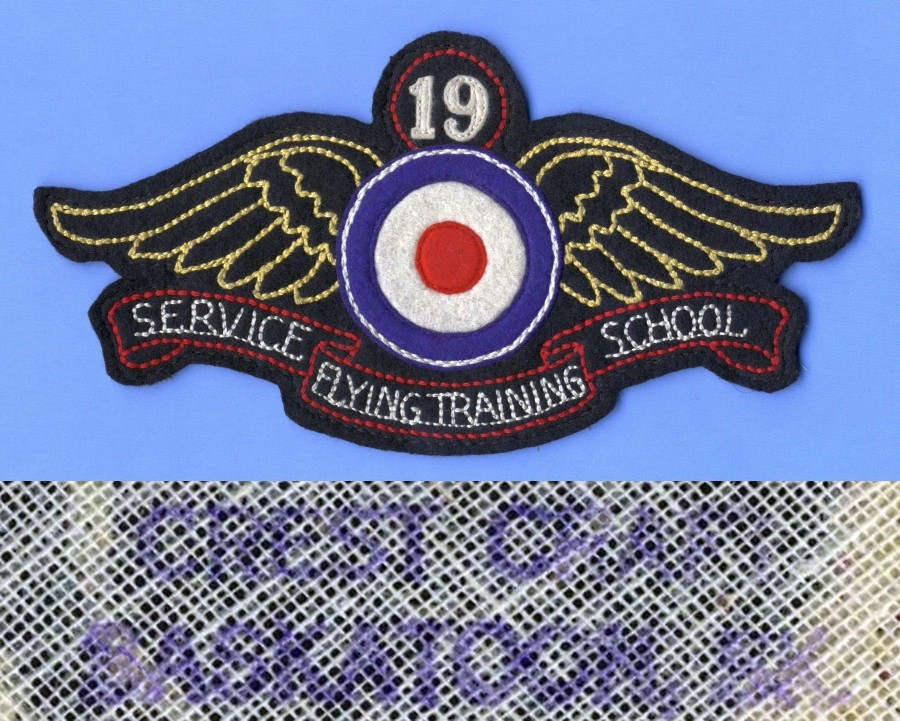
Jacket patch from No. 19 Service Flying Training School

RCAF Station Vulcan, also referred to as RCAF Aerodrome Vulcan, was a Second World War flying training station located southwest of the town of Vulcan, Alberta, Canada. It was one of many stations that were established in Canada under the British Commonwealth Air Training Plan.

== History ==
The Vulcan aerodrome hosted No. 2 Flying Instructor School (FIS), which was formally established at the station on 3 August 1942. However No. 2 FIS started training at RCAF Station Claresholm on 27 April 1942 under the control of No. 15 Service Flying Training School. The aircraft used were Cornells, Cranes, Fawns, Finches, Harvards, Oxfords, Tiger Moths and Ansons. On 3 May 1943, No. 2 FIS moved to the Pearce aerodrome near Fort Macleod and No. 19 Service Flying Training School (SFTS) took over the facilities, training future bomber pilots using the Anson. No. 19 SFTS ceased operation on April 14, 1945. Relief or auxiliary landing fields were located at Ensign and Champion.

=== Aerodrome ===
In approximately 1942 the aerodrome was listed at 50°20′N 113°21′W with a Var. 23 degrees E and elevation of 3,400 feet (1,036 m). Three runways were listed as follows:

Runway name	Length	Width	Surface
2/20	3,125 feet (952 m)	150 feet (46 m)	Hard surfaced
8/26	3,100 feet (945 m)	150 feet (46 m)	Hard surfaced
14/32	3,100 feet (945 m)	150 feet (46 m)	Hard surfaced

=== Relief landing field – Ensign ===
The primary Relief Landing Field (R1) for RCAF Station Vulcan was located east of the community of Ensign, Alberta. In approximately 1942 the aerodrome was listed at 50°29′N 113°20′W with a Var. 23 degrees E and elevation of 2,434 feet (742 m). Three runways were listed as follows:

Runway name	Length	Width	Surface
3/21	3,175 feet (968 m)	150 feet (46 m)	Hard surfaced
12/30	3,175 feet (968 m)	150 feet (46 m)	Hard surfaced
15/33	3,175 feet (968 m)	150 feet (46 m)	Hard surfaced

=== Relief landing field – Champion ===
The secondary Relief Landing Field (R2) for RCAF Station Vulcan was located approximately southwest of the community of Champion, Alberta. In approximately 1942 the aerodrome was listed at 50°13′N 113°11′W with a Var. 23 degrees E and elevation of 3,200 feet (975 m). The aerodrome was listed as "Turf" and "All-way field" with two runways listed as follows:

Runway name	Length	Width	Surface
3/21	6,200 feet (1,890 m)	500 feet (152 m)	Turf
12/30	3,600 feet (1,097 m)	500 feet (152 m)	Turf

== Postwar ==
For a period of time the old station operated as the Vulcan Industrial Airport. Although the runways still exist, the aerodrome has seen many aircraft since the war. Six of the original seven hangars remain standing. The remaining hangars are used for storage and for private industrial purposes. Three of the building owners are working to restore their hangars.

In 2009 new ownership began re-invigorating the airport. In 2011 it was reopened as Vulcan/Kirkcaldy Aerodrome, operated by Wheatland Industries. The aerodrome is currently being used by private aircraft and one spray plane company.

This is the main operating field for the Southern Alberta Gliding Centre of the Air Cadet Gliding Program.

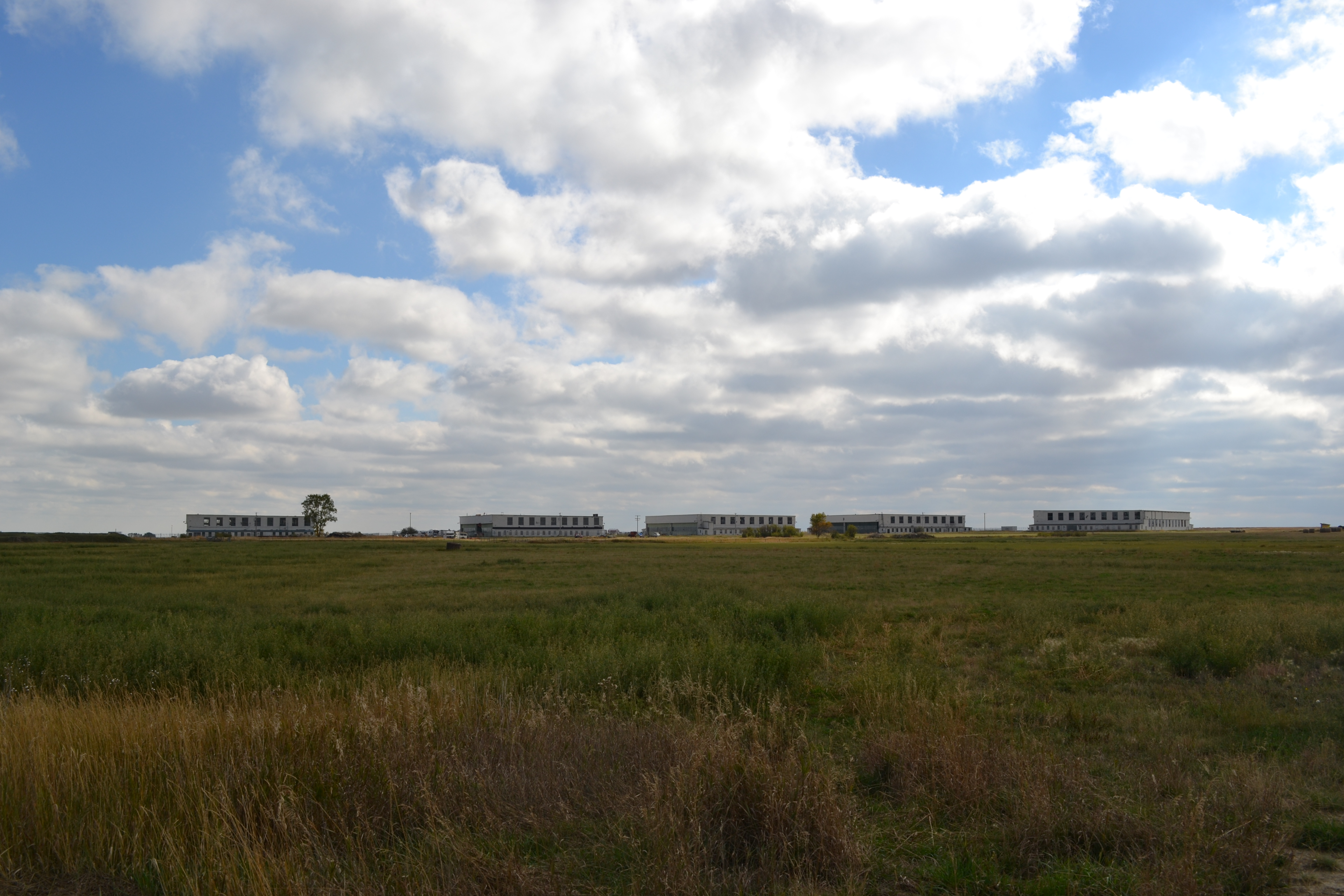
Remaining hangars

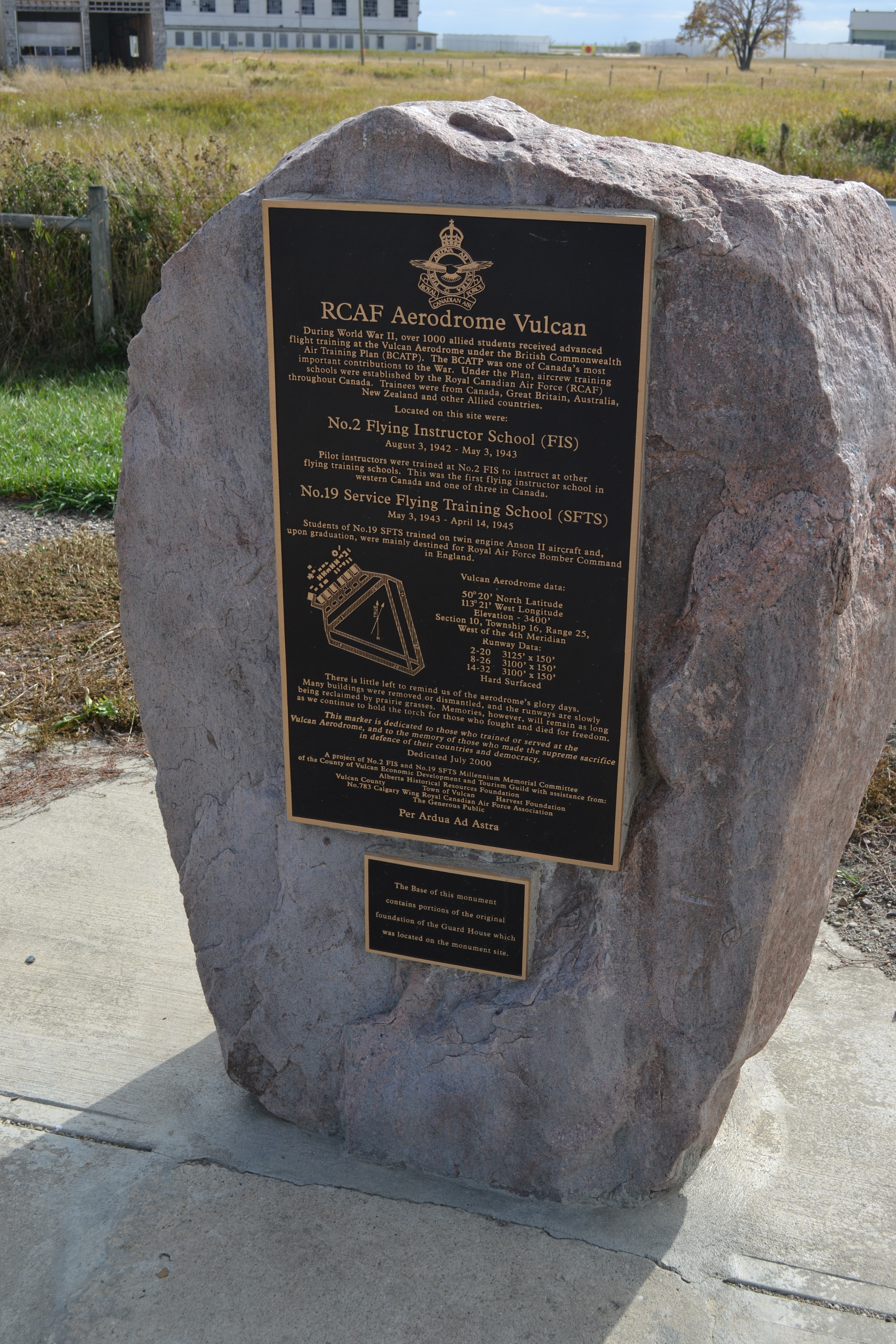
Historical marker commemorating the former RCAF Aerodrome

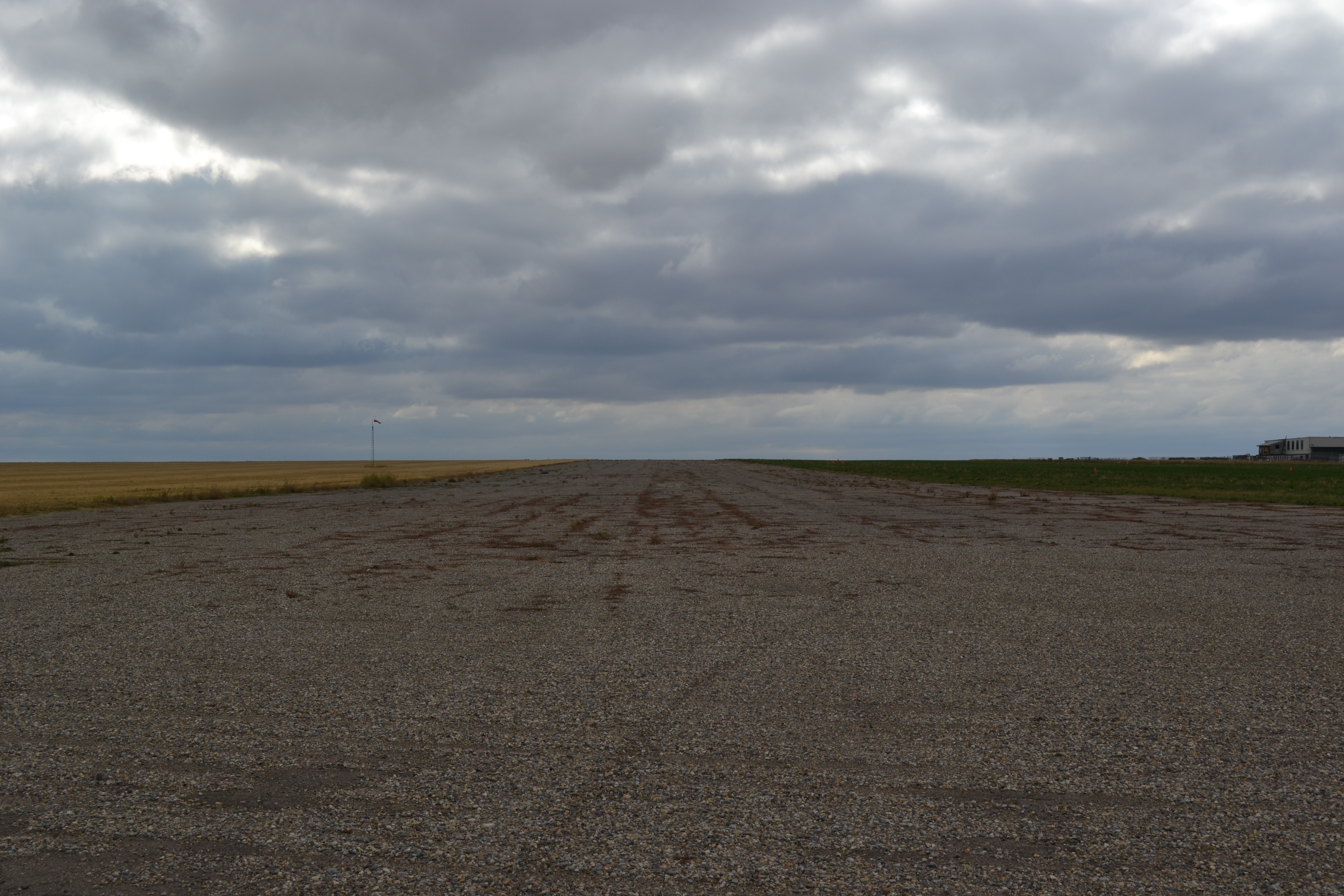
Ground level view of a runway at the Vulcan/Kirkcaldy Aerodrome

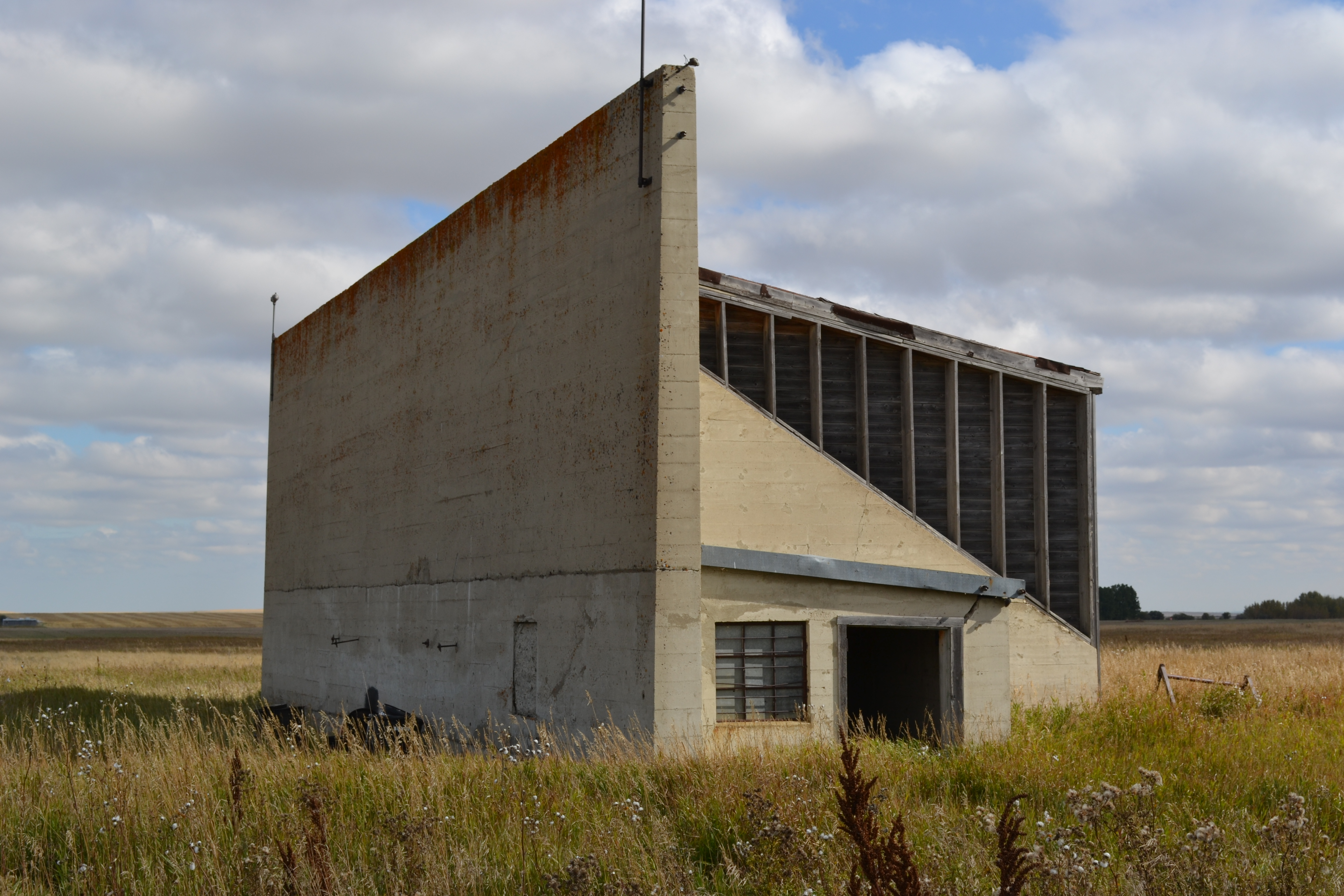
A former pistol range located at the airfield

== See also ==
- Vulcan Airport
