= Millet Lagarde ML-10 =

French light aircraft

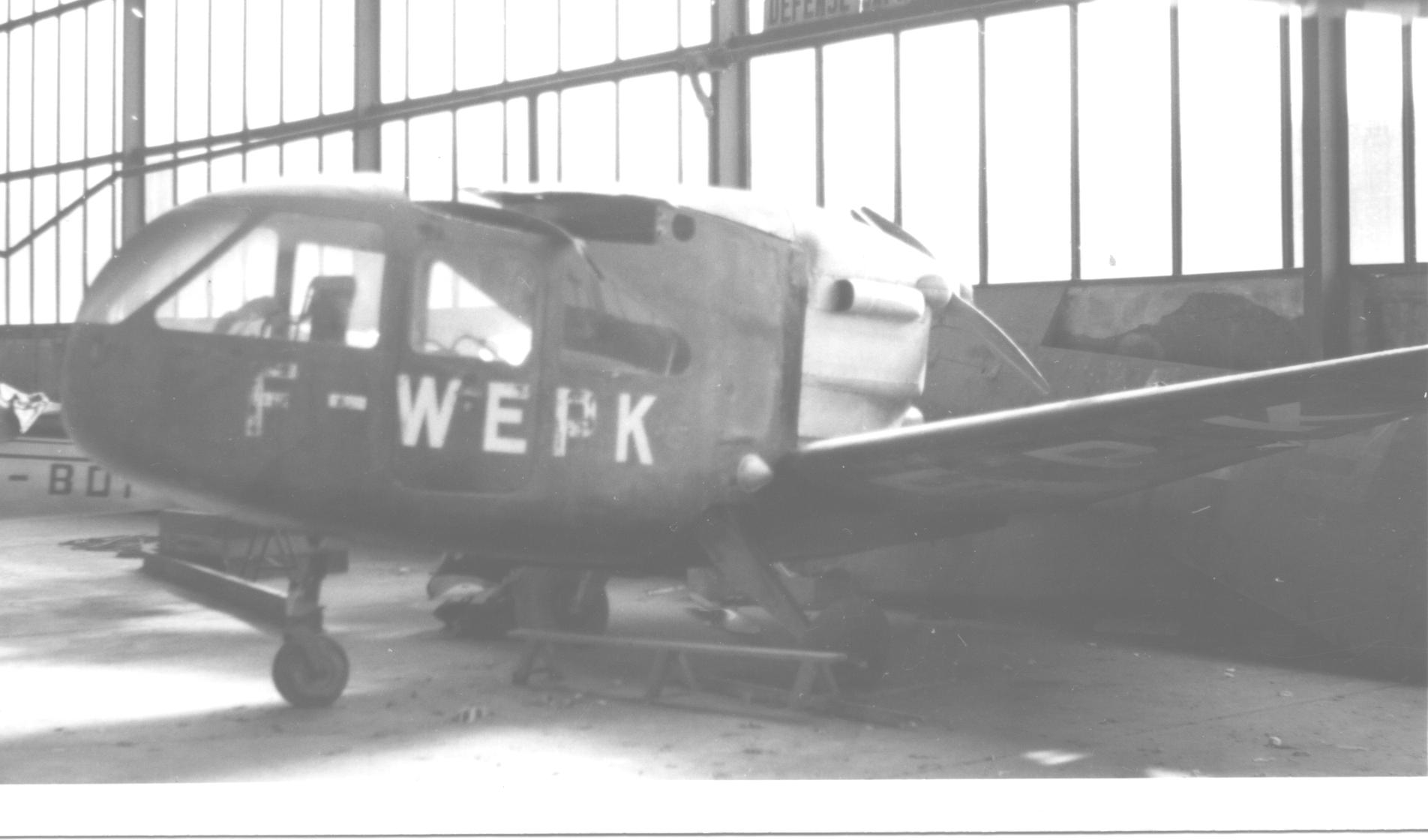
- The first ML-10 at Pontoise airfield in May 1957. The upper wing has been detached from the cabin roof and the fins dismantled

General information
- Type: experimental light aircraft
- National origin: France
- Manufacturer: Millet Lagarde
- Number built: 2

History
- First flight: 28 October 1949
- Retired: 1957

The Millet Lagarde ML-10 was a French experimental single-engine light aircraft of the late 1940s. This strange biplane model, which first flew on 28 October 1949, was designed as the first of two examples.

== Development ==
The Millet Lagarde ML-10 was a one-off prototype of an experimental four-seat biplane. The upper wing was fixed to the cabin roof and the lower wing was fixed to the bottom of the cabin. The wings were heavily staggered so that the upper wing's trailing edge and lower wing's leading edge were vertically in line with each other.

The Regnier 180 hp (134 kW) R6B engine was fitted at the rear of the cabin in pusher layout. Twin booms supported the twin fins and a medium/high-set tailplane. The aircraft was fitted with a tricycle undercarriage.

The first prototype, F-WEPK, was completed in 1949 and by 1957 was in storage at Pontoise/Cormeilles-en-Vexin airfield to the west of Paris. A second aircraft, with some modifications, was built by SCAM (Société des Constructions Aéronautiques du Maine) and designated SCAM C.50 Milane II, registered as F-WEAI. No example of this unusual aircraft design survives in existence.

== Specifications ==
Data from Aviafrance

General characteristics

- Crew: 1
- Capacity: 3 passengers
- Length: 8.00 m (26 ft 3 in)
- Wingspan: 10.00 m (32 ft 10 in)
- Height: 2.70 m (8 ft 10 in)
- Wing area: 30.00 m^{2} (323 sq ft)
- Gross weight: 1,600 kg (3,527 lb)
- Powerplant: 1 × Regnier R6B , 134 kW (180 hp)

Performance

- Maximum speed: 235 km/h (146 mph, 127 kn)
- Cruise speed: 210 km/h (130 mph, 110 kn)
- Range: 1,200 km (745 mi, 647 nmi)
- Service ceiling: 6,000 m (19,685 ft)
- Rate of climb: 4.00 m/s (787 ft/min)
