= RCAF Station Davidson =

Former RCAF Station

- Davidson, Saskatchewan; Near Davidson, Saskatchewan in Canada

Site information
- Operator: Formerly Royal Canadian Air Force

Location
- Location within Saskatchewan
- Coordinates: 51°15′N 105°53′W

Airfield information
- Identifiers: IATA: none, ICAO: none
- Elevation: 1,985 ft (605 m) AMSL
Runways
Direction	Length and surface
13/31	2,800 ft (850 m) Hard Surfaced
7/25	2,700 ft (820 m) Hard Surfaced
1/19	2,900 ft (880 m) Hard Surfaced

RCAF Station Davidson was a Second World War air training station located near Davidson, Saskatchewan, Canada.

== History ==
=== World War II ===
The Royal Canadian Air Force (RCAF), opened No. 23 Elementary Flying Training School (EFTS) at RCAF Station Davidson on 9 November 1942. The school and station were a component of the British Commonwealth Air Training Plan. The school was relocated to RCAF Station Yorkton 19 January 1945 and the station was decommissioned shortly thereafter. No. 23 EFTS was the only RCAF operated EFTS in Canada, and was twice the size of all but 2 EFTS. The school produced 1,513 pilots of whom 973 were RCAF and 540 Royal Air Force.

=== Aerodrome information ===
The airfield was constructed in the typical BCATP wartime pattern, with three runways formed in a triangle. In approximately 1942 the aerodrome was listed as RCAF Aerodrome - Davidson, Saskatchewan at 51°15′N 105°53′W with a variation of 19 degrees east and elevation of 1,985 ft (605 m). Three runways were under construction (serviceable) and listed as follows:

Runway Name	Length	Width	Surface
13/31	2,800 ft (850 m)	100 ft (30 m)	Hard surfaced
7/25	2,700 ft (820 m)	100 ft (30 m)	Hard surfaced
1/19	2,900 ft (880 m)	100 ft (30 m)	Hard surfaced

=== Relief landing field – Davidson West ===
The only relief landing field for RCAF Station Davidson was located west of the community of Davidson, Saskatchewan. The relief field was constructed in the typical triangular pattern but was listed on decommissioning of the facility as a turf all way field. The cost to develop the aerodrome was $60,673.39. The aerodrome was located on approximately 78 acres of the south west quarter of section 36 in township 26 in range 1, west of the 3rd meridian. Using tools on the Saskatchewan Land titles web page this land description was able to be cross referenced to 51.264599°N 106.018625°W. The aerodrome was declared surplus on 15 June 1945 and was officially turned over to the Department of Transportation on 31 October 1945.

=== Other occupants ===
The RCAF Women's Division arrived at the school on 17 May 1943.

No. 205 Reserve Equipment Maintenance Satellite was established at the Station on 1 April 1945.

== Current status ==
All that remains are cement foundations and the gun butt. From a survey of the location on google maps on 8 Jun 2018 it appears that two of the three runways are badly deteriorated with the last in better condition. several buildings appear to have been built on the old runways.

== See also ==
- Davidson, Saskatchewan
- Davidson Municipal Airport
