= Eklund TE-1 =

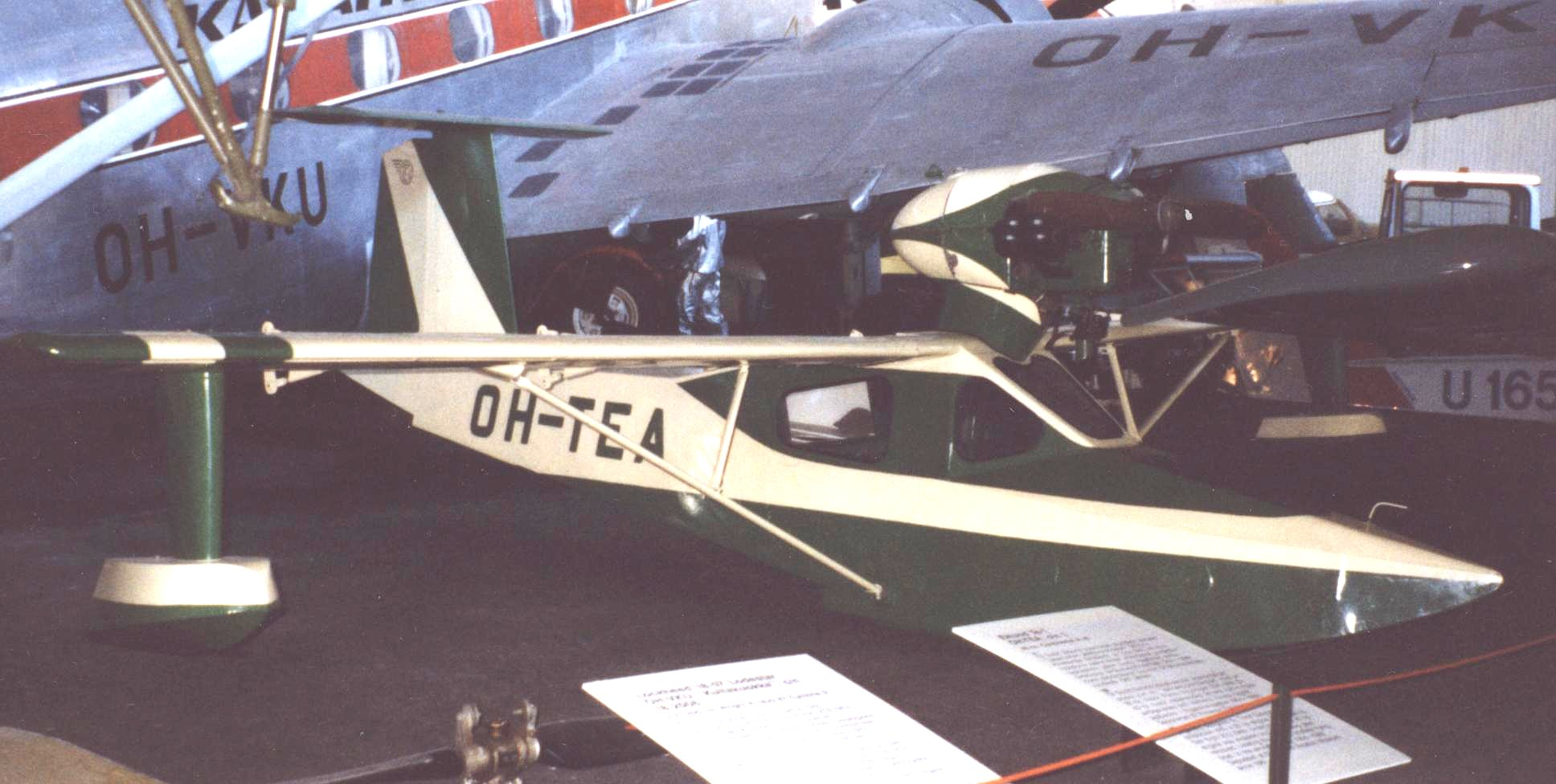
- The Eklund TE-1 single-seat flying boat of 1949 at the Aviation Museum, Helsinki Vantaa airport, in September 1994

General information
- Type: single-seat flying boat
- National origin: Finland
- Manufacturer: Eklund
- Designer: Torolf Eklund
- Status: preserved in museum
- Primary user: private owner
- Number built: 1

History
- First flight: 24 February 1949
- Retired: 1969

The Eklund TE-1 was a Finnish-built single-seat flying boat of the late 1940s.

== Design and development ==
The TE-1 was designed in late 1948 by Torolf Eklund, who was a Finnish aircraft designer for Valtion Lentokonetehdas between 1935 and 1962. The TE-1 was financed and built by Eklund as a private venture.

== Operational history ==
The TE-1 first flew in February 1949 powered by a 28 h.p. Poinsard engine. This powerplant suffered a crankcase failure, and as spare parts were no longer available, it was replaced by a Continental A40-5 engine. At the time of its first flight, the TE-1 was claimed to be the world's smallest flying boat. The aircraft last flew in 1969. It is now preserved in the Suomen Ilmailumuseo (Finnish Aviation Museum) at Helsinki Vantaa airport.

== Variants ==
The following proposed derivatives were developed, but only the prototype TE-1 was completed and flown.

- TE-1A with retractable four-wheel undercarriage
- TE-1B flying boat configuration
- TE-1B-S flying boat with skis
- TE-1B-G flying boat with breaching gear

== Specifications (TE-1) ==
Data from

General characteristics

- Crew: 1
- Length: 5.2 m (17 ft 1 in)
- Wingspan: 7.5 m (24 ft 7 in)
- Height: 1.8 m (5 ft 11 in)
- Wing area: 5.57 m^{2} (60.0 sq ft)
- Airfoil: NACA 4415
- Empty weight: 201 kg (443 lb)
- Gross weight: 324 kg (714 lb)
- Powerplant: 1 × Continental A40-5 4-cylinder air-cooled horizontally-opposed piston engine, 30 kW (40 hp)
- Propellers: 2-bladed fixed-pitch propeller

Performance

- Maximum speed: 150 km/h (93 mph, 81 kn)
- Cruise speed: 132 km/h (82 mph, 71 kn)

== See also ==
Related lists

- List of flying boats and floatplanes
