= Robert Kipp =

Canadian flying ace of WWII

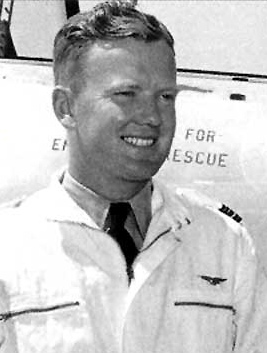
- Born: 12 October 1919; Kamloops, Canada
- Died: 25 July 1949 (aged 29); St. Hubert Airbase, Canada
- Burial place: Kamloops Cemetery, Kamloops, Canada
- Military career
- Allegiance: Canada
- Branch: Royal Canadian Air Force
- Service years: 1940–1945; 1946–1949
- Rank: Squadron Leader
- Units: Fighter Experimental Flight; No. 418 Squadron
- Commands: No. 410 Squadron
- Conflicts: Second World War: Operation Overlord
- Awards: Distinguished Service Order; Distinguished Flying Cross

Robert Kipp, DSO, DFC (12 October 1919 – 25 July 1949) was a Canadian flying ace who served in the Royal Canadian Air Force (RCAF) during the Second World War. He was credited with at least ten aerial victories.

Born in Kamloops, Kipp joined the RCAF in 1940 and once his flying training was completed, was retained in Canada on instructing duties rather than being assigned to an operational posting. He eventually was sent to the United Kingdom in early 1943, and was posted to No. 418 Squadron in November, flying the de Havilland Mosquito heavy fighter. He achieved the first of his aerial victories the following month, which began a successful six-month period of operations. He spent a period of time on staff duties from July to December before being posted to the Fighter Experimental Unit, with which he achieved more victories. He was discharged from the RCAF at the end of war but rejoined the service several months later. Appointed commander of No. 410 Squadron in 1948, he was killed in a flying accident the following July when his de Havilland Vampire jet fighter crashed at St. Hubert Airbase.

== Early life ==
Robert Allan Kipp was born in the city of Kamloops in British Columbia, Canada, on 12 October 1919, the son of Walter and Clara Kipp. He was studying pharmacology at the time of his enlistment in the Royal Canadian Air Force (RCAF) in late June 1940. Once his flight training at No. 4 Elementary Flying Training School at Windsor was completed, he was commissioned as a pilot officer.

== Second World War ==
Instead of being dispatched to the United Kingdom on an operational assignment, Kipp was retained in Canada as a flight instructor, stationed at No. 11 Service Flying Training School at Yorkton Station. It was not until early 1943 that he was sent to the United Kingdom. He spent several months at No. 12 (P) Advanced Flying School before proceeding to No. 60 Operational Training Unit at High Ercall for familiarisation on the de Havilland Mosquito heavy fighter. In November, he was posted to No. 418 Squadron.

=== Service with No. 418 Squadron ===
Kipp's new unit was an Article XV squadron, formed under the British Commonwealth Air Training Plan, and composed mostly of RCAF flying personnel. Equipped with the Mosquito and based at Ford, it performed in a intruder role, flying sorties into France and the Low Countries. Kipp, by this time promoted to flight lieutenant, was paired with Flying Officer Peter Huletsky as his navigator and on 12 December 1943, the duo, flying a sortie to France with another Mosquito of the squadron, achieved their first aerial victories; they and the crew of the other Mosquito combined to shoot down a Heinkel He 111 medium bomber and also had a half share in the probable destruction of another He 111 south of Bourges Airfield. Weather affected operations at night for several weeks but Kipp damaged a Messerschmitt Me 410 heavy fighter over an airfield at Münster-Handorf on 14 January.

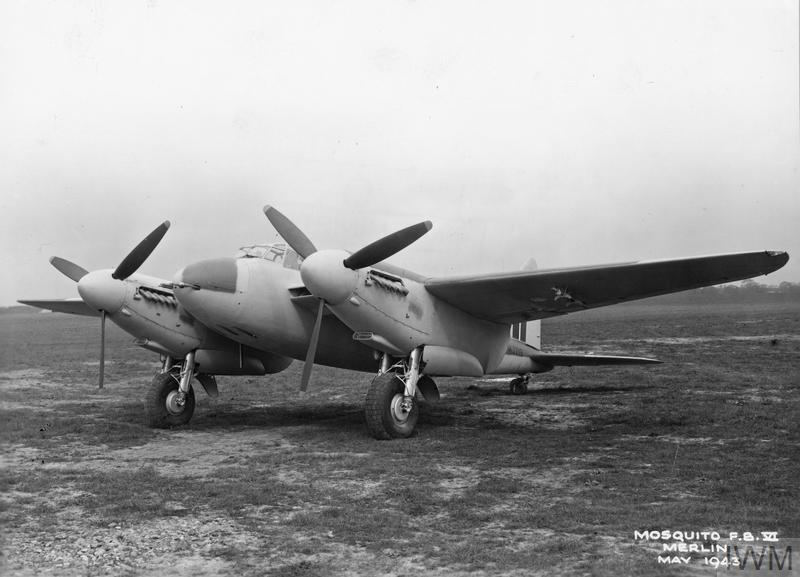
A de Havilland Mosquito of No. 418 Squadron, 1943

On the night of 18 February, Kipp and Huletsky destroyed two Me 410s that were returning to Juvincourt Airfield after having raided the United Kingdom. An unidentified aircraft on the ground was attacked and damaged on the night of 22 March. By this time Kipp had been promoted to squadron leader and was a flight commander in the squadron. On a sortie to Øresund, between German-occupied Denmark and Sweden, carried out on 14 April, Kipp and Huletsky were particularly successful, destroying two Junkers Ju 52 transport aircraft that had been adapted to a minesweeping role through the use of degaussing rings. Afterwards, the two Mosquitos involved in the sortie strafed an airfield at Kastrup, near Copenhagen, with Kipp destroying two Dornier Do 217 medium bombers on the ground. A third Do 217 on the ground was damaged.

Another successful sortie was carried on the night of 2 May, this time into the Bavarian region of Germany; a Focke-Wulf Fw 190 fighter was destroyed 15 miles (24 km) south of Ammersee and a second Fw 190 near Günzburg. Two more Fw 190s were destroyed over the town of Saarburg, while Kipp was flying back to the squadron's base in the United Kingdom. This intruder mission made Kipp and Huletsky the crew to have flown the single most successful sortie for the squadron and among the Fw 190s that they destroyed was the 100th aerial victory for No. 418 Squadron.

Kipp shot down a Heinkel He 177 heavy bomber on the night of 14 May over an airfield in France, the last nighttime aerial victory for a pilot of the squadron until after the Normandy landings. Towards the end of the month, Kipp's award of a Distinguished Flying Cross was announced in The London Gazette. (Note: Huletsky was also awarded the Distinguished Flying Cross; his award was announced in early June and the citation noted his contribution to the destruction of several aircraft.) The published citation read:

This officer has completed numerous sorties, most of them at night. He is a skilful and tenacious pilot whose determination to complete his mission successfully has been most commendable. On a recent occasion Squadron Leader Kipp flew one of a small formation of aircraft detailed for a mission far into enemy occupied territory. Success was achieved and by his careful planning and audacious tactics, Squadron Leader Kipp played a prominent part in the results obtained. He has destroyed three enemy aircraft, two of them in one sortie at night.

— London Gazette, No. 36531, 26 May 1944

After the invasion of Normandy, No. 418 Squadron patrolled over the landing beaches and inland, often attacking transportation infrastructure and airfields. On 14 June, while on another sortie to Denmark, Kipp and Huletsky combined to destroy a He 111. The pair was stood down from operations for a rest shortly afterwards. Early the following month, Kipp was awarded the Distinguished Service Order (DSO). (Note: In recognition of his efforts, Huletsky received a Bar to the DFC that he had been awarded two months previously.) The published citation for the DSO read:

This officer continues to display the highest standard of skill and gallantry in air operations. He has completed very many sorties and his careful planning, tactical ability and iron determination have brought him much success. In April 1944, he led a section of aircraft on a sortie over enemy territory during which four enemy aircraft were shot down, two of them by Squadron Leader Kipp. On another occasion, one night in May 1944, Squadron Leader Kipp destroyed four hostile aircraft in combat. His genius for leadership has always been apparent and his example has been most inspiring.

— London Gazette, No. 36598, 7 July 1944

=== Later war service ===
Kipp and Huletsky were posted to the headquarters of Air Defence of Great Britain at Bentley Priory for a few months before being transferred to RCAF Overseas Headquarters in London in September. At the end of the year, the pair returned to the RAF station at Ford with a posting to the Fighter Experimental Flight. This was a unit specialising in daytime 'Ranger' operations, making a number of test sorties. In the final months of the war in Europe, while flying Mosquitos on missions to strafe German airfields, they destroyed several aircraft on the ground in the Mühldorf and Kursheim areas: three Junkers Ju 88 medium bombers, a Messerschmitt Bf 110 heavy fighter, and a Fw 190. Six other aircraft, mostly of unidentified types, were also damaged in these attacks.

Kipp ended the war credited with having shot down ten German aircraft, with an eleventh shared with another pilot, and one shared as probably destroyed. He is also credited with damaging one aircraft and destroying seven aircraft on the ground.

== Later life ==
With the war over, Kipp was discharged from the RCAF in October 1945. However, he rejoined the service the following year as a squadron leader. In December 1948 he became commander of No. 410 Squadron, which had just become the first unit of the RCAF to be equipped with jet fighters, the de Havilland Vampire in this instance. On 25 July 1949, while performing low level aerobatics over the squadron's base at St. Hubert in Quebec, he lost control of his Vampire. He was killed when it crashed into the ground. Survived by his wife, he was buried in Kamloops Cemetery.
