= RCAF Station Yorkton =

- Near Yorkton, Saskatchewan in Canada

Site information
- Owner: Dept of National Defence
- Operator: Formerly Royal Canadian Air Force

Location
- Coordinates: 51°16′N 102°27′W

Site history
- Built: 1940
- In use: 1941-1945
- Fate: Yorkton Municipal Airport

Garrison information
- Past commanders: G/C George R. Howsam
- Garrison: No. 11 SFTS (1941-1944); No. 23 EFTS (1945)

Airfield information
- Identifiers: IATA: none, ICAO: none
- Elevation: 1,619 ft (493 m) AMSL
Runways
Direction	Length and surface
8/26	3,850 ft (1,170 m) hard surfaced
8/26	3,200 ft (980 m) hard surfaced
3/21	2,720 ft (830 m) hard surfaced
3/21	2,720 ft (830 m) hard surfaced
12/30	2,720 ft (830 m) hard surfaced
12/30	2,720 ft (830 m) hard surfaced
17/35	2,720 ft (830 m) hard surfaced
17/35	2,720 ft (830 m) hard surfaced

RCAF Station Yorkton was a Second World War air training station located near Yorkton, Saskatchewan, Canada.

== History ==
=== World War II ===
The Royal Canadian Air Force (RCAF), opened No. 11 Service Flying Training School (SFTS) at RCAF Station Yorkton on 10 April 1941. No. 11 SFTS was closed on 1 December 1944 and the following month No. 23 Elementary Flying Training School (EFTS) was relocated to Yorkton from RCAF Station Davidson on 29 January 1945. No. 23 EFTS was closed 15 August 1945. The schools and station were a component of the British Commonwealth Air Training Plan. The station was decommissioned shortly thereafter.

Construction of the station began in 1940. The facility was opened on June 11, 1941, and the first commander was Group Captain George R. Howsam. The school consisted of 40 buildings, including a mess hall, a 35-bed hospital, and hangars to shelter 200 planes.

=== Aerodrome information ===
The airfield was constructed in a typical BCATP wartime pattern, with six runways formed in an overlaid triangle. The aerodrome in Yorkton, however, had two additional runways running roughly north–south on the east side of the overlaid triangle.

In approximately 1942 the aerodrome was listed as RCAF Aerodrome - Yorkton, Saskatchewan at 51°16′N 102°27′W with a variation of 16 degrees east and elevation of 1,619 feet (493 m). Eight runways were listed as follows:

Runway name	Length	Width	Surface
8/26	3,850 ft (1,170 m)	100 ft (30 m)	Hard surfaced
8/26	3,200 ft (980 m)	100 ft (30 m)	Hard surfaced
3/21	2,720 ft (830 m)	100 ft (30 m)	Hard surfaced
3/21	2,720 ft (830 m)	100 ft (30 m)	Hard surfaced
12/30	3,000 ft (910 m)	100 ft (30 m)	Hard surfaced
12/30	3,300 ft (1,000 m)	100 ft (30 m)	Hard surfaced
17/35	2,600 ft (790 m)	150 ft (46 m)	Hard surfaced
17/35	2,160 ft (660 m)	100 ft (30 m)	Hard surfaced

=== Relief landing field – Sturdee ===
The primary Relief Landing Field (R1) for RCAF Station Yorkton was located approximately 6 miles south-east. The site was located approximately 1 mile south of the unincorporated community of Calley, Saskatchewan. The Relief field was laid out in the standard triangular pattern.

In approximately 1942 the aerodrome was listed as RCAF Aerodrome - Sturdee, Saskatchewan at 51°12′N 102°22′W with a variation of 16 degrees east and elevation of 1,665 feet (507 m). Three runways were listed as follows:

Runway name	Length	Width	Surface
1/19	2,700 ft (820 m)	100 ft (30 m)	Hard
13/31	2,700 ft (820 m)	100 ft (30 m)	Hard
7/25	2,700 ft (820 m)	100 ft (30 m)	Hard

=== Relief landing field – Rhein ===
The secondary Relief Landing Field (R2) for RCAF Station Yorkton was located approximately 12 miles north-east. The site was located approximately 3.5 miles south of the community of Rhein, Saskatchewan. The Relief field was turf with a triangular runway layout.

In approximately 1942 the aerodrome was listed as RCAF Aerodrome - Rhein, Saskatchewan at 51°18′N 102°10′W with a variation of 16 degrees east and elevation of 1,691 feet (515 m). Three runways were listed as follows:

Runway name	Length	Width	Surface
2/20	3,500 ft (1,100 m)	800 ft (240 m)	Turf
13/31	3,500 ft (1,100 m)	800 ft (240 m)	Turf
8/26	3,500 ft (1,100 m)	800 ft (240 m)	Turf

== See also ==
- Yorkton, Saskatchewan
- Yorkton Municipal Airport
