= Serra da Boa Vista (Minas Gerais) =

Mountain in Minas Gerais, Brazil

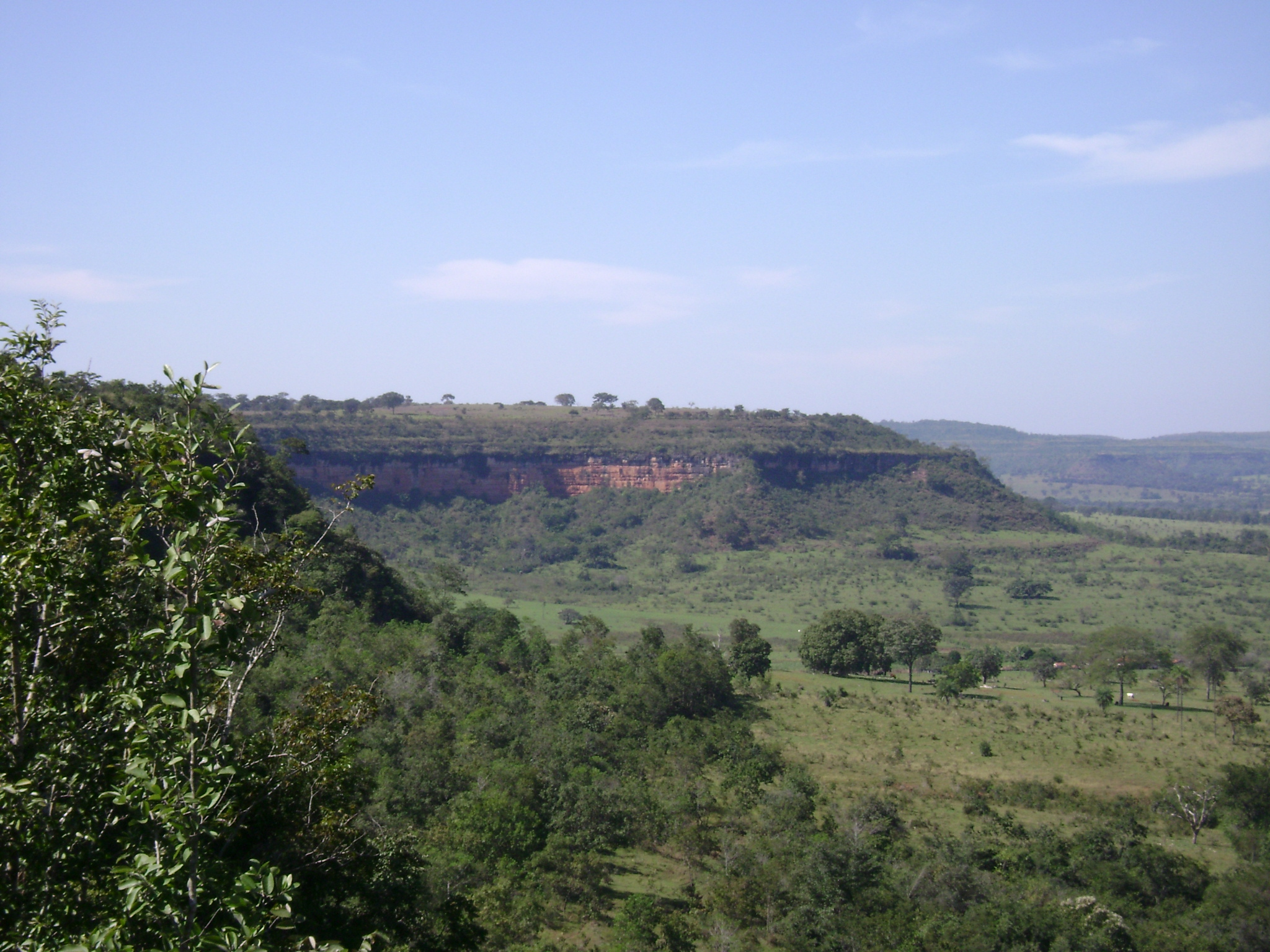
Boa Vista

The Serra da Boa Vista is a mountain situated approximately 40 km southwest of the town of Prata in the Brazilian state of Minas Gerais. It is on the edge of the BR-497 in the direction of Campina Verde.

The Serra de Boa Vista is an important archaeological site where fossils of sauropods have been found. Archaeological discoveries were first made more than 20 years ago on the site. The scientific name of the dinosaur was Maxakalisaurus topai. A resin replica, about 13 metres long and 9 metres high, has been on display in the National Museum in Rio de Janeiro since 28 August 2006.

Its rocks are composed of sandstones of the Adamantina Formation supported by more solid sandstones of the Marília Formation.
