= Picton Airport =

Former airfield in Picton, Ontario

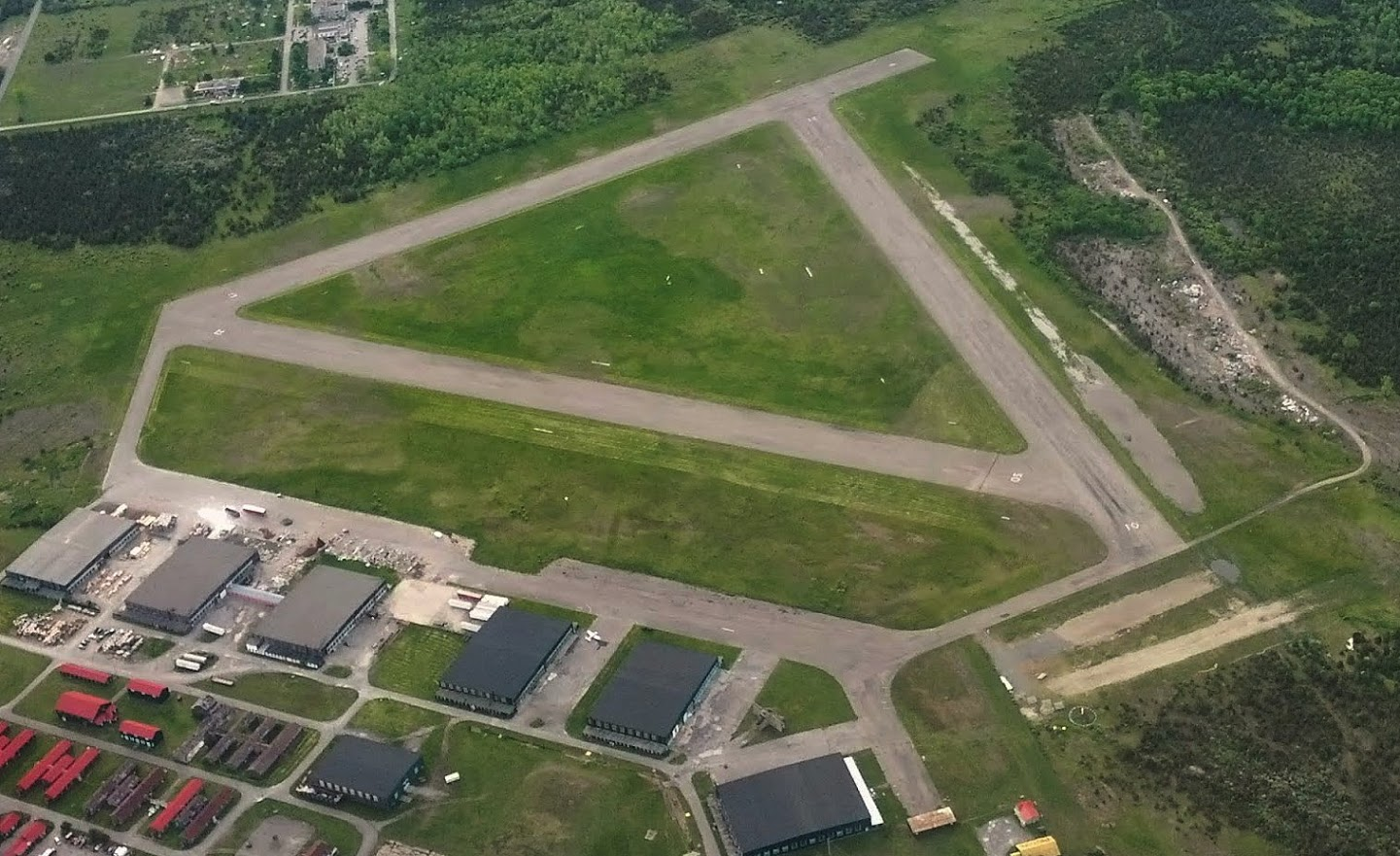
- Picton Airport (CNT7), Ontario, 28 May 2013
- IATA: none; ICAO: none; TC LID: CNT7

Summary
- Airport type: Closed
- Operator: PEC Community Partners
- Location: Picton, Ontario
- Time zone: EST (UTC−05:00)
  - Summer (DST): EDT (UTC−04:00)
- Elevation AMSL: 465 ft (142 m)
- Coordinates: 43°59′21″N 077°08′21″W

Map
- Location in Ontario CNT7 (Canada)

Runways
Direction	Length		Surface
Direction	ft	m	Surface
05/23	2,580	786	Asphalt
10/28	2,550	777	Asphalt
17/35	2,520	768	Asphalt
- Source: Canada Flight Supplement

Picton Airport is a decommissioned airport (formerly: (TC LID: CNT7)) which is located on the southeast side of Picton, Ontario, Canada, near the Bay of Quinte on Lake Ontario. The registered aerodrome was permanently closed in 2025.

Prior to its closure, the airport was used for general aviation, including glider flying. The runways have also been used for competitive, amateur automobile racing events such as ArmDrop drag races and autocross with the St Lawrence Automobile Club.

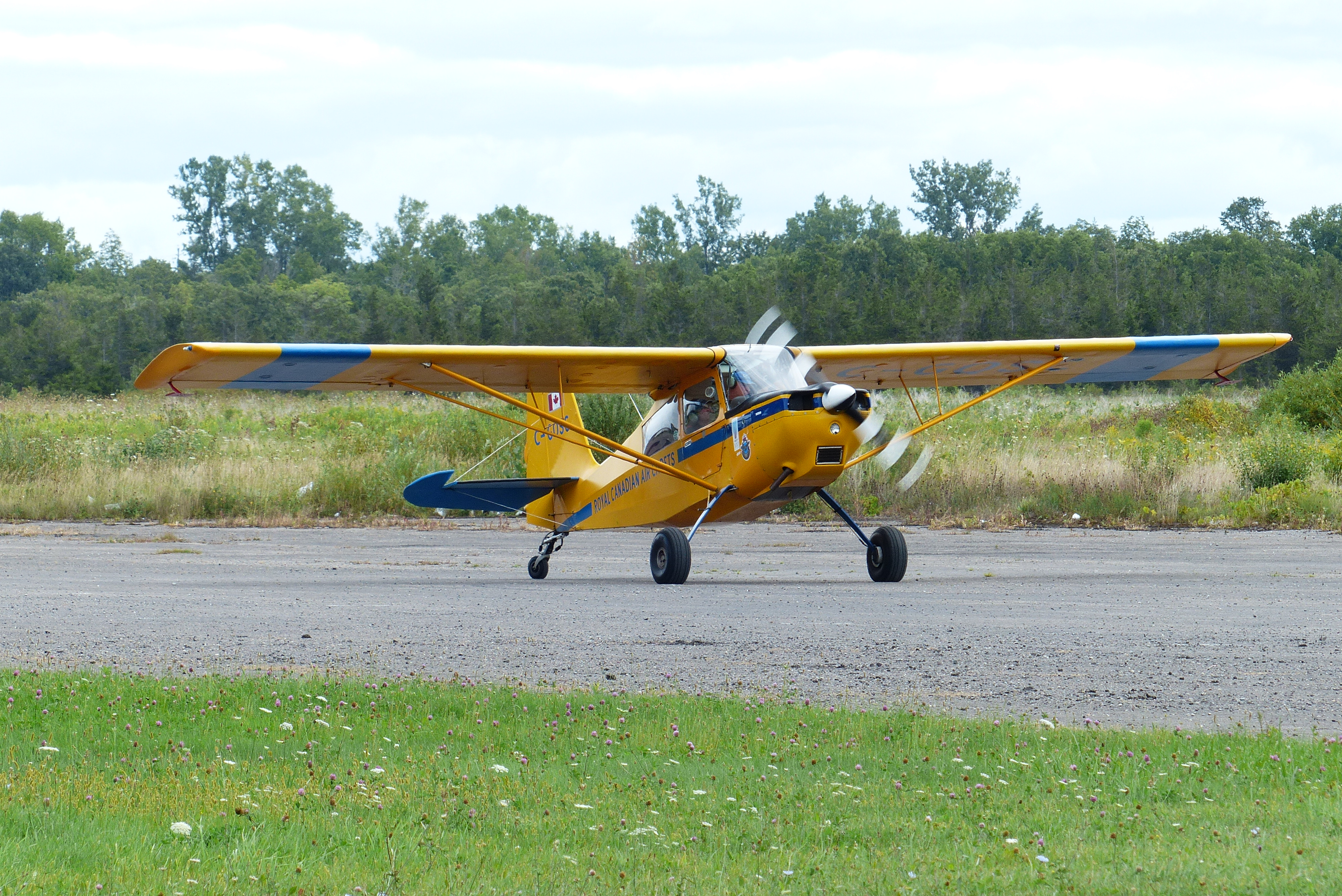
Royal Canadian Air Cadet glider tug at Picton

== Redevelopment ==
The site was sold in December 2021 to a group of investors with plans to redevelop the site while keeping and restoring the heritage buildings from the former air training base. It was re-branded as "Base31" and has begun hosting entertainment and cultural events on site.

== History ==
During World War II, the airport hosted the Royal Air Force No. 31 Bombing and Gunnery School for the British Commonwealth Air Training Plan, operating Avro Anson, Fairey Battle, Bristol Bolingbroke, and Westland Lysander aircraft. In 1953, the Prince Edward Flying club took over operation of the airport. The airport was known as CFB Picton. The airport was owned by Loch-Sloy Holdings Limited from 1970 until it was sold in 2022. During the summer it was home to the Air Cadet Gliding Program along with CFD Mountain View. The program is now run entirely out of CFD Mountain View. It was also used for motor-sport events such as autoslalom by the St. Lawrence Automobile Club. There were also regular ArmDrop drag racing events and tractor pulls were held here as well in 2010 and 2011. In 2005, the base served as the Driver Rehabilitation Centre for Canada's Worst Driver.

== See also ==
- List of British Commonwealth Air Training Plan facilities in Canada
