= CFB Picton =

Former Canadian military installation in Ontario

- Picton, Ontario in Canada

Site information
- Owner: Royal Canadian Air Force

Location
- Location in Ontario
- Coordinates: 43°59′30″N 77°08′30″W

Site history
- In use: April 1941–September 1969
- Fate: Now Operated as Picton Airport

Airfield information
- Elevation: 465 feet (142 m) AMSL
Runways
Direction	Length and surface
5/23	2,600 feet (792 m) Hard Surface
17/35	2,600 feet (792 m) Hard Surface
10/28	2,600 feet (792 m) Hard Surface

Canadian Forces Base Picton (CFB Picton) was a military installation located in Picton, Ontario. The base was active from the Second World War to 1969 and served the Royal Air Force, Royal Canadian Air Force and Canadian Army. Today, the site functions as Base31, a concert venue and cultural destination.

== Second World War ==
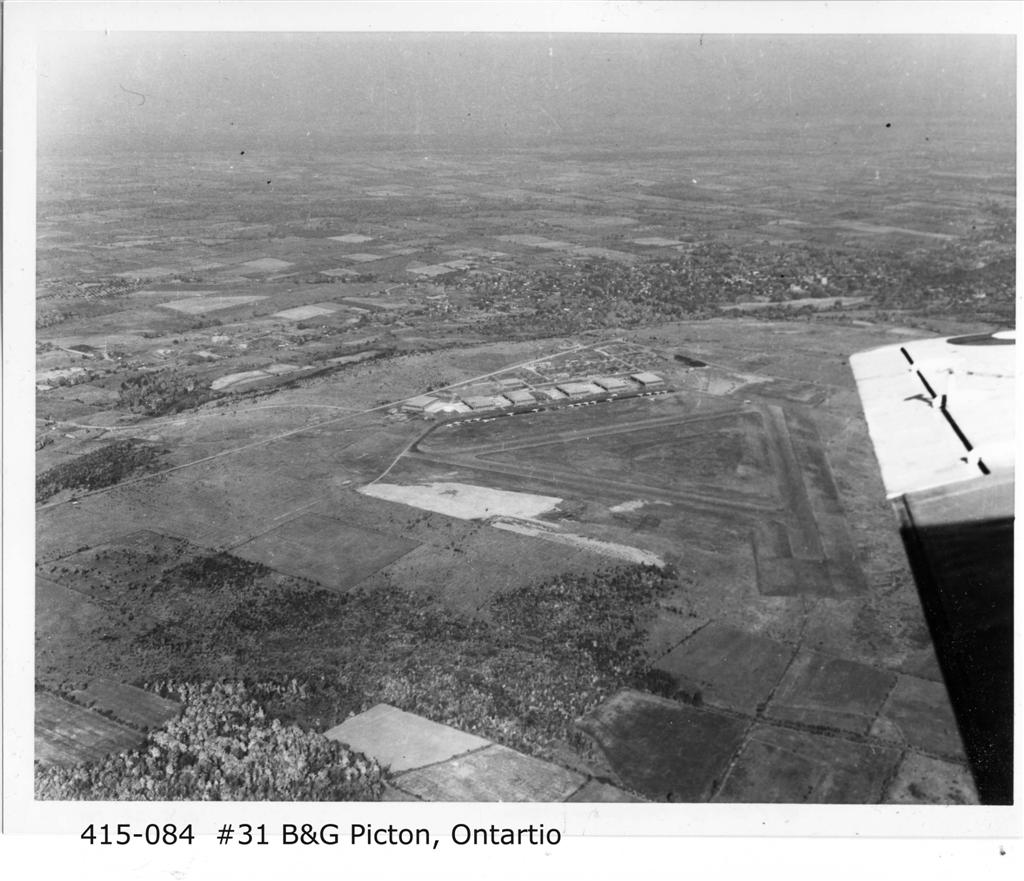
Royal Air Force No. 31 B & GS in World War II

The base at Picton originated as part of the British Commonwealth Air Training Plan. In November 1940 the Site was occupied by No. 1a Manning Depot. This school was formed on a temporary basis pending the arrival of the Royal Air Force's No 31 Bombing and Gunnery School. the Manning Depot was disbanded in March 1941. An airfield was built on a high plateau overlooking Picton and No. 31 Bombing and Gunnery School officially opened in April 1941. Five bombing ranges were also created to allow the students to practice. Aircraft flown at the base included the Avro Anson, Fairey Battle, Bristol Bolingbroke and Westland Lysander. The school offered six week courses in bombing, navigation and air gunnery until it was disbanded in November 1944, at which point the Royal Canadian Air Force established the No. 5 Reserve Equipment Maintenance Unit at Picton. This unit was responsible for aircraft storage and maintenance of the airfield itself. This unit operated until January 1946 when its functions were absorbed by a unit at RCAF Station Trenton.

=== Aerodrome information ===
In approximately 1942, the aerodrome was listed at 43°59′N 77°09′W with a Var. 11 degrees E and elevation of 465 feet (142 m). The aerodrome was listed with three runways as follows:

Runway Name	Length	Width	Surface
5/23	2,600 feet (792 m)	150 feet (46 m)	Hard Surfaced
17/35	2,600 feet (792 m)	150 feet (46 m)	Hard Surfaced
10/28	2,600 feet (792 m)	150 feet (46 m)	Hard Surfaced

== Canadian Army ==
After the departure of the maintenance unit, most of the base was taken over by the army for use as the Royal Canadian School of Artillery (Anti-Aircraft) (RCSA(A.A.)). The school provided training for anti-aircraft gunners, gunnery radar operators, technical assistants and artillery instructors. A number of operational artillery units were also located in Picton, including the 127th and 128th Medium AA Batteries, Royal Canadian Artillery (RCA) and the 2nd and 3rd Light AA Batteries of the 1st Light Anti-Aircraft Regiment, RCA. The RCAF also maintained a small detachment at the base to provide aircraft targets for the gunners. In July 1960, the base was officially renamed Camp Picton and the RCSA (A.A.) disbanded a few weeks later. Two new units were formed later that year, namely the 1st Surface-to-Surface Missile (SSM) Battery and the 2nd SSM (Training) Battery of The Royal Regiment of Canadian Artillery. Both units were transferred; the 1st went to Europe in December 1961 to be equipped with Honest John rockets and the 2nd was transferred to Camp Shilo in 1962. The 1st Battalion of the Canadian Guards then transferred to Camp Picton from their previous base in Germany. With the unification of the Army, RCAF and Royal Canadian Navy to create the Canadian Forces, Camp Picton was renamed Canadian Forces Base Picton. However, reductions in the Canadian military meant that the base was no longer required and CFB Picton was closed in September 1969.

== Affiliated facilities ==
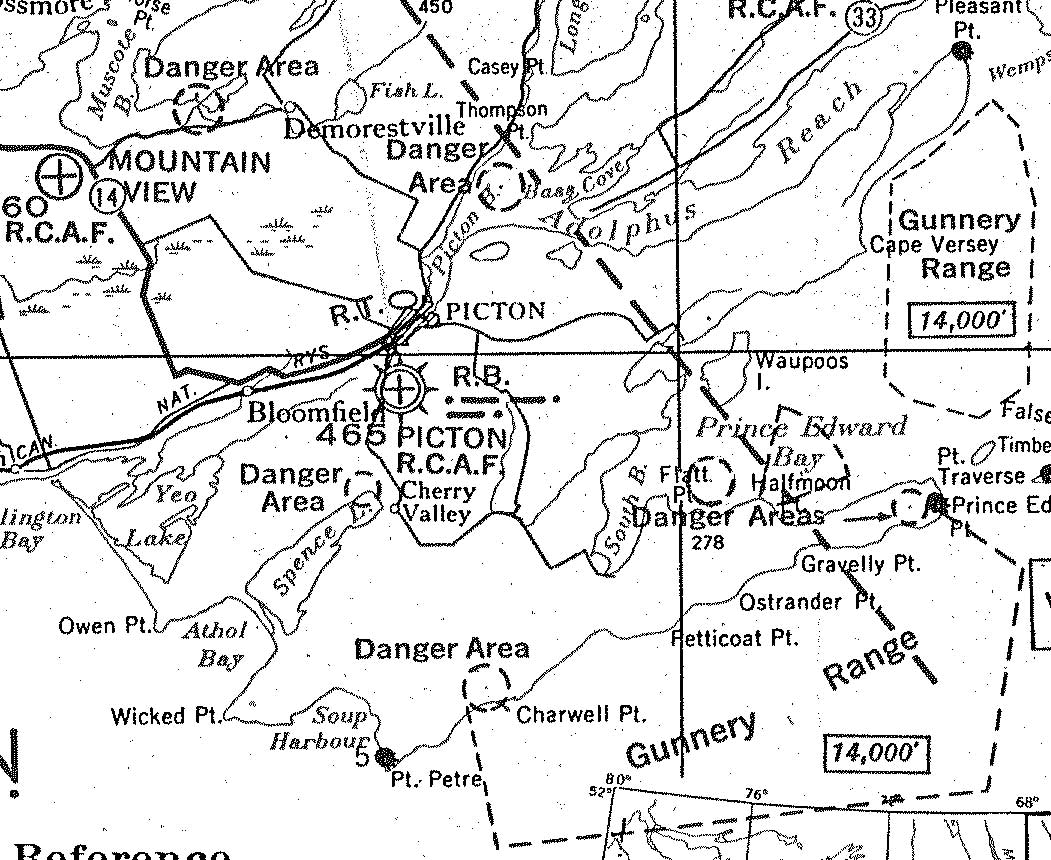
1943 air navigation chart showing Picton area

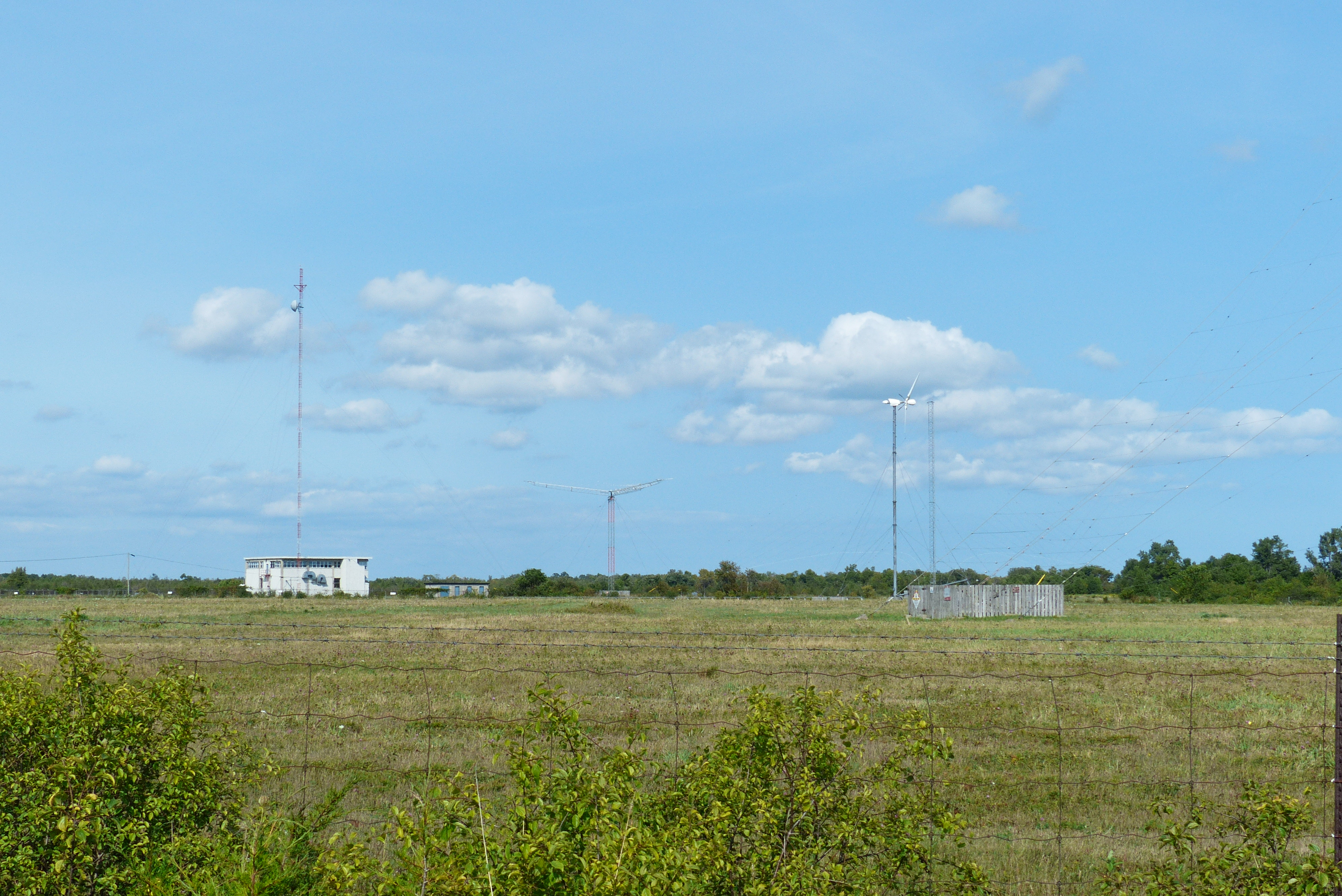
Transmitter site at Point Petre

The Bombing & Gunnery School and Artillery School also operated a number of ranges in other parts of Prince Edward County. The Point Petre and South Bay Training Areas were located in the southeast corner of the county near Cherry Valley. Point Petre had been in use as an artillery range since 1938 and the area continued in that role with the formation of the RCSA. Sections of the site were also used for test firing of the Velvet Glove air-to-air missile. The South Bay Training Area was used for mortar, recoilless rifle and anti-tank rocket training. In 2015, Point Petre is a Provincial Wildlife Area. A transmitter site for the Military Aeronautical Communications System based at CFB Trenton is also located there.

== After closure ==
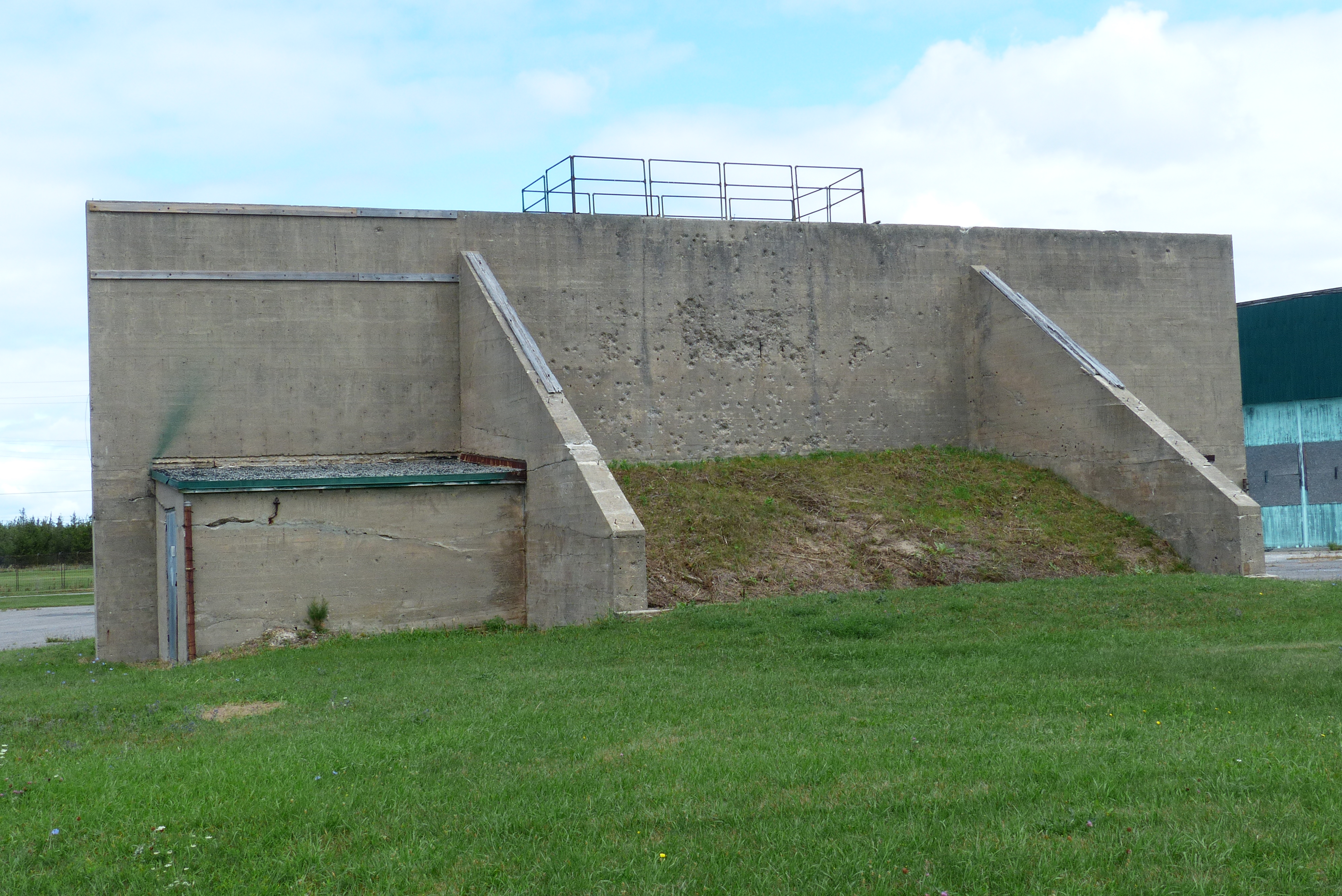
Backstop of the 25 yard gunnery range in 2015

After CFB Picton was closed, much of the base housing was sold to the Government of Ontario. Originally run by the Ministry of Health, it was later transferred to the Ministry of Community and Social Services and was named Prince Edward Heights. The "Heights" as it was known locally, at its peak, was home to approximately 450 individuals with developmental disabilities and employed just as many staff, until deinstitutionalization became the norm and it closed in September 1999. A developer has since purchased the homes, renamed the development "Macaulay Village" and resold them as individual properties. Much of the main base also remains, with some of the original buildings in use for assorted industrial and institutional purposes. The airfield is no longer operational. The base and Point Petre were also used to film Dieppe (1993), a TV movie by Canadian Broadcasting Corporation (CBC). The site was purchased in 2021 and is now known as cultural destination Base31.
