= HMCS Quatsino =

Minesweeper during WWII

History

Canada
- Name: Quatsino
- Namesake: Quatsino Sound, British Columbia
- Builder: Prince Rupert Dry Dock and Shipyards Co. Prince Rupert, British Columbia
- Laid down: 20 June 1940
- Launched: 9 January 1941
- Commissioned: 3 November 1941
- Decommissioned: 26 November 1945
- Identification: Pennant number: J152
- Fate: Sold 1947 for mercantile conversion

General characteristics
- Class & type: Bangor-class minesweeper
- Displacement: 672 long tons (683 t)
- Length: 180 ft (54.9 m) oa
- Beam: 28 ft 6 in (8.7 m)
- Draught: 9 ft 9 in (3.0 m)
- Propulsion: 2 Admiralty 3-drum water tube boilers, 2 shafts, vertical triple-expansion reciprocating engines, 2,400 ihp (1,790 kW)
- Speed: 16.5 knots (31 km/h)
- Complement: 83
- Armament: 1 × QF 4 in (102 mm)/40 cal Mk IV gun; 1 × QF 2-pounder Mark VIII; 2 × QF 20 mm Oerlikon guns; 40 depth charges as escort

HMCS Quatsino (pennant J152) was a Bangor-class minesweeper constructed for the Royal Canadian Navy during the Second World War. Entering service in 1941, the minesweeper spent the entire war on the West Coast of Canada. Following the war, the vessel was sold for mercantile conversion in 1947 and renamed Chen Hsin. In 1950 the merchant ship was sold and renamed Concord before being broken up for scrap in 1951.

== Design and description ==
A British design, the Bangor-class minesweepers were smaller than the preceding Halcyon-class minesweepers in British service, but larger than the Fundy class in Canadian service. They came in two versions powered by different engines; those with a diesel engines and those with vertical triple-expansion steam engines. Quatsino was of the latter design and was larger than her diesel-engined cousins. Quatsino was 180 feet (54.9 m) long overall, had a beam of 28 feet 6 inches (8.7 m) and a draught of 9 feet 9 inches (3.0 m). The minesweeper had a displacement of 672 long tons (683 t). She had a complement of 6 officers and 77 enlisted.

Quatsino had two vertical triple-expansion steam engines, each driving one shaft, using steam provided by two Admiralty three-drum boilers. The engines produced a total of 2,400 indicated horsepower (1,800 kW) and gave a maximum speed of 16.5 knots (30.6 km/h; 19.0 mph). The minesweeper could carry a maximum of 150 long tons (152 t) of fuel oil.

Quatsino was armed with a single quick-firing (QF) 4-inch (102 mm)/40 caliber Mk IV gun mounted forward. (Note: The 40 caliber denotes the length of the gun. This means that the length of the gun barrel is 40 times the bore diameter.) For anti-aircraft purposes, the minesweeper was equipped with one QF 2-pounder Mark VIII and two single-mounted QF 20 mm Oerlikon guns. As a convoy escort, Quatsino was deployed with 40 depth charges launched from two depth charge throwers and four chutes.

== Operational history ==
The minesweeper was ordered as part of the 1939–40 building programme. The ship's keel was laid down on 20 June 1940 by Prince Rupert Dry Dock and Shipyards Co. at their yard in Prince Rupert, British Columbia. Named for Quatsino Sound in British Columbia, Quatsino was launched on 9 January 1941 and commissioned into the Royal Canadian Navy at Prince Rupert on 3 November 1941.

Quatsino spent the entirety of the Second World War on the West Coast of Canada. Assigned to the patrol units Esquimalt Force (operating out of Esquimalt, British Columbia) or Prince Rupert Force (operating out of Prince Rupert), the main duty of Bangor-class minesweepers after commissioning on the West Coast was to perform the Western Patrol. This consisted of patrolling the west coast of Vancouver Island, inspecting inlets and sounds and past the Scott Islands to Gordon Channel at the entrance to the Queen Charlotte Strait and back.

On 8 July 1942, a Royal Canadian Air Force Bristol Bolingbroke maritime patrol aircraft of No. 115 Squadron reported that it had bombed and damaged an Imperial Japanese Navy submarine at 55°20′N 134°41′W. Quatsino rendezvoused with the United States Coast Guard cutter USCGC McLane and the U.S. Coast Guard-manned United States Navy patrol vessel USS YP-251 on 9 July 1942, and the three ships began a search for the submarine in Dixon Entrance southeast of Annette Island in Southeast Alaska, but Quatsino did not take part in an anti-submarine action later that day in which McLane and YP-251 received credit for sinking a submarine in the Pacific Ocean off Southeast Alaska.

Following the war Quatsino was paid off on 26 November 1945 at Esquimalt. The vessel was sold for mercantile conversion in 1947 and renamed Chen Hsin. Registered in Shanghai the 653 GRT vessel was owned by Chung Yuan SN Co. The vessel was sold in 1950 to Transcontinental Corporation, registered in Monrovia and renamed Concord. The merchant ship was broken up in Hong Kong beginning on 13 January 1951.
