= Mountain View, Ontario =

Coordinates: 44.083°N 77.367°W

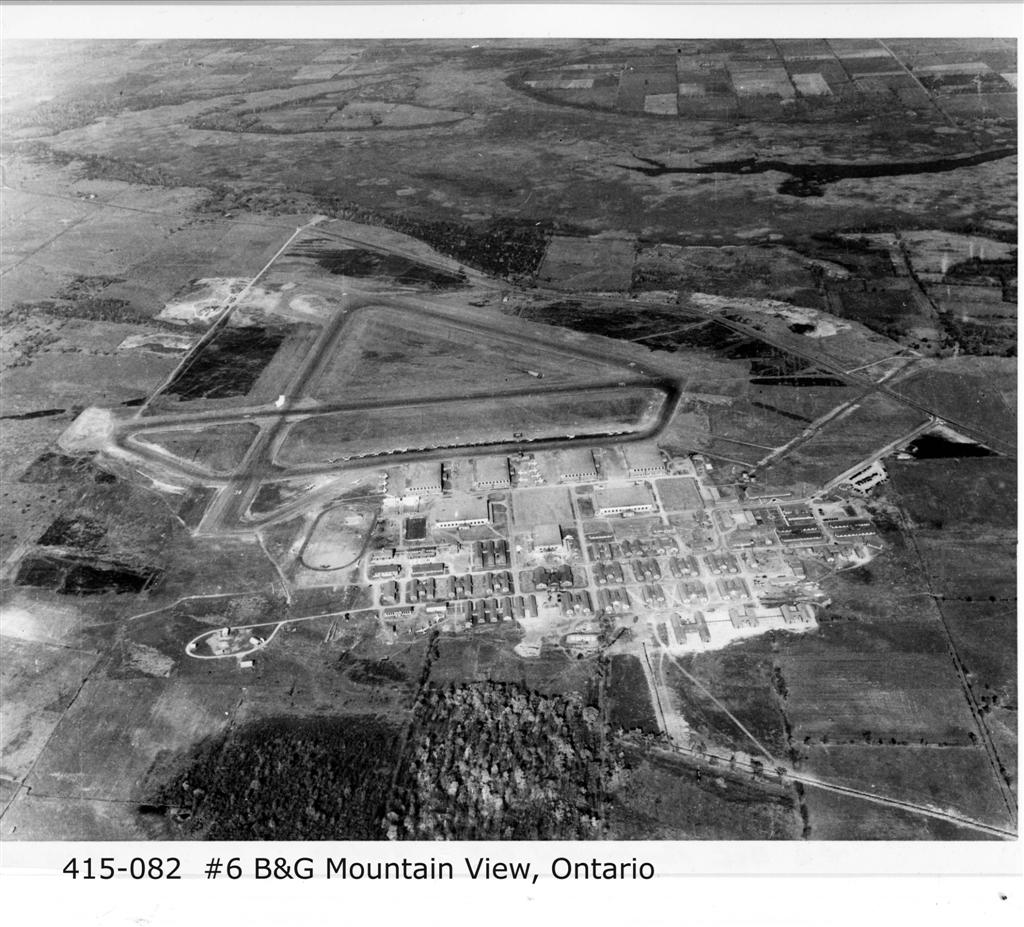
Airfield at Canadian Forces Detachment Mountain view as it looked during World War II

Mountain View is a small community located in Prince Edward County, Ontario located south of Belleville. Mountain View is the location of a former British Commonwealth Air Training Plan air station which is now known as Canadian Forces Detachment Mountain View (CFD Mountain View), a detachment of CFB Trenton.

== See also ==
- CFD Mountain View
- Trenton/Mountain View Airport
