= Japanese submarine Ro-32 =

Imperial Japanese Navy Kaichu-Type submarine

History

Japan
- Name: Submarine No. 71
- Builder: Kawasaki, Kobe, Japan
- Laid down: 24 October 1921
- Launched: 19 March 1923
- Completed: 31 May 1924
- Commissioned: 31 May 1924
- Renamed: Ro-32 on 1 November 1924
- Decommissioned: 15 December 1938
- Stricken: 1 April 1942
- Fate: Hulked 1 April 1942; Scrapped ca. August 1945

General characteristics
- Class & type: Kaichū type submarine (K5 subclass)
- Displacement: 866 tonnes (852 long tons) surfaced; 1,047 tonnes (1,030 long tons) submerged
- Length: 74.22 m (243 ft 6 in) overall
- Beam: 6.12 m (20 ft 1 in)
- Draft: 3.73 m (12 ft 3 in)
- Installed power: 1,200 bhp (890 kW) (diesel); 1,200 hp (890 kW) (electric motor)
- Propulsion: Diesel-electric; 2 × Sulzer Mark I diesel engine, 143 tons fuel; 2 × electric motor
- Speed: 13 knots (24 km/h; 15 mph) surfaced; 8.5 knots (15.7 km/h; 9.8 mph) submerged
- Range: 9,000 nmi (17,000 km; 10,000 mi) at 10 knots (19 km/h; 12 mph) surfaced; 85 nmi (157 km; 98 mi) at 4 knots (7.4 km/h; 4.6 mph) submerged
- Test depth: 45.7 m (150 ft)
- Crew: 44
- Armament: 4 × bow 533 mm (21 in) torpedo tubes; 1 × 120 mm (4.7 in) gun; 1 × 6.5 mm machine gun

Ro-32, originally named Submarine No. 71, was an Imperial Japanese Navy Kaichu-Type submarine of the Kaichu V (Toku Chu) subclass. She was in commission from 1924 to 1938, seeing service in the waters of Formosa and Japan, then served as a stationary training hulk during World War II.

== Design and description ==
The submarines of the Kaichu V sub-class were designed for anti-shipping operations and carried more fuel and had greater range and a heavier gun armament than preceding Kaichu-type submarines. They displaced 866 tonnes (852 long tons) surfaced and 1,036 tonnes (1,020 long tons) submerged. The submarines were 74.22 meters (243 ft 6 in) long and had a beam of 6.12 meters (20 ft 1 in) and a draft of 3.73 meters (12 ft 3 in). They had a diving depth of 45.7 meters (150 ft).

For surface running, the submarines were powered by two 600-brake-horsepower (447 kW) Sulzer diesel engines, each driving one propeller shaft. When submerged each propeller was driven by a 600-horsepower (447 kW) electric motor. They could reach 13 knots (24 km/h; 15 mph) on the surface and 8.5 knots (15.7 km/h; 9.8 mph) underwater. On the surface, they had a range of 9,000 nautical miles (17,000 km; 10,000 mi) — although the Imperial Japanese Navy officially announced it as 6,000 nautical miles (11,000 km; 6,900 mi) — at 10 knots (19 km/h; 12 mph); submerged, they had a range of 85 nmi (157 km; 98 mi) at 4 knots (7.4 km/h; 4.6 mph).

The submarines were armed with four internal bow 533 mm (21.0 in) torpedo tubes and carried a total of eight torpedoes. They were also armed with a single 120 mm (4.7 in) deck gun and one 6.5 mm machine gun.

== Construction and commissioning ==
Ro-32 was laid down as Submarine No. 71 on 24 October 1921 by Kawasaki at Kobe, Japan. Launched on 19 March 1923, she was completed and commissioned on 31 May 1924.

== Service history ==
Upon commissioning, Submarine No. 71 was attached to the Sasebo Naval District, to which she remained attached throughout her active career. On 15 June 1924, she was assigned to both Submarine Division 25 — in which she spent her active career — and the Mako Defense Division headquartered at Mako in the Pescadores Islands. She was renamed Ro-32 on 1 November 1924. On 1 December 1926, she was reassigned to the Sasebo Defense Division, headquartered at Sasebo, Japan. Her service in the Sasebo Defense Division ended on 15 November 1934, after which she served as a unit of Submarine Division 25 in the Sasebo Naval District.

Ro-32 was decommissioned and placed in the Fourth Reserve on 15 December 1938. The Japanese struck her from the Navy list on 1 April 1942, and that day she became a stationary training hulk at the submarine school at Ōtake, Japan. She was scrapped ca. August 1945.

During World War II, the United States Coast Guard cutter USCGC McLane (WSC-146), the Coast Guard-crewed United States Navy patrol vessel USS YP-251, and a Royal Canadian Air Force Bristol Bolingbroke maritime patrol aircraft of No. 115 Squadron shared credit for the sinking of a submarine in the Pacific Ocean off Southeast Alaska at 55°20′N 134°40′W on 9 July 1942, and in 1947 the Joint Army-Navy Assessment Committee identified the sunken submarine as Ro-32. In 1967, the U.S. Navy retracted that finding after determining that Ro-32 had been inactive in Japan at the time of the sinking and had remained afloat through the end of World War II. (Note: The identity of the submarine reportedly sunk on 9 July 1942 remains undetermined. One hypothesis is that she was the Soviet Navy submarine Shch-138, which the Soviet Navy reported missing on 10 July 1942, the day following the sinking. The Soviet Union later claimed that Shch-138 sank in the harbor at Nikolayevsk-on-Amur on the Amur River in the Soviet Union on 18 July 1942 after the explosion of four of her torpedoes, was refloated immediately, sank again the following the day during a storm while under tow, and finally was refloated a second time on 11 July 1943 and scrapped. A photo of the submarine reportedly taken by the crew of the Bolingbroke involved in her sinking purportedly shows a gray submarine — submarines of the Soviet Pacific Ocean Fleet were painted gray during World War II, while Japanese submarines were black — and the number "8" among characters painted on her conning tower, consistent with the markings on Shch-138′s conning tower. Some researchers have suggested that the Soviet narrative of Shch-138′s loss at Nikolayevsk-on-Amur may be intended to cover up Shch-138′s loss while clandestinely collecting information along the coast of the United States and Canada. (See Bruhn, p. 128.))
