= CRGS =

CRGS may stand for:

- Central Region Gliding School, a flight training program for young adults in Canada
- Cleveland Regional Geodetic Survey, a map projection used in Northeast Ohio
- Clitheroe Royal Grammar School, a grammar school in Lancashire, England
- Colchester Royal Grammar School, a grammar school in Essex, England
