= YP-251 (Patrol Craft) =

U.S. Navy World War II vessel

History

United States
- Name: MV Foremost
- Operator: Private owners
- Builder: Marine Ways, Seattle, Washington
- Completed: 1924
- Fate: Sold to U.S. Navy, 11 December 1941

United States Navy
- Name: YP-251
- Acquired: 11 December 1941
- In service: 31 December 1941
- Stricken: 24 October 1945
- Honors and awards: American Campaign Medal; World War II Victory Medal
- Fate: Transferred to War Shipping Administration, 18 March 1946

United States
- Name: MV Foremost
- Operator: Private owners
- In service: 1946
- Renamed: MV Le Roy 1954
- Fate: Extant 1957

General characteristics as U.S. Navy patrol vessel
- Type: Patrol vessel
- Tonnage: 82 gross register tons; 66 net tons
- Length: 79 ft 8 in (24.28 m)
- Beam: 18 ft 5 in (5.61 m)
- Draft: 8 ft (2.44 m)
- Propulsion: One diesel engine, 165 shp (123 kW), one shaft

YP-251 was a converted fishing vessel which served in the U.S. Navy during World War II from 1941 to 1945. She operated in the waters of the Territory of Alaska during the war. Before the war, she operated as the commercial fishing vessel MV Foremost from 1924 to 1941. After the war, she again operated as the commercial vessel MV Foremost from 1946 to 1954, then was renamed MV LeRoy.

== Pre-World War II commercial service ==
MV Foremost was constructed in 1924 by Marine Ways at Seattle, Washington, for Andrew Peterson for use as halibut-fishing vessel. and was assigned the official number 223964. Sometime around 1939, she was registered to Marcus Ness of Ketchikan, Territory of Alaska.

== U.S. Navy service ==
On 11 December 1941, the United States Navy acquired Foremost for World War II service as a yard patrol boat. After her conversion into a patrol vessel, she was placed in service on 31 December 1941 as YP-251. Assigned to the 17th Naval District, Northwestern Sea Frontier, and Alaskan Sea Frontier, she carried out patrol duties in Alaskan waters for the remainder of World War II, based at Ketchikan. She was crewed by United States Coast Guard personnel throughout her naval service.

On 8 July 1942, a Royal Canadian Air Force Bristol Bolingbroke maritime patrol aircraft of No. 115 Squadron reported that it had bombed and damaged a submarine at 55°20′N 134°41′W. The U.S. Coast Guard cutter USCGC McLane (WSC-146) and the Royal Canadian Navy minesweeper HMCS Quatsino joined YP-251 on 9 July 1942, and the three ships began a search for the submarine in Dixon Entrance southeast of Annette Island in Southeast Alaska. McLane reported that she gained sound contact on a submarine at 0800, but then lost it, and a depth charge she dropped set to explode at a depth of 300 feet (91 m) failed to detonate. McLane regained sound contact at 0905 and chased the submarine for an hour, reporting that the submarine zigzagged and ran at short intervals to try to evade her, and after an hour she again lost contact. McLane regained sound contact at 1540, and at 1553 dropped two depth charges, one set to explode at 150 feet (46 m) and the other at 250 feet (76 m), and then two more at 1556, set to explode at 200 feet (61 m) and 300 feet (91 m). McLane and YP-251 reported that bubbles rose to the surface. The vessels reported that a torpedo passed ahead of McLane and only 28 yards (26 m) astern of YP-251 at 1735, leaving a 125-foot (38 m) feather that indicated the submarine's firing position, which McLane turned toward. YP-251 reported that she sighted a periscope and dropped a depth charge over the spot where the periscope submerged, and McLane followed up that attack with two depth charges of her own. McLane then attempted to regain sonar contact on the submarine. The vessels reported that an oil slick rose to the surface, and at 1935 YP-251 reported sighting a periscope, dropped a depth charge, and struck a submerged object, which she rode over. McLane then dropped two depth charges, after which the vessels reported that oil, bubbles, and what appeared to be rock wool (used to deaden sounds in submarines) rose to the surface. McLane continued to search the area for any sign of the submarine until early on the morning of 10 July 1942, but found none. YP-251, McLane, and the Bolingbroke aircraft received shared credit for sinking the submarine at 55°20′N 134°40′W. The commanding officers of the two vessels — Lieutenant Neils P. Thomsen, USCG, of YP-251 and Lieutenant Ralph Burns, USCG, of McLane — received the Legion of Merit for the action, and in 1947 the Joint Army-Navy Assessment Committee identified the sunken submarine as the Japanese submarine Ro-32. In 1967, however, the U.S. Navy retracted that assessment after determining that Ro-32 had been inactive in Japan at the time of the sinking and had remained afloat through the end of World War II, and the identity of the submarine reportedly sunk on 9 July 1942 remains undetermined. (Note: One hypothesis about the identity of the submarine reportedly sunk on 9 July 1942 is that she was the Soviet Navy submarine Shch-138, which the Soviet Navy reported missing on 10 July 1942, the day following the sinking. The Soviet Union later claimed that Shch-138 sank in the harbor at Nikolayevsk-on-Amur on the Amur River in the Soviet Union on 18 July 1942 after the explosion of four of her torpedoes, was refloated immediately, sank again the following the day during a storm while under tow, and finally was refloated a second time on 11 July 1943 and scrapped. A photo of the submarine reportedly taken by the crew of the Bolingbroke involved in her sinking purportedly shows a gray submarine — submarines of the Soviet Pacific Ocean Fleet were painted gray during World War II, while Japanese submarines were black — and the number "8" among characters painted on her conning tower, consistent with the markings on Shch-138′s conning tower. Some researchers have suggested that the Soviet narrative of Shch-138′s loss at Nikolayevsk-on-Amur may be intended to cover up Shch-138′s loss while clandestinely collecting information along the coast of the United States and Canada. (See Bruhn, p. 128.))

After the conclusion of World War II in August 1945, YP-251 was stricken from the Naval Vessel Register on 24 October 1945. The U.S. Navy transferred her to the War Shipping Administration on 18 March 1946 for disposal.

== Post-World War II commercial service ==
In 1946, Robert Prothero registered the vessel at Seattle under her former name, MV Foremost. She was registered to Manson F. Backus, executor of estate of LeRoy M. Backus, at Seattle in 1950. Renamed MV Le Roy in 1954, she was sold to Alvin Osterback of Sand Point, Alaska, in 1957.

== Awards ==
SOURCES

- American Campaign Medal
- World War II Victory Medal
