= USCGC McLane =

Former United States Coast Guard cutter

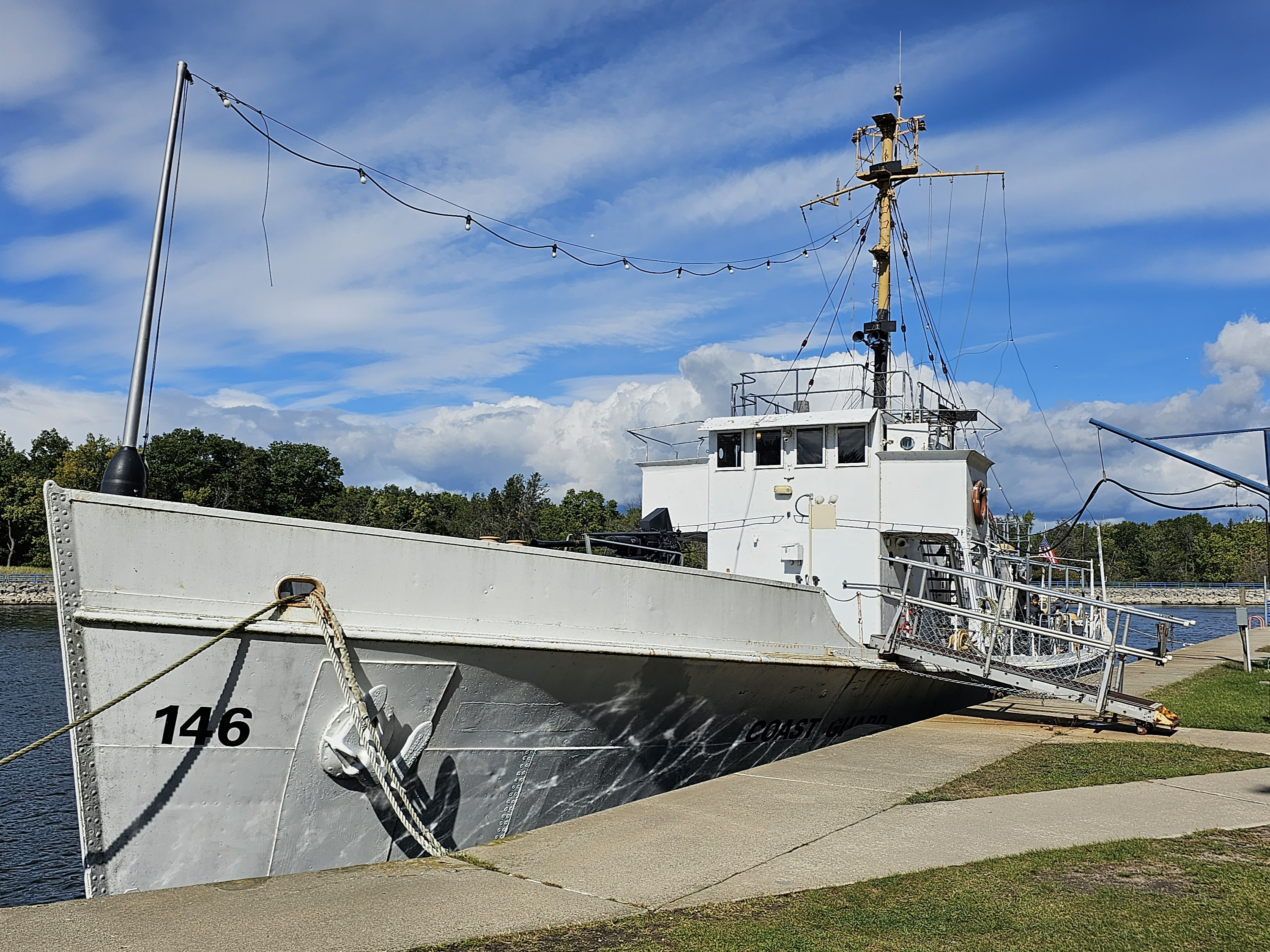
- McLane in 2023, at the USS Silversides Submarine Museum.

History

United States
- Name: USCGC McLane
- Namesake: Louis McLane
- Operator: U.S. Coast Guard; (1927-1941); (1946-1968); U.S. Navy; (1941-1946); Sea Scouts; (1968-1993); Great Lakes Naval Memorial and Museum; (1993-present)
- Builder: American Brown Boveri Electric Corporation, Camden, New Jersey
- Cost: US$63,163
- Launched: 22 March 1927
- Commissioned: 6 April 1927
- Decommissioned: 31 December 1968
- Identification: Pennant number: WSC/WMEC-146
- Honors and awards: American Defense Service Medal; American Campaign Medal; Asiatic-Pacific Campaign Medal with battle star; World War II Victory Medal; National Defense Service Medal with star
- Fate: Donated to Great Lakes Naval Memorial and Museum, later sold for scrap. Scrapping completed in January 2026.

General characteristics
- Class & type: Active-class patrol boat
- Displacement: 232 tons (trial)
- Length: 125 ft (38 m)
- Beam: 23 ft 6 in (7.16 m)
- Draft: 7 ft 6 in (2.29 m)
- Installed power: After 1938 re-engining: 1,200 brake horsepower (0.9 megawatt)
- Propulsion: As built: Two 6-cylinder 300 brake horsepower diesel engines; After 1938 re-engining: Two 800 brake horsepower General Motors diesel engines
- Speed: As built: 10 knots; In 1945: 12 knots (maximum); 7 knots (economical)
- Range: In 1945: 2,900 nautical miles (5,370 kilometers) at 10 knots; 4,000 nautical miles (7,400 kilometers) at 7 knots
- Complement: 20 (3 officers, 17 enlisted men) (1930); 46 (5 officers, 41 men) (1945)
- Sensors & processing systems: Sonar (1945) QCO-1; Detection radar (1960) SPS-23
- Armament: In 1927: 1 x 3-inch (76.2-millimeter) 23-caliber gun; In 1941: 2 x depth charge tracks; In 1945: 1 x 3-inch (76.2-mm) 23-caliber gun, 2 x single 20-mm 80-caliber gun mounts, 2 x depth charge tracks, 2 x Mousetraps; In 1960: 1 x single 40-mm 60-caliber antiaircraft gun mount
- Aircraft carried: None
- Aviation facilities: None
- U.S.C.G.C. McLane
- U.S. National Register of Historic Places
- U.S. National Historic Landmark
- Location within Michigan
- Location: Muskegon, Michigan
- Coordinates: 43.2304759°N 86.3319947°W
- Built: 1941
- NRHP reference No.: 72000453
- Added to NRHP: 18 October 1972

USCGC McLane (WSC-146) was a 125 ft (38 m) United States Coast Guard Active-class patrol boat in commission from 1927 to 1971. She was named for Louis McLane, (1786–1857) who was appointed in 1833 as United States Secretary of State. In May 1966, she was redesignated as (WMEC-146).

== Development and design ==
Alert-class ships were designed for trailing "mother ships" along the outer line of patrol during Prohibition. They were constructed at a cost of $63,173 each. They gained a reputation for durability that was only enhanced by their re-engining in the late 1930s; their original 6-cylinder diesel engines were replaced by significantly more powerful 8-cylinder units that used the original engine beds and gave the vessels an additional 3 knots (5.6 km/h; 3.5 mph) of speed. All served in World War II and two, Jackson and Bedloe, were lost during the war in the 1944 Great Atlantic hurricane. Ten were refitted as buoy tenders during the war and reverted to patrol work afterward.

Originally designated WPC, for patrol craft, they were re-designated WSC, for submarine chaser, in February 1942, during World War II. The "W" appended to the PC (patrol craft) and SC (submarine chaser) designations identified vessels as belonging to the U.S. Coast Guard. Those remaining in service in May 1966 were reclassified as medium endurance cutters (WMEC).

== Construction and commissioning ==
McLane was laid down and launched by American Brown Boveri Electric Corporation, Camden on 22 March 1927. She was commissioned on 6 April 1927.

== Service history ==
When the United States entered World War II in December 1941, operational control of U.S. Coast Guard ships, including McLane, was transferred from the United States Department of the Treasury to the United States Navy. The Coast Guard did not return to Department of the Treasury control until 1946. Throughout World War II, McLane patrolled in the waters of the Territory of Alaska including the Bering Strait.

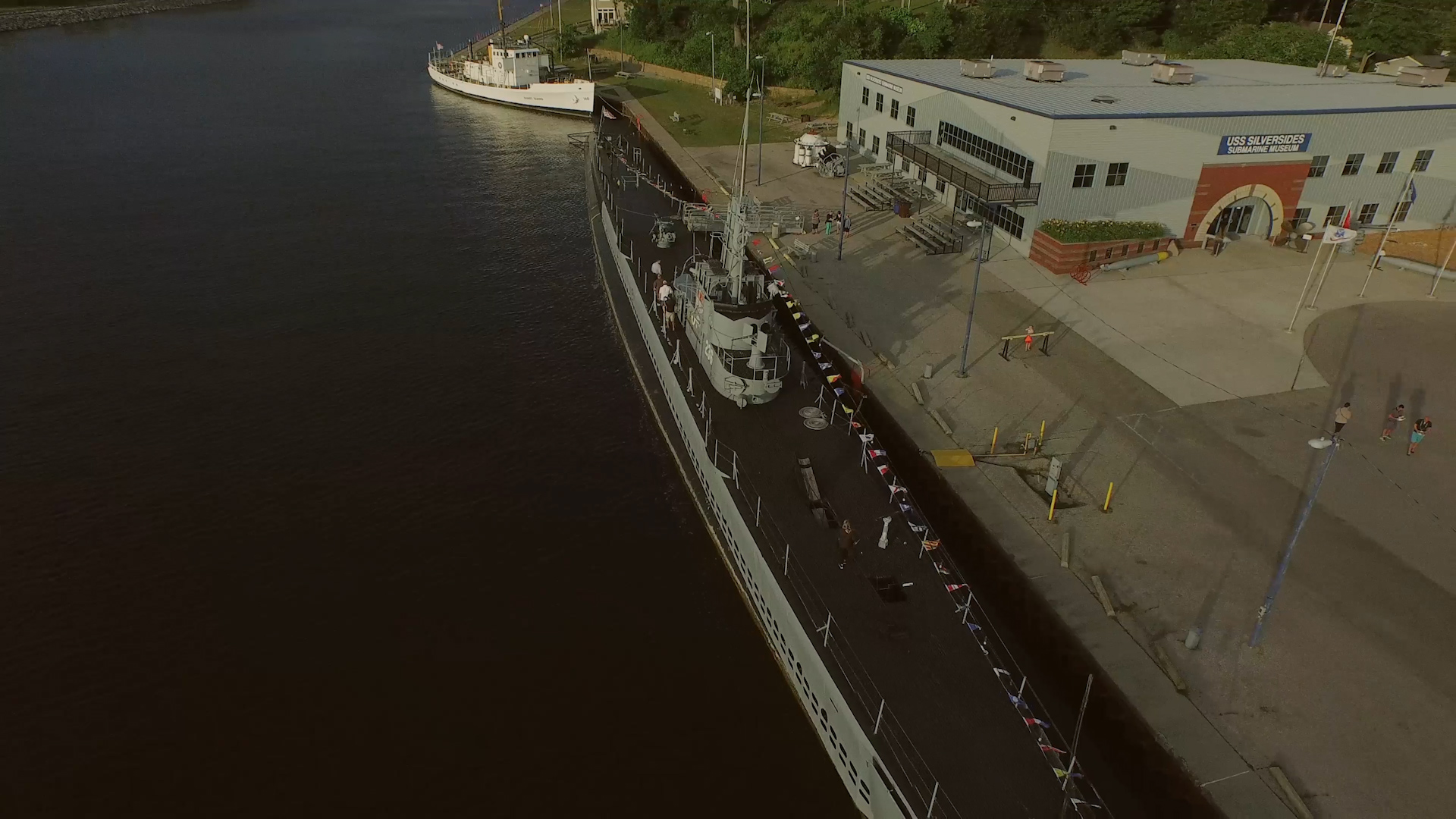
McLane (top of photo) at the USS Silversides Submarine Museum.

While on patrol in Dixon Entrance between Alaska and British Columbia on 7 June 1942, McLane received a report of an Imperial Japanese Navy submarine sighted in the area and began a search for it. On 8 July 1942, a Royal Canadian Air Force Bristol Bolingbroke maritime patrol aircraft of No. 115 Squadron reported that it had bombed and damaged a submarine at 55°20′N 134°41′W. The Coast Guard-manned U.S. Navy patrol vessel USS YP-251 and the Royal Canadian Navy minesweeper HMCS Quatsino joined McLane on 9 July 1942, and the three ships began a search for the submarine in Dixon Entrance southeast of Annette Island in Southeast Alaska. McLane reported that she gained sound contact on a submarine at 0800, but then lost it, and a depth charge she dropped set to explode at a depth of 300 feet (91 m) failed to detonate. She regained sound contact at 0905 and chased the submarine for an hour, McLane reporting that the submarine zigzagged and ran at short intervals to try to evade her, and after an hour she again lost contact. She regained sound contact at 1540, and at 1553 dropped two depth charges, one set to explode at 150 feet (46 m) and the other at 250 feet (76 m), and then two more at 1556, set to explode at 200 feet (61 m) and 300 feet (91 m). McLane and YP-251 reported that bubbles rose to the surface. The vessels reported that a torpedo passed ahead of McLane and only 28 yards (26 m) astern of YP-251 at 1735, leaving a 125-foot (38 m) feather that indicated the submarine's firing position, which McLane turned toward. YP-251 reported that she sighted a periscope and dropped a depth charge over the spot where the periscope submerged, and McLane followed up that attack with two depth charges of her own. McLane then attempted to regain sonar contact on the submarine. The vessels reported that an oil slick rose to the surface, and at 1935 YP-251 reported sighting a periscope, dropped a depth charge, and struck a submerged object, which she rode over. McLane then dropped two depth charges, after which the vessels reported that oil, bubbles, and what appeared to be rock wool (used to deaden sounds in submarines) rose to the surface. McLane continued to search the area for any sign of the submarine until early on the morning of 10 July 1942, but found none. McLane, YP-251, and the Bolingbroke aircraft received shared credit for sinking the submarine at 55°20′N 134°40′W. The commanding officers of the two vessels — and Lieutenant Ralph Burns, USCG, of McLane and Lieutenant Neils P. Thomsen, USCG, of YP-251, received the Legion of Merit for the action, and in 1947 the Joint Army-Navy Assessment Committee identified the sunken submarine as the Japanese submarine Ro-32. In 1967, however, the U.S. Navy determined that Ro-32 had been inactive in Japan at the time of the sinking and had remained afloat through the end of World War II, and the identity of the submarine reportedly sunk on 9 July 1942 remains undetermined. (Note: One hypothesis about the identity of the submarine sunk on 9 July 1942 is that she was the Soviet Navy submarine Shch-138, which the Soviet Navy reported missing on 10 July 1942, the day following the sinking. The Soviet Union later claimed that Shch-138 sank in the harbor at Nikolayevsk-on-Amur on the Amur River in the Soviet Union on 18 July 1942 after the explosion of four of her torpedoes, was refloated immediately, sank again the following the day during a storm while under tow, and finally was refloated a second time on 11 July 1943 and scrapped. A photo of the submarine reportedly taken by the crew of the Bolingbroke involved in her sinking purportedly shows a gray submarine — submarines of the Soviet Pacific Ocean Fleet were painted gray during World War II, while Japanese submarines were black — and the number "8" among characters painted on her conning tower, consistent with the markings on Shch-138′s conning tower. Some researchers have suggested that the Soviet narrative of Shch-138′s loss at Nikolayevsk-on-Amur may be intended to cover up Shch-138′s loss while clandestinely collecting information along the coast of the United States and Canada. (See Bruhn, p. 128.))

McLane rescued the crew of a downed Lockheed Model 10 Electra in February 1943.

In May 1966, McLane was reclassified as a medium endurance cutter and redesignated WMEC-146. She was decommissioned on 31 December 1968. She then became a training ship for the Sea Scouts.

McLane was donated to the Great Lakes Naval Memorial and Museum (now known as the USS Silversides Submarine Museum) in Muskegon, Michigan, in 1993 and was preserved there as a museum ship. She was berthed behind the submarine USS Silversides (SS-236). In 2025, McLane was sold for scrap due to deterioration of her hull that was beyond repair.

== Awards ==
- American Defense Service Medal
- American Campaign Medal
- Asiatic-Pacific Campaign Medal with battle star
- World War II Victory Medal
- National Defense Service Medal with star

== See also ==
- Rum Patrol

== Sources ==
- Bruhn, David D. Battle Stars for the "Cactus Navy": America's Fishing Vessels and Yachts in World War II. Berwyn Heights, Maryland: Heritage Books 2014. ISBN 978-0-7884-5573-5
- Canney, Donald L. (1995). U.S. Coast Guard and Revenue Cutters, 1790–1935. Naval Institute Press, Annapolis, Maryland. ISBN 978-1-55750-101-1.
- Flynn, Jim; Lortz, Ed; Lukas, Holger (March 2018). "Answer 39/48". Warship International. LV (January 2018): 23–25. ISSN 0043-0374.
- Johnson, Robert Irwin (1987). Guardians of the Sea, History of the United States Coast Guard, 1915 to the Present. Naval Institute Press, Annapolis, Maryland. ISBN 978-0-87021-720-3.
- Scheina, Robert L. (1982). U.S. Coast Guard Cutters & Craft of World War II. Naval Institute Press, Annapolis, Maryland. ISBN 978-0-87021-717-3.
- Scheina, Robert L. (1990). U.S. Coast Guard Cutters & Craft, 1946–1990. Naval Institute Press, Annapolis, Maryland. ISBN 978-0-87021-719-7.

=== Websites ===
- "13 May 1986". Daily Chronology of Coast Guard History. U.S. Coast Guard Historian's Office.
- "Crawford, 1927" (asp). Cutters, Craft & U.S. Coast Guard-Manned Army & Navy Vessels. U.S. Coast Guard Historian's Office.
- "Record of Movements, Vessels of the United States Coast Guard, 1790–December 31, 1933" (PDF). U.S. Coast Guard, Department of Transportation.
- "R/V Crawford 1956–1969". History of WHOI Ships. Woods Hole Oceanographic Institution.
