= No. 115 Squadron RCAF =

- Active: 1941–1944
- Disbanded: 23 August 1944
- Country: Canada
- Branch: Royal Canadian Air Force
- Role: Bomber Reconnaissance
- Nickname: Lynx
- Motto: BEWARE
- Battle honours: Pacific Coast 1942–44

No. 115 Squadron was a Royal Canadian Air Force Canadian Home War Establishment (HWE) Squadron that operated during World War II.

== Operational history ==
No. 115 Squadron flew anti-submarine patrols along the coasts of British Columbia and Southeast Alaska as part of Western Air Command.

On 7 July 1942, Flight Sergeant PMG W. E. Thomas and the crew of Bristol Bolingbroke maritime patrol aircraft No. 9118 sighted a target breaking the surface and emitting white "smoke" in the Pacific Ocean 130 kilometres (70 nmi; 81 mi) northwest of the Queen Charlotte Islands. At first thinking it was a whale, they quickly concluded that they could see the underwater silhouette of submarine at least 100 feet (30 m) in length and attacked, dropping a single 250-pound (113 kg) or 500-pound (227 kg) (sources disagree) bomb from an altitude of 500 feet (152 m) which landed just forward of the submarine's conning tower. They claimed to have damaged the submarine. Based on the Bolingbroke's report, the United States Coast Guard cutter USCGC McLane (WSC-146), the U.S. Coast Guard-crewed United States Navy patrol vessel USS YP-251, and the Royal Canadian Navy minesweeper HMCS Quatsino proceeded to the area on 9 July 1942, and began a search for the submarine, which McLane and YP-251 claimed to sink later that day. The Bolingbroke crew shared credit with McLane and YP-251 for the sinking, and in 1947 the Joint Army-Navy Assessment Committee identified their victim as the Imperial Japanese Navy submarine Ro-32. In 1967, however, the U.S. Navy retracted this assessment because Ro-32 had been inactive in Japan at the time of the sinking and was found afloat in Japan at the end of the war. The submarine reportedly sunk on 9 July 1942, remains unidentified. (Note: One hypothesis about the identity of the submarine sunk on 9 July 1942 is that she was the Soviet Navy submarine Shch-138, which the Soviet Navy reported missing on 10 July 1942, the day following the sinking. The Soviet Union later claimed that Shch-138 sank in the harbor at Nikolayevsk-on-Amur on the Amur River in the Soviet Union on 18 July 1942 after the explosion of four of her torpedoes, was refloated immediately, sank again the following the day during a storm while under tow, and finally was refloated a second time on 11 July 1943 and scrapped. A photograph of the submarine reportedly taken by the crew of the Bolingbroke involved in her sinking purportedly shows a gray submarine – submarines of the Soviet Pacific Ocean Fleet were painted gray during World War II, while Japanese submarines were black – and the number "8" among characters painted on her conning tower, consistent with the markings on Shch-138′s conning tower. Some researchers have suggested that the Soviet narrative of Shch-138′s loss at Nikolayevsk-on-Amur may be intended to cover up Shch-138′s loss while clandestinely collecting information along the coast of the United States and Canada. (See Bruhn, p. 128, and Coyle.))

No. 115 Squadron disbanded at Tolfino, British Columbia, in August 1944.

== Equipment ==
- Bristol Bolingbroke I (August – December 1941)
- Bristol Bolingbroke IV (November 1941 – August 1943)
- Lockheed Ventura GR.V (August 1943 – August 1944)

The squadron's two-letter squadron code was BK from August 1939 to May 1942, then UV until the RCAF HWE discontinued the use of squadron codes on 16 October 1942 "for security reasons".

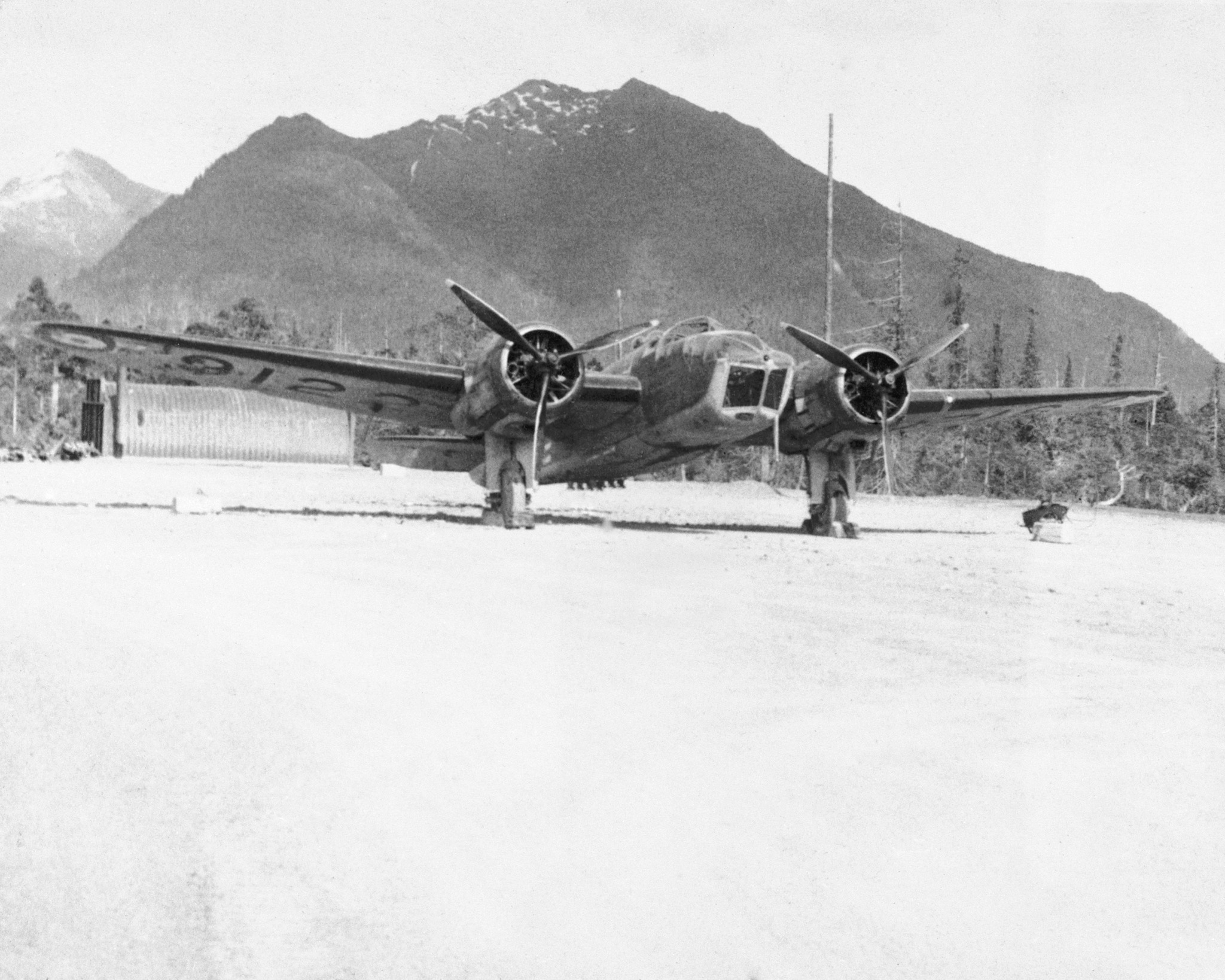
Commanding Officer's aircraft of 115 Squadron, Feb 1943 – Annette Island, Alaska

== See also ==
- List of Royal Canadian Air Force squadrons
- List of aircraft of the Canadian Air Force
- List of Royal Canadian Air Force stations
