= CFD Mountain View =

Canadian Forces airfield in Ontario

- Canada
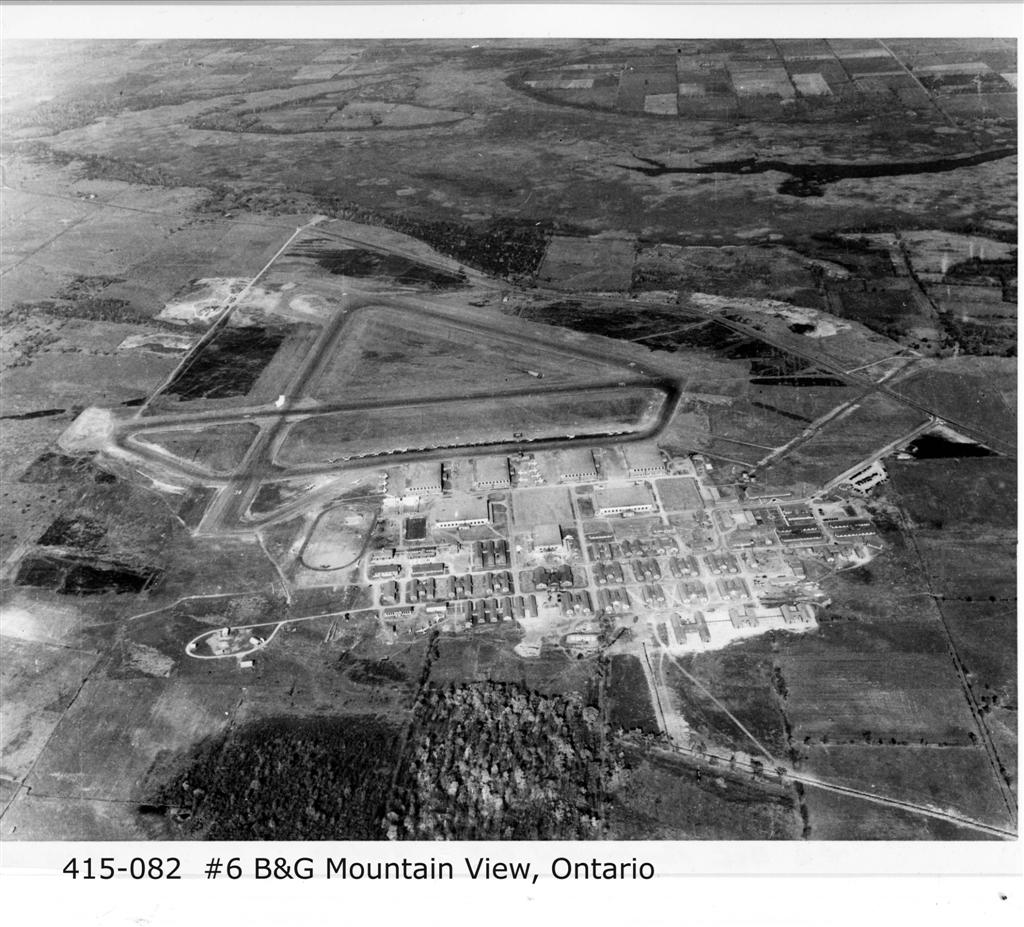
- RCAF Station Mountain View, circa 1940s

Site information
- Owner: Department of National Defence
- Operator: Royal Canadian Air Force

Location
- Location within Ontario

Site history
- Built: 1941

Garrison information
- Garrison: No. 6 Bombing and Gunnery School

Canadian Forces Detachment Mountain View, also CFD Mountain View, is a Canadian Forces airfield (Trenton/Mountain View Airport) located in Prince Edward County, Ontario, south of Belleville. It is geographically close to CFB Trenton, which has administrative responsibility for the facilities.

== History ==
=== World War II ===
The Mountain View aerodrome opened 23 June 1941 to host No. 6 Bombing and Gunnery School (6 B&GS), one of eleven bombing and gunnery schools that opened across Canada under the British Commonwealth Air Training Plan during the Second World War. Aircraft used included the Anson, Battle, Lysander, Bolingbroke, and Nomad. The station was later designated RCAF Station Mountain View when No. 6 B&GS was renamed the Ground Instruction School and merged with the Air Armament School at RCAF Station Trenton.

=== Aerodrome information ===
In approximately 1942 the aerodrome was listed as RCAF Aerodrome - Mountain View, Ontario at 44°04′N 77°20′W with a variation of 12 degrees west and elevation of 360 ft (110 m). Three serviceable runways were listed as follows:

Runway name	Length	Width	Surface
6/24	2,500 ft (760 m)	150 ft (46 m)	Hard Surfaced
16/34	2,500 ft (760 m)	150 ft (46 m)	Hard Surfaced
10/28	2,500 ft (760 m)	150 ft (46 m)	Hard Surfaced

=== Postwar ===
The RCAF fire fighting school moved to Mountain View from Trenton in 1946, but later moved to RCAF Station Aylmer. Also in 1946, RCAF Station Mountain View became a detachment of RCAF Station Trenton.

CFD Mountain View includes three recognized Federal Heritage building 1986 on the Register of the Government of Canada Heritage Buildings.

- Building 77 / Hangar 1 recognized - 2003
- Building 82 / Hangar 6 recognized - 2003
- Building 96 / Hangar 8 recognized - 2007

== Operations ==
The main use of CFB Trenton Mountain View Detachment is the storage and overhaul of older aircraft. This facility belongs to the Aerospace and Telecommunications Engineering Support Squadron (ATESS) based at Trenton. In September 2000, 8 Wing Trenton opened the Canadian Parachute Centre's (now the Canadian Army Advanced Warfare Centre) drop zone at Mountain View. The Mountain View facility is also used by Central Region Gliding School (CRGS) for Royal Canadian Air Cadets glider training.

A new 4800' gravel runway (06L/24R) was constructed in 2006 to train CC-130 Hercules aircraft crew in landing on unprepared landing strips. A CC-177 Globemaster III demonstrated similar capabilities in 2009.

== See also ==
- Trenton/Mountain View Airport
