= John Hasek =

Canadian soldier and journalist (1938–1994)

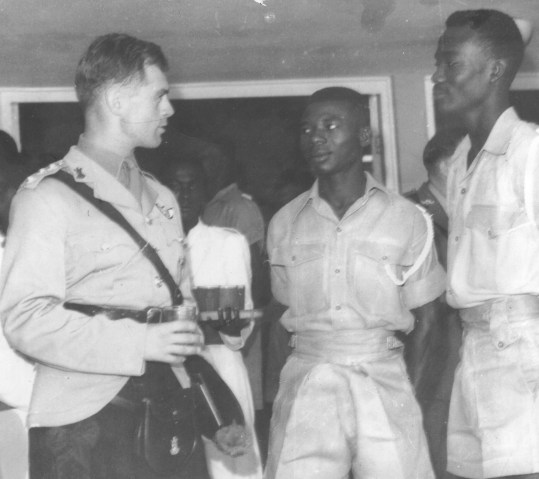
- Maj. John Hasek (left), member of Canadian Forces mission to Ghana, 1965–67
- Born: Jan Jaroslav Jindřich Jiři Hásek; January 28, 1938; Prague, Czechoslovakia
- Died: January 1, 1994 (aged 55); Prague, Czech Republic
- Military career
- Allegiance: Canada
- Service years: 1957–1981
- Rank: Major

John Henry George Hasek, CD (January 28, 1938 – January 1, 1994) was a Czech-born Canadian soldier, journalist and author.

== Biography ==
After fleeing post-Second World War communist Czechoslovakia, he and his family emigrated to the United Kingdom, South America and eventually Canada where Hasek joined the Canadian Army in 1957.

Major Hasek graduated from the University of Ottawa and later the University of New Brunswick with a Master of Arts in Psychology. As a member of the Canadian Army he studied and worked as an instructor at the Royal Military College in Kingston, Ontario. John was the first foreign graduate of the John F. Kennedy School of Special Warfare and was a recognized expert in active measures, disinformation, psychological warfare and subversion. He was a frequent lecturer at the US Air Force Special Operations Command at Hurlburt Field, Florida.

Hasek served in The Black Watch (Royal Highland Regiment) of Canada, The Royal Canadian Regiment and later The Queen's Own Rifles of Canada.

While with the Canadian Army, later Mobile Command, Hasek served in Ghana, Vietnam and Cyprus and as the first commander of the SkyHawks Parachute Team, which is the Demonstration Parachute Team of the Canadian Forces. An accomplished skydiver, Hasek had several thousand descents to his credit, and served as a member of the Parachute Testing Wing/Trials and Evaluations centre of the Airborne Centre in Edmonton, Alberta.

After retiring in 1981, he worked as a freelance journalist and published The Disarming of Canada (1987). Following the fall of the iron curtain, John founded "Education for Democracy", a non-profit organisation bringing over 1500 volunteer English teachers to Czechoslovakia from Canada, the United States, Great Britain and Australia. Education for Democracy was renamed "John Hasek Society" in 1994 shortly after Hasek's death.

Hasek covered the breakup of Yugoslavia as a freelance reporter for the CBC, Ottawa Citizen, Washington Inquirer and Inter Press Service. He was seriously wounded in June 1993 near Šibenik, Croatia. The causes of his accident were unclear, with some speculating that he had hit a mine in his car, or due to a collision with a Serb military vehicle. After being operated on in a nearly abandoned hospital in Zadar, he was transferred in a Czech government flight to the Central Military Hospital in Prague on 30 June where he died six months later on 1 January 1994. He is survived by his wife, Glenna, two children, Anthony and Elizabeth, and grandchildren, Nicole and Jakub.
