= No. 6 Repair Depot RCAF =

Aircraft modification and repair unit

No. 6 Repair Depot (6 RD) was an aircraft modification and repair unit of the Royal Canadian Air Force's Air Materiel Command located at Trenton, Ontario. Duties of No. 6 RD included handling aircraft at other stations around southern Ontario and assisting with aircraft being serviced or modified at other locations such as Avro where aircraft were modified for postwar use. No. 6RD personnel ferried many aircraft types to and from Trenton, and flew aircraft to storage facilities after the Second World War. Aircraft salvage was another responsibility. Crashed aircraft or aircraft that had forced-landed were cleaned up or dismantled to be shipped back to Trenton.

CFB Trenton was built over swamps and sometimes No. 6 RD personnel lived in tents for temporary housing. Nicknamed "tent city", the mechanics had to sleep there for many weeks in a row. During New Year's Eve of 1952, fireworks set fire to hangar No. 9 and it burned to the ground along with three Lancasters, two Mitchells, one Grumman Goose, a Harvard and numerous pieces of handling equipment. No. 6RD specialized in the repair of North American Harvard trainers as well as Avro Ansons, Liberators and Spitfires for the RCAF and the RAF in 1940 until after the Second World War. The unit's slogan was "Nil Nobis Irreparabile" (Translation: Nothing Beyond Repair For Us") until 1978 when they changed their slogan to "Excellence". In 1970, the name changed to the Aerospace Maintenance Development Unit, or AMDU. The AMDU helped in the exchange of the Canadian CF-5s to Venezuela. Also, the No. 6 RD personnel built the Silver Dart II in 1959.

== Commanding officers ==
- G/C F.L. Tretheway (Mar. 1940 – Oct. 1941)
- G/C.A.H. Simmonds (RAF) (Oct. 1941 – Sept. 1942)
- G/C W.M. Keddie (RAF)
- G/C A.R. Layard, OBE
- G/C G.G. Truscott, OBE
- G/C S.A. Greene, MBE
- G/C D.H. McCaul, CD
- G/C T.A. Spruston, MBE
- W/C W.H. Smith
- G/C C.R. Thompson, CD
- G/C E.P. Brigland, CD
- G/C A.I. Pudsley, CD
- Col M.T. Friedl, CD
- LCol R.F. Brown, CD
- Col J.W. Garland, DGC, CD
- Col W.G. Doupe, CD
- Col J.H. Spratley, CD
- Col J.D. Young CD
- Col M.F. Phillips, CD
- Col R.I. McDowell, CD
- Col G.G. Chivers, CD
