= Montreal Aviation Museum =

- Musée de l'aviation de Montréal

- Location of the Montreal Aviation Museum on the Island of Montreal
- Established: 1998
- Location: Macdonald Campus, Sainte-Anne-de-Bellevue, Quebec, Canada
- Coordinates: 45.4125388°N 73.9416200°W
- Public transit access: 419 Express John Abbott; 7 Gare Vaudreuil / John-Abbott / Pointe-Claire
- Website: www.mam.quebec

The Montreal Aviation Museum (French: Musée de L'aviation de Montréal), formerly the Canadian Aviation Heritage Centre (French: Centre canadien du patrimoine aéronautique), is an aviation museum located in Sainte-Anne-de-Bellevue, Quebec, Canada.

== History ==
The Canadian Aviation Heritage Centre was established in 1998 by Godfrey Pasmore. The museum opened to the public in 2009. The Canadian Aviation Heritage Centre changed its name to the Montreal Aviation Museum in 2016.

== Collection ==
The museum collection includes the following aircraft:

- Blériot XI
- Fairchild Bolingbroke Mk IV
- Fairchild FC-2
- Fleet Canuck
- Curtiss-Reid Rambler

=== Projects under restoration ===
- Fairchild Bolingbroke Mk IV
- Noorduyn Norseman
- Canadair CF-104 Starfighter

== See also ==
- List of aviation museums
