= SkyHawks =

SkyHawks Parachute Team
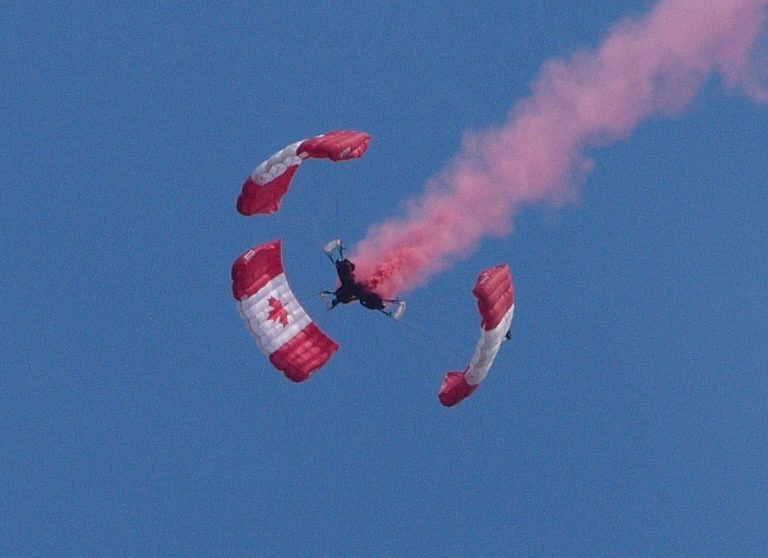
- Active: 1971–present
- Country: Canada
- Branch: Canadian Army
- Role: Parachute team
- Part of: Canadian Army Advanced Warfare Centre
- Website: www.army-armee.forces.gc.ca/en/skyhawks/index.page

The SkyHawks are the Canadian Forces Parachute Demonstration Team. Based at CFB Trenton in Trenton, Ontario, they are a sub-unit of the Canadian Army Advanced Warfare Centre (CAAWC).

The team consists of both permanent members and temporary members from the Regular and Reserve Forces. They act as ambassadors for the Canadian Forces at special events, airshows and events. They are easily recognizable because their parachutes resemble the Canadian flag.

== History ==
The team was established in 1971 with Major John Hasek as its first commander. The SkyHawks have appeared in more than 4,200 shows, performing for over 75 million spectators. Other than Canada and the United States, they have also made appearances around the world including Japan, France and Australia. The SkyHawks have demonstrated parachuting at a Rolling Stones concert in 2003, at the Juno Beach Centre opening celebrations in Normandy, and at the 60th anniversary of the Liberation of Holland. The team conducts over 3,400 parachute descents at training camp each year in order to prepare for their show season, which runs from March until October.

Over the years augmentee demonstration parachutists have been drawn from all commands of the Canadian Forces, representing a myriad of trades and officer classifications.

The SkyHawks team spends five weeks training in the clear, sunny skies of California. Members of the SkyHawks also provide instructor assistance for parachute training to members of the Canadian Forces at the CAAWC. The team uses a leased Short SC.7 Skyvan aircraft as their primary jump platform.

== See also ==
- Parachute rigger
- Canadian Sport Parachuting Association

=== Other teams worldwide ===
- Singapore Armed Forces Parachute Team—Red Lions
- United Kingdom—Red Devils (Parachute Regiment)
- United States Army Parachute Team—The Golden Knights
- US Special Operations Command parachute team
