= Canadian Army Advanced Warfare Centre =

- Centre d'instruction supérieure en guerre terrestre de l'Armée canadienne
- Active: 1996–present
- Country: Canada
- Branch: Canadian Army
- Type: Instructional school
- Role: Centre of excellence for Canadian Forces parachuting program, unique-environment soldiering, and advanced warfare skill sets
- Size: HQ Coy, Parachute Training Coy, Advanced Mobility Coy, Support Coy
- Part of: Combat Training Centre
- Garrison/HQ: CFB Trenton, Ontario
- Motto: Ex cœlis (Latin for 'From above')
- Website: canada.ca/en/army/corporate/canadian-army-doctrine-and-training-centre/combat-training-centre/canadian-army-advanced-warfare-centre.html

Commanders
- Current commander: LCol J.T.E. Kenney

The Canadian Army Advanced Warfare Centre (CAAWC, French: Centre d'instruction supérieure en guerre terrestre de l'Armée canadienne, CISGTAC), formerly Canadian Forces Land Advanced Warfare Centre (CFLAWC), Canadian Parachute Centre (CPC), and Canadian Airborne Centre (CABC), is a Canadian Forces training facility at CFB Trenton, Ontario, Canada.

== History ==
In June–August 2013 the Advanced Warfare Centre was renamed from the Canadian Forces Land Advanced Warfare Centre (CFLAWC). Before CFLAWC, it had been known as the Canadian Parachute Centre (CPC) since 1996.

CFLAWC traces its lineage to the formation of the Canadian Parachute Training Centre (CPTC) in 1942, in response to a special need for parachute infantry in the Second World War. In 1947, the CPTC was relocated to RCAF Station Rivers (Manitoba) and renamed to the Canadian Airborne Centre (CABC). In April 1947, it was renamed, again, to the Canadian Joint Air Training Centre.

In 1970, it was renamed back to CABC and moved to Canadian Forces Base Edmonton, where it resided until 1996. It was renamed and its mandate expanded to become a "centre of excellence" for advanced war-fighting skills for the Canadian Army.

== Description ==
CAAWC is designated as the army centre of excellence for static-line round, static-line square and military free-fall parachuting, and it teaches basic, jump master and instructor courses in each subset of parachuting. Equally important, within its mission are: the Arctic operations advisor, basic/advanced mountain operations, helicopter insertion instructor, helicopter operations, and aerial delivery courses. The centre is also responsible for the Canadian Forces Pathfinder course.

CAAWC comprises Headquarters Company, Parachute Training Company, Advanced Mobility, and Support Company (which supports all CAAWC training and also acts as the Canadian Forces Parachute Depot).

The centre sends members of its staff on international courses to learn best practices from allied nations and develop them into specialists and maintains a capability in desert, jungle, and amphibious warfare. A mutual parachute instructor exchange occurs throughout the year with the United States Army Airborne School to foster the relationship between Canadian and US forces.

== The SkyHawks ==
The SkyHawks Parachute Team is a sub-subunit of CAAWC. It is the Canadian Forces Parachute Demonstration Team, which conducts parachute demonstration and relative canopy work at airshows and special events worldwide.

== See also ==
- Pathfinders (military)
- Jumpmaster
