= Air Cadet Gliding Program =

- Insignia awarded to graduates of the Air Cadet Gliding Program
- Active: 1965–present
- Country: Canada
- Type: Youth Organization
- Part of: Royal Canadian Air Cadets
- Headquarters: Ottawa, Ontario, Canada

Aircraft flown
- Trainer: Schweizer SGS 2-33A; Bellanca Scout (Central and NW Regions); Cessna L-19 (Eastern and Atlantic Regions); Cessna 182 (Pacific Region)

The Air Cadet Gliding Program is a youth gliding program operated by the Canadian Forces (CF) and the Air Cadet League of Canada for the benefit of the Royal Canadian Air Cadets.

The program is managed by CF officers (most of whom are CIC officers), and is the largest producer of glider pilots in Canada. Cadets aged 16-18 years are trained at the Mountain View and St-Jean Cadet Flying Training Centres (formerly 5 RGS's), and about 100 cadets (formerly around 300 before covid) receive their glider pilot license each year. In 2026, GPTC was conducted at the Gimli Cadet Flying Training Centre instead of Mountain View.

Outside of the Regional Gliding Schools, the local headquarters provide the opportunity for cadets to participate in gliding familiarization flying during the spring and fall — approximately 22,000 flights are completed. Senior cadets who have completed the Air Cadet Gliding Program also perform staff duties at glider familiarization flying and at the summer training program.

== Locations of the Regional Gliding Schools ==
- Regional Gliding School (Pacific) - RGS (P) - Comox, BC
- Regional Gliding School (Northwest) - RGS (NW) - Brandon, MB
- Central Region Gliding School - (CRGS) - Mountain View, ON and Picton, ON
- Eastern Region Gliding School - (ERGS) - St-Jean-sur-Richelieu, QC
- Regional Gliding School (Atlantic) - RGS(A) - Debert, NS

Following a hiatus in 2020 and 2021 due to the global pandemic, the Glider Pilot Training Course resumed at a limited capacity in Northwest, Central, and Eastern regions, with candidates participating from all 5 regions. From 2024-2025, the GPTC was reduced to operating in Central and Eastern, with 50 cadets at each training centre, composed of cadets from across Canada. In 2026, GPTC operated with 30 cadets in Northwest and 50 cadets in Eastern.
