= CFB Trenton =

Canadian Forces base in Ontario

Canadian Forces Base Trenton 8 Wing Trenton

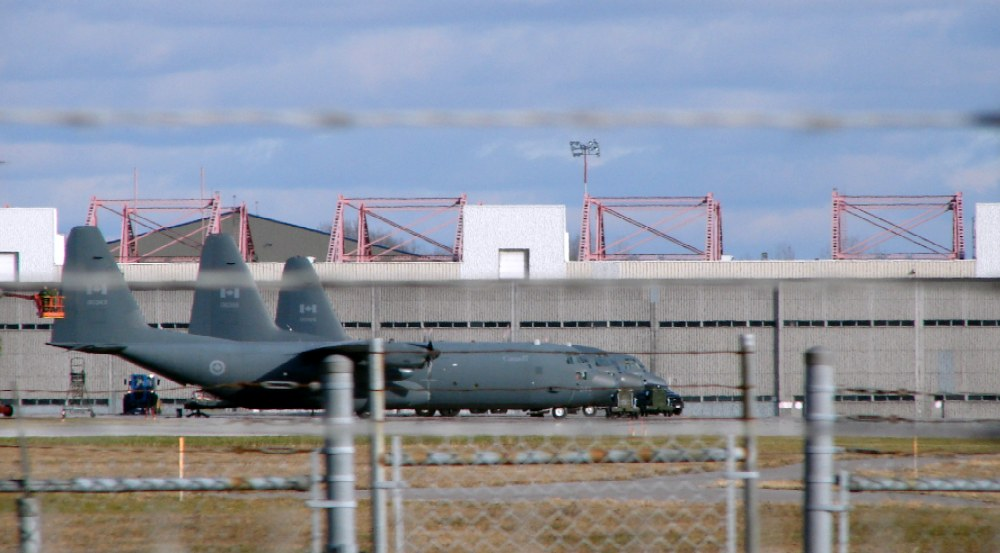
- IATA: YTR; ICAO: CYTR; WMO: 71621

Summary
- Airport type: Military
- Owner: Government of Canada
- Operator: DND
- Location: Quinte West, Ontario
- Time zone: EST (UTC−05:00)
  - Summer (DST): EDT (UTC−04:00)
- Elevation AMSL: 283 ft (86 m)
- Coordinates: 44°07′09″N 077°31′42″W
- Website: www.cfbtrenton.com

Map
- Location in Ontario

Runways
Direction	Length		Surface
Direction	ft	m	Surface
06/24	10,001	3,048	Asphalt
- Source: Canada Flight Supplement; Environment Canada

Canadian Forces Base Trenton (IATA: YTR, ICAO: CYTR) (also CFB Trenton), formerly RCAF Station Trenton, is a Canadian Forces base located within the city of Quinte West, Ontario, about 175 km (109 miles) east of Toronto. It is operated as an air force base by the Royal Canadian Air Force (RCAF) and is the hub for air transport operations in Canada and abroad. Its primary RCAF lodger unit is 8 Wing, commonly referred to as 8 Wing Trenton. CFB Trenton is Canada's largest Air Force base and most southerly air base.

The airport is classified as an airport of entry by Nav Canada and is staffed by the Canada Border Services Agency. The use of the airport for civilian aircraft is permitted for emergencies or MEDEVACs only and the CBSA officers can only handle general aviation aircraft with up to 15 passengers.

== History ==
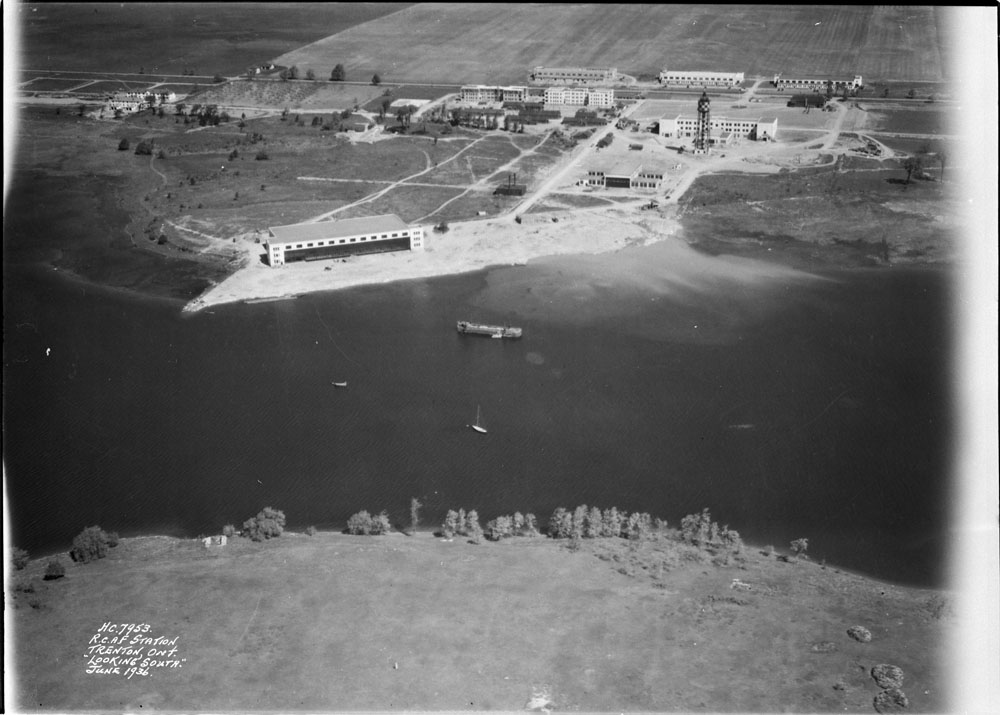
Aerial view of RCAF Station Trenton, June 1936

=== 1929–1939 Prewar ===
In 1929, 960 acres (390 ha) of farmland near Trenton were purchased by the federal government to establish a Royal Canadian Air Force (RCAF) station to be called RCAF Station Trenton. The base was officially opened in August 1931. Lord Bessborough, the Governor General in 1931, laid the commemorative cornerstone of the airbase, which had the motto, "Per Ardua ad Rem," or "Through Adversity to the Good". This motto was the long-standing unspoken motto of the airmen of CFB Trenton. Trenton was intended as a smaller supporting base to RCAF Station Borden, which was the home of Canadian military aviation and a major training base at the time. By June 1937 it had replaced Camp Borden as the primary flying training centre; the older station was given over increasingly to technical and trades training. The location was chosen for being the midpoint between Ottawa and Toronto. It also provided the possibility of using the facility for seaplanes operating on Lake Ontario.

=== 1939–1945 World War II ===
No. 1 Fighter and No. 3 Army Cooperation Flights, flying Siskin and Tiger Moth aircraft, were the first air elements to be hosted at Trenton. Trenton was the largest training centre of the British Commonwealth Air Training Plan (BCATP) during the Second World War. Schools included the RCAF Central Flying School, No. 1 Air Navigation School (to 1942), No. 1 Flying Instructor School, and No. 1 Composite Training School. Along with the training schools, the No. 6 Repair Depot was based at Trenton. During the war the relief landing field for Trenton was located at Mohawk.

Trenton was home to RCAF 102 KU Flt - Central Air Command (CAC) Composite during the war. It flew Harvard, Mustang, Dakota, Expeditor, H-5.

==== Historical aerodrome information ====
In approximately 1942 the aerodrome was listed as RCAF Aerodrome - Trenton, Ontario at 44°07′N 77°32′W with a variation of 12 degrees west and elevation of 240 ft (73 m). The field was listed as "all hard surfaced" and detailed four runways as follows:

Runway name	Length	Width	Surface
1/19	3,000 ft (910 m)	150 ft (46 m)	Hard surfaced
5/23	3,600 ft (1,100 m)	150 ft (46 m)	Hard surfaced
14/32	3,050 ft (930 m)	150 ft (46 m)	Hard surfaced
9/27	4,200 ft (1,300 m)	150 ft (46 m)	Hard surfaced

=== 1945–1990 Cold War ===
Following the war, Trenton became home to transport and fighter aircraft, with transport aircraft from the base taking part in the Korean Airlift, as well as numerous other missions throughout the 1950s and 1960s.

On February 2, 1959, RCAF Station Trenton became the destination for CF-105 Arrow 25204, flying from the Avro Canada manufacturing facility at Malton Airport. A Trans-Canada Air Lines Vickers Viscount had crash landed during 25204's flight, temporarily closing the runways at Malton.

After World War II, No. 102 Composite Unit became a search and rescue unit. It flew Piasecki H-42A and H-44. Canada upgraded its transport and search and rescue fleets during the 1960s when the RCAF purchased the CC-137 Husky, CC-130 Hercules, CH-113 Labrador and CC-115 Buffalo aircraft. RCAF Station Trenton became the home of training facilities for these aircraft. No. 102 Composite Unit eventually merged into the reactivated 424 Transport and Rescue Squadron in 1968.

RCAF Station Trenton was renamed Canadian Forces Base (CFB) Trenton after the February 1, 1968 merger of the RCAF with the Royal Canadian Navy and Canadian Army to form the Canadian Forces.

=== 21st century ===
==== Arrest and conviction of former base commander ====
CFB Trenton's former commander, David Russell Williams, was arrested in 2010, and convicted of serial rape and murder in 2010; some of his crimes were committed while in command of the base.

==== Use as a quarantine facility for COVID-19 ====
Due to the COVID-19 pandemic in Canada of coronavirus disease 2019 caused by SARS-CoV-2 that detected in Wuhan, China, on February 7, 2020, 215 Canadians (176 from the first plane, and 39 from a second plane chartered by the U.S. government) were repatriated from Wuhan, and brought to CFB Trenton to be quarantined for two weeks. On February 11, another plane of repatriated Canadians (185) from Wuhan landed at CFB Trenton. On February 21, a chartered flight of 131 Canadians who were quarantined on the Diamond Princess after an outbreak on the cruise ship in Japan, and who all tested negative for the virus, were brought to CFB Trenton for additional screening before being transported by bus to NAV Centre in Cornwall, Ontario, to be quarantined. On March 10, a chartered flight of 228 Canadians who were on the Grand Princess after an outbreak on the cruise ship in California, and who all did not test positive for the virus, were brought to CFB Trenton for a 14-day quarantine period. By March 24, 13 positive cases for the virus of the repatriated citizens at CFB Trenton were reported.

==== Charges against and removal of command of current base commander ====
On August 28, 2023, Colonel Leif Dahl, the commander of the base and the 8th Wing, was charged by the Ontario Provincial Police with charges related to firearms and illegal hunting. Two days later, on August 30, MGen Iain Huddleston, Commander, 1 Canadian Air Division, temporarily removed Col Dahl from his command.

== Facilities ==
=== Heritage buildings ===
CFB Trenton has several recognized and classified Federal Heritage buildings on the Register of the Government of Canada Heritage Buildings.

- Administration Building 29 Recognized – 1995
- Hangars 3 Buildings 51; 5 Building 49 Recognized – 1991
- Hangars 9 B112; 10 B52 Recognized – 2004
- Hastings Hall / Officer's Quarters, Building 111 Recognized – 1995
- Headquarters Buildings 22 & 23 Recognized – 1995
- Junior Quarters, Buildings 21 & 56 Recognized – 1995
- Officer's Mess Building 38 Recognized – 1995
- VIP Private Married Quarters Building 42 Recognized – 1995

=== Current ===
The recapitalization of the northeast ramp was completed in summer 2008, and reconstruction of the southeast ramp was completed in the summer of 2009.

Construction of a new air traffic control tower was completed in July 2010.

The Canadian Forces Aerospace Warfare Centre is housed in a new building named after Air Marshal Clare Annis. Leed Gold Standard certification is underway from the Canada Green Building Council.

A new Material Distribution Centre opened on November 2, 2010. The $2.4-million project is an amalgamation and co-location of the Wing's Central Material Traffic Terminal of 2 Air Movement Squadron (2 Air Mov Sqn) with the material distribution centre of 8 Wing Supply.

A 17,500 m^{2} (188,400 sq ft) Electrical and Mechanical Engineering (EME) and transportation garage valued at $75 million was completed in 2012.

The Air Mobility Training Centre project saw the construction of a 17,000 m^{2} (183,000 sq ft) facility that houses the equipment and personnel required to train operators and maintainers of the CC-130J Super Hercules aircraft. Building construction was completed in 2011 and operations began in 2012. The building is now located on the south side of the base across the highway from the runway.

=== Future ===
The base could host CH-149 Cormorant Search And Rescue helicopters if Canada increases the CH-149 fleet as planned.

== Present operations ==
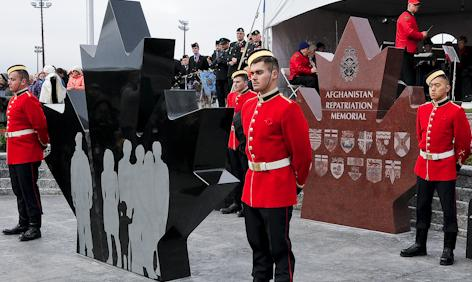
Royal Military College of Canada cadets attend unveiling of Afghanistan Repatriation Memorial, CFB Trenton, Trenton, Ontario 10 Nov. 2012.

The RCAF operates the majority of its fixed-wing tactical airlift and all of its strategic airlift aircraft from CFB Trenton.

The primary lodger unit of CFB Trenton is 8 Wing, which operates several aircraft types, including CC-130 Hercules, CC-150 Polaris and CC-177 Globemaster III transport aircraft, the CH-146 Griffon search and rescue helicopters, and the CC-144 Challenger VIP transport aircraft. The Challenger fleet, used to fly the Governor General, members of the Royal Family (when visiting Canada), the Prime Minister and members of the federal cabinet, is based at Ottawa Macdonald–Cartier International Airport but supported from CFB Trenton.

Current squadrons under 8 Wing include:

- 424 Transport and Rescue Squadron (424 Tiger Squadron) - Flying the CC-130J and CH-146
- 426 Transport Training Squadron (426 Thunderbird Squadron) - Training for CC-130H, CC-150, CH-146
- 429 Transport Squadron (429 Bison Squadron) - Flying the CC-177
- 436 Transport Squadron (436 Tusker Squadron) - Flying the CC-130J
- 437 Transport Squadron (437 Husky Squadron) - Flying the CC-150, CC-330
- 412 Transport Squadron - Flying the CC-144 (geographically separated unit based at Ottawa Macdonald–Cartier International Airport, ON)
- 440 Transport Squadron - Flying the CC-138 (geographically separated unit based at Yellowknife Airport, NT)
- 2 Air Movement Squadron (2 Air Mov Sqn)
- 8 Air Maintenance Squadron (8 AMS)

Current Lodger Units in CFB Trenton include:

- Joint Rescue Coordination Centre
- Canadian Mission Control Centre
- Search and Rescue Network Operations Communications Centre
- Canadian Army Advanced Warfare Centre

Temporary storage facilities were built at the base for the CC-177 Globemaster III. Permanent hangars (Hangar 2 and 6) were built from 2012 to 2017.

CFB Trenton is also home to other RCAF lodger units independent from 8 Wing including:

- Aerospace and Telecommunications Engineering Support Squadron (ATESS) - providing specialized engineering, training, and production/manufacturing in aerospace and telecommunications. Its capabilities encompass avionics, non-destructive testing (NDT), integrated health monitoring (IHM/HUMS), aircraft structures and more.
- The Royal Canadian Air Force Aerospace Warfare Centre (RCAF AWC), the centre of excellence for air power development, including Concept Development and Experimentation (CD&E) and lessons learned. In addition, the RCAF AWC develops and maintains the Air Force air power knowledge repository and coordinates efforts to provide advanced synthetic environment and modelling and simulation services to assist CD&E, requirements definition, operational test and evaluation (OT&E) and mission rehearsal. The RCAF AWC is commanded by an RCAF Colonel.
- 8 Air Communications and Control Squadron (8 ACCS) provides expeditionary communications and air traffic control capabilities under 2 Wing for the RCAF.

CFB Trenton plays a key support role for the National Search and Rescue Program, being home to Joint Rescue Coordination Centre Trenton (JRCC Trenton) which is jointly staffed by the RCAF and Canadian Coast Guard personnel who have responsibility for coordinating aircraft and marine rescue incidents in central and Arctic Canada. The RCAF also operates the Canadian Mission Control Centre (CMCC) from the base, which is tasked with monitoring the Cospas-Sarsat system that detects transmissions from emergency locating beacons on aircraft or marine vessels in distress through Canada's search and rescue area of responsibility.

The Canadian Army also operates the Canadian Army Advanced Warfare Centre, formerly known as the Canadian Parachute Centre.

In addition, the Canadian Joint Incident Response Unit (CJIRU), a CBRN capability which is part of the Canadian Special Operations Forces Command is based at CFB Trenton.

In 2023, the commander of CFB Trenton and 8 Wing was Colonel Leighton James, who was sworn in as base commander on October 5, 2023.

As of 2024, the CFB Trenton and 8 Wing commander is Colonel J.A. Bowser. Colonel Bowser was sworn in on July 17, 2024.

== Other operations ==
=== Quinte International Air Show ===
In 2016, the former base commander, Colonel Colin Keiver and Chief Warrant Officer Darcy Elder, had recreated the Quinte International Air Show which had not been held since 2003. There had been plans for the air show to be held biennially, though there had been no air show in 2018. Mark Goulden, the commander at the time of the cancellation, stated "Operations at 8 Wing Trenton is our priority, whether it be helping Canadians during disasters such as the British Columbia wildfires, delivering humanitarian aid internationally, or supplying Canadian Armed Forces missions around the world. It is with these operational commitments in mind that 8 Wing Trenton has made the difficult decision to cancel the 2018 Quinte International Air Show." Throughout 2020, it was unclear whether or not there would be an air show any time in the future due to CFB Trenton being at the forefront of Canada's efforts to gain control over the COVID-19 virus.

In connection with the Royal Canadian Air Force's 100th anniversary the 2024 show is ran at CFB Trenton through the Canada Day weekend.

==== Quinte International Air Show 2016 ====
The 2016 air show attracted close to 80,000 visitors. The theme was the commemoration of the British Commonwealth Air Training Plan (BCATP) with it being the 75th Anniversary since the BCATP had commenced. Aircraft from multiple air forces around the world attended including the United States Air Force, Royal Air Force and Mexican Air Force.

Some of the aircraft performing at the air show included:

- Boeing B-52 Stratofortress
- Avro Lancaster
- Interstate Cadet
- Lockheed C-130 Hercules
- Lockheed Martin F-22 Raptor
- McDonnell Douglas CF-18 Hornet
- North American B-25 Mitchell
- North American P-51 Mustang
- North American T-6 Texan
- Canadair CT-114 Tutors
- Yakovlev Yak-52 and many more aircraft parked on the ramp.

==== Quinte International Air Show 2024 ====
The Quinte International Air Show (QIAS) 2024 was put on to commemorate the Royal Canadian Air Force's 100 anniversary. An estimated 50,000 plus guest were present throughout the weekend. The Italian Air Force was present with their 313th Aerobatic Training Squadron. A large selection of static display aircraft were parked.

Notable performers and aircraft:

- Skyhawks
- Snowbirds
- Frecce Tricolori
- McDonnell Douglas CF-18 Hornet
- Boeing CC-117 Globemaster III
- Northern Stars Aeroteam
- General Dynamics F-16 Fighting Falcon.

=== CFD Mountain View ===
The Mountain View Detachment, a former World War II RCAF airfield located south of Belleville, is utilized as a storage and overhaul facility of older aircraft. A new gravel runway was constructed in 2006 to train Canadian Forces CC-130 Hercules aircraft crew in landing on unprepared landing strips. The Canadian Forces have also established a drop zone nearby. The detachment is also home to the Mountain View Cadet Flying Training Centre, cadet training centre for the Royal Canadian Air Cadets.

=== Trenton Cadet Training Centre ===
The Trenton Cadet Training Centre (CTC) is one of the oldest cadet training centres in Canada. At this CTC, there are cadet courses offered for all three elements of Army, Sea and Air that are offered all year around. This portion of the base, located on the south side of the airbase, has multiple buildings for cadets to reside in during their summer training.

=== Other ===
- The National Air Force Museum of Canada is on the base.
- Trenton Military VOLMET Military Aeronautical Communications System (MACS) on 6754 and 15,034 kHz USB call sign "CHR"
- The base hosts a bomb disposal team.

== Economic impact on Trenton community ==
CFB Trenton, based on statistical data from the Fiscal Year 2004–2005, had an annual population impact (Regular Force members & dependants) of 8,185. The airbase also had an estimated local spending impact (direct and indirect) of $278,195,000 for that Fiscal Year. The airbase also directly employed 3,163 people and indirectly employed 437 people.

== See also ==
- CFD Mountain View
