= Trenton/Mountain View Airport =

Airport in Ontario, Canada

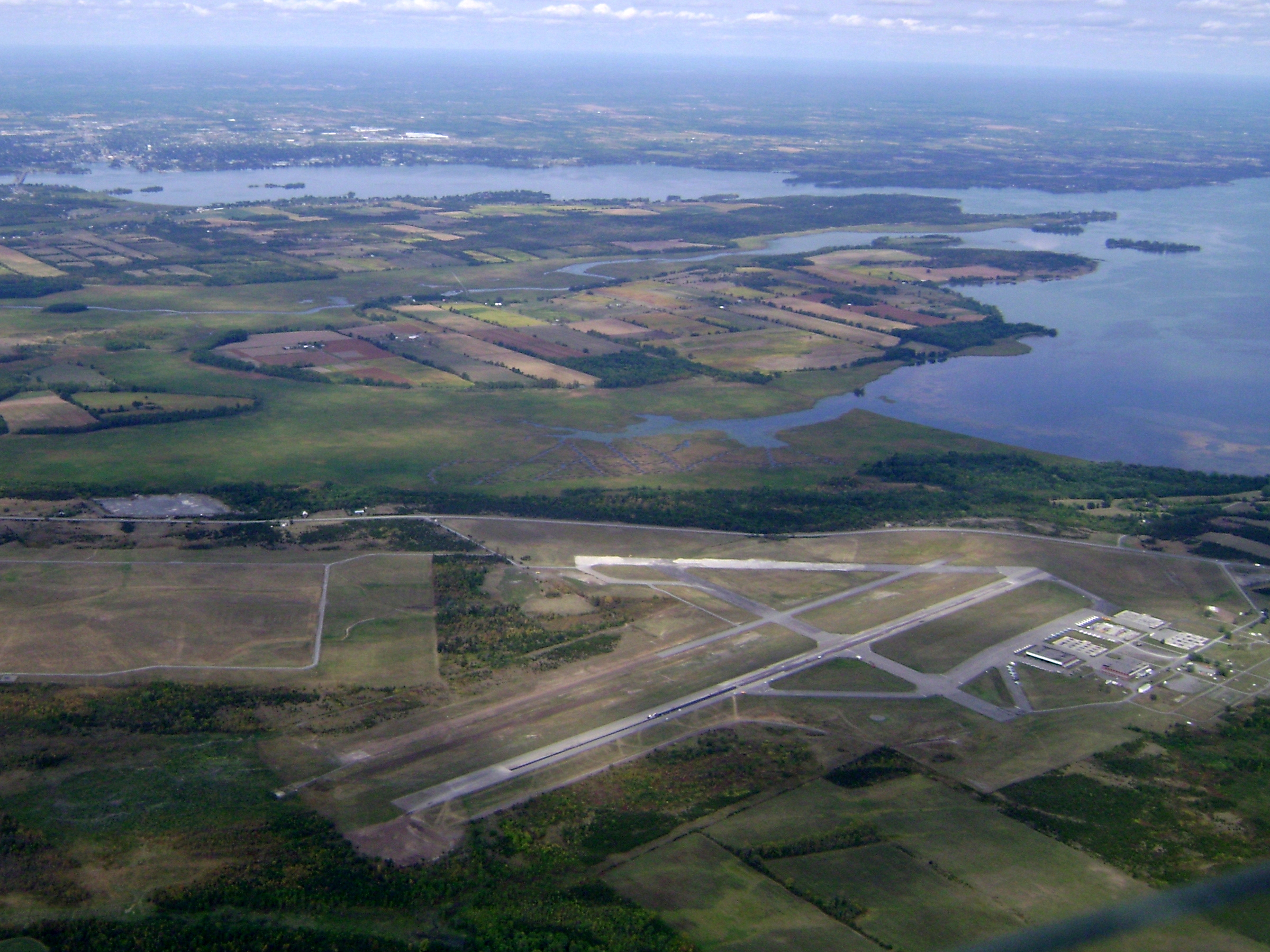
- IATA: none; ICAO: none; TC LID: CPZ3

Summary
- Airport type: Military
- Operator: DND
- Location: Mountain View, Ontario
- Time zone: EST (UTC−05:00)
  - Summer (DST): EDT (UTC−04:00)
- Elevation AMSL: 362 ft / 110 m
- Coordinates: 44°04′12″N 077°20′22″W

Map
- Location in Ontario

Runways
Direction	Length		Surface
Direction	ft	m	Surface
06R/24L	4,973	1,516	Asphalt
06L/24R	4,797	1,462	Gravel
16/34	3,004	916	Crushed concrete/asphalt
- Source: Canada Flight Supplement

Trenton/Mountain View Airport (TC LID: CPZ3) is located 5.2 nautical miles (9.6 km; 6.0 mi) southeast of Mountain View, Ontario, Canada.

The airport serves as a Royal Canadian Air Cadets flying centre from May until October and as a flight training centre from June until the end of August each summer. Stored at Canadian Forces Detachment Mountain View, a geographically separated detachment of CFB Trenton located at the airport, are retired Royal Canadian Air Force (RCAF) aircraft. A dismantled de Havilland Canada CC-115 Buffalo is located here.

A new gravel runway (06L/24R) was constructed in 2006 to train RCAF Lockheed CC-130 Hercules aircraft crews in landing on unprepared landing strips.

== See also ==
- CFD Mountain View
