= Bristol Bolingbroke =

World War II Canadian patrol aircraft

Bolingbroke
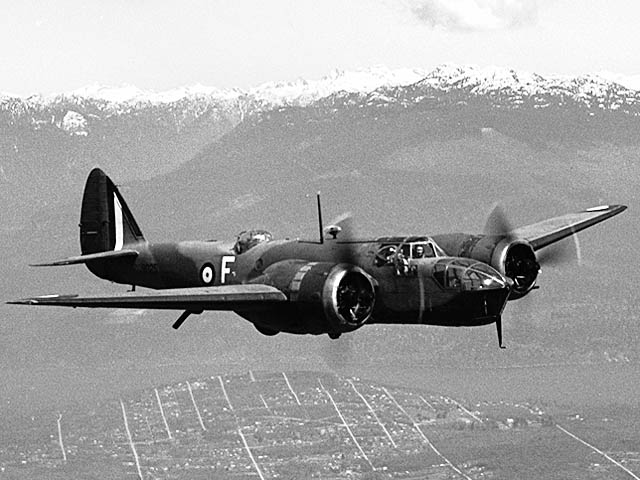
- Bolingbroke

General information
- Type: Maritime patrol aircraft/trainer
- National origin: United Kingdom /Canada
- Manufacturer: Bristol Aeroplane Company; Fairchild Aircraft Ltd. (Canada)
- Primary user: Royal Canadian Air Force
- Number built: 626

History
- Manufactured: 1939–1943
- Introduction date: 15 November 1939
- First flight: 14 September 1939
- Developed from: Bristol Blenheim

The Bristol Fairchild Bolingbroke is a maritime patrol aircraft and trainer used by the Royal Canadian Air Force during the Second World War. Produced by Fairchild-Canada, it was a license-built version of the Bristol Blenheim Mk IV bomber.

== Design and development ==
In 1935, the British Air Ministry issued Specification G.24/35 to procure a coastal reconnaissance/light bomber to replace the Avro Anson. Bristol proposed the Type 149, based on its Blenheim Mk I, with Bristol Aquila engines to give greater range. While the Air Ministry rejected this proposal, a Blenheim Mk I, retaining its Mercury VIII engines, was converted as a Type 149 (Blenheim Mk III) for the general reconnaissance role. The nose was lengthened to provide more room for the bombardier, with the upper left surface of the nose being scooped out to maintain pilot visibility during takeoff and landing.

The longer range also fulfilled a Canadian requirement for a maritime patrol aircraft. Consequently, Fairchild Aircraft Ltd. (Canada) of Quebec started production of the Blenheim Mk IV as the Bolingbroke (the originally intended name for the Blenheim IV). This type was nicknamed the "Bolly". After a small run of aircraft constructed to British specifications, as the Bolingbroke Mk I, Fairchild switched production to the Bolingbroke Mk IV with Canadian and American instruments and equipment. These versions also included anti-icing boots and a dinghy. One of the early Mk IV variants was the Bolingbroke Mk IVW which was powered by two 825 hp (615 kW) Pratt & Whitney SB4G Twin Wasp Junior engines. Incapable of maintaining altitude on one engine, the normal bomb load was reduced to 500 pounds on these aircraft to compensate for the low engine power. The most-produced variant was the Bolingbroke Mk IVT trainer, of which 457 were completed. A total of 626 Bolingbrokes were produced.

== Operational history ==
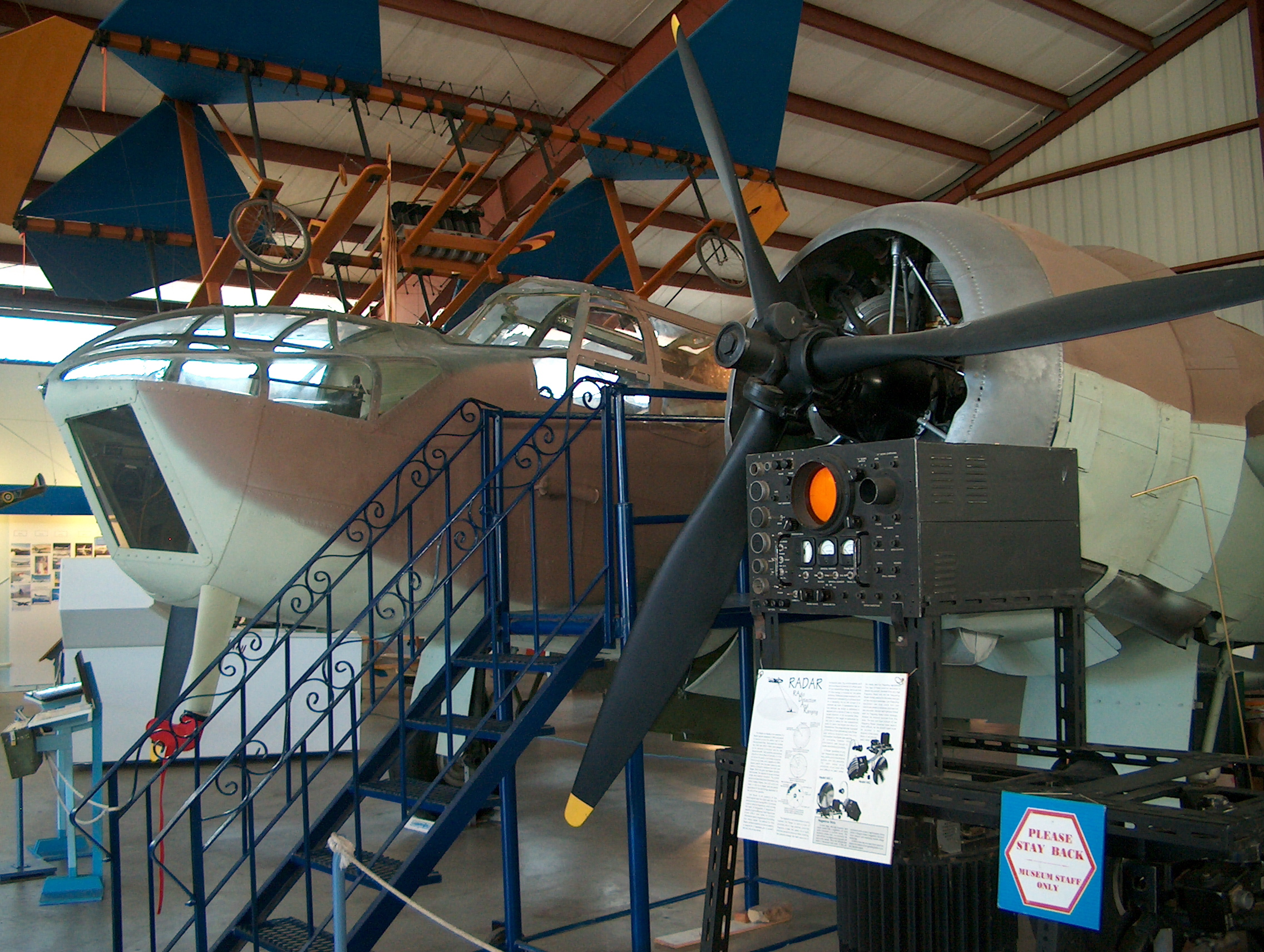
Bristol Bolingbroke IV at the British Columbia Aviation Museum, North Saanich, British Columbia, adjacent to Victoria International Airport

Most of the 151 Mk IVs built served in their intended role as patrol bombers on the Atlantic and Pacific coasts of Canada between 1940 and 1944. Two squadrons of these aircraft also served in Alaska during the Aleutians campaign. The Mk IVT trainers saw extensive use in the British Commonwealth Air Training Plan (BCATP).

== Variants ==
Bolingbroke Mk I
Twin-engine maritime patrol bomber aircraft, powered by two Bristol Mercury VIII radial piston engines, with British equipment. 18 built.
Bolingbroke Mk II
Conversion of fifth Mk I with US equipment - prototype of Mk IV.
Bolingbroke Mk III
Floatplane conversion of sixteenth Bolingbroke Mk I, with two Edo floats.
Bolingbroke Mk IV
Twin-engine maritime patrol bomber aircraft, equipped with anti-icing boots and a dinghy, also fitted with American and Canadian instruments and equipment, powered by two Bristol Mercury XV radial piston engines, 134 built.
Bolingbroke Mk IVW
Sub-version of Mk IV powered by two 825 hp (615 kW) Pratt & Whitney SB4G Twin Wasp Junior radial piston engines as contingency against possible shortages of Mercury engines. The Mk IVW's performance was below that of the Mk IV and the supply of the British engines was maintained so production returned to the Mk IV after only 15 aircraft were built.
Bolingbroke Mk IVC
Version of Mk IV with 900 hp (671 kW) Wright R-1820 Cyclone engines not requiring high octane fuel. One built.
Bolingbroke Mk IVT
Multi-purpose trainer aircraft. A total of 350 built powered by Mercury XV engines, followed by a further 107 powered by the low-octane fuel Mercury XX* engine, giving a total of 457 built, with a further 51 cancelled. Six Mk IVT were converted to dual controls. A further 89 were converted to Mk IVTT Target Tug with the addition of winching gear in the rear cabin and target drogue storage in the bomb bay.

== Operators ==
Canada

- Royal Canadian Air Force
  - Operational Squadrons of the Home War Establishment (HWE):
    - No. 8 Squadron RCAF - Used Bolingbroke Mk I and Mk IV (Dec 40 – Aug 43)
    - No. 115 Squadron RCAF - Used Bolingbroke Mk I (Aug 41 to Dec 41) and Mk IV (Nov 41 – Aug 43)
    - No. 119 Squadron RCAF - Used Bolingbroke Mk I (Aug 40 - Aug 41), Mk IVW (Aug–Nov 41) and Mk IV (Nov 41 – Jun 42)
    - No. 147 Squadron RCAF - Used Bolingbroke Mk I and Mk IV (Jul 42 – Mar 44)
  - The following HWE squadrons only had small numbers of Bolingbrokes on strength:
    - No. 13 (OT) Squadron RCAF - Used Bolingbroke Mk IV (Oct 41 – Jun 42)
    - No. 121 (K) Squadron RCAF - Used Bolingbroke Mk IVTT (Target Tug) (Aug 42 – May 44)
    - No. 122 (K) Squadron RCAF - Used Bolingbroke Mk IVTT (Target Tug) (Aug 42 – Sep 45)
    - No. 163 (AC) Squadron RCAF - Used Bolingbroke Mk IV (Mar–Jun 43)
    - (BR)-Bomber Reconnaissance; (OT)-Operational Training; (K)-Auxiliary; (AC)-Army Co-operation
- British Commonwealth Air Training Plan (BCATP)
  - Bombing and Gunnery Schools
    - No. 1 B&G School - Jarvis, Ontario, Used Bolingbroke IVT (Aug 40 – Feb 45)
    - No. 2 B&G School - Mossbank, Saskatchewan, Used Bolingbroke IVT (Oct 40 – Dec 44)
    - No. 3 B&G School - Macdonald, Manitoba, Used Anson, Battle, Bolingbroke IVT and Lysander, (Mar 41 – Feb 45)
    - No. 4 B&G School - Fingal, Ontario, Used Bolingbroke IVT (Nov 40 – Feb 45)
    - No. 5 B&G School - Dafoe, Saskatchewan, Used Bolingbroke IVT (Apr 41 – Feb 45)
    - No. 6 B&G School - Mountain View, Ontario, Used Bolingbroke IVT (Jun 41 – Post War)
    - No. 7 B&G School - Paulson, Manitoba, Used Bolingbroke IVT (Jun 41 – Feb 45)
    - No. 8 B&G School - Lethbridge, Alberta, Used Bolingbroke IVT (Oct 41 – Dec 44)
    - No. 9 B&G School - Mont-Joli, Quebec, Used Bolingbroke IVT (Dec 41 – Apr 45)
    - No. 10 B&G School - Mount Pleasant, Prince Edward Island, Used Bolingbroke IVT (Sep 43 - Jun 45)
    - No. 31 B&G School (RAF) - Picton, Ontario, Used Bolingbroke IVT (Apr 41 - Nov 44) — currently Picton Airport

== Surviving aircraft ==
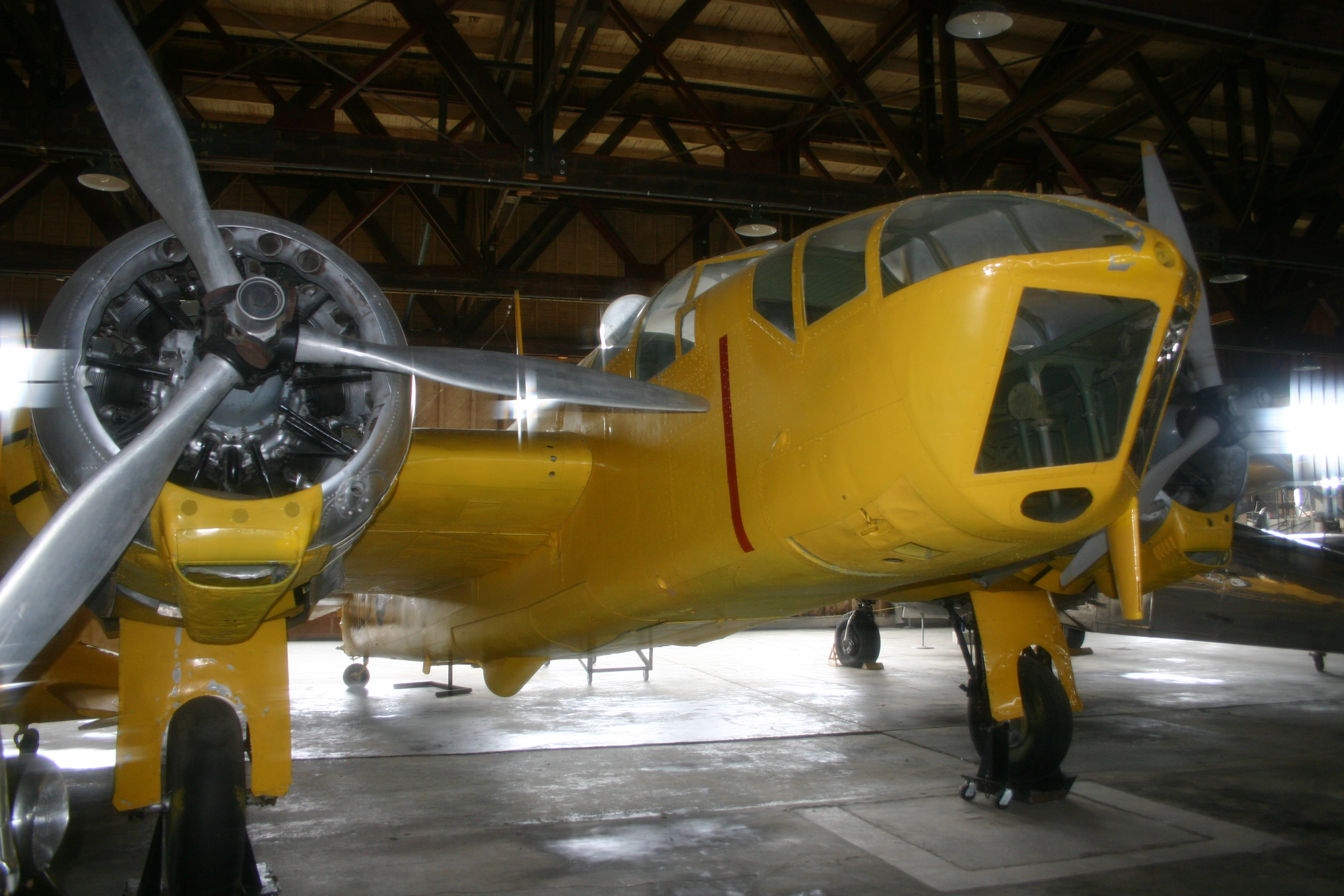
Bolingbroke IVT in the Commonwealth Air Training Plan Museum, Brandon, Manitoba

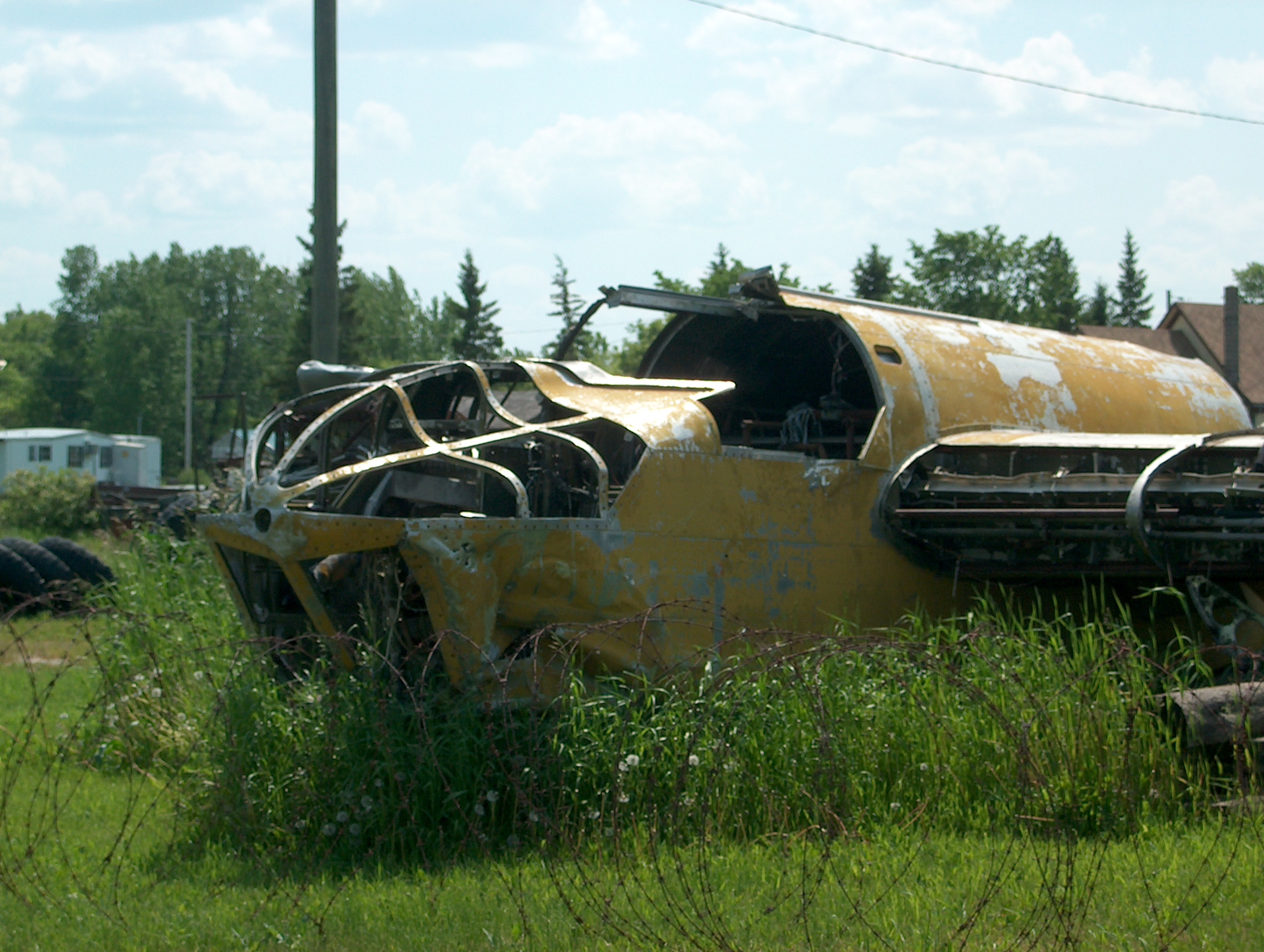
Bolingbroke in a Manitoba junkyard, 2006

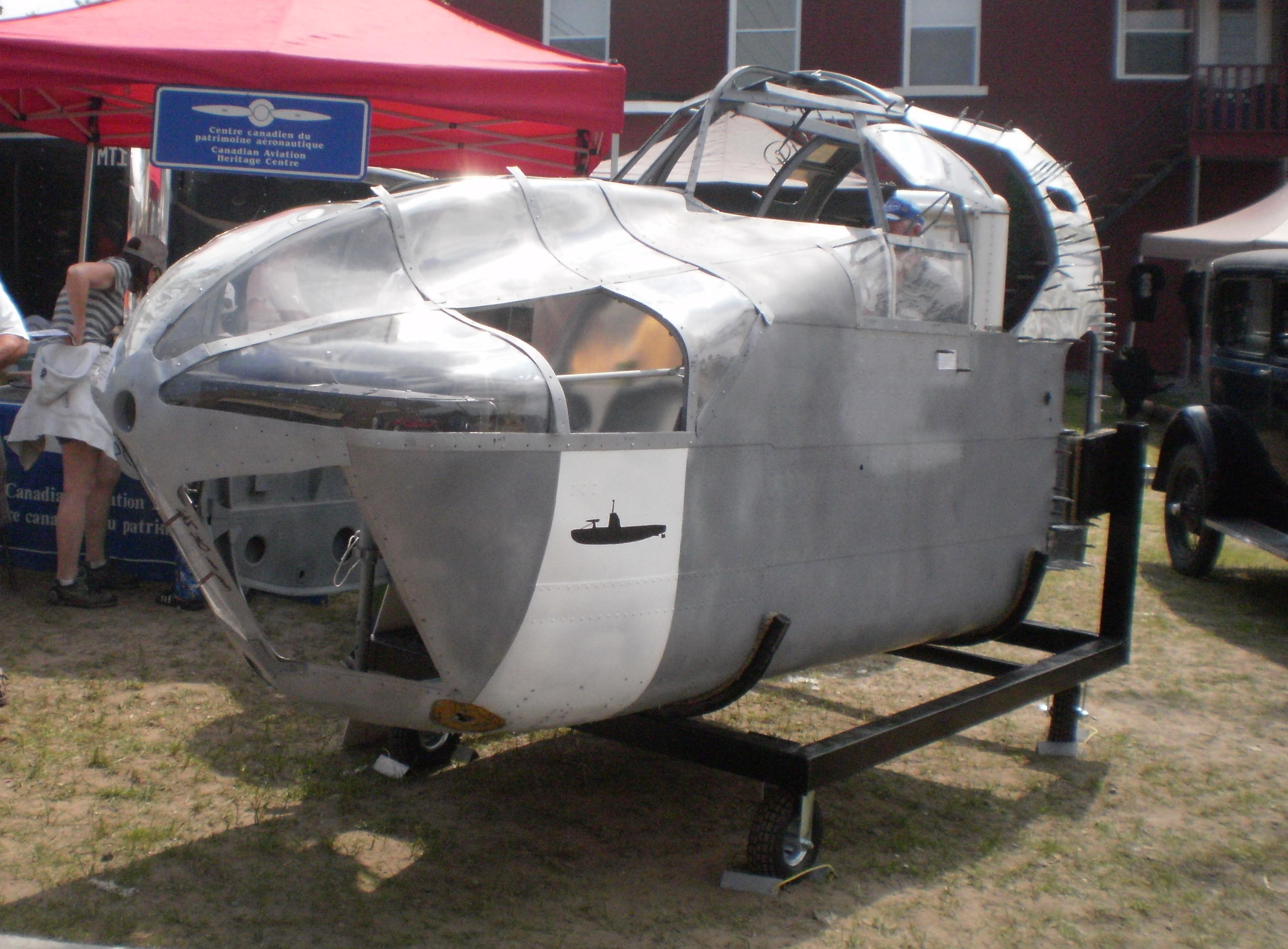
Part of a Bristol Fairchild Bolingbroke at a car show in Sainte-Anne-de-Bellevue, Quebec, 2011

Belgium

- 9895 – Mk. IVT on static display at the Royal Museum of the Armed Forces and of Military History in Brussels. It includes parts from 10038.

Canada

- 9059 – Mk. IV on static display at the Commonwealth Air Training Plan Museum in Brandon, Manitoba.
- 9869 – Mk. IVT in storage at the Royal Aviation Museum of Western Canada in Winnipeg, Manitoba.
- 9887 – Mk. IV under restoration to static condition at 17 Wing Winnipeg in Winnipeg, Manitoba. It was donated from a farm in 2013.
- 9892 – Mk. IVT on static display at the Canada Aviation and Space Museum in Ottawa, Ontario.
- 9896 - Mk. IVT partial aircraft in storage and restored nose section on display at the Canadian Museum of Flight in Langley, British Columbia.
- 9904 – Mk. IVT in storage at the Reynolds-Alberta Museum in Wetaskiwin, Alberta.
- 9944 – Mk. IVT on static display with the Commonwealth Air Training Plan Museum in Brandon, Manitoba. This aircraft is displayed next to the Trans-Canada Highway in Brandon.
- 9987 – Mk. IV on static display at the Bomber Command Museum of Canada in Nanton, Alberta.
- 9997 – Mk. IVT under restoration to static display at the Greenwood Military Aviation Museum in Greenwood, Nova Scotia.
- 10121 – Mk. IVT under restoration to static display at the Canadian Aviation Heritage Centre in Sainte-Anne-de-Bellevue, Quebec.
- Composite – Mk. IV on static display at the British Columbia Aviation Museum in Victoria, British Columbia. It is a combination of two different airframes.
- Composite – Mk. IVT under restoration to ground running condition at the Canadian Warplane Heritage Museum in Hamilton, Ontario. It is a combination of eight different airframes.

United Kingdom

- 9048 – Mk. IV under restoration to static display at Aerospace Bristol in Filton, Gloucestershire.
- 9893 - Mk IVT Part restored fuselage on static display at the South Yorkshire Aircraft Museum, Doncaster.
- 9940 – Mk. IVT on static display at the National Museum of Flight in East Fortune, East Lothian. It uses the outer wings of 9059.
- 10001 – Mk. IVT on static display at the Royal Air Force Museum Midlands at RAF Cosford. It has been restored as a Blenheim and is painted as L8756 "XD-E" of 139 Squadron RAF.
- 10038 – Mk. IVT in storage at Duxford Airfield in Duxford, Cambridgeshire. It was severely damaged in a crash in Denham Aerodrome on 21 June 1987.
- 10201 – Mk. IVT airworthy with the Aircraft Restoration Company in Duxford, Cambridgeshire. It was restored as a Blenheim Mk.1F, using a Blenheim Mk I nose which had previously been converted to a car. It is registered as G-BPIV.

United States

- 9983 – Mk. IVT in storage at Fantasy of Flight in Polk City, Florida.
- 10076 – Mk. IV on static display at the Pima Air & Space Museum in Tucson, Arizona.

== Specifications (Bolingbroke Mk IV) ==
Data from War Planes of the Second World War: Volume Seven Bombers and Reconnaissance Aircraft

General characteristics

- Crew: 3
- Length: 42 ft 9 in (13.03 m)
- Wingspan: 56 ft 4 in (17.17 m)
- Height: 9 ft 10 in (3.00 m)
- Wing area: 469 sq ft (43.6 m^{2})
- Airfoil: root: RAF-28 (18%); tip: RAF-28 (10%)
- Empty weight: 9,835 lb (4,461 kg)
- Gross weight: 13,750 lb (6,237 kg)
- Max takeoff weight: 14,500 lb (6,577 kg)
- Powerplant: 2 × Bristol Mercury XV 9-cylinder air-cooled radial piston engines, 920 hp (690 kW) each at 9,250 ft (2,819 m)
- Propellers: 3-bladed variable-pitch propellers

Performance

- Maximum speed: 288 mph (463 km/h, 250 kn)
- Cruise speed: 200 mph (320 km/h, 170 kn)
- Range: 1,860 mi (2,990 km, 1,620 nmi)
- Service ceiling: 27,000 ft (8,200 m)
- Rate of climb: 1,480 ft/min (7.5 m/s)
- Wing loading: 29.3 lb/sq ft (143 kg/m^{2})
- Power/mass: 0.1338 hp/lb (0.2200 kW/kg)

Armament

- Guns: 1× fixed forward firing .303 in Browning machine gun and one .303 in Browning machine gun in power operated dorsal turret, alternately in the IVT, two Browning machine guns in a Bristol Type B1 Mk IV turret
- Bombs: 2× 500 lb (230 kg) or 4 × 250 lb (114 kg) bombs

== See also ==
Related development

- Bristol Blenheim
- Bristol Beaufort
- Bristol Beaufighter

Aircraft of comparable role, configuration, and era

- Douglas DB-7
- Dornier Do 17
- Heinkel He 111
- LeO 451
- Martin Maryland
- Potez 630
- PZL.37 Łoś
- Tupolev SB

Related lists

- List of aircraft of the Canadian Air Force
- List of Royal Canadian Air Force squadrons
- List of Royal Canadian Air Force stations
- List of bomber aircraft
