= List of Royal Flying Corps airfields =

The Royal Flying Corps (RFC) is a former corps-sized aviation component of the British Army; before and during the First World War. The RFC operated their aircraft from many different aerodromes and airfields, throughout all parts of the British Isles, along with sites in France, and other countries during the First World War.

When the Royal Air Force (RAF) was created on 1 April 1918, from the merging of the Royal Flying Corps with the Royal Naval Air Service (RNAS), airfields of the RFC (and the RNAS) were transferred to the control of the RAF.

The list below includes known airfields of the Royal Flying Corps during its existence.

== British Isles ==
Royal Flying Corps (RFC) aerodromes and airfields in Great Britain and Ireland
airfield or aerodrome location	from	to	present county of GB or IE	GB & IE country	RFC based units	current use
Andover Aerodrome	August 1917	1 April 1918	Hampshire	England		British Army Headquarters
Anwick Aerodrome	September 1916	1 April 1918	Lincolnshire	England		returned to farmland
Ashington Aerodrome	October 1916	1 April 1918	Northumberland	England		Potland Burn Surface Mine
Ayr Airfield	1917	1 April 1918	Ayrshire	Scotland		Ayr Racecourse
Bacton Aerodrome	1916	1 April 1918	Norfolk	England		now Bacton Gas Terminal
Baldonnel Aerodrome	1917	1 April 1918	Co. Dublin	Ireland		Irish Air Corps main operating base
Beaulieu Aerodrome	1914	1 April 1918	Hampshire	England		open land, part of the Beaulieu Palace House estate
Beaumont Aerodrome Night Landing Ground	April 1916	August 1916	Essex	England		farmland
Beddington Aerodrome	January 1916	1 April 1918	Greater London	England		airfield is open common, surrounded by housing
Bekesbourne Aerodrome	1916	1 April 1918	Kent	England		housing and farmland
Beverley Aerodrome	1916	1 April 1918	East Yorkshire	England		Beverley Racecourse
Bicester Aerodrome	January 1917	1 April 1918	Oxfordshire	England		Bicester Airfield
Biggin Hill Aerodrome	1916	1 April 1918	Greater London	England		London Biggin Hill Airport
Blackheath Common Night Landing Ground	March 1915	July 1919	Essex	England		farmland (army)
Bogton Aerodrome	1917	1 April 1918	Ayrshire	Scotland		
Boscombe Down Aerodrome	1917	1 April 1918	Wiltshire	England		prev. RAF Boscombe Down, now MOD Boscombe Down, occupied by RAF, ETPS, and QinetiQ
Bournes Green Landing Ground	May 1917	June 1917	Essex	England		farmland
Bracebridge Heath Landing Ground	1918	1 April 1918	Lincolnshire	England		industry / agriculture
Braceby Aerodrome Landing Ground	1916	1 April 1918	Lincolnshire	England		
Braintree Aerodrome Night Landing Ground	end of January 1917	October 1918	Essex	England		farmland / housing estate roads
Bramham Moor Aerodrome	1915	1 April 1918	Yorkshire	England		farmland
Brattleby (Cliff) Aerodrome	1916	1917	Lincolnshire	England		RAF Scampton (Ex-617 Sqn 'Dambusters', Ex-Red Arrows)
Brentingby Aerodrome	1916	1916	Leicestershire	England		farmland
Brooklands Aerodrome Landing Ground	1914	1 April 1918	Surrey	England		Brooklands Museum
Broomfield Court Aerodrome Night Landing Ground	August 1916	August 1919	Essex	England		farmland
Brough Aerodrome Landing Ground	1916	1916	East Yorkshire	England		
Buckminster Aerodrome	1 October 1916	1 April 1918	Lincolnshire	England		farmland
Burgh Castle Aerodrome Landing Ground	1915	1 April 1918	Suffolk	England		
Burnham-on-Crouch Aerodrome FS	1915	July 1919	Essex	England		farmland
Bury / Ramsey Aerodrome	September 1917	1 April 1918	Cambridgeshire	England		farmland, housing, industry
Bury St Edmunds Aerodrome Landing Ground	1916	1916	Suffolk	England		industrial estate
Calshot Naval Air Station	29 March 1913	July 1914	Isle of Wight	England		Calshot Activities Centre
Castle Bromwich Aerodrome	1918	1 April 1918	West Midlands	England		industry, housing
Catterick Aerodrome	September 1914	1 April 1918	North Yorkshire	England		Marne Barracks
Chattis Hill Aerodrome	1917	1918	Hampshire	England		
Chiddingstone Causeway Aerodrome	December 1916	1 April 1918	Kent	England		common land
Chingford Aerodrome FS	December 1914	March 1919	Essex	England		reservoirs
Clacton Seaplane Station	August 1914	Autumn 1916	Essex	England		tourist seafront, Clacton Airshow focal point
Coal Aston Aerodrome	1916	1 April 1918	Yorkshire	England		
Collinstown Aerodrome		1 April 1918	Co. Dublin	Ireland		Dublin Airport
Copmanthorpe Aerodrome	1916	1 April 1918	North Yorkshire	England		
Coventry (Radford Aerodrome)	1916	1 April 1918	Warwickshire	England		
Cramlington Aerodrome	1915	1 April 1918	Northumberland	England		
Curragh Camp Aerodrome	1913	1 April 1918	Co. Kildare	Ireland		Irish Army barracks
Detling Aerodrome	1917	1 April 1918	Kent	England		
Didsbury Aerodrome	1917	1 April 1918	Lancashire	England		
Doncaster Aerodrome	1916	1918	South Yorkshire	England		Doncaster Racecourse
Dover Aerodrome (Swingate Down)	1914	1 April 1918	Kent	England		
Earsham Aerodrome	1916	1918	Norfolk	England		farmland
Eastburn Aerodrome	1917	1 April 1918	East Yorkshire	England		RAF Driffield, then Alamein Barracks
Easington Airfield	Oct 1916	Mar 1919	Co. Durham	England		farmland
Easthorpe Airfield	April 1916	December 1919	Essex	England		farmland
Eastleigh Aerodrome	1910	1 April 1918	Hampshire	England		Southampton Airport
Easton-on-the-Hill Aerodrome	1917	1 April 1918	Northamptonshire	England		RAF Wittering (flying)
East Hanningfield Aerodrome Night Landing Ground	April 1916	January 1917	Essex	England		farmland
East Retford Airfield	1916	1 April 1918	Nottinghamshire	England		
Edzell Aerodrome	1916	1 April 1918	Angus	Scotland		farmland
Elmswell Aerodrome (Great Ashfield)	1917	1 April 1918	Suffolk	England		
Elsham Airfield	1916	1 April 1918	Lincolnshire	England		farmland / industrial estate
Fairlop Aerodrome FS	1916	summer 1919	Essex	England		sports fields, car sales, WW1 officers' bungalows remain
Farnborough Aerodrome	1912	1 April 1918	Hampshire	England		Farnborough Airport
Feltwell Airfield	1917	1 April 1918	Norfolk	England		
Fermoy Aerodrome	1917	1 April 1918	Co. Cork	Ireland		
Filton Airfield	1915	1 April 1918	Gloucestershire	England		Bristol Filton Airport
Finningley Airfield	1915	1 April 1918	South Yorkshire	England		Robin Hood Airport Doncaster Sheffield
Folkestone / Hawkinge Aerodrome	1915	1 April 1918	Kent	England		housing, Kent Battle of Britain Museum
Ford Farm / Old Sarum	August 1917	1 April 1918	Wiltshire	England		Old Sarum Airfield
Ford (Junction) / Yapton Aerodrome	1 March 1918	1 April 1918	West Sussex	England		HM Prison Ford
Fyfield Aerodrome Night Landing Ground	October 1916	December 1919	Essex	England		farmland
Goldhanger Aerodrome FS	August 1915	March 1919	Essex	England		farmland
Goldington Aerodrome	October 1916	1 April 1918	Bedfordshire	England		housing
Gormanstown Aerodrome	1917	1 April 1918	Co. Meath	Ireland		Gormanston Camp Irish Army barracks
Gosberton Airfield	1 October 1916	1 April 1918	Lincolnshire	England		
Gosport Aerodrome, Fort Grange	July 1914	1 April 1918	Hampshire	England		HMS Sultan
Goxhill Airfield	?	1 April 1918	Lincolnshire	England		farmland, industrial estate
Grantham Aerodrome	1915	1 April 1918	Lincolnshire	England		Prince William of Gloucester Barracks
Hainault Farm Aerodrome FS	October 1914	December 1919	was Essex, now Greater London	England		farmland
Halton Aerodrome	1917	1 April 1918	Buckinghamshire	England		RAF Halton (recruit basic training, NCO training, flying)
Harpswell Aerodrome	1916	1 April 1918	Lincolnshire	England		farmland, museum
Harlaxton Aerodrome	Nov 1916	1 April 1918	Lincolnshire	England		farmland
Harrietsham Aerodrome	December 1916	?	Kent	England		?
Helperby (Brafferton) Airfield	1916	1920	North Yorkshire	England		farmland
Hendon Aerodrome	November 1916	1 April 1918	Greater London	England		Royal Air Force Museum London, housing
Heathfield Airfield	1917	1 April 1918	Ayrshire	Scotland		housing, retail
Hingham Airfield	1916	1917	Norfolk	England		
Hooton Park Aerodrome	1917	1 April 1918	Cheshire	England		museum, Vauxhall car factory
Horndon-on-the-Hill Aerodrome	April 1916	early 1918	Essex	England		farmland
Hove Aerodrome			East Sussex	England		
Hucknall Aerodrome	1916	1 April 1918	Nottinghamshire	England		housing
Hounslow Heath Aerodrome	14 October 1914	1 April 1918	Greater London	England		common land
Hylton Aerodrome	October 1916	1 April 1918	Tyne & Wear	England		Nissan car factory, North East Land, Sea and Air Museums
Jesson (Hythe Aerodrome)	September 1916	1 April 1918	Kent	England		farmland
Joyce Green Aerodrome	14 July 1911	December 1919	Kent	England		common land
Kenley Aerodrome	1917	1 April 1918	Greater London	England		RAF Kenley
Lake Down Aerodrome	1917	1919	Wiltshire	England		common land
Larkhill Aerodrome	1912	1914	Wiltshire	England		Larkhill Garrison, MOD land: artillery training (part of the Salisbury Plain Training Area)
Leadenham Aerodrome	September 1916	1 April 1918	Lincolnshire	England		farmland, quarry
Leavesden Aerodrome			Hertfordshire	England		Warner Bros. Studios, Leavesden, housing
Leighterton Aerodrome	1916	1918	Gloucestershire	England		farmland, Commonwealth War Graves Commission 24-grave cemetery
Lilbourne Aerodrome	1915	1 April 1918	Warwickshire	England		common land
Little Clacton Night Landing Ground	October 1916	July 1919	Essex	England		sports grounds, housing
London Colney Aerodrome	1916	1 April 1918	Hertfordshire	England		De Havilland Aircraft Museum
Lopcombe Corner Aerodrome	1917	1 April 1918	Wiltshire	England		
Lydd St Mary	1917	1 April 1918	Kent	England		
Lympne Aerodrome	1916	1 April 1918	Kent	England		
Manston Aerodrome	1915	1 April 1918	Kent	England		Manston Airport
Manton Aerodrome	December 1916	1 April 1918	Lincolnshire	England		farmland
Marden Airfield	January 1917	1 April 1918	Kent	England		farmland
Marham Aerodrome	1916	1 April 1918	Norfolk	England		RAF Marham (flying)
Marske Aerodrome	December 1917	1 April 1918	North Yorkshire	England		housing
Martlesham Heath Aerodrome	October 1916	1 April 1918	Suffolk	England		BT Research Adastral Park, retail park, housing
Mattishall Aerodrome	1915	1 April 1918	Norfolk	England		
Melton Mowbray Aerodrome	1916	1 April 1918	Leicestershire	England		
Mill Farm Night Landing Ground	1917	1 April 1918	Lincolnshire	England		farmland
Molesworth Aerodrome	1917	1 April 1918	Cambridgeshire	England		RAF Molesworth (USAF non-flying base)
Montrose Aerodrome	26 February 1913	1 April 1918	Angus	Scotland		Montrose Air Station Heritage Centre
Mountnessing Night Landing Ground	April 1916	December 1916	Essex	England		farmland
Narborough Aerodrome	August 1915	1 April 1918	Norfolk	England		farmland
Netheravon Aerodrome	16 June 1913	1 April 1918	Wiltshire	England		AAC Netheravon until 2012, Army Parachute Assn, UK Armed Forces Rally Team, Royal Navy Skydiving
North Benfleet Night Landing Ground	April 1916	March 1919	Essex	England		farmland, new arterial road
North Coates Fitties	1916	1 April 1918	Lincolnshire	England		farmland, housing, North Coates Flying Club
North Killingholme Aerodrome	July 1914	1 April 1918	Lincolnshire	England		farmland, industry
North Ockendon Night Landing Ground	April 1916	October 1916	Essex	England		farmland
North Weald FS	April 1916	December 1919	Essex	England		post-WW1 RAF, private flying, markets
Northolt Aerodrome	3 May 1915	1 April 1918	Greater London	England		RAF Northolt Command Support Air Transport
Orsett Night Landing Ground	October 1916	December 1919	Essex	England		farmland, housing, golf course
Perton Aerodrome	1916	1 April 1918	Staffordshire	England		housing
Plungar Aerodrome			Leicestershire	England		
Redcar Aerodrome	1915	1 April 1918	North Yorkshire	England		housing
Red House Farm Aerodrome	1917	1 April 1918	Wiltshire	England		MOD Boscombe Down, ETPS, QinetiQ
Rendcomb Aerodrome	early 1916	1 April 1918	Gloucestershire	England		Sold in 1920, returned to farmland. Purchased in 1992, restored to WW1-era heritage, HQ of AeroSuperBatics.
Ripon Aerodrome	15 September 1916	1 April 1918	North Yorkshire	England		Ripon Racecourse
Rochford FS	Autumn 1915	1920	Essex	England		private airfield
Runwell Night Landing Ground	August 1917	March 1920	Essex	England		farmland
Sadberge Landing Ground			Co. Durham	England		farmland
Saundby Aerodrome (Gainsborough)	December 1916	1 April 1918	Nottinghamshire	England		farmland
Scalford Aerodrome	1916	1 April 1918	Leicestershire	England		
Seaton Carew Aerodrome	1916	1 April 1918	Co. Durham	England		industrial estate
Sedgeford Aerodrome	1916	1 April 1918	Norfolk	England		farmland
Shawbury Aerodrome	1917	1 April 1918	Shropshire	England		RAF Shawbury (Defence Helicopter Flying School)
Shenfield (Palmers Farm) Night Landing Ground	September 1916	February 1919	Essex	England		farmland
Shotwick Aerodrome	1916	1 April 1918	Flintshire	Wales		MoD Sealand (non-flying)
Sible Hedingham Night Landing Ground	April 1916	June 1919	Essex	England		farmland
South Carlton Airfield	November 1916	1 April 1918	Lincolnshire	England		farmland
Southfields Aerodrome	1916	1 April 1918	Northumberland	England		HM Prisons Acklington & Castington
Stirling Aerodrome	1916	1918	Stirling	Scotland		farmland
Stow Maries Aerodrome	August 1916	March 1919	Essex	England		Stow Maries Aerodrome heritage site
Sutton's Farm FS	summer 1915	June 1919	was Essex, now Greater London	England		housing, public open space
Swinstead Aerodrome			Leicestershire	England		
Tallaght Aerodrome		1918	South Dublin	Ireland		
Tangmere Aerodrome	1917	1 April 1918	West Sussex	England		Tangmere Military Aviation Museum
Thaxted Aerodrome Night Landing Ground	January 1917	summer 1918	Essex	England		farmland
Throwley Aerodrome	October 1916	1 April 1918	Kent	England		farmland
Ternhill Aerodrome	1916	1 April 1918	Shropshire	England		RAF Ternhill / Clive Barracks
Turnberry Aerodrome	1917	1 April 1918	Ayrshire	Scotland		Turnberry Golf Course
Turnhouse Aerodrome	1915	1 April 1918	City of Edinburgh	Scotland		Edinburgh Airport
Tydd St Mary	August 1917	1 April 1918	Lincolnshire	England		farmland
Upavon Aerodrome	19 June 1912	1 April 1918	Wiltshire	England	3 Sqn RFC	Upavon Station, Trenchard Lines / Upavon Airfield
Uxbridge Aerodrome	19 November 1917	1 April 1918	Greater London	England		RAF Uxbridge, housing
Vale Farm, Thornaby (Yarm)	1914	1 April 1918	North Yorkshire	England		housing, industry
Waddington Aerodrome	1916	1 April 1918	Lincolnshire	England		RAF Waddington (AWACS [former], RAF Red Arrows)
Waddon Aerodrome	1918	1 April 1918	Greater London	England		housing
Wellingore Heath Aerodrome	1917	1 April 1918	Lincolnshire	England		farmland
West Fenton Aerodrome (Gullane)	1916	1 April 1918	East Lothian	Scotland		museum
Weston-on-the-Green Aerodrome	1916	1 April 1918	Oxfordshire	England		RAF Weston-on-the-Green (flying)
Widford Night Landing Ground	December 1914	summer 1916	Essex	England		farmland, industry
Stamford Aerodrome	1916	1 April 1918	Lincolnshire	England		RAF Wittering (flying)
Wormingford Aerodrome Night Landing Ground	December 1916	June 1919	Essex	England		ex-WW2 airfield, gliding, farmland
Worthy Down Aerodrome	1917	1 April 1918	Hampshire	England		Worthy Down Barracks
Writtle Aerodrome Night Landing Ground	October 1914	November 1916	Essex	England		farmland, nurseries
Wye Aerodrome	May 1916	1 April 1918	Kent	England		farmland
Wyton Aerodrome	1916	1 April 1918	Huntingdonshire	England		RAF Wyton (flying)
Yatesbury Aerodrome	1916	1 April 1918	Wiltshire	England		
Yokes Court Aerodrome	February 1917	November 1917	Kent	England		
airfield or aerodrome location	from	to	present county of GB or IE	GB & IE country	RFC based units	current use

== France ==
- Saint-Omer, Pas-de-Calais, France, 1914 to 1918; Headquarters - now Saint-Omer Wizernes Airport and site of British Air Services Memorial
- Candas; No. 2 Aircraft Depot (2AD) formed 13 December 1915 to Spring 1918
- Fienvillers; No. 2 Aeroplane Supply Depot (2ASD) formed 1 November 1917
- Rang-du-Fliers; 2AD moved after the German Spring Offensive
- St Andre aux Bois / Verton; 2ASD moved after the German Spring Offensive
- Saint-Léger-lès-Authie
- Sombrin (Vaulx-Vraucourt)

== Canada ==
The Royal Flying Corps Canada (RFCC) was established by the RFC in 1917 to train aircrew in Canada. RFC / RFCC air stations were established in southern Ontario at the following locations:

- Camp Borden 1917 to 1918
- Armour Heights Field 1917 to 1918; pilot training, School of Special Flying to train instructors
- Leaside Aerodrome 1917 to 1918; Artillery Cooperation School
- Long Branch Aerodrome 1917 to 1918
- Curtiss School of Aviation; flying-boat station with temporary wooden hangar on the beach at Hanlan's Point on Toronto Island 1915 to 1918; main school, airstrip, and metal hangar facilities at Long Branch
- Camp Rathbun, Deseronto 1917 to 1918; pilot training
- Camp Mohawk (now Tyendinaga (Mohawk) Airport) 1917 to 1918; located at the Tyendinaga Indian Reserve (now Tyendinaga Mohawk Territory) near Belleville 1917 to 1918; pilot training
- Hamilton (Armament School) 1917 to 1918
- Beamsville Camp (School of Aerial Fighting) 1917 to 1918; located at 4222 Saan Road in Beamsville, Ontario; original hangar remains, and property now used by Global Horticultural Incorporated

== Other locations ==
- Ismailia, Egypt; training: No. 57 Training Squadron, 32 (Training) Wing HQ - now Al Ismailiyah Air Base
- Aboukir, Egypt 1916 to 1918; training: Nos. 22 and 23 Training Squadrons, 20 (Training) Wing HQ
- Abu Sueir, Egypt 1917 to 1918; training: Nos. 57 and 195 Training Squadrons - now Abu Suwayr Air Base, also used by the Royal Air Force during World War II
- El Ferdan, Egypt; training: No. 17 TDS
- El Rimal, Egypt 1917 to 1918; training: No. 19 TDS - later as RAF El Amiriya, abandoned after World War II
- Camp Taliaferro, North Texas, USA 1917 to 1918; training - sites now either residential development or commercial / industrial parks
