= De Lesseps Field =

Former airfield in Ontario, Canada

- IATA: none; ICAO: none

Summary
- Location: Toronto, Ontario, Canada
- Time zone: EST (UTC−05:00)
  - Summer (DST): EDT (UTC−04:00)
- Coordinates: 43°41′55.6″N 079°29′47.15″W

Map
- Location in Toronto

De Lesseps Field was a small, but important airfield in early aviation in Toronto, Ontario, Canada.

Opened sometime before 1910, an airfield was created from three farms by engineer William Griffith Trethewey (1865–1926). The airfield was located near present-day Hearst Circle and the Wishbone on a 600 acres (2.4 km^{2}) site in York Township (just outside Weston, Ontario).

The grassy airfield was later used by French aviator Count Jacques Benjamin de Lesseps (1883–1927) and later renamed after him. The property remained in the hands of the Trethewey family after the death of Trethewey, but in 1928 Trethewey's son Fred sold it to airline Skyways Limited. de Havilland Canada established their first home here in 1928 (building a small hangar) to build Gipsy Moth and Tiger Moth aircraft, but left for Downsview in 1929. Skyways remained owners until some time after 1931 and the airline moved to the Malton Airport. The farm and airfield was later re-developed as residential housing forming what is now the residential neighbourhood called Brookhaven-Amesbury. No trace of the airfield remains in the area.

Besides aircraft manufacturing, the airfield hosted air shows starting in 1910 (hosted by the Ontario Motor League).

This airfield was one of many airfields in the greater Toronto area during the early 20th Century, but most of the airfields disappeared before World War II:

- Armour Heights Field 1917–1919
- Barker Field 1927–1953
- Downsview Airfield 1929–2024
- Leaside Aerodrome 1927–1931
- Long Branch Aerodrome 1915–1919
- Toronto Aerodrome 1928–1939

Most of the airfield related buildings were temporary or converted from farm use. De Havilland's first factory was in an old vegetable warehouse because it had double doors wide enough to accommodate assembled aircraft. A larger hangar was built in 1929, but it was moved along with the aircraft manufacturer to Downsview.

The later owners of the airfield, Skyways Limited, used the facilities to train pilots.

== See also ==
- List of airports in the Greater Toronto Area
