= List of defunct airports in Canada =

This is an alphabetical list of abandoned airports in Canada that were at one time important enough to warrant an article. Most of these also appear in Category:Defunct airports in Canada. This list is sorted by province or territory.

== Alberta ==
List of airports in Alberta

- Acme Airport
- Andrew Airport
- Bjorgum Farm Airport
- Cadotte Airport
- Camrose/Marek Farms Aerodrome
- Caroline Aerodrome
- Cheadle Airport
- Chinchaga Airport
- RCAF Station Claresholm
- Conklin Airport
- Cowpar Airport
- Didsbury (Vertical Extreme Skydiving) Aerodrome
- Doig Airport
- Drumheller/Ostergard's Airport
- Edmonton City Centre Airport
- Edmonton/Lechelt Field Aerodrome
- Edmonton/St. Albert Airport
- Embarras Airport
- Empress North 6 (Plains Midstream Canada) Aerodrome
- Fitzgerald (Fort Smith) Water Aerodrome
- Fontas Airport
- Forestburg Airport
- Fort Chipewyan/Small Lake Water Aerodrome
- Fort McMurray/Mildred Lake Airport
- RCAF Aerodrome Frank Lake
- Glendon Airport
- Grande Cache Airport
- Grist Lake Airport
- Hamburg Aerodrome
- High Level/Footner Lake Water Aerodrome
- Irma Airport
- RCAF Station High River
- Lethbridge/Anderson Aerodrome
- Liege/CNRL Aerodrome
- RCAF Station Lincoln Park
- Milk River (Madge) Airport
- Millet/Creekview Aerodrome
- Morley Air Station
- Olds/North 40 Ranch Aerodrome
- RCAF Station Pearce
- RCAF Station Penhold
- Red Deer/South 40 Airstrip
- St. Francis Airport
- St. Lina Aerodrome
- Steen River Airport
- Steen Tower Airport
- Turner Valley Bar N Ranch Airport
- Viking (South) Aerodrome
- RCAF Station Vulcan
- Zama Airport
- Zama Lake Airport

== British Columbia ==
List of airports in British Columbia

- Alice Arm/Silver City Water Aerodrome
- Barkerville Airport
- Bronson Creek Airport
- Brucejack/Bowser Aerodrome
- CFB Chilliwack
- Clinton/Bleibler Ranch Aerodrome
- Crawford Bay Airport
- Dawson Creek Water Aerodrome
- Dean River Airport
- RCAF Aerodrome - Dog Creek
- Eddontenajon/Iskut Village Airport
- Esquimalt Airport
- Finlay Bay Water Aerodrome
- Fort Grahame Water Aerodrome
- Fort Nelson/Mobil Sierra Airport
- Fort St. John (Charlie Lake) Water Aerodrome
- Fort St. John/Tompkins Mile 54 Airport
- Gang Ranch Airport
- Kahntah Aerodrome
- Canadian Forces Station Ladner
- Mayne Island Water Aerodrome
- Minoru Park
- Minstrel Island Water Aerodrome
- Mission Water Aerodrome
- Nanaimo/Long Lake Water Airport
- Peggo Devon Canada Aerodrome
- Penticton Water Aerodrome
- Poplar Beach Resort Water Aerodrome
- Port Alice/Rumble Beach Water Aerodrome
- Port Simpson Water Aerodrome
- Port Washington Water Aerodrome
- Prince George (North Cariboo Air Park) Airport
- Quilchena Airport
- Rykerts Water Aerodrome
- Scar Creek Airport
- Scum Lake Airport
- Sechelt/Porpoise Bay Water Aerodrome
- Shuswap (Skwlax Field) Aerodrome
- Surrey/King George Airpark
- Takla Narrows Aerodrome
- Tasu Water Aerodrome
- Telegraph Creek Airport
- Tipella Airport
- RCAF Station Tofino
- Tsacha Lake Airport
- Vanderhoof (District) Water Aerodrome
- Williams Lake Water Aerodrome

== Manitoba ==
List of airports in Manitoba

- Arnes Airport
- Beausejour/AV-Ranch Airpark
- Canadian Forces Base Portage la Prairie
- Gilbert Plains Airport
- Gods Lake Narrows Water Aerodrome
- Hartney Airport
- Matheson Island Airport
- RCAF Station Paulson
- Pine Dock Airport
- Pukatawagen Water Aerodrome
- Shilo Heliport (CFB Shilo)
- Shilo (Flewin Field) Heliport (CFB Shilo)
- Ste. Rose du Lac Airport
- The Pas/Grace Lake Water Aerodrome
- Virden (West) Airport
- Wabowden Water Aerodrome
- Woodlands Airport

== New Brunswick ==
List of airports in New Brunswick

- RCAF Station Moncton
- RCAF Station Pennfield Ridge
- RCAF Station Saint John
- Saint-Quentin Aerodrome
- RCAF Aerodrome - Scoudouc

== Newfoundland and Labrador ==
List of airports in Newfoundland and Labrador

- Naval Station Argentia
- Bay d'Espoir Aerodrome
- Bonavista Aerodrome
- Border Beacon
- RCAF Station Botwood
- Buchans Airport
- Davis Inlet Aerodrome
- Ernest Harmon Air Force Base
- Hope Brook Aerodrome
- McAndrew Air Force Base
- Menihek Aerodrome
- Michelin Falls Aerodrome
- Paradise River Airport
- Pepperrell Air Force Base
- Ross Bay Junction Airport
- Saglek Airport (CFS Saglek)
- Twin Falls Aerodrome
- Williams Harbour Airport

== Northwest Territories ==
List of airports in the Northwest Territories

- Arctic Red River Water Aerodrome
- Colomac Airport
- Fitzgerald (Fort Smith) Water Aerodrome
- Fort McPherson Water Aerodrome
- Fort Providence Water Aerodrome
- Hay River/Brabant Lodge Water Aerodrome
- Mould Bay Airport
- Nahanni Butte Water Aerodrome
- Snap Lake Airport
- Thor Lake Aerodrome

== Nova Scotia ==
List of airports in Nova Scotia

- Amherst Airport
- Apple River Airport
- Fancy Lake Water Aerodrome
- Langille Lake Water Aerodrome
- Margaree Airport
- Middle Stewiacke Airport
- Halifax Civic Airport
- Tatamagouche Airport
- Valley Airport
- Waterville/Kings County Municipal Airport
- Waverley/Lake William Water Aerodrome

== Nunavut ==
List of airports in Nunavut

- Doris Lake Aerodrome
- Frobisher Bay Air Base
- Lupin Airport
- Nanisivik Airport

== Ontario ==
List of airports in Ontario

- RCAF Detachment Alliston
- Armour Heights Field
- Armstrong/Waweig Lake Water Aerodrome
- Arnstein Airport
- Arthur (Arthur South) Aerodrome
- Arthur (Metz Field) Aerodrome
- Atwood Airport
- Barker Field
- Barrie/Little Lake Water Aerodrome
- Batchawana Water Aerodrome
- Beaverton Aerodrome
- Beaverton North Aerodrome
- Belwood (Ellen Field) Aerodrome
- Belwood (Wright Field) Aerodrome
- Buttonville Municipal Airport
  (Toronto/Buttonville Municipal Airport)
- Caledonia/Grand River Water Aerodrome
- Canton Aerodrome
- Chapleau Water Airport
- Curries (Rand Private Airfield) Aerodrome
- Cushing Lake Water Aerodrome
- Deer Lake/Keyamawun Water Aerodrome
- Deer Lake Water Aerodrome
- De Lesseps Field
- Dorset/Kawagama Lake (Old Mill Marina) Water Aerodrome
- Downsview Airport (Toronto/Downsview Airport, Downsview Airfield)
- RCAF Station Dunnville
- Dunnville Airport
- Durham (Mulock) Airport
- Dutton Aerodrome
- Eagle River Airport
- Ear Falls Airport
- Elk Lake Airport
- Elmira (East) Airport
- Fergus (Royland Field) Aerodrome
- Five Mile Lake Water Aerodrome
- Fort Erie Airport
- RCAF Detachment Gananoque
- Gananoque Water Aerodrome
- Geraldton/Hutchison Lake Water Aerodrome
- Gowganda/Gowganda Lake Water Aerodrome
- RCAF Detachment Grand Bend
- Grand Valley (Madill Field) Aerodrome
- Haliburton Water Aerodrome
- RCAF Station Hamilton
- Hawkesbury (Windover Field) Airport
- Highgate (South) Aerodrome
- Huntsville/Deerhurst Resort Airport
- Killaloe/Bonnechere Airport
- Kincardine (Ellis Field) Airport
- King City Airport
- Kingston Airfield
- Kingston Water Aerodrome
- Lac La Croix Water Aerodrome
- Lake Rosseau/Cameron Bay Water Aerodrome
- Lake Rosseau/Morgan Bay Water Aerodrome
- Lake Rosseau/Windermere Water Aerodrome
- Leaside Aerodrome (RCAF Station Leaside)
- Lefroy Airport
- Listowel Airport
- Little Current Water Aerodrome
- Long Branch Aerodrome
- Lucknow Airpark
- Mac Tier/Francis Island Water Aerodrome
- Madawaska Collins Field Aerodrome
- Maple Airport
- Moosonee Water Aerodrome
- Murillo/Hane Field Aerodrome
- Nakina/Lower Twin Lake Water Aerodrome
- New Liskeard Airport
- New Lowell Airport
- Niagara Falls/Niagara South Airport
- Nobel/Lumsden Air Park
- Nobleton Airport
- Norwood Airport
- Orangeville/Brundle Field Aerodrome
- Orangeville/Rosehill Aerodrome
- Orton/Smith Field Airport
- RCAF Station Oshawa
- Ottawa/Manotick (Hope Field) Aerodrome
- Palmerston Airport
- Parry Sound/Derbyshire Island Water Aerodrome
- Pays Plat Water Aerodrome
- Perry Lake Water Aerodrome
- Picton Airport
- Pikangikum Water Aerodrome
- RCAF Station Port Albert
- Port Elgin (Pryde Field) Airport
- Queensville (Rollick Airpark) Aerodrome
- Ridgetown (Carnie Airfield) Aerodrome
- Rodney (New Glasgow) Airport
- Selkirk/Kindy Airstrip
- Sioux Narrows Airport
- St. Joseph Island Airport
- Stewart Lake Water Aerodrome
- Stoney Point (Trepanier) Aerodrome
- Straffordville Airport
- Terrace Bay Airport
- Thamesford (Harydale Farms) Aerodrome
- Thessalon Municipal Airport
- Timmins/Porcupine Lake Water Aerodrome
- Toronto Aerodrome
- Victor Mine Aerodrome
- Washago Aerodrome
- Willowdale Airfield
- Winchester Airport
- List of airports in Ontario#Windermere Airport
- Winisk Airport
- Wyevale (Boker Field) Airport

== Prince Edward Island ==
List of airports in Prince Edward Island

- Grand River Airport
- RCAF Station Charlottetown
- RCAF Station Mount Pleasant
- CFB Summerside

== Quebec ==
List of airports in Quebec

- Aguanish Water Aerodrome
- Amos (Lac Figuery) Water Aerodrome
- Baie-Comeau Water Aerodrome
- Blue Sea Lake (Outaouais Aviation) Water Aerodrome
- Caniapiscau Aerodrome
- Cartierville Airport
- Chambly Airport
- Chibougamau/Lac Caché Water Aerodrome
- Chutes-des-Passes/Lac Margane Water Aerodrome
- Kegaska Airport
- L'Assomption Airport
- Lac à la Perchaude Airport
- Lac Beauregard Water Aerodrome
- Lac-des-Îles Water Aerodrome
- Lac Gagnon Water Aerodrome
- Lac Gobeil Water Aerodrome
- La Grande-4/Lac de la Falaise Water Aerodrome
- Lac Kaiagamac Water Aerodrome
- Lac Sept-Îles Water Aerodrome
- Lennoxville (Airview) Airport
- Maniwaki/Blue Sea Lake Water Aerodrome
- Mansonville Airport
- Matagami Water Aerodrome
- Matoush Aerodrome
- Montréal/Boucherville Water Aerodrome
- Montréal/Hydro Aéroport de Montréal Water Airport
- Montréal/Île Sainte-Hélène Water Airport
- Montréal/Les Cèdres Airport
- Montréal/Marina Venise Water Airport
- Montréal/Mascouche Airport
- Mont-Tremblant/Lac Duhamel Water Aerodrome
- Mont-Tremblant/Lac Ouimet Water Aerodrome
- Opinaca Aerodrome
- Ottawa/Gatineau Water Aerodrome
- Parc de la Vérendrye (Le Domaine) Water Aerodrome
- Parent Water Aerodrome
- Pontiac Airpark
- Pontiac Airpark Water Aerodrome
- Richelieu Airport
- Richelieu/Messier Aerodrome
- Rivière Saint-Maurice (Aviation Maurice) Water Aerodrome
- Rivière Témiscamie (Air Roberval Ltée) Aerodrome
- Rivière Témiscamie Water Aerodrome
- Roberval (Air Saguenay) Water Aerodrome
- Saint-Anselme Aerodrome
- Sainte-Agnès-de-Dundee Aerodrome
- Sainte-Julienne Aerodrome
- Sainte-Lucie-de-Beauregard Aerodrome
- CFB St. Hubert
- Saint-Jérôme Aerodrome
- Aérodrome Saint-Louis
- Saint-Michel-de-Napierville Aerodrome
- Senneterre Airport
- Stanhope Airport
- Témiscaming/Lac Kipawa Water Aerodrome
- Victoria STOLport

== Saskatchewan ==
List of airports in Saskatchewan

- Axe Lake Aerodrome
- Beechy Airport
- Buttress, Saskatchewan
- Canora Airport
- RCAF Station Caron
- Churchbridge Airport
- Cluff Lake Airport
- Cudworth Airport
- Cut Knife Airport
- RCAF Station Dafoe
- RCAF Station Davidson
- Davin Lake Airport
- Dore Lake Airport
- Eastend Airport
- RCAF Station Estevan
- Estevan/Bryant Airport
- Estevan (South) Airport
- Ferland Airport
- Gainsborough Airport
- Hague/Guliker Field Aerodrome
- Hanley Airport
- Hidden Bay Airport
- Imperial Airport
- La Loche Water Aerodrome
- Leoville Airport
- Lewvan (Farr Air) Airport
- Lumsden (Metz) Airport
- Melville Municipal Airport
- RCAF Station Mossbank
- Naicam Airport
- Nipawin Water Aerodrome
- North Battleford/Hamlin Airport
- Otter Lake Airport
- Outlook Airport
- Paradise Hill Airport
- Radisson Airport
- Redvers Airport
- Rocanville Airport
- Spiritwood Airport
- Squaw Rapids Airport
- Wawota Airport
- West Poplar Airport
- RCAF Station Weyburn
- White City (Radomsky) Airport
- Wilkie Airport
- Willow Bunch Airport

== Yukon ==
List of airports in Yukon

- Dawson City Water Aerodrome
- Faro/Johnson Lake Water Aerodrome
- Haines Junction/Pine Lake Water Aerodrome
- Teslin Water Aerodrome

== See also ==
- List of airports in Canada
- List of heliports in Canada
