= List of airports in the Greater Toronto Area =

Location in Ontario

As of May 2024, the Greater Toronto Area (GTA) contains seven airports, eight heliports, and one water aerodrome. These aviation facilities are situated within and around Toronto and its neighbouring cities, serving airline passengers, regional air travel and commercial cargo transportation. Toronto Pearson International Airport, located mainly in Mississauga, is the busiest airport in Canada and hosts international travel with various airlines. Billy Bishop Toronto City Airport on the Toronto Islands is a regional airport, providing regular services to United States destinations. Pearson, Bishop, and John C. Munro Hamilton International Airport in Hamilton combined served over 53 million passengers in 2018, making Toronto the world's 31st busiest city airport system in the world.

Heliports and water aerodromes are mostly for private use only, mainly by institutions and medical services.

Current aerodromes in Toronto

== Airports ==
=== Scheduled commercial airline service ===
Airport name	ICAO/TC LID/IATA	Location	Coordinates	Image
Billy Bishop Toronto City Airport	CYTZ (YTZ)	Toronto (Toronto Islands)	43°37′39″N 079°23′46″W	
Toronto Pearson International Airport	CYYZ (YYZ)	Mississauga	43°40′38″N 079°37′50″W	

=== Other ===
Airport name	ICAO/TC LID/IATA	Location	Coordinates	Image
Brampton-Caledon Airport	CNC3	Caledon	43°45′37″N 079°52′30″W	
Burlington Executive Airport	CZBA	Burlington	43°26′30″N 079°51′01″W	
Markham Airport	CNU8	Markham	43°56′09″N 079°15′44″W	
Oshawa Executive Airport	CYOO (YOO)	Oshawa	43°55′22″N 078°53′42″W	

=== Water aerodromes ===
Airport name	ICAO/TC LID/IATA	Location	Coordinates	Image
Billy Bishop Toronto City Water Aerodrome	CPZ9	Toronto Islands, Toronto	43°37′59″N 079°23′40″W	

=== Heliports ===
Airport name	ICAO/TC LID/IATA	Location	Coordinates	Image
Brampton (National "D") Heliport	CPC4	Bolton, Brampton	43°50′00″N 079°42′03″W	
King City/Kingbridge Heliport	CKC3	Kingbridge Centre, King City	43°55′02″N 79°33′37″W	
Chartright Polson Pier Heliport	CPP4	Toronto	N43 38 30 W79 21 22	
Toronto (Hospital For Sick Children) Heliport	CNW8	Toronto	43°39′00″N 079°23′00″W	
Toronto/Markham Stouffville Heliport	CPH7	Cornell, Markham	43°53′00″N 079°14′00″W	
Toronto (Mississauga Credit Valley Hospital) Heliport	CPK6	Central Erin Mills, Mississauga	43°33′41″N 079°42′09″W	
Toronto (St. Michael's Hospital) Heliport	CTM4	Garden District, Toronto	43°39′15″N 079°22′42″W	
Toronto (Sunnybrook Medical Centre) Heliport	CNY8	Toronto	43°43′16″N 079°22′14″W	
Tarten Heliport	CPA5	Mississauga	43°39′07″N 079°39′29″W	
Wilson's Heliport	CPY5	Toronto (Etobicoke)	43°37′04″N 079°33′49″W	

== Other airports ==
=== Cancelled proposed airport ===
There was a proposal to develop a new Pickering Airport northeast of the city, to complement Pearson. Versions of these tentative plans had been in existence since the early 1970s, and land for this proposed airport was expropriated by government authorities in 1972. However, continued and vociferous local opposition to the Pickering airport scheme have meant that forty years later, the airport had not moved beyond the discussion phase. In June 2013, the federal government announced the revival of the airport, but development was not expected to take place until 2027 to 2037. However, in January 2025 the Federal Government officially cancelled all plans for the Pickering Airport.

=== Historical airports ===
Historic airports code:
- AHF – Armour Heights Field
- BF – Baker Field
- CYKZ – Buttonville Municipal Airport
- DLF – De Lesseps Field
- CYZD – Downsview Airport
- DA – Downsview Airfield
- LA – Leaside Aerodrome
- LBA – Long Branch Aerodrome
- MA – Maple Aerodrome
- TA – Toronto Aerodrome
- WA – Willowdale Airfield
- King City Airport is not included

The following airports once served the area but have since been closed:

Airport name	Location	Coordinates	Current use	Image
Armour Heights Field	Armour Heights, Toronto	43°44′27″N 079°25′20″W	Closed 1921 and re-developed as residential neighbourhood	
Barker Field	Yorkdale	43°42′54″N 079°27′22″W	Closed 1953 and now commercial property (Shell Canada gas station, Downsview Toyota dealership, Burger King, etc.)	
Buttonville Municipal Airport	Buttonville, Markham	43°51′44″N 079°22′12″W	Closed on 30 November 2023, will be re-developed by Cadillac Fairview. Plans include condominiums, retail shops, and office space.	
De Lesseps Field	Mount Dennis Weston	43°41′54.6″N 079°29′47.15″W	Opened in 1910 as Trethewey Airfield at a canning shed; home to de Havilland Canada in 1928 until it moved to Downsview in 1929. Site now re-developed into residential neighbourhood.	
Downsview Airfield	Downsview	43°44′37″N 079°27′59″W	Ceased as military airfield 1996 CFB Toronto and Downsview Airport is former manufacturing facility for Bombardier Aviation (closed 2022)	
Downsview Airport	Downsview	43°44′34″N 079°27′56″W	Closed March 2024	
King City Airport	King City	43°54′21″N 079°33′35″W	Bought by construction company for commercial use. Buildings were demolished in 2021.	
Leaside Aerodrome	East York	43°42′46″N 079°21′33″W	Closed 1939 and later developed as commercial and industrial business park	
Long Branch Aerodrome	Long Branch	43°34′26″N 079°33′16″W	Closed 1919 and home to Lakeview Generating Station 1962–2007. Station demolished and being developed for homes, cultural and community use, as well as parkland along the waterfront.	
Maple Airport	Vaughan	43°50′36″N 079°31′37″W	Closed 1987 and re-developed as residential neighbourhood	
Toronto Aerodrome (Toronto Flying Club)	Toronto (Sheppard West station)	43°44′56″N 079°27′39″W	Closed after 1939 and later became the Sheppard West subway station	
Willowdale Airfield	Willowdale	43°46′11″N 079°25′36″W	Closed before 1940 and now York Cemetery, Toronto	

== See also ==
- Greater Toronto Area#Transportation
- List of cities with more than one commercial airport
- List of airports in the Ottawa area
