= Mossbank =

Mossbank may refer to:

- Mossbank, Shetland, Scotland
- Mossbank, Saskatchewan, Canada
- RCAF Station Mossbank, Canada
