= Montreal Light Airplane Club =

The Montreal Light Airplane Club was one of the first airplane clubs founded in Canada in 1928 under a Canadian Government scheme to promote the development of the light airplane movement in Canada. it was established at Cartierville Airport, Montreal, Quebec, but expanded quickly and was moved to St. Hubert, Quebec.

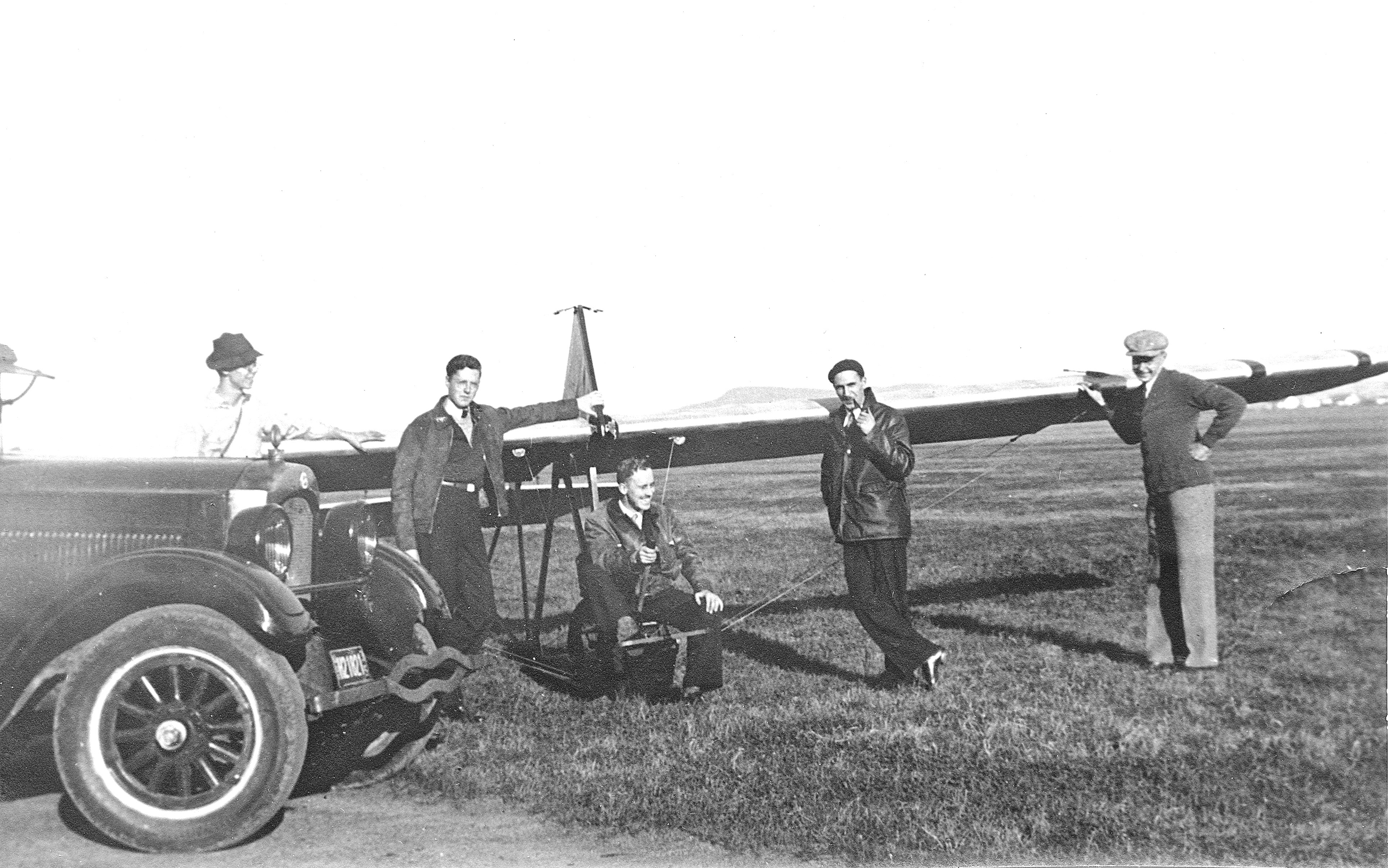
Glider at St. Hubert. ca. 1937

== History ==
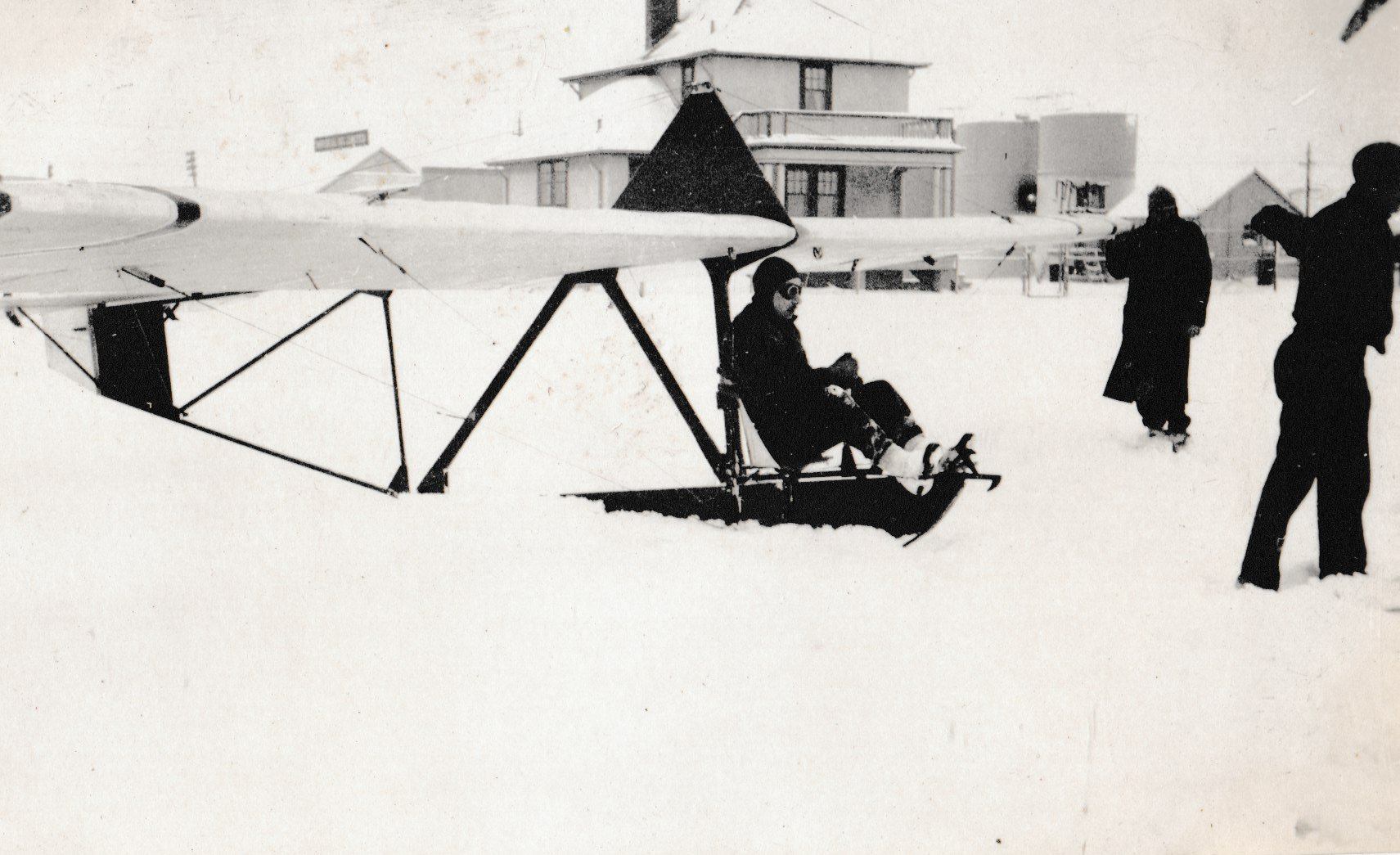
St. Hubert, c. 1937

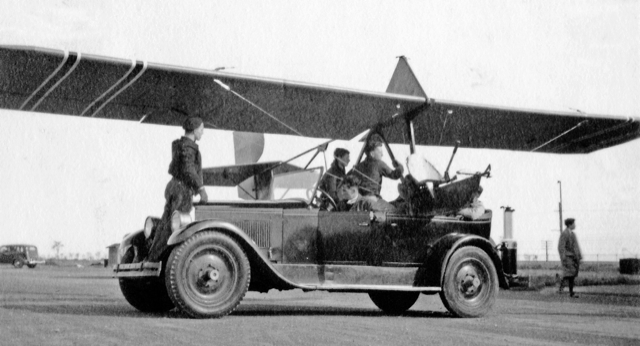
Glider at St. Hubert, c. 1937

The club took delivery of its first plane, a De Havilland "Moth" Mk. II Cirrus on May 12, 1928. By October, 1928 the club had four De Havilland Moths, 161 flying members and 58 "associate members" who were allowed to take flights.

The club had the use of the aerodrome at St. Hubert, Quebec which, at the time, was projected to be Canada's main airport. It is now the site of Air Richelieu - Montreal Flying Club - Aeroclub Montreal.
