= Wilfrid Thomas Reid =

English aircraft designer (1887–1968)

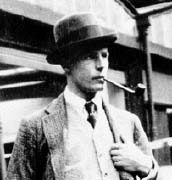
- Wilfrid T. Reid, c.1920
- Born: 4 March 1887; Battersea, Surrey, England
- Died: 5 April 1968 (aged 81); Newton Abbot, Devon, England
- Occupations: Aeronautical engineer, designer Entrepreneur
- Children: Two

Wilfrid Thomas Reid (4 March 1887 – 5 April 1968) was an English aircraft designer and considered one of the pioneers of the Canadian aircraft industry.

Reid was born on 4 March 1887 in Battersea, Surrey. He died in Newton Abbot, Devon, on 5 April 1968 of heart failure. He was married with two children.

== Aviation career ==
=== United Kingdom ===
Reid was educated at Bedford Modern School between 1896 and 1903. After school he up an apprenticeship from 1 June 1903 to 1 June 1908 at the Queen's Engineering Works of W. H. Allen, Son & Co. Ltd located in Queens Park, Bedford, England. His father, James Reid, was a manager at the Works. Reid then worked as a marine engineer with the Fairfield Shipyards on the River Clyde in Glasgow, Scotland. In the course of his work at the company, he travelled across the Atlantic several times.

During the initial stages of the First World War, Reid worked at the Royal Aircraft Factory. In 1916, Reid started working for the Bristol Aeroplane Company (then known as the British and Colonial Aeroplane Company) assisting Frank Barnwell, working on aircraft such as the Bristol M.R.1, the Braemar bomber, M.1D and Bristol Ten-seater, .

In October 1921, Barnwell left the company to emigrate to Australia and Reid took over the role as chief designer, designing the Bristol Racer, Bloodhound and Berkeley. Barnwell subsequently returned in 1923 and displaced Reid as chief designer. This caused Reid to leave the company.

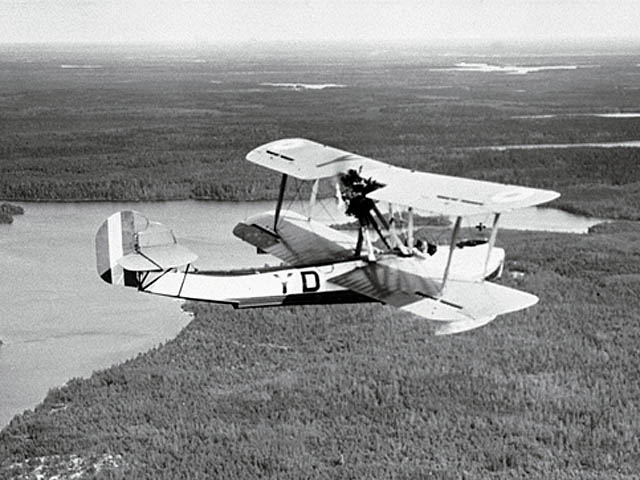
Vickers Vedette

=== Canada ===
==== Canadian Vickers Limited ====
In 1924, Canadian Vickers Limited hired Reid to be their chief aircraft designer. The company was located in Montreal, Quebec, Canada. Reid was given the plans for an aircraft started by R. K. Pierson who worked for Vickers Limited, the British parent company of Canadian Vickers Limited.

Reid, together with a man named Newall, developed the design into the aircraft known as the Vedette. "The design and production of the Canadian Vickers Vedette marked the true beginning of the Canadian aircraft industry."

==== Reid Aircraft Company ====
Reid founded the Reid Aircraft Company in February 1928. The company was based at what was to become known as the Cartierville Airport. The objective of the company was to design and produce a light training aircraft initially called the Reid Rambler. But subsequently became known as the Curtiss-Reid Rambler

==== Curtiss-Reid Aircraft Company ====
In December 1928, the Curtiss Aeroplane and Motor Company bought the Reid Aircraft Company. The company was renamed to the Curtiss-Reid Aircraft Company. Curtiss-Reid went bankrupt in 1931 and was sold to a new company called Montreal Aircraft Industries. Reid was not part of the new company.

==== Crude Oil Engine and Engineering Co. ====
Several years after he sold Reid Aircraft, he bought a diesel engine sales agency, the Crude Oil Engine Co. (which he renamed the Crude Oil Engine and Engineering Co.). It supplied engines for marine use and other purposes.

== Honours ==
- Inducted into The Québec Air and Space Hall of Fame on 6 April 2006.
- Elected Associate Fellow of the Royal Aeronautical Society on 19 April 1917, then to the rank of Fellow (FRAeS) on 10 November 1925.
- Associate Member of the Institution of Mechanical Engineers.
- In 1994, the Royal Canadian Mint issued a $20 coin honouring Wilfrid Reid and the Vickers Vedette.

== See also ==
- List of aerospace engineers
