= Henry Robson =

Henry Robson may refer to:

- Henry Robson (songwriter) (1775–1850), Tyneside concert hall songwriter and performer
- Henry Howey Robson (1894–1964), English recipient of the Victoria Cross
