= Burlington Executive Airport =

Private airstrip in Ontario, Canada

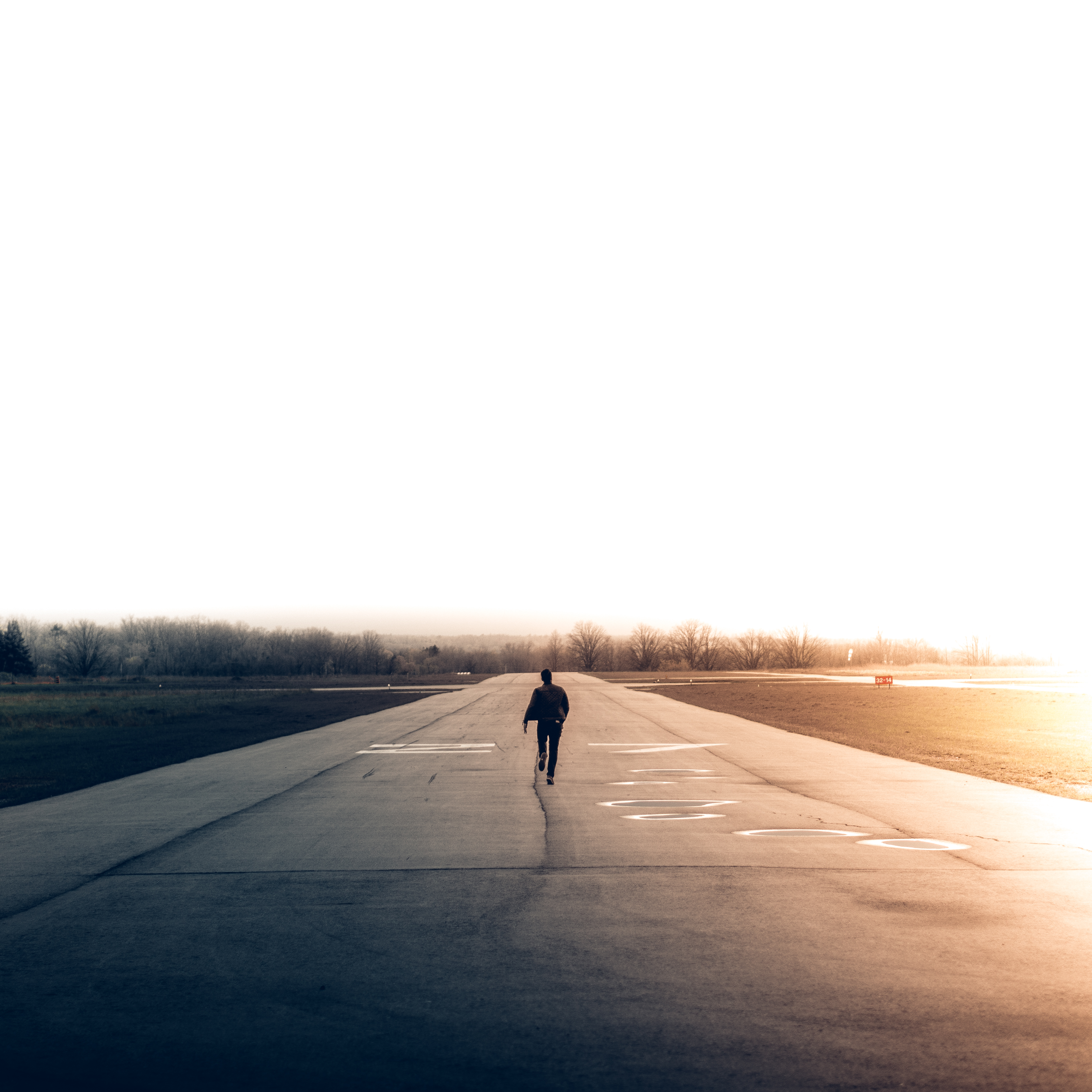
- IATA: none; ICAO: CZBA

Summary
- Airport type: Public
- Operator: Vince Rossi
- Location: Burlington, Ontario
- Time zone: EST (UTC−05:00)
  - Summer (DST): EDT (UTC−04:00)
- Elevation AMSL: 601 ft (183 m)
- Coordinates: 43°26′29″N 079°51′01″W
- Website: www.burlingtonairpark.com

Map
- Location in Ontario CZBA (Canada)

Runways
| Direction | Length | | Surface |
| Direction | ft | m | Surface |
|---|---|---|---|
| 14/32 | 3,950 | 1,204 | Asphalt |
| 09/27 | 2,464 | 751 | Asphalt |
- Source: Canada Flight Supplement

Burlington Executive Airport (ICAO: CZBA) is a small, privately operated general aviation registered aerodrome in rural Burlington, Ontario, Canada, west of Toronto. The closure of Buttonville Municipal Airport is expected to lead to an increase in traffic.

== History ==
The airport was founded by Victor and Gwen Kovachik in 1962. It was purchased by Vince Rossi in 2006.

== Technical information ==
- Magnetic variation: 10° west
- Communications: Unicom/ATF: Burlington Unicom/Traffic, 123.5 MHz
- Burlington's main runway - 14/32 - which is 3,950 ft × 100 ft (1,204 m × 30 m)
- Right-hand circuits runway 32, 27

== Services ==
A January 2019 report provided the following specifics about the services provided:

- 143 privately owned aircraft hangars with outside tie-down available
- charter operations
- corporate aircraft
- aircraft maintenance
- fuel services
- flight training facilities

== Controversy ==
Residents neighbouring the airport property have raised a number of concerns about substantial amounts of fill being moved onto the site. Airport officials have indicated that the work they are raising and leveling a large portion of the site for expansion of the airport.

The City of Burlington has taken the position that the city's site alteration bylaw is applicable and must be complied with. As a result, the City of Burlington issued an Order to Comply related to the city's Site Alteration Bylaw 6-2003 on 3 May 2013.

In May 2014, the Burlington Airpark filed a $100,000 claim for libel against Pepper Parr, Vanessa Warren, and Monte Dennis, seeking damages for comments made in relation to the Airpark's fill operation. Parr is the president of the online newspaper the Burlington Gazette. Warren is the former Chair of the Rural Burlington Greenbelt Coalition (RBGC) and was a candidate for Municipal and Regional Council in 2014. Dennis is the current Co-Chair of the RBGC, and a member of Citizens Opposed to Paving the Escarpment (COPE) and Coalition on the Niagara Escarpment (CONE) Warren and Dennis have characterized this claim as a SLAPP - strategic lawsuit against public participation.

In September 2014 Burlington City Council approved an update to its Site Alteration By-Law. By-Law 64-2014 replaced the earlier By-Law 6-2003 which was established to protect and conserve topsoil and for prohibiting the alteration of property within the City of Burlington. According to the staff report E-10-14, the updated by-law would provide the City with better regulatory abilities, particularly for large scale site alteration operations. There were also changes to the fee structure to provide more appropriate cost recoveries for the administrative and inspection duties of staff.

In April 2015 Burlington City Council gave staff authority to take Burlington Airpark Inc. back to court over failure to comply with the municipal bylaw. On 21 May 2015, the Ontario Court of Justice heard a motion from Burlington Airpark Inc. to remove paragraphs from a City of Burlington affidavit supporting the city's application. Burlington Airpark Inc. argued these paragraphs contain an improper reference to "without prejudice" discussions between the city and the Airpark. The Ontario Court of Justice granted the motion to remove the paragraphs from the affidavit and awarded Burlington Airpark Inc. $3,500 in costs to be paid by the city. The court date to hear the city's application regarding Burlington Airpark Inc. was rescheduled from 28 May 2015, to 10 November 2015, before a judge of the Ontario Superior Court of Justice.

In October 2015, the Ontario government passed Bill 52, the Protection of Public Participation Act 2015, which aims to allow the public to participate more freely in public discussions without fear of retribution by giving them a better way to defend themselves against strategic lawsuits. The act is not retroactive to claims filed prior to it going into effect.

In December 2015 Rural Burlington Greenbelt Coalition launched a crowdfunding campaign to help Warren and Dennis pay their legal costs with a goal of $100,000. As of October 2016 the campaign had raised just over $8000.

On 30 June 2016, the Ontario Superior Court of Justice ruled in favour of the City of Burlington's application to compel Burlington Airpark Inc. to submit an application for a site alteration permit to comply with site alteration bylaw 64-2014. With the court ruling, Burlington Airpark Inc is now required to file an application for a site alteration permit for the fill deposited between 2008-2013. The owners of the airpark filed an appeal almost immediately disputing the applicability of the bylaw; a court date to hear the latest appeal has been set for 28 March 2017 at Osgoode Hall in Toronto.

On 8 November 2016 the City of Burlington announced that the Ontario Superior Court of Justice ordered Burlington Airpark Inc. to pay City of Burlington court costs in the amount of $118,327.53.

On 24 May 2017 it was reported that the airpark had won the right to appeal the previous ruling. In a written decision, Justice Robert J. Sharpe said he recognized the importance of enforcing standards designed to protect the public from environmental harm, but noted the task in the appeal was limited to determining if the city's 2014 bylaw applied. Justice Sharpe stated he saw no language in the city's 2014 bylaw to suggest it was meant to operate retroactively. In a press release the City of Burlington indicated it was disappointed with the Court's decision and that it would continue to use its regulatory authority to require a site alteration permit for any new fill proposed to be deposited at the airpark site.

== See also ==
- List of airports in the Greater Toronto Area
