= Brampton-Caledon Airport =

- IATA: none; ICAO: none; TC LID: CNC3

Summary
- Airport type: Public
- Operator: Brampton Flying
- Location: Caledon, Ontario
- Time zone: EST (UTC−05:00)
  - Summer (DST): EDT (UTC−04:00)
- Elevation AMSL: 936 ft / 285 m
- Coordinates: 43°45′35″N 079°52′26″W
- Website: www.bramptonflightcentre.com

Map
- Location in Ontario

Runways
Direction	Length		Surface
Direction	ft	m	Surface
15/33	3,500	1,067	Asphalt / grass
08/26	2,500	762	Asphalt / grass
- Source: Canada Flight Supplement

Brampton-Caledon Airport (TC LID: CNC3) is a privately owned general aviation airport in Caledon, near Brampton, Ontario, Canada, northwest of Toronto. The airport is listed as an airport of entry by Nav Canada and is staffed by the Canada Border Services Agency (CBSA). CBSA officers at this airport can handle general aviation aircraft only, with no more than 15 passengers.

The club and airport was established in 1946 and occupies 240 acres (0.97 km^{2}) of land. The airport consists of two paved runways, a flight school building, terminal building, aircraft service and maintenance facilities and 25 storage hangars. It is the busiest uncontrolled airport in Canada by number of flights.

== History ==
The Brampton Flying Club first opened the airfield in 1946 on farmland and replaced a series of earlier landing strips near Highway 7 (Stan Archdekin Strip, Fallis Strip, Rankin Kellum Strip, First Line West and Ontario Department of Agriculture Field) built around 1945.

== Tenants ==
- Brampton Flying Club - also owners of airport
- Great War Flying Museum
- Brampton Airport Flight Training School
- Brampton Flight College
- Humphrey's Pilot Shop
- BFC Restaurant-Cafe
- 892 (Snowy Owl) Squadron - Royal Canadian Air Cadets

== See also ==
- List of airports in the Greater Toronto Area
