= Cuthbert Hoare =

British Army general (1883–1969)

Cuthbert Gurney Hoare
- Born: 21 January 1883
- Died: 31 January 1969 (aged 86)
- Relatives: Major-General Francis Hoare (brother)
- Military career
- Allegiance: United Kingdom
- Branch: British Army; Indian Army; Royal Air Force
- Service years: 1901–1923
- Rank: Brigadier-General
- Units: Worcestershire Regiment; Indian Staff Corps; 39th Prince of Wales's Own Central India Horse
- Commands: No. 7 Squadron RFC; No. 14 (Army) Wing RFC; Royal Flying Corps Canada
- Conflicts: World War I
- Awards: Order of St Michael and St George; Order of the British Empire

Brigadier-General Cuthbert Gurney Hoare CBE, CMG (21 January 1883 – 31 January 1969) was an officer of the British and Indian Army, who served in the Royal Flying Corps during World War I, and as the commander of Royal Flying Corps Canada.

== Early life and background ==
Hoare was the youngest of five sons of Charles Richard Gurney Hoare JP, and Rachel Georgina Bevan, of Biggleswade, Bedfordshire, and was educated at Harrow School and Trinity College, Cambridge.

== Military career ==
Hoare entered the Royal Military College, Sandhurst, as a cadet, and after passing out was assigned to the Worcestershire Regiment with the rank of second lieutenant on 8 May 1901.

On 4 January 1902, Hoare was seconded for service with the Indian Staff Corps. He was transferred to the British Indian Army on 13 February 1903, to serve in the 39th Prince of Wales's Own Central India Horse, and on 8 May 1910 he was promoted to captain.

Hoare learned to fly, being awarded Royal Aero Club Aviators Certificate No. 126 on 29 August 1911, after flying a Bristol Boxkite at the Bristol Flying School on Salisbury Plain after four weeks instruction. In June 1913, Hoare was selected for training as an instructor for the newly created Indian Flying Corps, undertaking a course at the Central Flying School at Upavon before being officially appointed a flying instructor at the Indian Central Flying School at Sitapur on 14 April 1914.

Following the outbreak of the war in Europe in August 1914, Hoare returned to England, where he was appointed a flight commander in the Royal Flying Corps on 12 September, being promoted to command of No. 7 Squadron as a squadron commander with the rank of temporary major on 24 March 1915.

No. 7 Squadron were sent to France on 8 April, equipped with two flights of R.E.5s and one flight of Vickers Fighters (which were soon replaced by Voisins), and soon found itself engaged in the Second Battle of Ypres. Its first operations were flown on 16 April 1915, with each aircraft carrying three 20-pound (9.1 kg) bombs. Tactical reconnaissance, artillery observation and bombing were its main duties, and on 12 May one aircraft made a particularly valuable reconnaissance, reporting a stream of enemy traffic moving through Valenciennes towards Douai and Lens, the first indication that the Germans were easing their pressure on Ypres and moving south for the battle of Festubert. No. 7 Squadron was then assigned to patrol the front lines between La Bassée and Lens, to provide cover for artillery observation aircraft during the battle of Loos. The squadron's awards list was opened on 15 July 1915 when Captain John Aidan Liddell won the Victoria Cross, bringing back his damaged aircraft despite being severely wounded. The squadron also had some success as a bomber unit, notably on a raid in September 1915 when Lieutenant M. G. Christie dropped two 112-pound (51 kg) bombs on the railway yard at Valenciennes from a height of 4,800 feet (1,500 m). His bombs hit two ammunition trains, both of which exploded, causing an immense amount of damage. Hoare finally handed over command of No. 7 Squadron to Major F. L. J. Cogan on 7 November 1915.

On 15 November 1915 Hoare was appointed Assistant Commandant of the Central Flying School at Upavon, with the temporary rank of lieutenant-colonel, serving there until 2 April 1916, when he was appointed a wing commander, to serve as Officer Commanding, No. 14 (Army) Wing, tasked with supporting Fourth Army during the battle of the Somme. On 13 November 1916 Hoare was one of a long list of officers mentioned in despatches by General Sir Douglas Haig, Commander-in-Chief of the British Armies in France.

In January 1917, Hoare was appointed Officer Commanding, Royal Flying Corps Canada, an organisation formed to recruit and train pilots and aircrew, with its main base at Camp Borden, near Barrie, Ontario. On 1 August, he was appointed brigade commander and became General Officer Commanding, with the temporary rank of brigadier-general. (His brother, Colonel Francis Hoare, served under him in charge of technical branch.) On 1 April 1918, the Army's Royal Flying Corps (RFC) and the Royal Naval Air Service (RNAS) were merged to form the Royal Air Force, and Hoare was commissioned into the RAF with the same rank. On 3 June 1918, Hoare was made a Companion of the Order of St Michael and St George (CMG) "in recognition of distinguished services rendered in connection with the war", and also received another mention in despatches. By the time of the armistice of 11 November 1918 Hoare's organisation had trained 3,135 pilots and 137 observers, of whom 2,539 pilots and 85 observers had been sent overseas.

On 24 April 1919, Hoare relinquished his Royal Air Force commission on ceasing to be employed, and reverted to his army rank of major in the Indian Army. On 3 June 1919, he was made a Commander of the Order of the British Empire (CBE) in the King's Birthday Honours. Major and Brevet Lieutenant-Colonel Hoare retired from the Indian Army on 21 January 1923 and was granted the honorary rank of brigadier-general.

== Bibliography ==
- Sullivan, Alan (1919). Aviation in Canada, 1917-1918: Being a brief account of the work of the Royal Air Force, Canada, the Aviation Department of the Imperial Munitions Board, and the Canadian Aeroplanes Limited. Toronto.
