= Curtiss-Reid Rambler =

Rambler
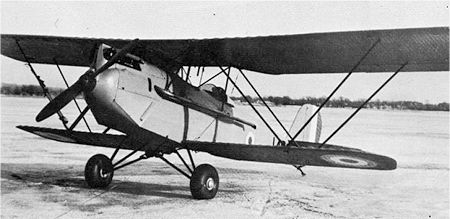

General information
- Type: Sportsplane
- Manufacturer: Reid, Curtiss-Reid
- Designer: Wilfrid T. Reid
- Primary user: Royal Canadian Air Force
- Number built: 45

History
- First flight: 22 September 1928

The Reid Rambler, later known under the Curtiss-Reid brand after Reid was purchased by Curtiss, was a biplane trainer/sport aircraft built in Canada in the early 1930s and used in small numbers as a trainer aircraft by the Royal Canadian Air Force.

== Design and development ==
In 1928, Wilfrid Thomas Reid set up his own company in Montreal after working as an engineer for Canadian Vickers. His first design was a light aircraft that was intended to exploit a Canadian government programme to support the development of flying clubs. The Reid Rambler was primarily intended to be a training aircraft. The Rambler was a largely conventional sesquiplane design with wings braced with Warren trusses and which could be folded backwards for transport or storage. The fuselage was of fabric-covered steel tube construction and the pilot and a single passenger sat in tandem, open cockpits.

The prototype (registration G-CAVO) was first flown at the Cartierville Airport on 23 September 1928 by Martin Berlyn. The test flight was nearly a disaster because the ailerons seized, leaving Berlyn with a dangerous approach and landing. A modification of the aileron control linkage rectified the problem. The Rambler continued to be developed, and in 1931, an improved version, the Rambler III, was flown with the more powerful Gipsy III engine. John C. Webster flew the MK III prototype in the British King's Cup Race that year.

== Operational history ==
In December 1928, the Curtiss Aeroplane & Motor Company purchased the Reid Aircraft Company and renamed it The Curtiss-Reid Aircraft Company. The new firm assumed control of the existing Rambler project and established a production line. A number of alterations were made to the production series including replacing the original ailerons with Frise-style ailerons, introducing an unbalanced rudder along with changes to the engine cowling, exhaust system and tailskid, and adding a head rest.

Although it was intended principally for civilian use, the Royal Canadian Air Force (RCAF) evaluated the aircraft as a basic training aircraft. Although the RCAF employed many other ab-initio aircraft including the ubiquitous de Havilland Moth, senior military staff elected to purchase a small number of the Ramblers.

Curtiss-Reid Ramblers enjoyed a relatively productive and lengthy career both in civilian and military use lasting well into the Second World War era.

== Variants ==
Data from:Canadian aircraft since 1909

Rambler Mk.I
Powered by an 83–100 hp (62–75 kW) de Havilland Gipsy I
Rambler Mk.II
Powered by a 105–115 hp (78–86 kW) Cirrus Hermes II
Rambler Mk.III
Powered by a 120 hp (89 kW) de Havilland Gipsy III

== Specifications (Rambler Mk.I) ==
Data from Jane's all the World's Aircraft 1931, Canadian aircraft since 1909

General characteristics

- Crew: 2
- Length: 22 ft 6 in (6.86 m) *Length folded: 22 ft 6 in (6.86 m)
- Upper wingspan: 33 ft (10 m)
- Lower wingspan: 22 ft 5 in (6.83 m)
- Width: 11 ft 1 in (3.38 m)
- Height: 8 ft (2.4 m)
- Wing area: 238 sq ft (22.1 m^{2})
- Empty weight: 1,000 lb (454 kg)
- Gross weight: 1,650 lb (748 kg)
- Fuel capacity: 20 imp gal (24 US gal; 91 L)
- Powerplant: 1 × de Havilland Gipsy I 4-cylinder up-right in-line air-cooled piston engine, 90 hp (67 kW)
- Propellers: 2-bladed fixed-pitch metal propeller

Performance

- Maximum speed: 102 mph (164 km/h, 89 kn) at sea level

97 mph (84 kn; 156 km/h) at 5,000 ft (1,500 m)

- Cruise speed: 90 mph (140 km/h, 78 kn)
- Stall speed: 38 mph (61 km/h, 33 kn)
- Range: 315 mi (507 km, 274 nmi) cruising range
- Endurance: 3.5 hours
- Service ceiling: 12,000 ft (3,700 m) ; 14,000 ft (4,300 m) Absolute ceiling
- Rate of climb: 750 ft/min (3.8 m/s)
- Wing loading: 6.075 lb/sq ft (29.66 kg/m^{2})
- Power/mass: 16.5 lb/hp (10.0 kg/kW)
