= Bristol Racer =

Type of aircraft

Racer
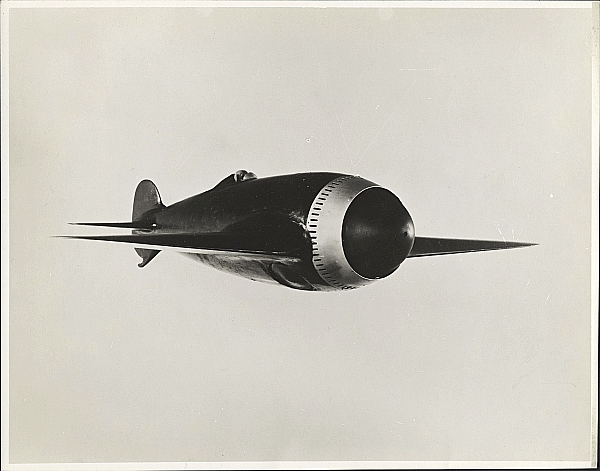
- Photo from Bristol Aircraft archive, showing a model of the Type 72 Racer.

General information
- Type: Single-seat racing monoplane
- National origin: United Kingdom
- Manufacturer: Bristol Aeroplane Company
- Designer: W. T. Reid
- Number built: 1

History
- First flight: 1922

The Bristol Type 72 Racer was a British racing monoplane designed by Wilfrid Thomas Reid and built by the Bristol Aeroplane Company at Filton, England.

== Background ==
The Bristol Racer was built to demonstrate the capabilities of the Bristol Jupiter engine designed by Roy Fedden. Frank Barnwell had resisted the idea of a special aircraft, maintaining that the Bristol Bullet was adequate for the purpose, but when Barnwell left the company in October 1921 Fedden and Wilfrid Reid, Barnwell's successor as chief designer, started to work on a monoplane design featuring a wholly enclosed engine. Detail design work was authorised on 5 December, and an order issued to the factory for a single aircraft on 23 January 1922.

== Design ==
The Bristol Racer was a single-engined mid-wing monoplane with, unusual for the time, a retractable undercarriage. The 480 hp (360 kW) Bristol Jupiter IV radial engine was entirely enclosed within the circular-section fuselage, with an elaborate arrangement of ducts to channel cooling air over the cylinders. A large spinner with a central opening to admit air, constructed of laminated wood with internal wire bracing was fitted. The fuselage, which increased in diameter until the trailing edge of the wing and then tapered to a point, was built around a pair of circular steel frames to which the wing root stubs were mounted: aft of this structure it was a semi-monocoque built up from three laminations of tulipwood over hoops which were braced with radial wires. The fabric-covered wings had composite steel-and-wood spars and were designed as cantilevers, without bracing wires, and were parallel-chord with raked tips and deep full-span ailerons, which accounted for about 20% of the wing's chord. The undercarriage was operated by a handcrank and chain drive, the legs being housed in channels in the fuselage and the wheels within the wing roots.

== Operational history ==
One aircraft was built in 1922 and registered G-EBDR on 27 June 1922. Piloted by Cyril Uwins, it made its maiden flight early in July 1922. This revealed control problems caused by twisting of the wing caused by the overlarge ailerons. For the second fight, bracing wires were added to the wing, but immediately after takeoff on a second flight the spinner disintegrated, the debris causing damage to the wing covering, and the flight was restricted to a single circuit. The first flight had taken place with the spinner unpainted: it had subsequently been painted, and the additional weight of the paint had caused the failure. A third flight, without any spinner, revealed that there was still a problem with the ailerons. An attempt to rectify this was made by fitting a device which produced a small control surface movement for small movements of the joystick, with the rate of control surface displacement progressively increasing as stick displacement was increased. This device, which used a cam on the bottom of the joystick to displace a pair of rollers connected to the ailerons, worked on the ground but under flight loads the rollers were pulled out of contact with the cam, resulting in loss of lateral control. Uwins made yet another wide circuit in the aircraft and again managed a safe landing. For the next flight the cam device was removed and the control issue addressed by reducing the area of the ailerons to around 40% of their original area. At the same time a new spinner was fitted, this being designed to remain static. Three further flights were made, during the last two of which the undercarriage was successfully operated. Although the aircraft had been entered for the 1922 Coupe Deutsch de la Meurthe competition, and was allocated the racing number 10 which was painted on the tail, it was not in a fit condition to compete, and although it was suggested that it be used as an engine testbed, its flight characteristics were entirely unsuitable for this role and it was eventually scrapped in 1924.

== Specifications ==
Data from

General characteristics

- Crew: one
- Length: 21 ft 7 in (6.58 m)
- Wingspan: 25 ft 2 in (7.67 m)
- Powerplant: 1 × Bristol Jupiter IV radial engine , 480 hp (358 kW)

Performance

- Maximum speed: 220 mph (353 km/h, 190 kn) (estimated)
