= Willowdale Airfield =

Former airfield in North York, Toronto

Coordinates: 43°46′11″N 079°25′36″W

- IATA: none; ICAO: CA-0489

Summary
- Location: North York, Toronto

Map
- Location within Toronto

Willowdale Airfield was located in North York, Toronto, Ontario, Canada near Finch Avenue and Senlac in the Willowdale neighbourhood. Like many of the small aerodromes in Toronto, it disappeared before World War II. The airfield was built on farmland once owned by local settler Joseph Shepard, who owned over 200 acres of land.

In 1948, the former airfield became part of what is now York Cemetery.

== See also ==
- List of abandoned airports in Canada
- List of airports in the Greater Toronto Area
