= Maple Airport =

Former airfield in Ontario, Canada

- IATA: none; ICAO: none

Summary
- Airport type: ~~Private~~
- Owner: ~~Dr. Philip Macfarlane~~; ~~Maple Flying Club~~; ~~Great Pine Ridge Developments~~; ~~Neiltown Air Limited~~
- Operator: ~~Maple Flying Club~~; ~~Great Pine Ridge Developments~~; ~~Neiltown Air Limited~~
- Location: Vaughan Township, Ontario, Canada
- Time zone: EST (UTC−05:00)
  - Summer (DST): EDT (UTC−04:00)
- Coordinates: 43°50′36″N 079°31′37″W

Map
- Location in Ontario

Runways
Direction	Length		Surface
Direction	ft	m	Surface
	~~3,700~~	~~1,100~~	~~Asphalt (originally grass)~~
	~~2,500~~	~~760~~	~~Asphalt (originally grass)~~

Maple Airport was a small airfield in the Township of Vaughan (now a city) in York Region, Ontario, Canada, near the namesake former Village of Maple, that was open from 1955 until 1987. The airport, established by Marion Alice Orr, one of Canada's first female pilots, consisted of two runways in an X pattern; 3,700 feet (1,100 m) and 2,500 feet (760 m). The runways were originally grass but were paved in 1980.

At one point, the Maple Airport was the third-busiest private commercial and civilian airport in Canada not to have a control tower.

The urbanization of Vaughan and the Maple area led to the closure of the airport in 1987.

Nothing remains of the airport today, which is now the site of a residential area and Le Petite Prince Catholic Elementary School. A small park in the neighbourhood, on Avro Road, was named Maple Airport Park in honour of the former airport. Many streets are named after aircraft makes and models such as Avro, Lockheed, and Mustang.

== Buildings ==
The early buildings of the airport were the farmhouse and barn from the original owners. Tie-down hangars were added, but no permanent airport structures were built.

== Tenants ==
- Maple Flying Club
- Gillies Flying Service
- Maple Air Services Ltd.
- Neiltown Air Limited
- Auberge Maple Inn - restaurant

== See also ==
- List of airports in the Greater Toronto Area
- List of abandoned airports in Canada
