= Cartierville Airport =

Former airport in Saint-Laurent, Quebec

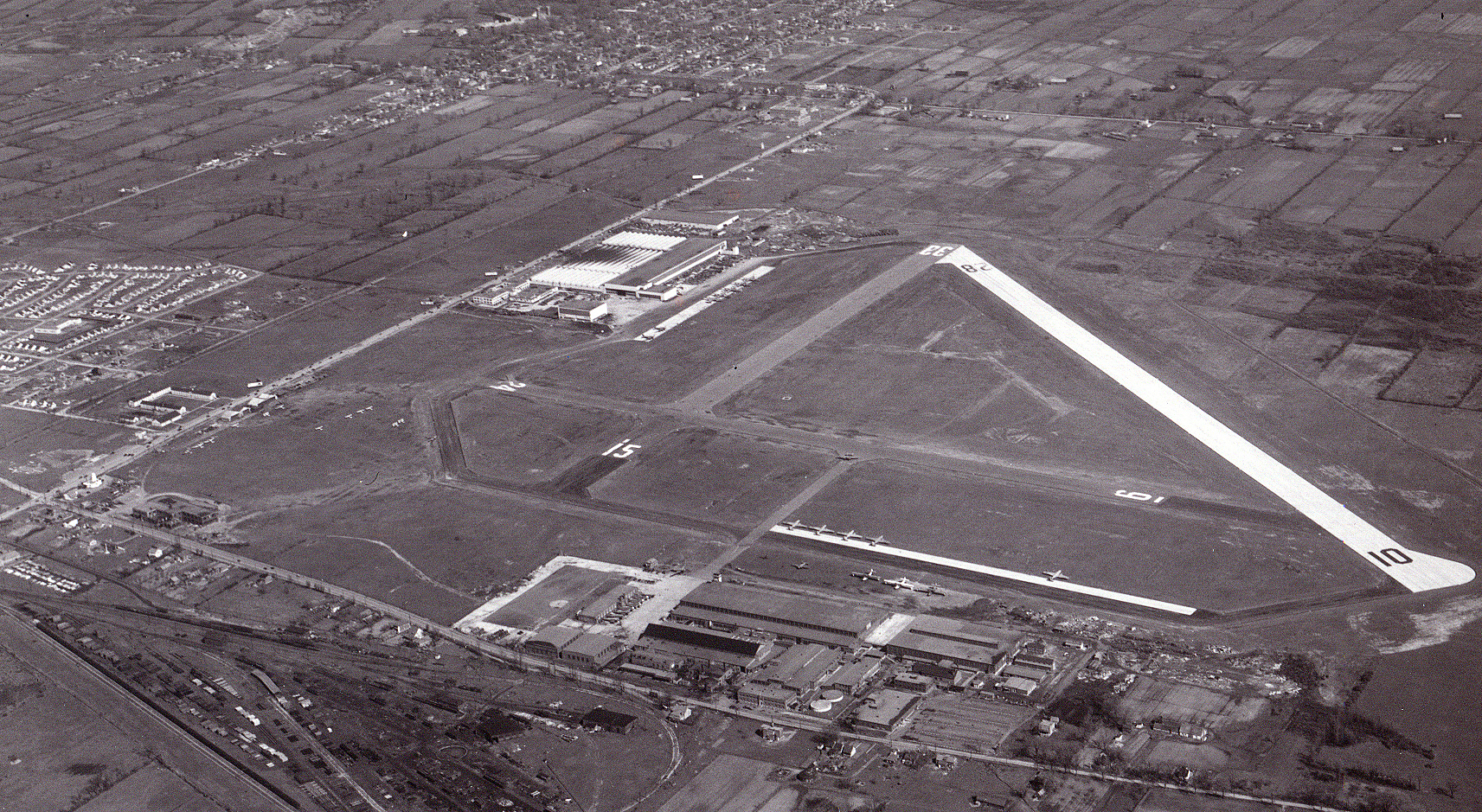
- IATA: ~~YCV~~; ICAO: ~~CYCV~~

Summary
- Location: Saint-Laurent, Quebec
- Opened: 1911
- Closed: 1988
- Time zone: CST (UTC−05:00)
  - Summer (DST): CDT (UTC−04:00)
- Elevation AMSL: 120 ft (37 m)
- Coordinates: 45°31′N 073°43′W

Map
- Location in Quebec

Runways
Direction	Length		Surface
Direction	ft	m	Surface
~~06/24~~	~~4,000~~	~~1,219~~
~~10/28~~	~~8,792~~	~~2,680~~
~~15/33~~	~~4,000~~	~~1,219~~

Cartierville Airport (formerly IATA: YCV, ICAO: CYCV) was an airport in Saint-Laurent, Quebec, now a borough of Montreal. The airport (Bois-Franc Field when it opened in 1911 and during World War I) was decommissioned in 1988 and turned into the Bois-Franc neighbourhood. It was located next to Route 117 (or Boul. Marcel Laurin/ Boul. Laurentien) and the terminal buildings were accessed via Boul. Henri-Bourassa (formerly Rue Bois Franc), near the present Bois-Franc REM Station.

As the 10/28 runway's threshold was very close to Bois-Franc Boulevard (now Boul. Henri-Bourassa West), a traffic light was installed and automobile traffic was stopped by Air Traffic Control whenever a plane was about to take off from runway 28 or land on runway 10.

In 1928 Reid Aircraft Company (and shortly by Curtiss Aeroplane & Motor Company as Curtiss-Reid) opened a plant to make Curtiss-Reid Rambler, then in 1935 Noorduyn opened an aircraft plant followed by Canadian Vickers in 1942. At one time, Canadair Plant One used the airfield to fly off completed CL-215, CL-415, Challenger bizjets and Canadair Regional Jets. The airport was closed to private and commercial passenger traffic in the 1980s when it became apparent that traffic from the nearby Dorval Airport was making it hazardous for chartered flights and flight schools to operate on the site. This left Bombardier as the sole user.

Prior to Bombardier's acquisition of Canadair, Canadair had already acquired the title to the airport, and had initiated a subdivision development planning.

Among the aircraft test-flown there was the Canadair CL-84 Dynavert tilt-wing VTOL airplane.

== See also ==
- List of abandoned airports in Canada
- Leaside Aerodrome
- Armoury Heights Field

== Notes ==
- Before becoming an airfield, it was the site of the Bois-Franc Pologrounds.
- Before the First World War, Cartierville Airport was first known as Bois-Franc Field.
- RAF pilot Captain Brian Peck flew the first airmail flight in Canada from Bois-Franc Field to Toronto's Leaside Field in 1918, carrying 120 letters.
- In 1955, an effort by the MP for Saint-Laurent was made to rename the airport as Saint-Laurent Airport.
- On July 27, 1960, a Pan Am 707, bound for Dorval Airport in Montreal, Quebec, mistakenly landed at Cartierville.
- The first CL-600 Canadair Challenger bizjet took flight on November 8, 1978 from the airport.
- Before being decommissioned, Cartierville was the oldest continuously used flying field in Canada. It was first used in June 1911.

== Airport statistics ==
- Runway length: 8,792 ft (2,680 m).
- Runway elevation: 120 ft (36.6 m).
- WAC: 906
