= RCAF Station Dafoe =

Defunct military installation in Saskatchewan, Canada

- Dafoe, Saskatchewan; Near Dafoe, Saskatchewan in Canada

Site information
- Operator: Formerly Royal Canadian Air Force

Location
- Coordinates: 51°55′58″N 104°34′01″W

Airfield information
- Identifiers: IATA: none, ICAO: none
- Elevation: 1,740 ft (530 m) AMSL
Runways
Direction	Length and surface
18/00	3,300 ft (1,000 m) asphalt
9/27	3,300 ft (1,000 m) asphalt
13/31	3,300 ft (1,000 m) asphalt

RCAF Station Dafoe was a Second World War Royal Canadian Air Force station located near Dafoe, Saskatchewan, Canada. The station was home to the British Commonwealth Air Training Plan's No. 5 Bombing and Gunnery School. The school opened January 1941 and closed January 1945. Aircraft used included the Westland Lysander, Bristol Bolingbroke, Avro Anson, and Fairey Battle.

== Aerodrome information ==
In approximately 1942 the aerodrome was listed as RCAF Aerodrome - Dafoe, Saskatchewan at 51°56′N 104°34′W with a variation of 18 degrees east and elevation of 1,740 ft (530 m). The aerodrome was listed with three runways as follows:

Runway name	Length	Width	Surface
16/34	2,690 ft (820 m)	150 ft (46 m)	Paved
7/25	2,700 ft (820 m)	150 ft (46 m)	Paved
12/30	2,760 ft (840 m)	150 ft (46 m)	Paved

== Notable trainees ==
- William Arthur Sevicke-Jones, NZ429050 LAC Jones W A S, attended from 4 October 1943 to 15 November 1943.

== See also ==
- List of airports in Saskatchewan
- List of Royal Canadian Air Force stations
- List of defunct airports in Canada
