= York Cemetery, Toronto =

Cemetery in Ontario, Canada

York Cemetery
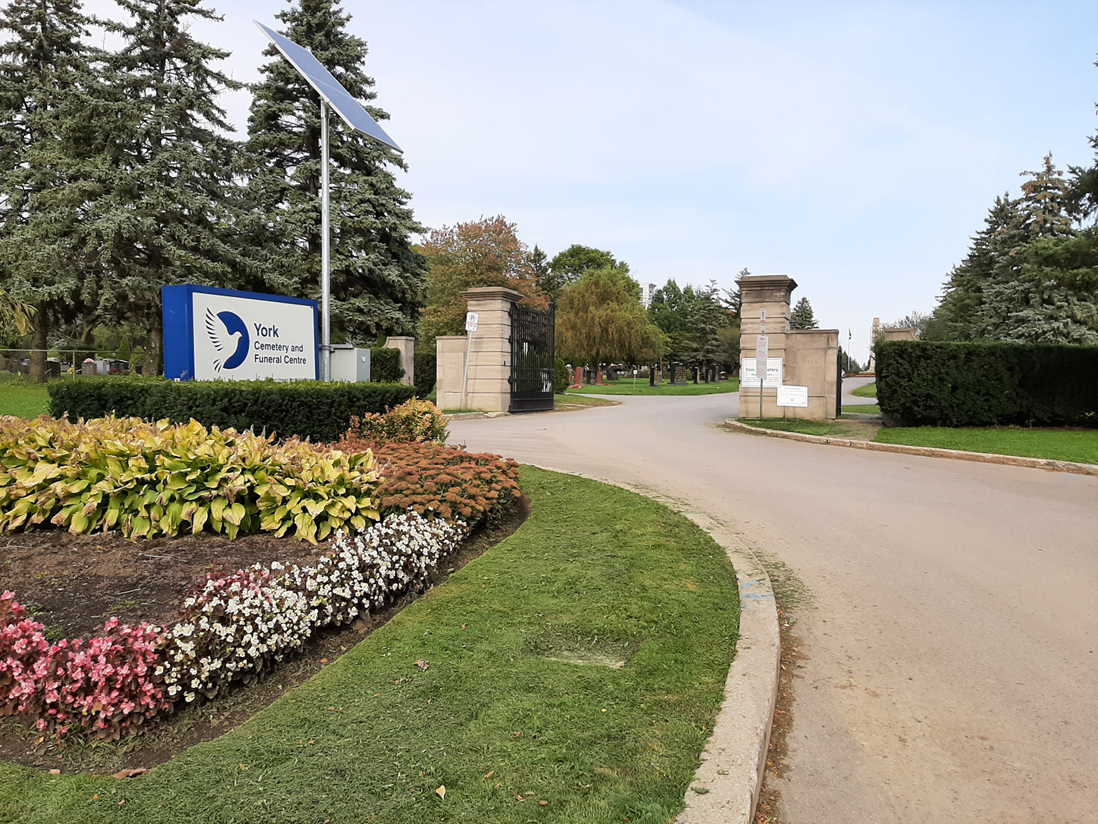
- Cemetery entrance pictured in October 2024
- Interactive map of York Cemetery

Details
- Established: 1948
- Location: 160 Beecroft Road; Toronto, Ontario, Canada
- Coordinates: 43°45′58″N 79°25′00″W
- Type: Non-profit; Non-denominational
- Style: Rural
- Owned by: Mount Pleasant Group
- Size: 172 acres
- No. of interments: >12,000
- Website: mountpleasantgroup.com
- Find a Grave: York Cemetery

York Cemetery is a cemetery located in the North York area of Toronto, Ontario, Canada operated by the Mount Pleasant Group of Cemeteries.

== History ==
The site of York Cemetery was originally a property farmed by Joseph Shepard, who bought the land in 1805. The brick farm house on the property was constructed in 1837 by Joseph's son, Michael. Prior to the 1940s, the land was also used as the short-lived Willowdale Airfield.

In 1916, the Toronto General Burying Grounds (now the Mount Pleasant Group of Cemeteries) bought the property but didn't start to convert the 172 acres (70 ha) for cemetery use until 1946, two years before the cemetery officially opened in 1948. The cemetery once fronted on Yonge Street, but in 1966, eighteen and a half acres were sold to the city of North York (now part of Toronto). The cemetery has continued to develop, with the addition of a chapel and reception centre, and also the newly built "garden of remembrance".

== Notable interments ==
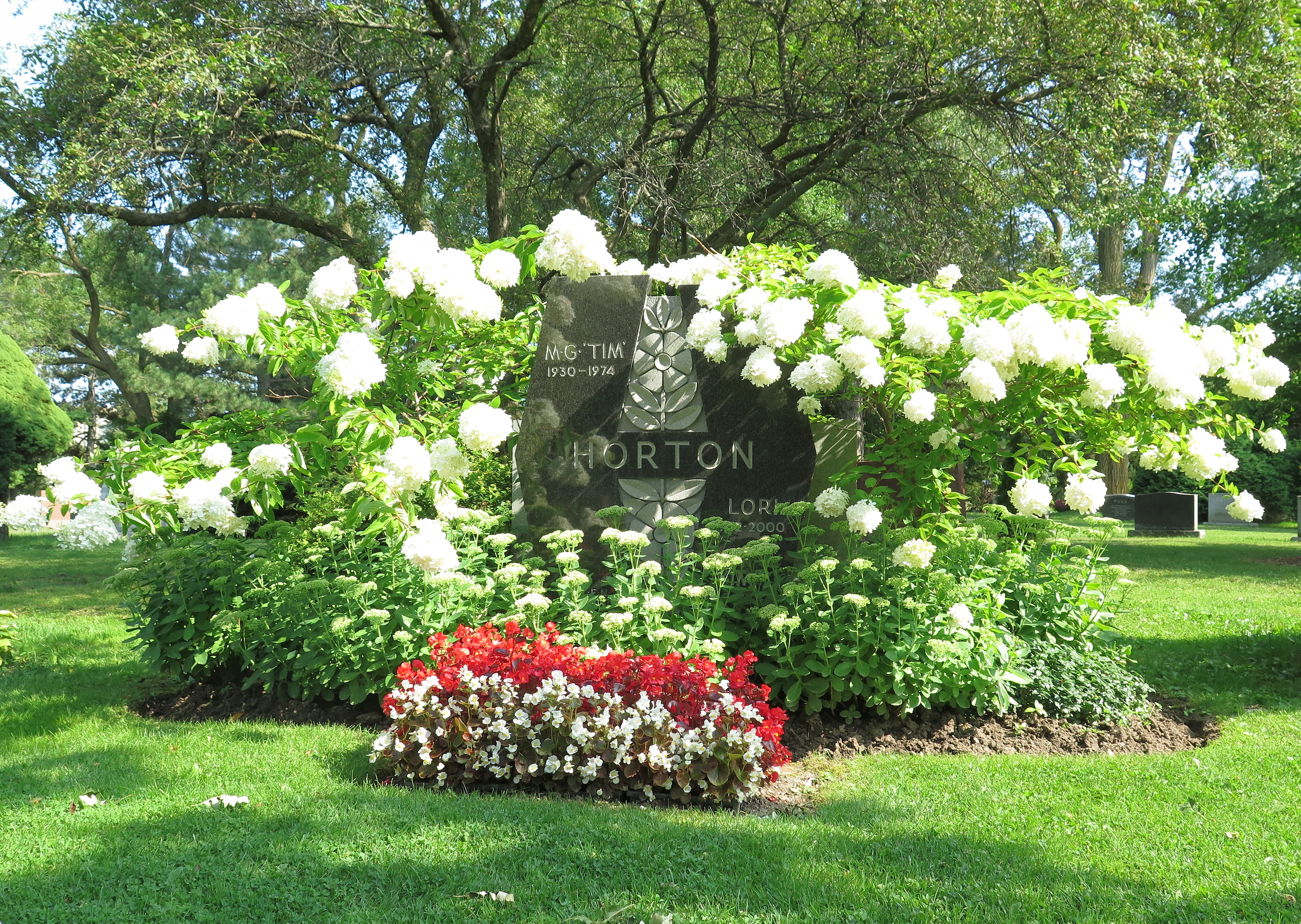
Hockey player Tim Horton

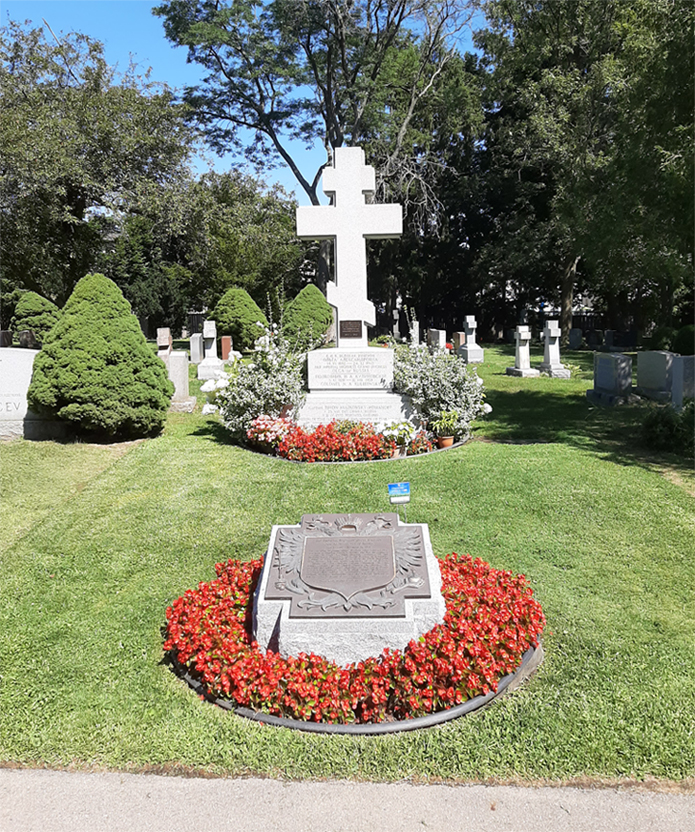
Grand Duchess Olga Alexandrovna of Russia

- Arnold Chan (1967–2017), Member of Parliament for Scarborough-Agincourt 2014–2017 and Deputy Government House Leader
- Barbara Frum (1937–1992), Canadian television news anchor and journalist (CBC)
- Nick Harbaruk (1943–2011), Polish-born Canadian WHA and NHL hockey player
- Murray Henderson (1921–2013), hockey player
- Tim Horton (1930–1974), former Toronto Maple Leafs player and co-founder of Tim Hortons
- Bob Jarvis (1935–2017), Canadian lawyer and politician
- Zoran Kosanović (1956–1998), Serbian-Canadian table tennis player
- Cynthia Lai (1954–2022), Politician, represented Ward 23 Scarborough North on the Toronto City Council
- Her Imperial Highness Grand Duchess Olga Alexandrovna of Russia (1882–1960), along with her husband Captain Nikolai Kulikovsky (1881–1958)
- Jesse Nilsson (1977–2003), Canadian television actor
- Henry Howey Robson (1897–1964), British-born recipient of the Victoria Cross
- Percy Saltzman (1915–2007), Canadian meteorologist, first weatherman on Canadian television
- Bruce Smith (1949–2013), professional football player

== See also ==
- List of cemeteries in Toronto
