= Henry Howey Robson =

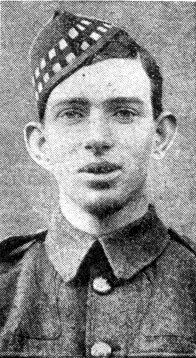
- Born: 27 May 1894; South Shields, County Durham
- Died: 4 March 1964 (aged 70); Toronto, Ontario, Canada
- Burial place: York Cemetery, Toronto
- Military career
- Allegiance: United Kingdom
- Branch: British Army
- Rank: Private
- Service number: No. 11340
- Unit: Royal Scots
- Conflicts: World War I
- Awards: Victoria Cross

Henry Howey Robson VC (18 February 1894 – 4 March 1964) was an English recipient of the Victoria Cross, the highest and most prestigious award for gallantry in the face of the enemy that can be awarded to British and Commonwealth forces.

Robson was 20 years old, and a private in the Second Battalion, The Royal Scots (The Lothian Regiment), British Army during World War I when the following deed took place for which he was awarded the Cross.

For most conspicuous bravery near Kemmel on the 14th December, 1914, during an attack on the German position, when he left his trench under a very heavy fire and rescued a wounded Non-commissioned Officer, and subsequently for making an attempt to bring another wounded man into cover, whilst exposed to a severe fire: In this attempt he was at once wounded, but persevered in his efforts until rendered helpless by being shot a second time.

His Victoria Cross is now displayed at the Royal Scots Museum in the Edinburgh Castle of Scotland.

Robson moved to Canada in 1923 (after selling his medals for the trip), married Alice Maud Martin and served as a Sergeant-at-Arms in the Ontario Parliament in Toronto from 1941 to 1947. He retired as information clerk in 1954 and died at Sunnybrook Hospital in 1964.

== Bibliography ==
- Gliddon, Gerald (2011) [1994]. 1914. VCs of the First World War. The History Press. ISBN 978-0752459080.
- Whitworth, Alan (2015). VCs of the North: Cumbria, Durham & Northumberland. Pen and Sword Books. ISBN 978-1473848221.
