= Royal Flying Corps Canada =

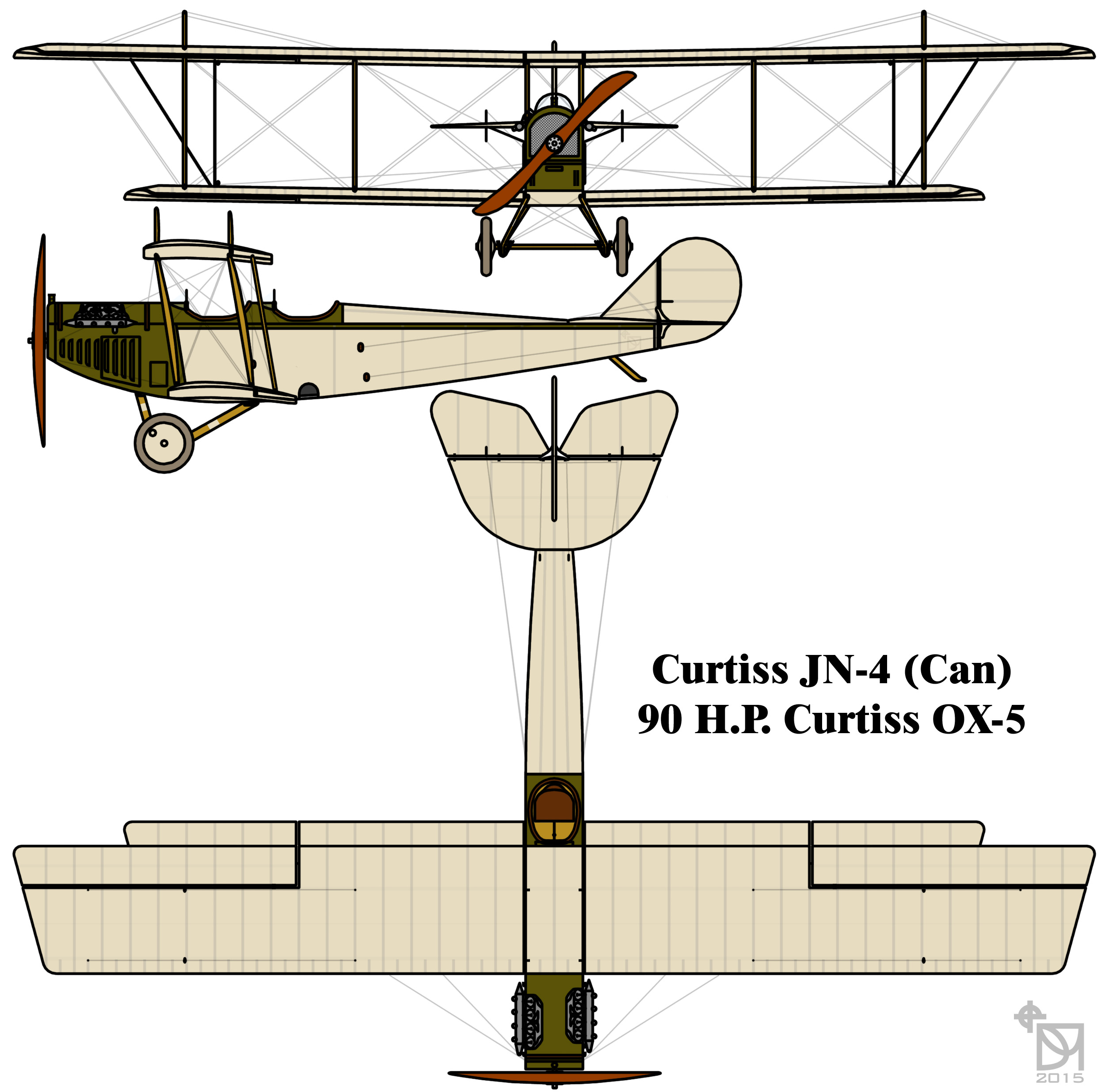
- 3-axis representation of the Curtiss JN-4 (Can), the aircraft type used by the Royal Flying Corps Canada
- Active: 1917 – 1 April 1918 (as RFCC); 1 April 1918 - 1919 (as RAF(C))
- Country: Canada
- Allegiance: Monarch of the United Kingdom
- Branch: Army
- Type: Army military aviation corps
- Role: military aviation training
- Engagements: World War I

Commanders
- General Officer Commanding: Brigadier-General Cuthbert Hoare

Aircraft flown
- Trainer: Curtiss JN-4 (Can)

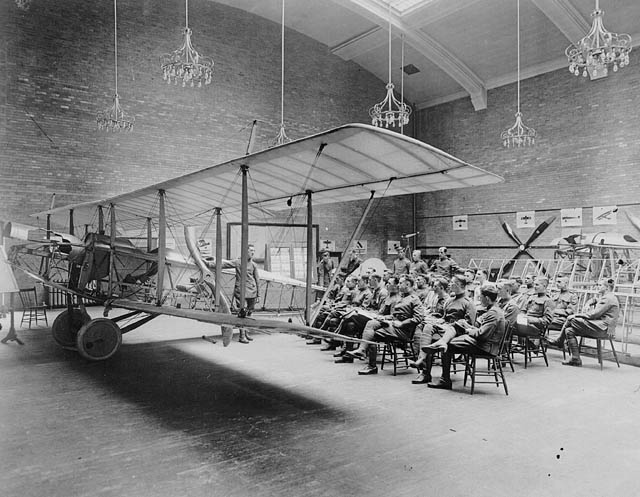
Lecture on rigging at the University of Toronto's School of Aviation, RFC Canada.

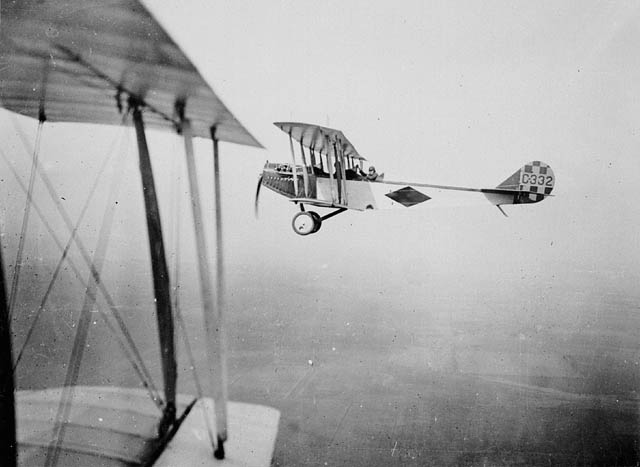
RFC Canada Curtiss JN-4 (Can) in 1917.

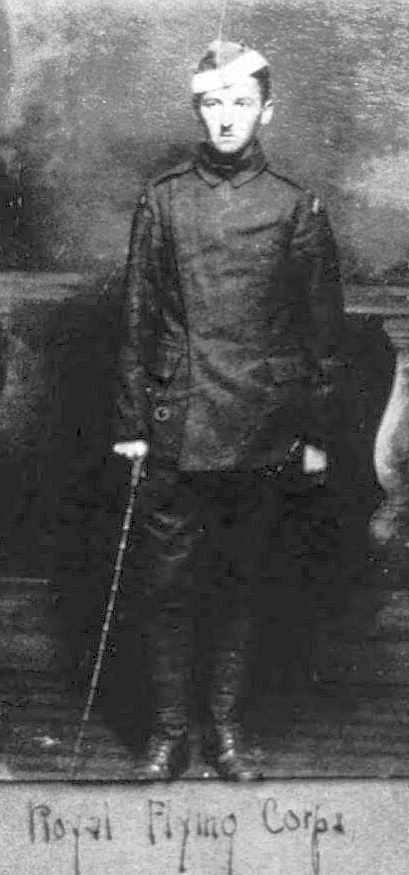
American writer William Faulkner in Toronto whilst a cadet at the School of Military Aeronautics at the University of Toronto. In July 1918, Faulkner enlisted with the Royal Air Force in Canada.

The Royal Flying Corps Canada (RFC Canada, or RFCC) was a military aviation training organisation of the British Royal Flying Corps located in Canada during the First World War. It began operating in 1917.

== Background ==
As the First World War progressed, Great Britain found that it needed more trained pilots and aircrew, and more training facilities. Training was provided both by the Curtiss Aviation School at Long Branch near Toronto (land plane training), and Hanlan's Point on Toronto Island (for flying boat training), and also in the United States.

The British realised that thousands of Canadians and Americans had joined British flying operations, and more wanted to join, so it made sense to open British air training stations in Canada. Canada also had space for such facilities. After much negotiation with the Canadian government, the Royal Flying Corps (RFC), commanded in Canada by Lieutenant-Colonel (later Brigadier-General) Cuthbert Hoare, began operating several training stations in southern Ontario. The Royal Flying Corps Canada was created in late January 1917.

== Training ==
Stations were opened at Camp Borden (main training site) in Beamsville, Hamilton (armament school) in North Toronto (Armour Heights (School of Special Flying), Leaside and Long Branch), and Deseronto (Mohawk and Rathburn). Cadet Officer courses were run at the University of Toronto.

The JN-4 (Canadian) (Canuck) was used for training; 500 Avro 504Ks had been ordered, but only one had been completed in Canada before the war ended in November 1918, and it was not used.

== Canadian-American training ==
General Hoare made several agreements with U.S. Brigadier-General George O. Squier (US Army Signal Corps) and the US Aircraft Production Board. Squier had overall responsibility for the US Army's air service, which was short of flight instructors. The RFC released five experienced American pilots to the US Army, where they became squadron commanders. The US Air Board acquiesced in the British opening a recruiting office in New York City, ostensibly to recruit British citizens, but it also solicited US citizens, of whom about 300 were successfully enlisted.

The RFCC would also train many US Army flight personnel: 400 pilots; 2,000 ground-crew members; and 20 equipment officers. These Americans would then collect aircraft and equipment from the United Kingdom, before coming under RFC control in France. Ten American squadrons would train in Canada during the summer of 1917, while RFCC squadrons were allowed to train during the winter in Fort Worth, Texas, providing training not only for the Canadians but also for the relatively inexperienced American pilots.

== End of the war ==
When the Royal Flying Corps became the Royal Air Force (RAF) on 1 April 1918, the unit became known as Royal Air Force Canada (RAF(C)).

During the last two years of WW1, 3,135 pilots and 137 observers trained in Canada and Texas for both the RFC and the new Royal Air Force (RAF). Of these trainees, 2,624 went to Europe for operational duty.

The RAF(C) was succeeded by the establishment of the Canadian Air Force in 1920, which became the Royal Canadian Air Force on 1 April 1924.
