= Leaside Aerodrome =

Former airfield in Leaside, Ontario

- IATA: none; ICAO: none

Summary
- Location: Leaside, Ontario
- Opened: 1917
- Closed: 1944
- Built: 1917
- In use: 1917–1931, June 1942 – March 1944
- Coordinates: 43°42′46″N 079°21′33″W

Map
- Location within Toronto

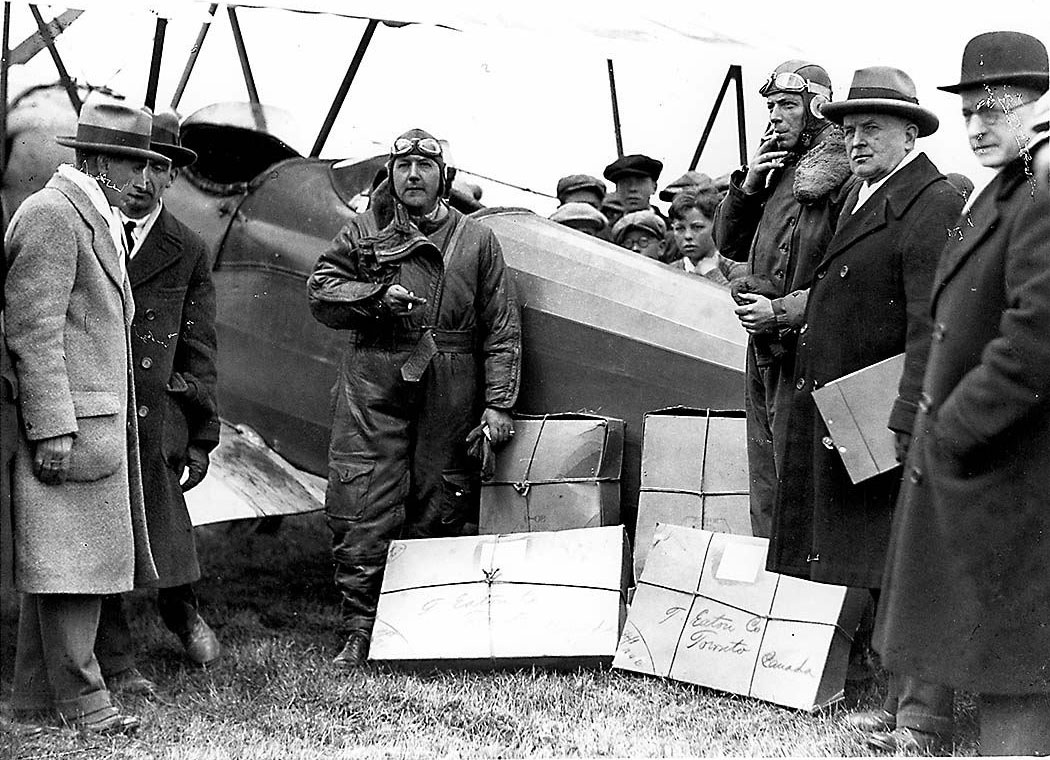
The first regular air express delivery in April 1928

Leaside Aerodrome was an airport in the Town of Leaside, Ontario (now a neighbourhood of Toronto). It opened in 1917 as a Royal Flying Corps airfield during the First World War.

== History ==
Unlike nearby Armour Heights Field, the airfield was not abandoned at the end of the war, but was acquired for use by the Toronto Flying Club. During the war, the airstrip became the site of Canada's first delivery of airmail on 24 June 1918 when pilot Brian Peck delivered 120 letters from Montreal (taking off from Bois-Franc Field). This delivery was initially organized at the behest of some of his friends in Montreal who wanted letters delivered to Toronto; however when the Post Office Department heard of the plans, they gathered together the letters as a test of an airmail system. A modern plaque at the site of Leaside Aerodrome reads: "At 10:12 a.m. on 24 June 1918, Captain Brian Peck of the Royal Air Force and mechanic Corporal C.W. Mathers took off from the Bois Franc Polo Grounds in Montreal in a JN-4 Curtiss two-seater airplane. They had with them the first bag of mail to be delivered by air in Canada. Wind and rain buffetted the small plane and forced it to make refuelling stops at Kingston and Deseronto. Finally, at 4:55 p.m., Peck and Mathers landed at the Leaside Aerodrome (immediately southwest of here). The flight had been arranged by a civilian organization, the Aerial League of the British Empire, to demonstrate that aviation was the way of the future." A regular air express service began in April 1928.

== Closure ==
The Toronto Flying Club closed the airport in 1931. During the war, the area to the south, between the airstrip and the former Northern Railway of Canada lines, were intensely developed as Research Enterprises Limited, joining a number of other small industrial firms. Between June 1942 and March 1944, the Royal Canadian Air Force (RCAF) operated No. 1 RDF (Radio Direction Finding) School at Leaside, and the station was briefly known as RCAF Station Leaside. Although the airport was replaced with industrial uses, the last hangar (south as the north hangar used to occupy the vacant gap until Eglinton Avenue was extended from Laird east to Don Valley) was not removed until 1971.

In the post-war era, the area remained the site of heavy and light industry until the turn of the century, when many of the industries left the area. The area is now primarily home to small industrial businesses and big box stores.

== In literature ==
The first short story published by Nobel Prize recipient William Faulkner, Landing in Luck, was likely set at the Leaside Aerodrome. While a student at the School of Military Aeronautics at the University of Toronto in 1918, Faulkner would have had many opportunities to observe the operations at this airfield.

== See also ==
- List of abandoned airports in Canada
