= RCAF Station Mossbank =

Former RCAF station

- Mossbank, Saskatchewan; Near Mossbank, Saskatchewan in Canada

Site information
- Operator: Formerly Royal Canadian Air Force

Location
- Location within Saskatchewan

Site history
- In use: 1940-1944

Garrison information
- Occupants: No. 2 Bombing and Gunnery School(1940-1944)

Airfield information
- Identifiers: IATA: none, ICAO: none
- Elevation: 2,320 ft (710 m) AMSL
Runways
Direction	Length and surface
18/36	3,450 ft (1,050 m) Hard Surface
12/30	3,450 ft (1,050 m) Hard Surface
6/24	3,400 ft (1,000 m) Hard Surface

RCAF Station Mossbank opened 28 Oct 1940 and was home to No. 2 Bombing and Gunnery School. The station was a Second World War, British Commonwealth Air Training Plan training facility located near Mossbank, Saskatchewan, Canada. It was similar to the gunnery school at Dafoe, Saskatchewan. The proximity to a lake (Old Wives Lake) was important since the lake could be used for bombing and gunnery practice. Aircraft used include the Westland Lysander, Bristol Bolingbroke, Avro Anson, and Fairey Battle. The school closed 15 December 1944, after having graduated 2,539 air bombers and 3,702 air gunners.

== Aerodrome ==
In approximately 1942 the aerodrome was listed at 49°56′N 105°52′W with a Var. 18 degrees E and elevation of 2,300 ft (700 m). Three runways were listed as follows:

Runway Name	Length	Width	Surface
18/36	3,450 ft (1,050 m)	150 ft (46 m)	Hard surfaced
12/30	3,450 ft (1,050 m)	150 ft (46 m)	Hard surfaced
6/24	3,400 ft (1,000 m)	150 ft (46 m)	Hard surfaced

== RCAF Mossbank today ==
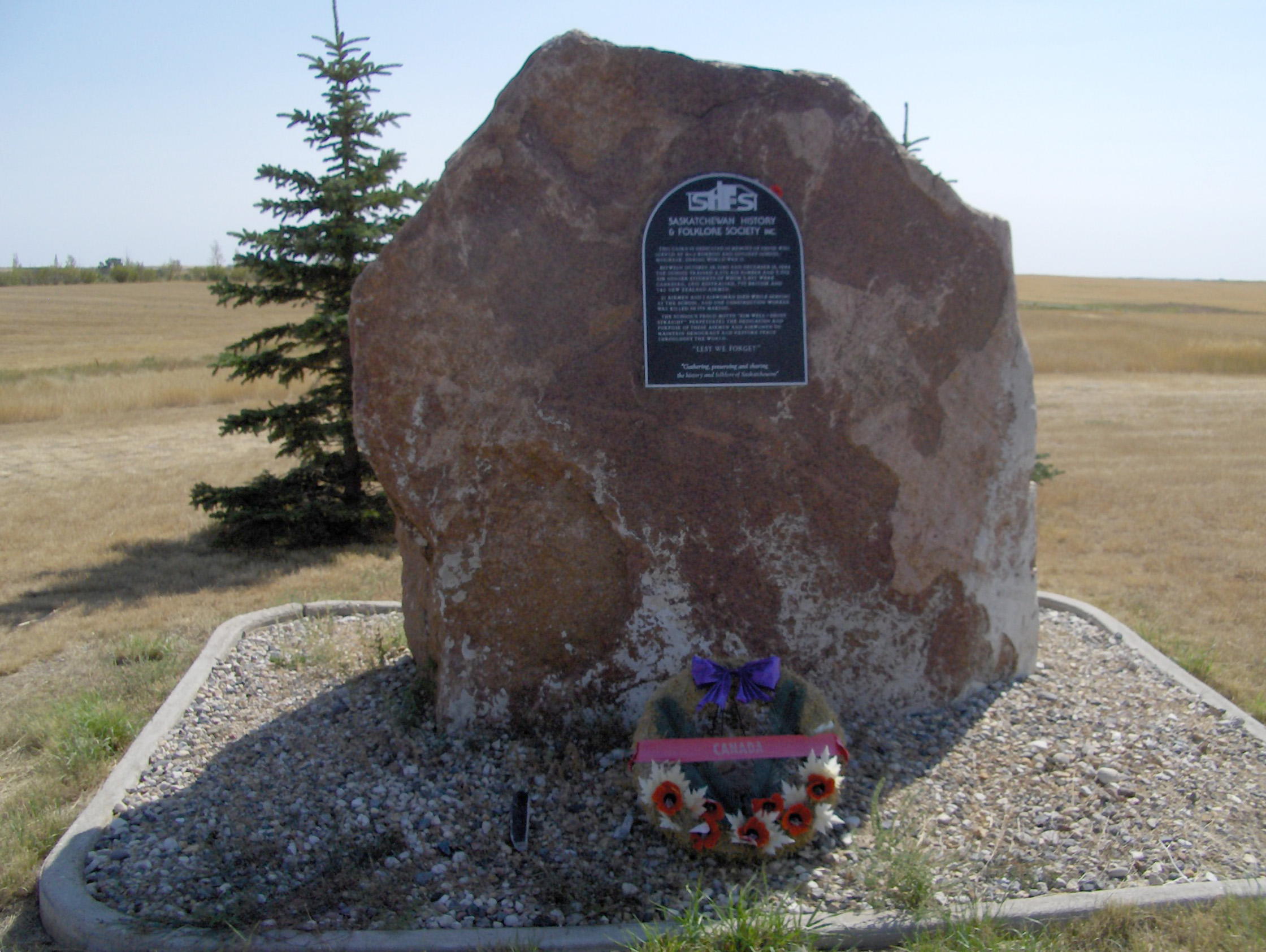
Cairn at the location of the former base

Today the airfield is abandoned with only the gunnery backstop, hangar pads and weedy, broken runways to see. It is used as a "practice airshow airport" for 431 Air Demonstration Squadron (The Snowbirds) as it is conveniently located in their training area CYR 303 (restricted).

On December 10, 2004, a collision between two CT-114 Tutor jets from the Snowbirds occurred during training over Mossbank. The collision led to the death of Capt. Miles Selby. Capt. Chuck Mallett survived the collision and subsequent crash after he was "thrown out" as the airplane disintegrated.

Selby Road on the eastern edge of the airbase has been dedicated in the memory of Capt. Miles Selby.

A cairn is located at the entrance of the Mossbank Golf Course, which borders the old base. The cairn is dedicated to all the people that have served at Mossbank.

Turvey Centre, located near IPSCO (Interprovincial Steel and Pipe Corporation)(new name is Evares as of 2008) in Regina, was originally an aircraft hangar from Mossbank. The building, which now has a stage and second floor balcony, is now used for events such as wedding receptions, hobby shows, swap meets and other activities.
