= Long Branch Aerodrome =

Former airfield in Ontario, Canada

Coordinates: 43°34′26″N 079°33′16″W

Location just outside Toronto

Long Branch Aerodrome was an airfield located west of Toronto, Ontario and just east of Port Credit (today a neighbourhood in Mississauga), in the community of Lakeview and was Canada's first aerodrome. The airport was opened by the Curtiss Flying School, part of the Curtiss Aeroplane and Motor Company, as a pilot training school in 1915. In 1917 the airport was run by the Royal Flying Corps (RFC), and then closed in 1919. It is recognized by the existence of Aviation Road in Mississauga's Lakeview neighbourhood and a historical plaque. The aerodrome was named after the community of Long Branch, now a neighbourhood in Toronto.

The aerodrome was one of several in the Toronto area, including three near Downsview. For many years it was the site of Ontario Power Generation's Lakeview Generating Station. As of 2009 it became a brownfield site awaiting redevelopment.

== History ==
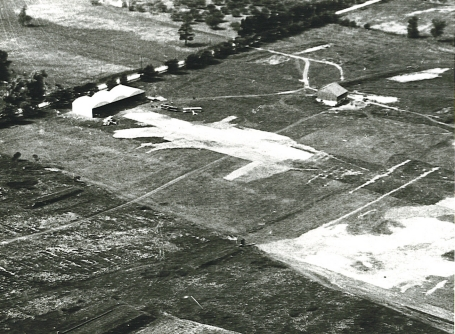
Aerial image of Long Branch Aerodrome in 1916

The airfield was opened on May 20, 1915, by Curtiss Aeroplanes and Motors Company for the Royal Naval Air Service and the Royal Flying Corps. Aircraft such as the Curtiss JN-4 "Jenny" and the Curtiss F-type flying boats soon became a common sight at the airfield. John Alexander Douglas McCurdy, the first person to fly an airplane in the British Empire, was hired as the airport's first manager. The airport had a small corrugated metal hangar with space for three small aircraft and a barnhouse. There was no runway, but a grass/dirt strip for landing.

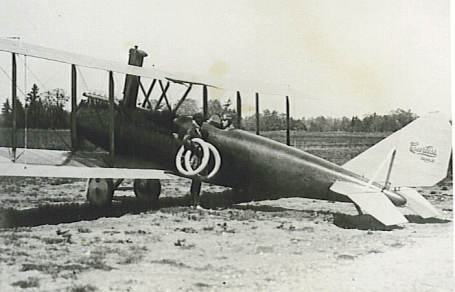
Image of Curtiss airplane at Long Branch Aerodrome in 1917

In January 1917, the newly designated Royal Flying Corps Canada, opened the RFC training centre at Long Branch. The Long Branch training centre also provided instruction on flying boats at nearby Hanlan's Point on Toronto Islands, the first seaplane base in Canada. By July 1917, the flight school relocated to Armour Heights Field. Long Branch became the Cadet Ground Training School for the Royal Flying Corps. Both the school and the aerodrome closed in 1919. During World War II, the former aerodrome served initially as Non-Permanent Active Militia's No 21 Training Centre and then as an army small arms training centre.

After the war, the Lakeview Armoury was established on the site, but was demolished in the 1950s.

In 1967 Richmond College, predecessor to Canada Christian College, established their first campus here.

== See also ==
- List of abandoned airports in Canada
- List of airports in the Greater Toronto Area
