= RAF Anwick =

Former decoy Royal Air Force station

RAF Anwick ~~Royal Flying Corps Aerodrome Anwick~~
- Near Anwick, Lincolnshire in England
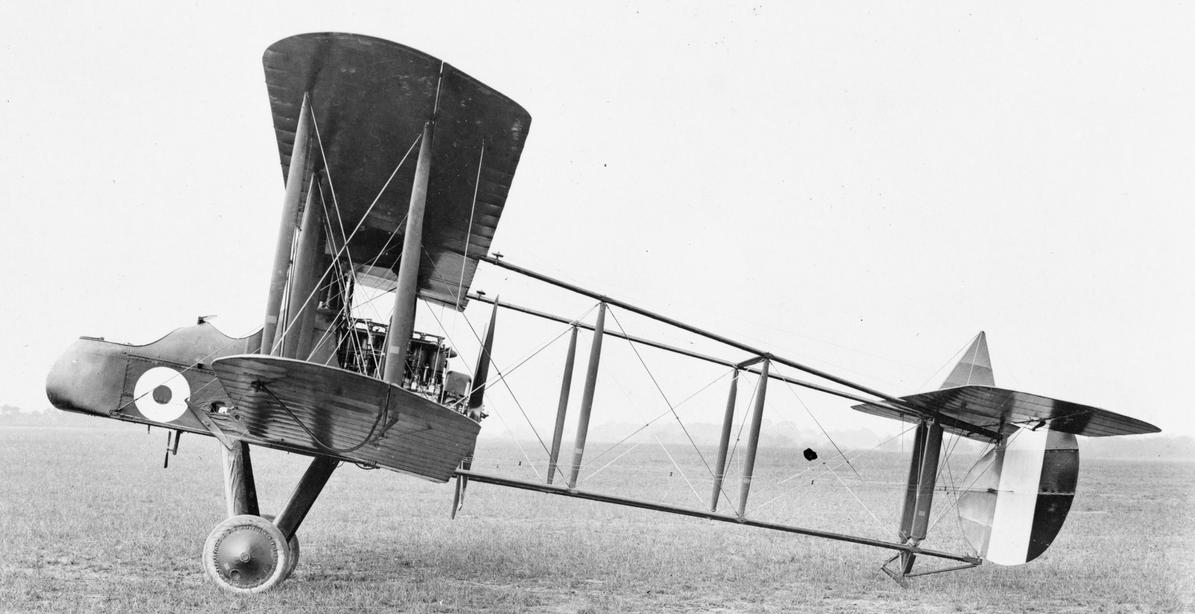
- An FE.2b aircraft which was one of the first types to be flown from Anwick

Site information
- Type: Military airfield. Decommissioned and abandoned in August 1942; Airfield active only during the First World War. During the Second World War acted as a decoy site for RAF Digby.
- Owner: Air Ministry
- Operator: Royal Air Force (1918-1919 & 1939-1942); Royal Flying Corps (1916-1918)

Location
- Shown within Lincolnshire
- Coordinates: 53°02′52″N 000°21′00″W

Site history
- Built: 1916
- In use: 1916-1919 & 1939-1942

Airfield information
- Elevation: 9 metres (30 ft) AMSL
Runways
Direction	Length and surface
00/00	Grass
00/00	Grass
00/00	Grass
- Airfield code was X0AN

Royal Air Force Anwick or more simply RAF Anwick is a former Second World War faux Royal Air Force decoy station near the village of Anwick, 21.3 mi (34.3 km) south east of the county town of Lincoln, Lincolnshire, England. The airfield was located in a field three quarters of a mile north-north-west of Anwick village.

Originally constructed and operated as a Royal Flying Corps aerodrome in September 1916 it closed between the wars, reopening in September 1939 as a Royal Air Force decoy site to divert bombing raids away from nearby RAF Digby, the closest active fighter airfield.

A minimal facility, even at the height of its active use, the airfield had only grass runways and no permanent brick buildings or hangars. All accommodation was of wooden and metal temporary construction. Within a few years of closing in 1942 there were no visible remains of the former flying facility, although a private landing strip and hangar now exist not far from the original aerodrome.

== History ==
The airfield opened in October 1916 as a Royal Flying Corps aerodrome with three grassed runways laid out in an equilateral triangle. The aerodrome remained busy throughout the First World War as a flying training establishment with a large number of aircraft present, flying mostly a motley assortment of de Havilland DH and Royal Aircraft Factory BE and FE marques.

The station was mothballed and placed on a care and maintenance basis between the wars. Surveyed in 1937 as a possible fighter base it was decided that the terrain and location was unsuitable for tarmac runways. Instead the grass runways were retained and the station was earmarked as a future decoy airfield, a role that started in September 1939.

The airfield was manned by shifts of eight airmen responsible for lighting flare lamps with a portable generator at night that simulated a runway in use, with the intention of drawing the attention of any German bombers looking to attack an airfield. More accurate electronic navigation aids during the later phases of the war rendered these efforts less useful and the practice was abandoned by 1942.

RAF Anwick was abandoned and dismantled in August 1942.

== Timeline and units of RAF Anwick ==
Date	Event or unit	Notes
September 1916	Opened as Royal Flying Corps Aerodrome Anwick	
September 1916	No. 38 Squadron RFC	Flying FE. 2b aircraft. Arrived from RFC Castle Bromwich commanded by Arthur Harris who later became Air Chief Marshal Harris and commander of Bomber Command in the Second World War. The squadron redeployed to Dunkirk in May 1918.
September 1916	No. 33 Squadron RFC	Flying Royal Aircraft Factory BE.2s and later Royal Aircraft Factory FE.2s the squadron was employed in the Home Defence role, guarding against German airship raids against northern England. The squadron also operated from Scampton, Kirton in Lindsey and Elsham Wolds aerodromes.
October 1917	No. 90 Squadron RFC	Renamed No. 90 Squadron RAF in April 1918 the squadron never saw active combat and was disbanded in August 1918.
April 1918	The station is renamed RAF Anwick	
November 1919	RAF Anwick closed and placed on a care and maintenance basis	
September 1939	RAF Anwick reopens as a decoy airfield for RAF Digby	
August 1942	RAF Anwick closed and dismantled	

== The airfield today ==
No sign of the airfield remains today, but there is a private landing strip and hangar at Anwick that are assumed to be sited close to or on the original aerodrome location. There is a small memorial plaque acknowledging the airfield's existence on a back minor north of Anwick.

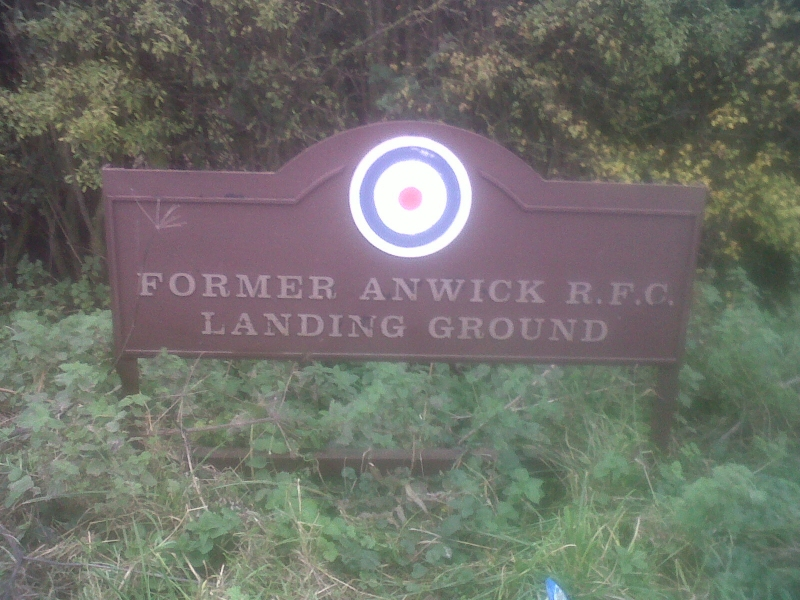
Memorial Plaque - RFC Landing ground at Anwick, Lincolnshire, UK. Later an RAF stations, now closed

== See also ==
- List of former Royal Air Force stations
