= Toronto Aerodrome =

Former aerodrome in Toronto, Ontario

- IATA: none; ICAO: none

Summary
- Location: Toronto, Ontario
- Opened: 1928
- Closed: 1939
- Coordinates: 43°44′56″N 79°27′39″W

Map
- Location within Toronto

Toronto Aerodrome, also known as Canadian Air Express Airport, was an aerodrome located in Toronto, Ontario, Canada.

One of the historical airfields of Canada, operated from 1928 to 1939, it was situated at the current Sheppard West station on Dufferin Street and Sheppard Avenue West. Toronto Aerodrome was one of several small airfields established in the Toronto area during the 1920s and 1930s. This aerodrome served as the principal custom entry point for aircraft coming to Toronto until 1939, when Malton airfield, now Toronto Pearson International Airport, became operational.

The aerodrome shared the site with the Toronto Flying Club (located at Dufferin Street and Wilson Avenue). The Toronto Flying Club's site is now the south end of Downsview Airport, TTC Wilson Complex.

Following the end of World War II into the 1960s, parts of the former airfield and surrounding farmland were developed into the residential neighbourhood of Wilson Heights and mixed commercial-industrial area of Downsview.

== See also ==
- List of defunct airports in Canada
- List of airports in the Greater Toronto Area
