= Armour Heights Field =

Former military airfield in Ontario, Canada

Coordinates: 43°44′27″N 079°25′20″W

Location in Toronto

Armour Heights Field was home to a Royal Flying Corps airfield in Toronto, Ontario, Canada during World War I, and was one of three in the area. Many RFC (later, Royal Air Force) pilots trained in Canada due to space availability. The airfield was opened in July 1917, but closed in 1919 as the war had ended. It was later developed as a residential development and remains as such today.

In 1917, an airfield was constructed near the site of the present Avenue Road and Route 401 interchange, and early the following year, the School of Special Flying opened. Student pilots received instruction on the basics of flight, aerial reconnaissance and aerial combat. However, the school had a short life as it closed around the time the Armistice was signed, on November 11, 1918.

The airfield had six hangars and a smaller structure housing offices.

In 1919, Bishop-Barker Airplanes Limited, founded by World War I Royal Flying Corps veterans William "Billy" Bishop and William Barker, took over the aerodrome. This business venture offered a charter services, aircraft sales and maintenance company, but was also short-lived and closed in 1921, and one of Canada's busiest airfields at the time was simply abandoned. Evidence of the field's tarmac was still visible until late 2015 on Ravenhill Road, but was paved over shortly after. This was the last piece of visual evidence of the aerodrome's existence.

The site is now the Canadian Forces College, which teaches the Command and Staff courses to officers of all three service branches. The only remnant of the Royal Flying Corps days is the stone building currently housing the Armour Heights Officers Mess, a Tudor-Revival home built in 1914 by George and Moorhouse Architects for Colonel Frederick Burton Robins (1866-1948), Honorary Colonel of the Toronto Scottish Regiment and real estate developer. Robins had acquired the land from family of original settler John Armour, for whom the area is now named.

== See also ==
- List of abandoned airports in Canada
- List of airports in the Greater Toronto Area
