= 415 Long Range Patrol Force Development Squadron =

- 415^{e} Escadron de développement de la force de patrouille à long rayon d'action
- Argent a swordfish proper variant
- Active: 1941-1945, 1961-2005, 2015-
- Country: Canada
- Branch: (Canada) Royal Canadian Air Force
- Role: Maritime patrol
- Part of: 14 Wing Greenwood
- Based at: CFB Greenwood
- Nickname: Swordfish
- Mottos: Latin: Ad metam, lit. 'To the mark'
- Engagements: Second World War: Battle of the Atlantic; Strategic bombing of Europe
- Battle honours: Atlantic, 1942; English Channel and North Sea, 1942–44; France and Germany, 1944–45; Biscay Ports, 1944; Ruhr, 1944–45; German Ports, 1944–45; Normandy 1944; Rhine; Biscay, 1942–43; Arabian Sea
- Website: www.canada.ca/en/air-force/corporate/squadrons/415-squadron.html

Aircraft flown
- Bomber: Handley Page Hampden, Vickers Wellington, Fairey Albacore, Handley Page Halifax
- Patrol: Lockheed CP-140 Aurora
- Reconnaissance: Canadair CP-107 Argus

415 Long Range Patrol Force Development Squadron is an air squadron of the Royal Canadian Air Force that first saw service during the Second World War.

== History ==
No. 415 Squadron was formed at Thorney Island on 20 August 1941 as a torpedo-bomber squadron, armed with Hampdens. It flew from a number of different bases, attacking enemy convoys and shipyards.

In March 1943 Acting Wing Commander George Howard David Evans, RAF, was appointed as Commanding Officer. A week later while flying an air test his aircraft crashed. On 8 April he undertook a night 'roam' over St Malo and Cherbourg armed with bombs but did not find a target. The following day he led 12 Hampdens to Docking and on 10 April six to St Eval. Later in the day he led five Hampdens in a torpedo attack against the Italian blockade runner Himalaya which was being escorted by eight German warships in the Bay of Biscay. His aircraft was hit several times by flak and was forced to turn back to Bordeaux. The squadron received the following signal: "From AOC 19 Group A/479 11 Apr. Please convey to W/Cdr Evans and those concerned my hearty congratulations on the great determination shown by himself, F/O Brenner, P/O Batten and F/Sgts Clive and McGee, in pressing home their important attack on the enemy blockade runner on 10 Apr in the face of the heaviest opposition." On 20 April 1943 Wing Commander Evans was awarded the Distinguished Flying Cross (DFC) for his previous service with 489 (RNZAF) Squadron. He handed over command of 415 Squadron on 1 August 1943 and was made a member of the Distinguished Service Order on 1 October 1943 for his leadership of the squadron.

In October 1943 the squadron was re-equipped with Wellingtons and Albacores; operating out of Bircham Newton, it became a successful E- and R-boat hunter unit. During the D-Day operations, it used its bombers to lay protective smoke screens for the Allied ships as they assaulted the coastline and landed troops ashore.

In July 1944, the squadron was transferred to RAF Bomber Command's No. 6 Group (RCAF) and transitioned to East Moor. There, it re-equipped with Halifax IIIs and began major bombing of German targets on 28/29 July, when it attacked Hamburg. For nine months afterward, it made bombing runs over important enemy targets in a variety of places until 25 April 1945, when it made its last mission, an attack on the gun batteries on the island of Wangerooge. The squadron disbanded in May, 1945.

The squadron was re-formed at RCAF Station Summerside in 1961 as a Maritime Air Command patrol squadron and flew Argus aircraft. No 415 continued in this role after unification of the Canadian Forces in 1968. In 1981 the Argus was replaced with the CP-140 Aurora and the Sqn was transferred to CFB Greenwood. It used these aircraft to conduct operations in the Arabian Sea after the 11 September 2001 terrorist attacks. In 2005 the squadron was stood down and consolidated with 405 Squadron.

On 5 June 2015, 415 Squadron was reformed as a tactical level force development squadron. 415 Squadron will incorporate the former Maritime Proving and Evaluation Unit, 14 Software Engineering Squadron and the LRP Advanced Training Flight. The re-activiation parade took place in front of the Greenwood Military Aviation Museum, installing the squadron's 30th commanding officer.
