= 404 Long Range Patrol and Training Squadron =

404 Long Range Patrol and Training Squadron RCAF
- 404^{e} Escadron de patrouille à longue portée et d'entraînement
- Active: 1941–1945, 1951–current
- Country: Canada
- Branch: Royal Canadian Air Force
- Role: Long-range patrol, training
- Size: 200
- Part of: 14 Wing Greenwood
- Based at: CFB Greenwood
- Motto: Ready to fight
- Battle honours: Atlantic, 1941–45; English Channel and North Sea, 1941–45; Baltic, 1944–45; Normandy, 1944; Biscay, 1943–44
- Website: canada.ca/en/air-force/corporate/squadrons/404-squadron.html

Insignia
- Identification symbol: The 404 Squadron's Badge shows a bison's head, representing the ferocity and power of the bison.

Aircraft flown
- Attack: Bristol Beaufighter, deHavilland Mosquito
- Bomber: Bristol Blenheim, Avro Lancaster
- Patrol: Lockheed CP-122 Neptune, Canadair CP-107 Argus, Lockheed CP-140 Aurora
- Trainer: CP-140A Arcturus
- Transport: Beech CT-128 Expeditor

404 Long Range Patrol and Training Squadron is a long range patrol and training squadron in the Royal Canadian Air Force. The squadron was originally No. 404 Squadron of the Royal Canadian Air Force (RCAF) and later the Canadian Forces Air Command.

== History ==
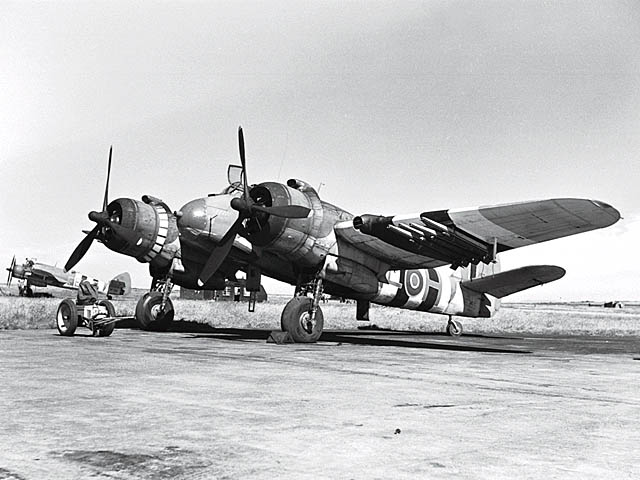
Beaufighter of No. 404 Squadron

The squadron was formed at Thorney Island in Sussex, England on 15 April 1941 under Royal Air Force operational control. It was a long-range fighter squadron which formed part of RAF Coastal Command, equipped with Bristol Blenheim Mk.IVs. The squadron moved to RAF Castletown, Caithness, Scotland on 20 June and to RAF Skitten on 27 July, before moving to RAF Dyce, Aberdeen on 9 October 1941, from where it began operations, providing fighter cover for convoys and carrying out shipping reconnaissance missions. Tasked with coastal patrol and attack, the squadron flew the Bristol Blenheim Mk.IV & later the Beaufighter. From May 1944 to September 1944 they were based at RAF Davidstow Moor in Cornwall, England.

As part of the RAF Dallachy strike wing of four Beaufighter-equipped squadrons, they took part in an attack on German ships on the Norwegian coast on 9 February 1945. The ships included a destroyer and "flak" ships as well as merchantmen. The ships were located in a fjord and German fighter aircraft scrambled in defence. As a result of the heavy losses to the Dallachy Wing the attack was subsequently called "Black Friday". The squadron disbanded on 25 May 1945.

The squadron was reformed on April 30, 1951, at RCAF Station Greenwood as 404 Maritime Reconnaissance Squadron. On 17 July 1956, 404 Squadron was redesignated as a Maritime Patrol squadron, and when the CP-140 Aurora came into service the title was changed again to 404 Maritime Patrol and Training Squadron. The current title is 404 Long Range Patrol and Training (LRP&T) Squadron.

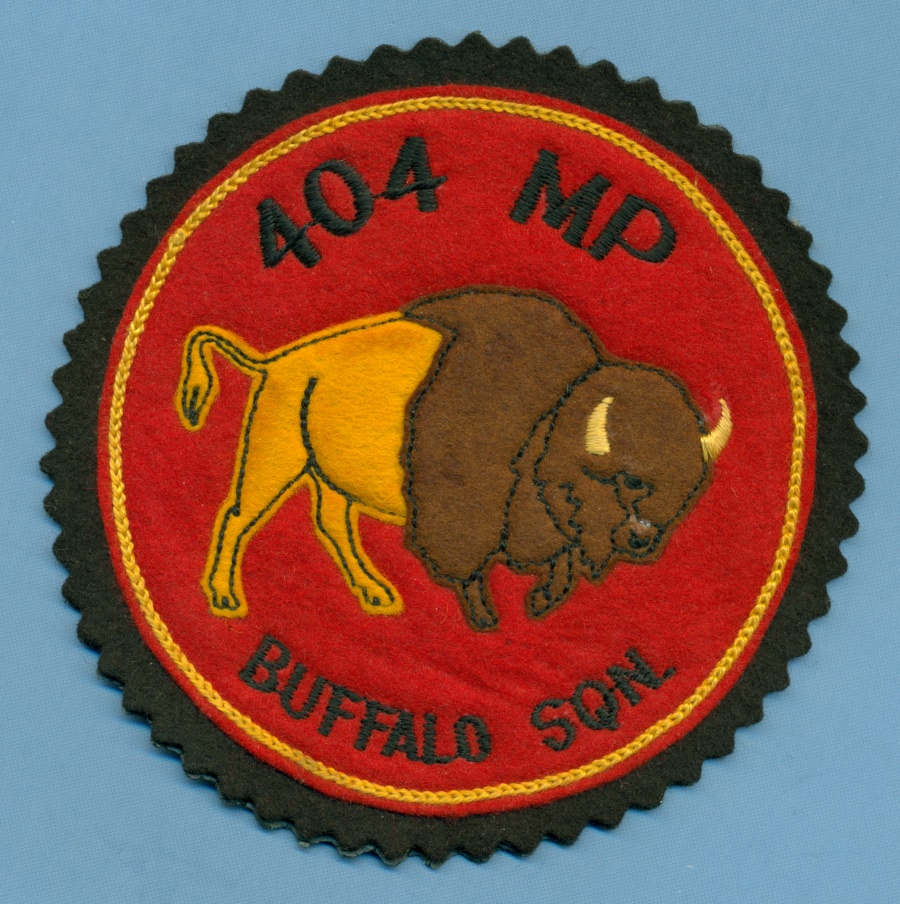
RCAF 404 Buffalo Squadron, MP (Maritime Patrol) jacket patch manufactured by Crest Craft and possibly used between 1956 and the early 60's.

Currently, 404 Sqn serves as the Operational Training Unit (OTU) for Aircrew and Maintenance personnel who work on the CP140 Aurora.

== Aircraft operated ==
- Bristol Blenheim
- Bristol Beaufighter
- De Havilland Mosquito
- Avro Lancaster
- Beech Expeditor
- Lockheed Neptune
- Canadair Argus
- Lockheed CP-140 Aurora and CP-140A Arcturus (trainer for CP-140)

== Notable personnel ==
- Allan Bundy
- Ken Gatward
