= Lockheed CP-140 Aurora =

Canadian maritime patrol aircraft

CP-140 Aurora CP-140A Arcturus
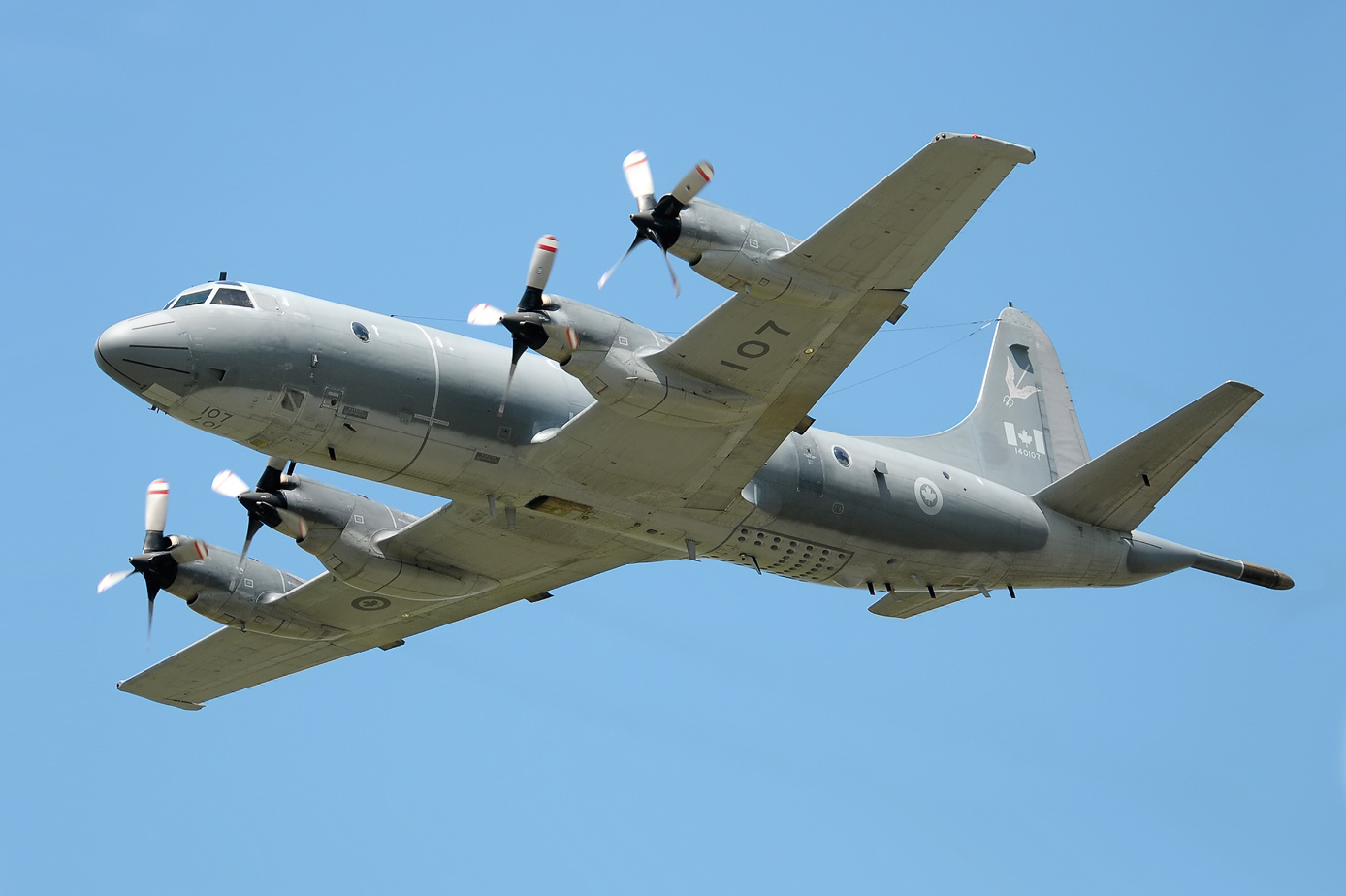
- CP-140 Aurora 140107 flying at John C. Munro Hamilton International Airport near Mount Hope, Ontario

General information
- Type: Maritime patrol aircraft (CP-140); MPA trainer aircraft (CP-140A)
- Manufacturer: Lockheed Corporation
- Status: Active (CP-140M only)
- Primary user: Royal Canadian Air Force
- Number built: 21 (18 CP-140M + 3 CP-140A)

History
- Introduction date: 1980
- First flight: 22 March 1979 (CP-140)
- Retired: 2011 (CP-140A only)
- Developed from: Lockheed P-3 Orion

The Lockheed CP-140 Aurora is a maritime patrol aircraft operated by the Royal Canadian Air Force. The aircraft is based on the Lockheed P-3 Orion airframe, but mounts the electronics suite of the Lockheed S-3 Viking. "Aurora" refers to the Roman goddess of dawn who flies across the sky each morning ahead of the sun. Aurora also refers to the Aurora Borealis, the "northern lights", that are prominent over northern Canada and the Arctic Ocean.

The CP-140A Arcturus was a related variant used primarily for pilot training and coastal surface patrol missions.

== Design and development ==
The CP-140 Aurora is very similar externally to the Lockheed P-3C Orion (Canadian ESM wingtip pods instead of the American ESM wing pod), but is different internally, using two sets of mission systems that were first installed in yet another Lockheed anti-submarine warfare aircraft, the carrier-based S-3A Viking. The aircraft's sensors are primarily intended for anti-submarine warfare (ASW) work but are also capable of maritime surveillance, counter-drug and search-and-rescue missions. The CP-140 is Canada's only strategic Intelligence Surveillance and Reconnaissance (ISR) aircraft, conducting long range missions over land, water and littoral areas. These missions are flown in support of Canadian Joint Operations Command, the RCMP, and several other federal government departments.

In 1991, Lockheed shut down its production lines in Burbank, California, for the P-3 Orion, which shares the same airframe with the CP-140. Three surplus airframes on hand were purchased by the Air Command, but delivered without the anti-submarine fit. These three aircraft were designated the CP-140A Arcturus and were used primarily for pilot training and coastal surface patrol missions.

=== Aurora Incremental Modernization Project ===
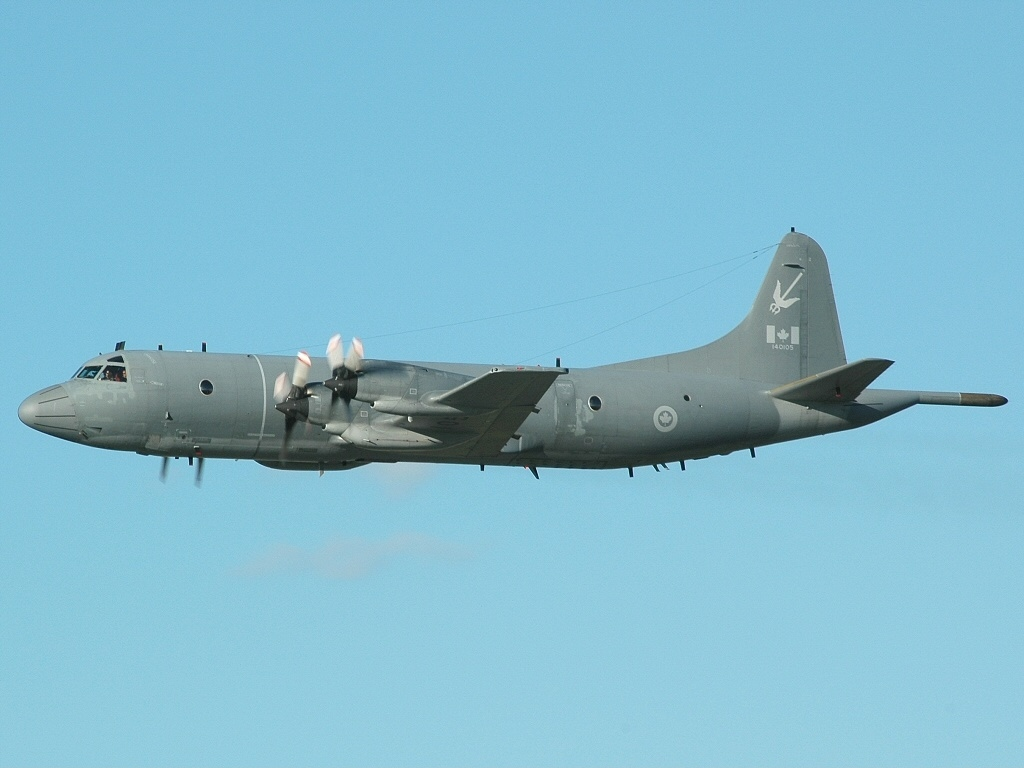
CP-140 Aurora 140105 departing from London International Airport near London, Ontario, in 2004

The Aurora Incremental Modernization Project (AIMP), initiated in 1998 to upgrade electronics of the Aurora fleet was halted by the government on 20 September 2007 to evaluate whether the aging fleet should continue to be upgraded or replaced by more modern aircraft. On 18 December 2007 the Department of National Defence rescinded this work suspension so that the project could continue. Work includes upgrading computer, navigation, communication and radar systems as well as making structural improvements to ten of eighteen aircraft. The intent of the modernization project is to "keep the aircraft safe and operationally viable until 2020".

AIMP is currently divided into four "blocks". Block I is complete and concentrated on the replacement of unsupportable systems. Block II brought a glass cockpit with the Navigation and Flight Instruments (NFI) component provided by CMC Electronics, and a complete replacement of the communications suite. Block III is a wholesale replacement of the aircraft's sensors and mission computer. Block IV consists of a large Wideband Global SATCOM radome on the upper fuselage, Directed Infrared Counter Measures system, Tactical Data Link 16 system, and a new anti-collision light on top of the vertical stabilizer. Block IV reached Full Operational Capability in the summer of 2024.

Once AIMP was completed the CP-140 was designated as CP-140M.

=== Aurora Structural Life Extension Program ===
The Aurora Structural Life Extension Project (ASLEP) is proceeding with 14 of the 18 Auroras scheduled to receive new wings and the replacement of key structural components. The complete ASLEP solution replaces the aircraft's outer wings, centre wing lower section and horizontal stabilizers with new production components. All fatigue-life limiting structures on the aircraft are replaced with enhanced-design components and improved corrosion-resistant materials that will greatly reduce maintenance costs over the aircraft's service life. This program is expected to extend the CP140s' service life by 15,000 flight hours per airframe, and the operational life of the fleet to about 2030.

== Operational history ==
=== CP-140 Aurora ===
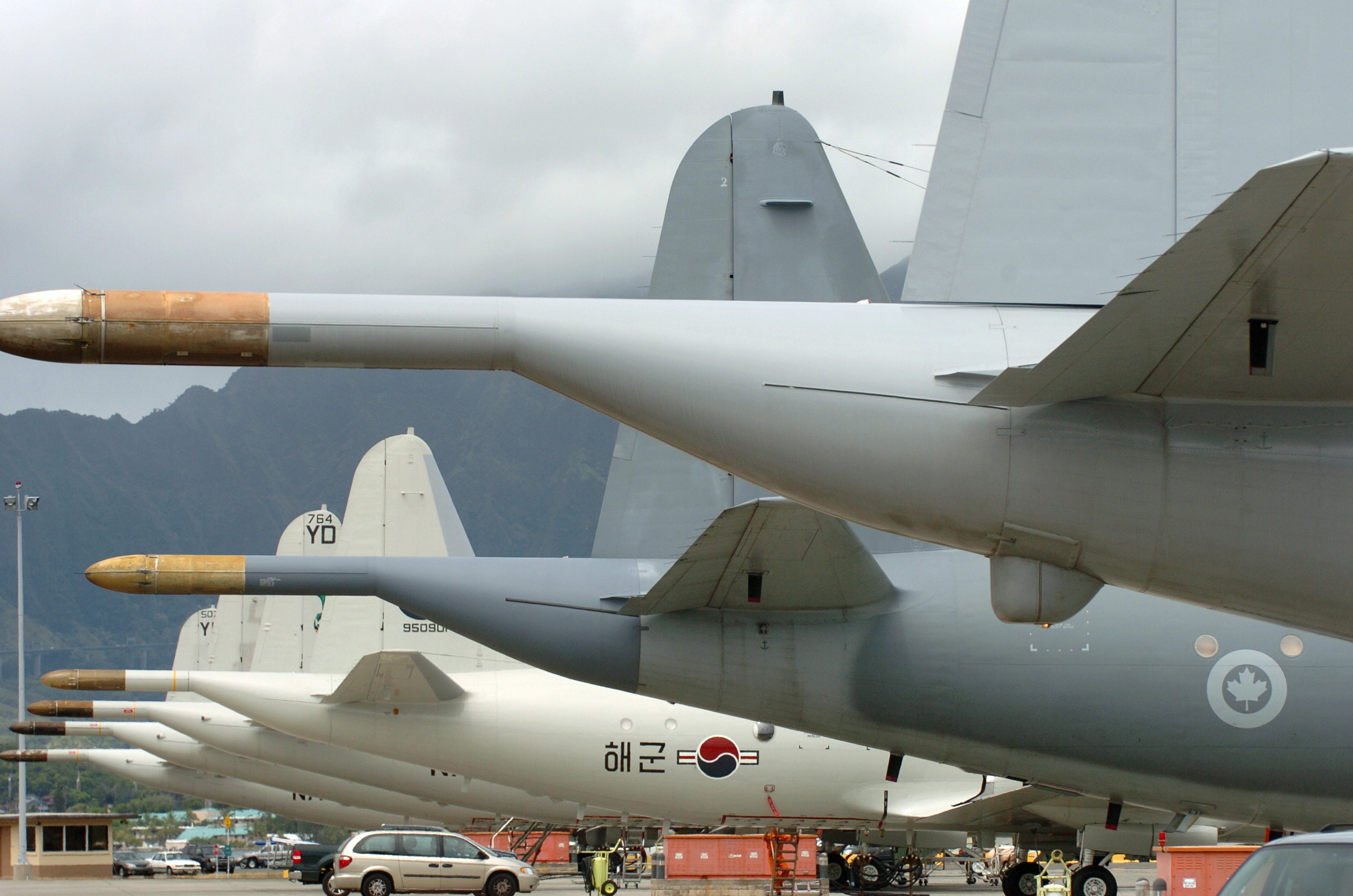
CP-140s and South Korean P-3s at Kaneohe Marine Corps Base in Hawaii

The Aurora was acquired in the early 1980s to replace the CP-107 Argus and to further support Canada's anti-submarine warfare mission obligations under NATO for the northwest Atlantic sector. Short deployments to Alaska (Adak), Hawaii (Kaneohe Bay), Iceland (Keflavik), the UK (St Mawgan and Kinloss), and Norway (Andoya) were the norm. However, since the end of the Cold War, they have been used primarily in coastal surveillance and sovereignty patrols by providing an all-weather mission surveillance platform. Increasingly, as the CP-140 moves into the 21st century, it is employed for domestic and international surveillance by CANCOM for security, counter-terrorism and smuggling, as well as to monitor foreign fishing fleets off Canada's coasts. CP-140s have also been deployed on operations such as Operation Assistance and Operation Apollo.

Deployments have included OP SHARPGUARD (Yugoslavia blockade), OP SIRIUS (Mediterranean Patrols), OP APOLLO (Persian Gulf region), and counter-narcotics patrols in the Gulf of Mexico and Pacific. Through all this, patrols of the Canadian Arctic continue to take advantage of the airframe's unique abilities.

In 2011 and 2012, CP-140 aircraft performed maritime patrol missions in the Libyan waters to help in the enforcement of the no-fly zone over Libya under Operation Odyssey Dawn and Operation Unified Protector.

As of January 2017, two CP-140s were conducting overland surveillance missions against ISIL as part of Operation Impact. However one aircraft was withdrawn in May 2017.

From October 2018, due to support the implementation of United Nations Security Council sanctions imposed against North Korea, Canadian Armed Forces deploy periodically a Canadian frigate and/or a CP-140 Aurora on Operation Neon. In June 2022 it was reported that Chinese jets had repeatedly intercepted the Aurora in a manner which the Canada military said failed to adhere to international air safety norms. Some of these intercepts forced the Aurora to change its flight path to avoid collision with the intercepting aircraft. Canadian government officials said the incidents were happening with increasing frequency and that they had lodged protests on multiple occasions with their Chinese counterparts, although an article by Global News said that China is not believed to have responded to the reprimands as the interceptions had not stopped continuing. On October 16, 2023, during a Canadian reconnaissance flight over international waters as part of a United Nations resolution to stop illegal oil shipments to North Korea, Chinese fighter jets intercepted the Aurora for multiple hours over the course of the Aurora's flight. One of the fighter jets behaved in an "aggressive manner" by flying back and forth in close proximity and flying with the Canadian plane within its blind spot, and firing off flares from near the front of the plane.

In February 2023, as a result of recent violence and unrest, a CP-140 was deployed to Haiti to help "disrupt the activities of gangs" by providing surveillance and intelligence. Separately, a CP-140 collaborated with USAF F-22 Raptors to intercept and down an unidentified object over Yukon Territory.

=== CP-140A Arcturus ===
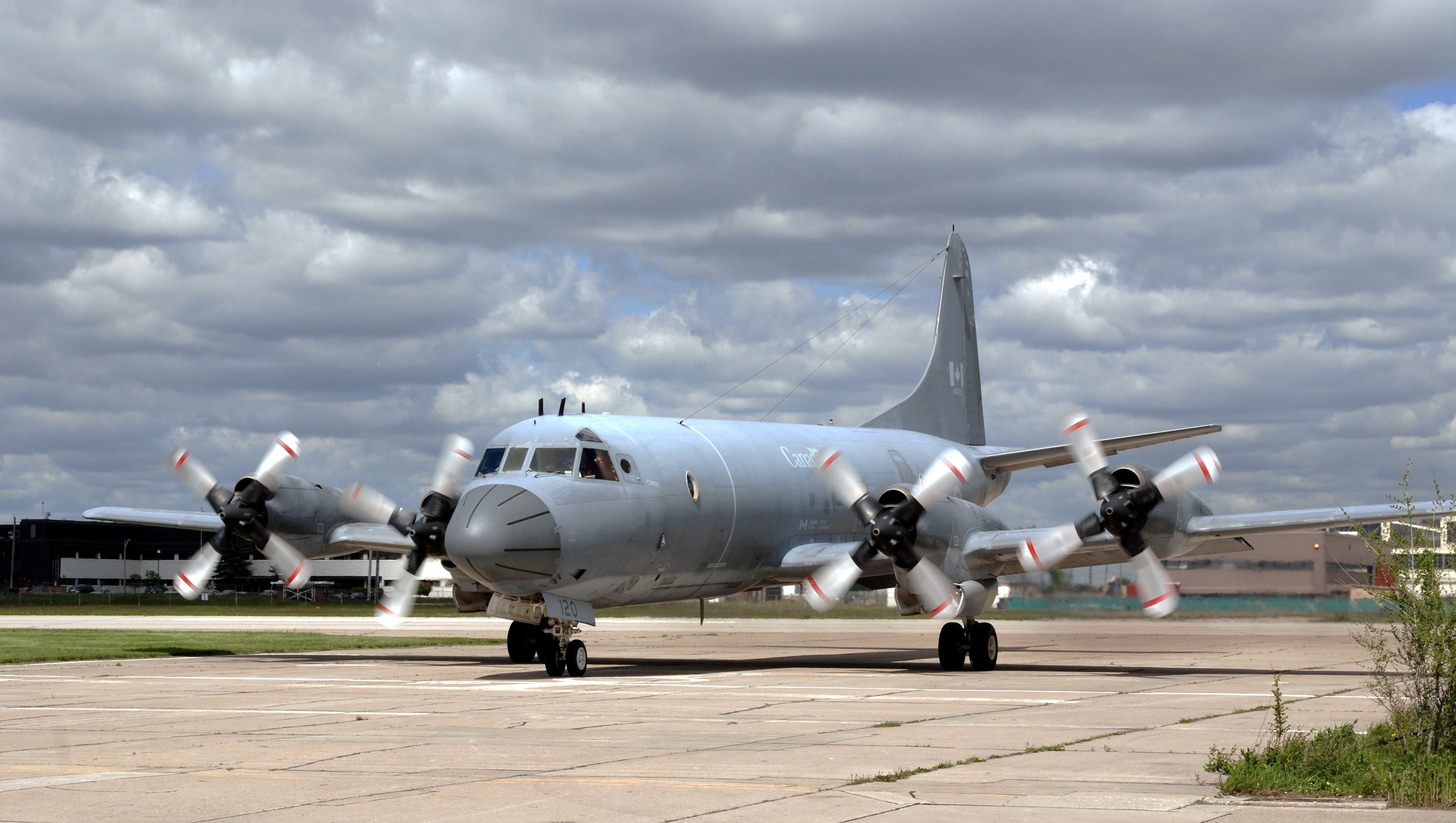
A CP-140A Arcturus 140120 at Downsview Airport in Toronto, Ontario, Canada in 2008

Lacking the expensive, heavy and sensitive anti-submarine warfare as well as the anti-surface warfare fittings of the CP-140 Aurora, the Arcturus was more fuel efficient and was used for crew training duties (such as touch-and-go landing practice), general maritime surface reconnaissance (detecting drug operations, smuggling of illegal immigrants, fisheries protection patrols, pollution monitoring, etc.), search-and-rescue assistance and Arctic sovereignty patrols. The Arcturus did possess a superior AN/APS-507 surface search radar, incorporating modern functions such as track-while-scan that the Aurora's AN/APS-506 radar lacks but the Arcturus did not have an integrated mission computer, or mission systems. It did, however, maintain the same military communications suite as the CP-140 Aurora.

All three aircraft were based at 14 Wing. Upon retirement from flying operations, one was used for technician training with 404 Long Range Patrol and Training Squadron on base CFB Greenwood, Nova Scotia, before being moved to the Greenwood Military Aviation Museum on base. The last two of the CP-140As were retired in 2011 when they were delivered to the Aerospace Maintenance and Regeneration Group (AMARG) in Tucson, Arizona.

=== Replacement ===
Several options had been suggested for a CP-140M replacement. These included the Boeing P-8 Poseidon and the Raytheon Sentinel, based on the Bombardier Global Express-6500, as well as late entrant PAL Aerospace Global Express 6500-based P-6.

The RCAF had planned to downsize the fleet from eighteen to fourteen aircraft, with three already being withdrawn and a fourth test aircraft to be retired in the near future. The retirement of the CP-140 was originally expected around 2030, and could have resulted in a capability gap as the RCAF did not anticipate replacements to be delivered until 2032 to 2038. The RCAF's Weapon System Manager (WSM) had prepared plans to have the CP-140M operational until 2035 to 2040.

On March 28, 2023, the Government of Canada sent a Letter of Request to the US's Foreign Military Sales program to approve the purchase sixteen P-8A to replace the current CP-140 fleet, but it did not indicate any timeline for delivery. On June 27, 2023, the US Congress approved the LOR for Canada to acquire the P-8.

On November 30, 2023, Minister of National Defence Bill Blair announced the acquisition of sixteen P-8A Poseidon aircraft for the Royal Canadian Air Force. This acquisition is initially set for fourteen aircraft, with an option of two additional aircraft. It is anticipated by the Department of National Defence that the first aircraft will be delivered in 2026, all 14 aircraft to be delivered by the fall of 2027, with full operational capacity by 2033.

The decision to proceed with a sole-source purchase of the Boeing aircraft was seen as a significant win for US as the Canadian government was under pressure to pick the US aircraft. David Cohen, the US ambassador to Canada, had sent a letter to cabinet ministers, including then Treasury Board president Anita Anand, urging them to move ahead with the sole-source deal purchase.

Four Aurora were declared surplus and retired between 2023 and 2025. The four will be broken up in Nova Scotia and trucked to an aircraft retirement facility in Quebec.

Assembly of the first CP-8 fuselage began in February 2026, with delivery now expected to start from 2027.

== Operators ==
Canada

- Royal Canadian Air Force
  - 404 Long Range Patrol and Training Squadron, CFB Greenwood, Nova Scotia
    - 4 × CP-140M Aurora
  - 405 Long Range Patrol Squadron, CFB Greenwood, Nova Scotia
    - 11 × CP-140M Aurora and 1 × CP-140 Aurora to be retained as a test aircraft until retirement in the near future.
  - 415 Long Range Patrol Force Development Squadron, CFB Greenwood, Nova Scotia
  - 407 Long Range Patrol Squadron, CFB Comox, British Columbia
    - 3 × CP-140M Aurora

== Aircraft on display ==
- CP-140102 National Air Force Museum of Canada.
- CP-140107 Comox Air Force Museum.
- CP-140119 Greenwood Military Aviation Museum (This airframe is the sole CP-140A Arcturus on display).

== Specifications (CP-140) ==
Data from Jane's All the World's Aircraft 1981-82

General characteristics

- Crew: Mission minimum 8, typically 12 to 15
- Length: 116 ft 10 in (35.61 m)
- Wingspan: 99 ft 8 in (30.38 m)
- Height: 33 ft 8.5 in (10.274 m)
- Wing area: 1,300 sq ft (120 m^{2})
- Aspect ratio: 7.5
- Airfoil: root: NACA 0014 (modified); tip: NACA 0012 (modified)
- Gross weight: 61,362 lb (27,833 kg)
- Fuel capacity: 7,661 imp gal (9,200 US gal; 34,828 L) usable fuel in one fuselage tank and four wing integral tanks
- Powerplant: 4 × Allison T56-A-14-LFE turboprop engines, 4,909 hp (3,661 kW) each
- Propellers: 4-bladed Hamilton Standard 54H60, 13 ft 6 in (4.11 m) diameter constant-speed fully-feathering reversible-pitch propellers

Performance

- Maximum speed: 375 kn (432 mph, 694 km/h) below cruise ceiling
- Maximum transit speed: 395 kn (455 mph; 732 km/h) at optimum altitude
- Range: 5,000 nmi (5,800 mi, 9,300 km)
- Endurance: 8 hours 12 minutes on station at 1,000 nmi (1,151 mi; 1,852 km) radius
- Service ceiling: 35,100 ft (10,700 m)
- FAR balanced field length: 7,900 ft (2,408 m)
- Take-off distance to 50 ft (15 m): 6,000 ft (1,829 m)
- Landing distance from 50 ft (15 m): 3,200 ft (975 m) at 114,000 lb (51,710 kg) landing weight

Armament

- Hardpoints: 8 in weapons bay; 10 under-wing from 611 to 2,450 lb (277 to 1,111 kg) capacity with a capacity of 4,800 lb (2,177 kg) total in weapons bay, with provisions to carry combinations of:
  - Other: signal chargers, smoke markers, illumination flares
- Rockets: air-to-surface rockets can be fitted after a minor retrofit.
- Bombs: Mk 46 Mod V torpedoes, conventional bombs

Avionics

- Univac AN/AYK-502 nav/attack computer
- Digital magnetic tape units and video recorders
- AN/APS-116 search radar
- OR-5004/AA (modified) FLIR
- AN/ASN505 dual INS
- AN/APN-510 Doppler
- AN/ARN-511 Omega nav system
- HF/UHF/VHF comms
- Airways nav aids
- AN/ASW-502 AFCS
- AN/ASQ-502 MAD
- KA-501A day/night camera with night illuminator
- Sonobuoys
- Wescam MX-20 Electro-Optical/Infrared (EO/IR) suite
- Electronic Support Measures (ESM)
- Applanix DSS-439 Digital Mapping Camera (DSS)
- hand-held digital camera
- gyro-stabilized binoculars
- 3 AN/ARC-210 V/UHF Radios
- 1 AN/ARC-234 V/UHF SATCOM Radio.

== See also ==
Related development

- Lockheed L-188 Electra
- Lockheed P-3 Orion

Aircraft of comparable role, configuration, and era

- Avro Shackleton
- Breguet Atlantique
- Canadair CP-107 Argus
- Hawker-Siddeley Nimrod
- Ilyushin Il-38
- Tupolev Tu-95

Related lists

- List of active Canadian military aircraft
- List of Lockheed aircraft
