= 418 Search and Rescue Operational Training Squadron =

- Squadron badge
- Active: 1941–1945; 1946–1994; 2019–present
- Country: Canada
- Branch: Royal Canadian Air Force
- Type: 1941–1945 Intruder; 1946–1994 Tactical bomber/transport; 2019–present Search and rescue/transport
- Part of: 1941–1945 RCAF Article XV squadrons, attached to the RAF for operational purposes; 2019–present 19 Wing Comox
- Headquarters: CFB Comox
- Motto(s): Piyautailili (Inuktitut for 'Defend even unto death')
- Battle honours: Defence of Britain, 1944; Fortress Europe, 1942–1944; Dieppe; France and Germany, 1944–1945; Normandy, 1944; Rhine

418 Search and Rescue Operational Training Squadron is a unit of the Royal Canadian Air Force, formed during World War II.

== History ==
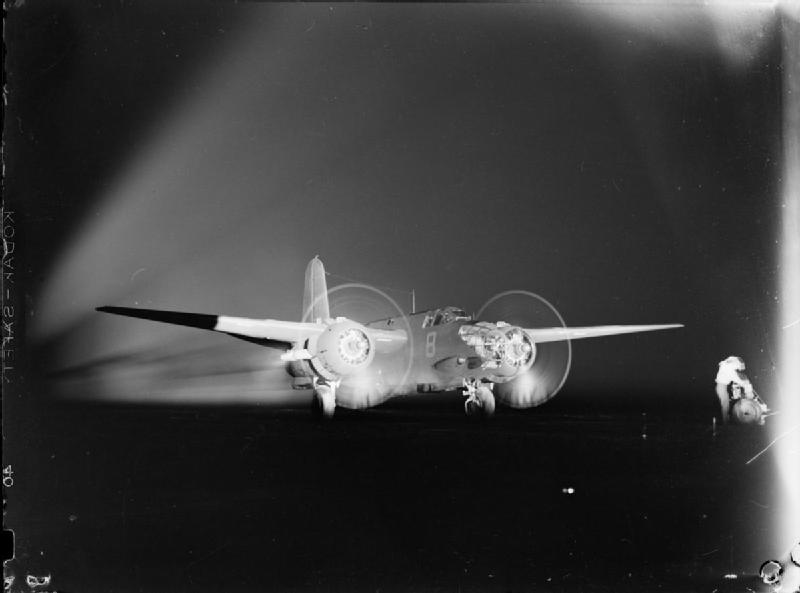
418 Squadron Douglas Boston Mark III (Intruder) at RAF Bradwell Bay, England, prepares to take off on a night intruder mission over North-west Europe

418 Squadron RCAF was Canada's highest-scoring squadron in World War II, in terms of both air-to-air and air-to-ground kills, and in terms of both day and night operations. The squadron's most active period was 1944, when assigned to intruder and ranger sorties across occupied Europe.

The squadron was re-formed in 1946 flying the B-25 Mitchell in the tactical bomber role from the Edmonton Municipal Airport. It moved to RCAF Station Namao in 1955. In 1958, 418 was redesignated as a light transport and search and rescue unit. Aircraft assigned included the de Havilland Canada DHC-3 Otter and Beechcraft C-45 Expeditor from RCAF Station Namao. Its duties ranged from aid to the civil power to aerial resupply.

Upon unification of the forces the squadron converted to the De Havilland Twin Otter. The squadron was disbanded in 1994, and its aircraft were shifted to 440 Transport Squadron in Yellowknife, Northwest Territories.

In 1985, 418 Squadron Association was formed, originally with the name 418 Squadron Foundation, as part of a De Havilland Mosquito aircraft restoration project. Since the restoration project, the 418 Squadron Association functions as a historical society that operates out of the Alberta Aviation Museum on Kingsway Avenue in Edmonton, where it has its own museum gallery, archives, and collection. From 2002 to 2011, 418 Squadron Association also collaborated with the Alberta Aviation Museum on a project to restore a North American B-25 Mitchell. Both aircraft are on display in the main gallery.

418 Squadron was re-formed on March 13, 2019, with Lieutenant-Colonel Jeffers as commanding officer. The unit is based at 19 Wing Comox, as 418 Search and Rescue Operational Training Squadron, training aircrew and maintenance personnel on the CC-295 Kingfisher, using simulators and aircraft.

== Aircraft operated ==
- Douglas Boston III
- de Havilland Mosquito Mk. II
- de Havilland Mosquito FB Mk VII
- North American Harvard Mk.II
- North American B-25 Mitchell
- Beechcraft C-45 Expeditor
- Lockheed T-33 Silver Star
- de Havilland Canada DHC-3 Otter
- de Havilland Canada DHC-6 Twin Otter
- Lockheed C-130 Hercules
- CC-295 Kingfisher
