= Waterville/Kings County Municipal Airport =

Former airport in Waterville, Nova Scotia

- IATA: none; ICAO: none

Summary
- Airport type: Public
- Operator: Waterville Airport Cooperative Ltd.
- Location: Waterville, Nova Scotia
- Time zone: AST (UTC−04:00)
  - Summer (DST): ADT (UTC−03:00)
- Elevation AMSL: 119 ft (36 m)
- Coordinates: 45°03′07″N 064°39′06″W
- Website: http://www.watervilleairport.com

Map
- Location in Nova Scotia

Runways
| Direction | Length | | Surface |
| Direction | ft | m | Surface |
|---|---|---|---|
| 09/27 | 3,498 | 1,066 | Asphalt |

Statistics (2006)
- Aircraft movements: 6,102
- Source: Canada Flight Supplement; Movements from Statistics Canada

Waterville/Kings County Municipal Airport, formerly TC LID: CCW3, was located adjacent to Waterville, Nova Scotia, Canada.

== Users ==
The airport was home to a variety of commercial, public and recreational users including the company GFC Aircraft Maintenance, the Annapolis Valley Flying Club, the Atlantic School of Skydiving and the Valley Search and Rescue organization.

== History ==
The airport was built in 1943 as an emergency airstrip for the air force base at Greenwood. It was sold in 1945 to private owners. A variety of private operators ran the airport until 1976 when it was purchased by the Municipality of Kings County.

== Closure ==
In March 2014, Kings County councillors voted to close the airport on 30 September in order to permit possible expansion of the Michelin tire factory immediately to the south of the runway. Michelin has not confirmed any expansion, but had previously stated that due to the "layout and location of its equipment" the only possible direction to expand would be the airport site. County Warden Diana Brothers stated the pre-emptive action served to avoid "[stifling] a chance for economic growth." and that "If we wait to move the airport first, which could be one or two years down the road, we may miss an opportunity with Michelin."

Warden Brothers also stated that provision of a new civilian airport for local aviators and aviation businesses might be made "so long as there is a positive business case to support relocating it". The airport was officially closed 1 April 2016 and aircraft at the CCW3 were moved to CFB Greenwood, the Hillaton/Kings Airport, Stanley Airport and Halifax Airport.

Negotiations between the Canadian DND and Kings County have led to an agreement to allow civil aviation operations at CFB Greenwood. A 25-year lease is to be signed, after which there will be hangars built to house civilian aircraft based there. Operations at CFB Greenwood are managed by Freedom Aviation.
