= Allan Bundy =

Canadian combat pilot (1920–2001)

- Born: 1920; Dartmouth, Nova Scotia, Canada
- Died: 9 December 2001 (aged 80–81); Toronto, Ontario, Canada
- Education: Dalhousie University
- Spouse: Marie Della Kane (m. 1942)
- Military career
- Allegiance: Canada
- Branch: RCAF
- Unit: 404 Squadron
- Known for: First Black Canadian combat pilot
- Conflicts: World War II
- Other work: Manufacturing supervisor

Allan Selwyn Bundy (1920 – 9 December 2001) was the first Black Canadian combat pilot. Born in Dartmouth, Nova Scotia, Bundy was a talented athlete who excelled in track and field. He attended Dalhousie University to study chemistry as a scholarship student. When the Second World War began he applied to join the Royal Canadian Air Force (RCAF) but was rejected due to his race. In 1942 he received a notice of conscription from the Canadian Army, which he did not accept; he informed the Royal Canadian Mounted Police, when they arrived to follow up on the notice, that he wanted to serve in the RCAF. He was accepted and trained as a Flying Officer, an occasion which received media attention from as far away as Pittsburgh.

Bundy was posted to Britain with the 404 Squadron in 1943. Partnered with Sergeant Elwood Cecil Wright, he flew Bristol Beaufighters and the de Havilland Mosquito in coastal defence. The pair conducted at least 42 missions beginning in October 1944, when they sank two ships off Norway.

After the war, Bundy worked in Toronto as a manufacturing supervisor.
