= CFB Comox =

Royal Canadian Air Force Base and Airport in British Columbia

CFB Comox Comox Airport (YQQ)

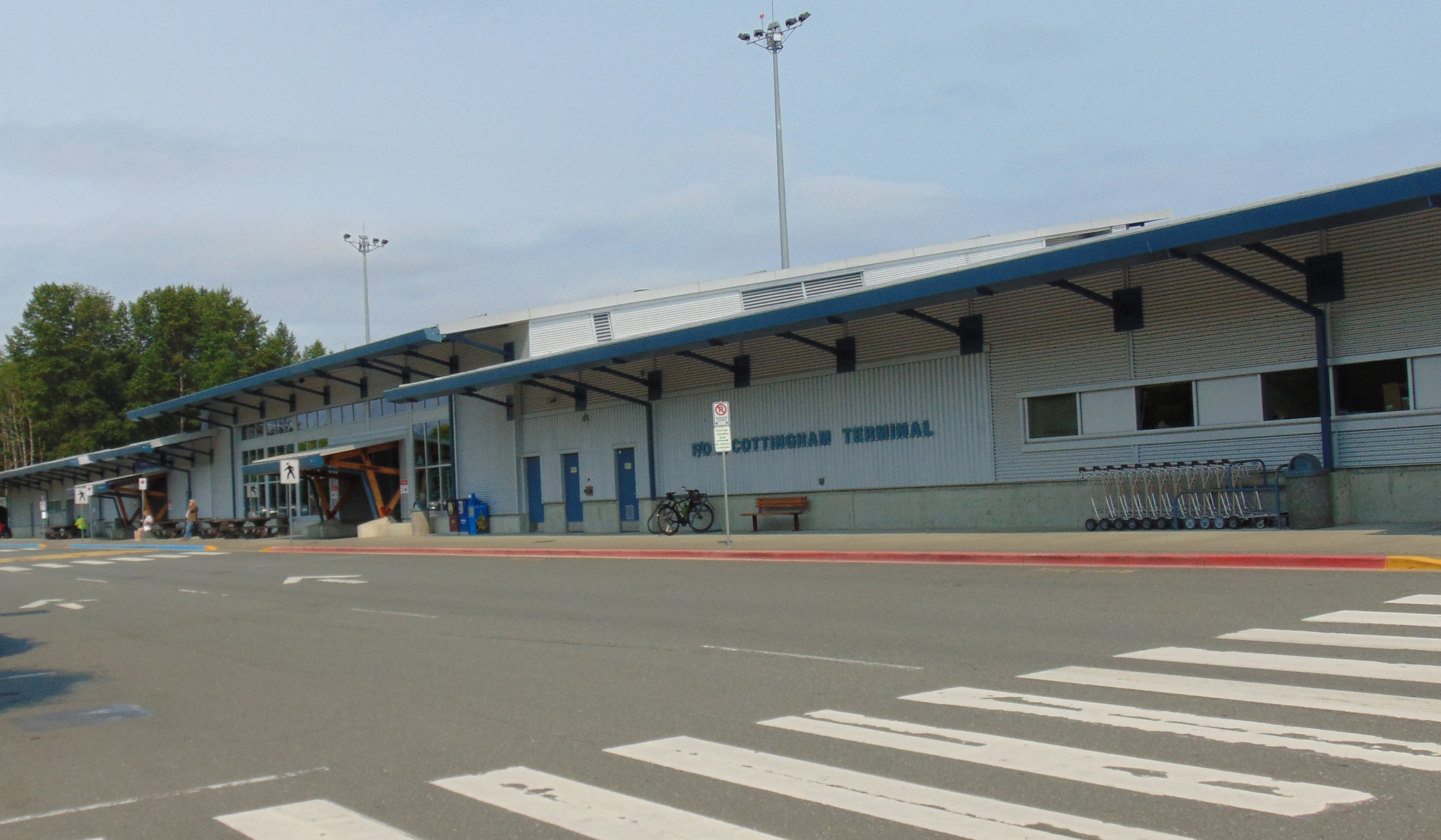
- Front of the airport terminal building
- IATA: YQQ; ICAO: CYQQ; WMO: 71893 p

Summary
- Airport type: Military / public
- Owner: Government of Canada
- Operator: DND / Comox Valley Airport Commission^{A}
- Location: Comox, British Columbia
- Commander: Col. Ian Perreault
- Time zone: PST (UTC−08:00)
  - Summer (DST): PDT (UTC−07:00)
- Elevation AMSL: 84 ft (26 m)
- Coordinates: 49°42′39″N 124°53′12″W
- Website: CFB 19 Wing Comox www.comoxairport.com

Map
- Location in British Columbia CYQQ (Canada)

Runways
Direction	Length		Surface
Direction	ft	m	Surface
12/30	10,001	3,048	Concrete
18/36	4,998	1,523	Asphalt

Helipads
Number	Length		Surface
Number	ft	m	Surface
1	100 x 100	30 × 30	Asphalt
2	100 x 100	30 × 30	Asphalt
3	100 x 100	30 × 30	Concrete

Statistics (2010)
- Aircraft movements: 20,244
- Source: Canada Flight Supplement; Environment and Climate Change Canada; Movements from Statistics Canada. and Transport Canada; AAirport terminal only

Canadian Forces Base Comox (IATA: YQQ, ICAO: CYQQ), commonly referred to as CFB Comox or 19 Wing, is a Canadian Forces base on Vancouver Island in the Comox Valley, 2.5 nautical miles (4.6 km; 2.9 mi) north northeast of Comox, British Columbia. It is primarily operated as an air force base by the Royal Canadian Air Force (RCAF) and is one of two bases in the country using the CP-140 Aurora anti-submarine / maritime patrol and surveillance aircraft, the other being CFB Greenwood. Its primary RCAF lodger unit is 19 Wing, commonly referred to as 19 Wing Comox.

CFB Comox's airfield is also used by civilian aircraft. The civilian passenger terminal building operations are called the Comox Valley Airport and are operated by the Comox Valley Airport Commission.

The airport is classified as an airport of entry by Nav Canada, can handle general aviation aircraft with up to 15 passengers, and is staffed by the Canada Border Services Agency (CBSA).

== History ==
=== Military air base operations ===
The Royal Air Force (RAF) constructed the airfield at the strategic location of Comox in spring 1942. RAF Station Comox was built to guard against any possible threat from the Imperial Japanese Navy to North America.

In approximately 1942, the aerodrome was listed as RCAF Aerodrome - Comox, British Columbia at 49°43′N 124°54′W with no listed variation or elevation. The aerodrome was listed as "Under construction - Serviceable" with two runways as follows:

Direction	Length		Surface
Direction	Feet	Meters	Surface
12/30	10,000	3,000	Concrete
18/36	5,000	1,500	Asphalt

In 1943, the RCAF took over control of the airfield, renaming the facility RCAF Station Comox. The RCAF used Comox for training crews of transport aircraft for the rest of World War II, basing a training squadron flying the Douglas Dakota in 1944.

From 1946 until 1952, the base was mothballed until tensions resulting from the Korean War and Cold War prompted reactivation and the establishment of a permanent RCAF base on Canada's Pacific coast.

The 407 Long Range Patrol Squadron initially used the Avro Lancaster then Lockheed P2V-7 Neptune, followed by the Canadair CP-107 Argus and now the Lockheed CP-140 Aurora.

The 409 Tactical Fighter Squadron was equipped with the Lockheed T-33 and Avro Canada CF-100 Canuck, followed by the McDonnell CF-101 Voodoo, an example of which can be found on display at the main entrance of 19 Wing.

In 1954, Comox became home to a Pinetree Line radar early-warning station, operated by the 51 Aircraft Control and Warning Squadron (radar). This facility was closed in June 1958 with the advent of more advanced radar systems such as the Mid-Canada Line and the Distant Early Warning Line (DEW Line).

In 1964, RCAF Station Sea Island near Vancouver International Airport was closed and turned over to the Canadian Coast Guard. Sea Island's 121 Composite Unit moved to Comox and was reorganized as 442 Transport and Rescue Squadron, flying the Grumman HU-16 Albatross fixed-wing and Piasecki H-21 helicopter, later re-equipping with the CH-113 Labrador and de Havilland Canada DHC-5 Buffalo. The Labrador helicopter was replaced with the AgustaWestland CH-149 Cormorant starting in 2001.

On February 1, 1968, the RCAF merged with the Royal Canadian Navy (RCN) and Canadian Army to form the unified Canadian Armed Forces. RCAF Station Comox was renamed Canadian Forces Base Comox, shortened to CFB Comox. During a 1975 reorganization of the Canadian Forces, Air Command (AIRCOM) was created to operate the air element.

After CFB Comox began sharing the airport with scheduled airlines and other civilian aircraft, a Boeing 747 flown by Northwest Airlines became the first jumbo jet to operate into the field when it made an emergency landing there on June 5, 1979. The flight, chartered by the U.S. military to transport 368 active duty personnel and their families from Travis Air Force Base to Japan and South Korea, was over Cape Scott following an intermediate stop at Seattle–Tacoma International Airport when fire broke out in one of the aircraft's engines. Efforts to extinguish the flames were unsuccessful; the crew declared an emergency and requested permission to land on the 10,000 ft (3,000 m) runway at CFB Comox. Though no flames were visible, the fire warning light was still flashing in the cockpit as the plane landed. There were no injuries to the passengers or to the 13 crew members. Base officials, practised at hosting large numbers of Canadian Forces personnel, ensured that the plane's occupants were comfortable while awaiting a new aircraft to carry them to their destinations.

In 1980, 407 Squadron began re-equipping with the Lockheed CP-140 Aurora. In 1984, 409 Squadron moved from CFB Comox to CFB Cold Lake leaving the base with the duties of coastal patrol, anti-submarine and transport missions, and search and rescue (SAR) missions.

In 1989, a strike force of United States Air Force deployed Boeing KC-135 Stratotankers from the Washington Air National Guard to CFB Comox as part of the annual Global Shield Exercise. The deployment, which included vehicles, equipment and armed personnel arriving by landing craft at a local beach, prompted some locals to ask whether the United States was invading Canada.

=== Commercial airline service ===
During the late 1950s, Pacific Western Airlines served the airfield with nonstop and one-stop direct flights to Vancouver operated with Douglas DC-3 aircraft with the one-stop service being flown via Campbell River, British Columbia. By the early 1960s, the airline had expanded their DC-3 service with nonstop flights to Port Hardy as well. Pacific Western then introduced turboprop service with the Convair 640 (which the airline called the "Javelin Jet-Prop") while continuing to operate nonstop flights to Vancouver, Port Hardy, and Campbell River during the late 1960s. The airline then began operating jet service into the airfield with the Boeing 737 and in 1975 was operating two nonstop 737 flights a day to Vancouver. Pacific Western would continue to serve Comox with Boeing 737-200 jet flights through the mid-1980s by which time the air carrier had become an all-jet airline. By 1995, the airfield no longer had jet service with flights to Vancouver being operated by either Air BC flying Air Canada Connector codeshare service with De Havilland Canada Dash 8 turboprops or by Time Air operating Canadian Airlines Partner codeshare service with Dash 8 and Short 360 turboprops. According to the Official Airline Guide (OAG), Air BC and Time Air were operating a combined total of ten round trip nonstop flights on weekdays between Comox and Vancouver at this time.

In 2003, the public airport terminal received a complete renovation, increasing the flow of people through the terminal by an average of nearly 400 people per day, as well as building a customs area. In the early 2000s Air Transat and Sunwing Airlines were flying to Mexico during the winter months, but discontinued service about a decade ago.

In April 2012, a Boeing 777 operated by Korean Air made an emergency landing at Comox after the airline received a bomb threat. The flight was diverted to the airbase at escorted by F-15 Eagle fighter jets from the US Air Force that had been scrambled from Portland, Oregon. Korean Air Flight 72, with 149 people on board, had taken off from Vancouver International Airport headed for Seoul, South Korea, at 2:30 p.m. PT Tuesday. The crew turned back off the north coast of B.C. after a bomb threat was made in a telephone call. it was one of the largest passenger airliners to fly into Comox.

=== Military use ===
CFB Comox is the RCAF's primary air defence installation on Canada's Pacific coast and serves as the home base for maritime patrol / anti-submarine aircraft and search and rescue (SAR) aircraft, both fixed-wing and rotary-wing .

Its primary lodger unit, 19 Wing, has the following operational squadrons:

- 407 Long Range Patrol Squadron flying the Lockheed CP-140 Aurora
- 442 Transport and Rescue Squadron flying the CC-295 Kingfisher fixed-wing aircraft and AgustaWestland CH-149 Cormorant rotary-wing aircraft
- 418 Search and Rescue Operational Training Squadron flying the CC-295 Kingfisher.

19 Wing also includes the 19 Air Maintenance Squadron, and a number of other organizations.

CFB Comox is the location of the Canadian Forces School of Search and Rescue, where all para-rescue specialists in the Canadian Forces, known as Search And Rescue Technicians or "SAR Techs", undergo training.

CFB Comox serves as a forward operating base for temporary deployments of the McDonnell Douglas CF-18 Hornet fighter-interceptor.

Every April, the Snowbirds practice at 19 Wing Comox.

CFB Comox is used by the Royal Canadian Air Cadets for glider and powered flight training, training glider pilots on Schweizer SGS 2-33A's and housing the cadets training on Cessna 182's respectively in the summer months. Training for the Advanced Aviation Air Cadet Course is also hosted at CFB Comox. An annex of CFB Comox, Annex A "Goose Spit", is used by the Royal Canadian Sea Cadets for CTC HMCS Quadra where 600 sea cadets undergo training in the basic trades of music (combined with Army and Air cadets), gunnery, boatswain, and sail. It also trains cadets in three specialty trades; marine engineering, shipwright, and Silver Sail. The annex is also host to the local Canadian Forces Sail Association.

CFB Comox is planned to be one of the two Canadian bases operating armed drones in the late 2020s, the other being CFB Greenwood in Nova Scotia.

=== Civilian use ===
CFB Comox shares the airfield with a civilian terminal for commercial flights; WestJet and Pacific Coastal Airlines have been serving the airport since 2000, Air Canada has been serving the airport off and on from 2000-2008 then from 2015 to present. Flair Airlines started service in 2022.

The base hosts a biennial air show (although not held from 2005 to 2012, or 2015 to 2024) to celebrate Canadian Forces Day.

The base is also home to the Comox Air Force Museum which features several aircraft and other historical exhibits.

The base is a primary employer in the Comox Valley.

== Comox Airport (YQQ) ==
=== Facilities ===
The Comox Airport has a number of facilities available. Two major businesses are located in the airport terminal: On the Fly Café and Compass Gallery + Gifts. There is also a bike repair station on-site, as well as an EVOLVE e-bike rental stand.

The airport has its own fuel service, Shell Aviation Canada, and provides jet fuel (Jet A1) and Jet A1 fuel with FSII.

The airport has a CANPASS Customs area for international arrivals.

There are three car rental agencies at Comox: Budget, Enterprise and National Car Rental

=== Terminal ===
The airport has a 3,300 m^{2} (36,000 ft^{2}) terminal with 93 m^{2} (1,000 ft^{2}) for retail, the airport has 6 aircraft parking spots and 300 on site parking and 140 overflow parking areas. The airports hold room can seat about 200 people. There are two baggage carousels for arrivals.

== COVID-19 pandemic ==
Throughout the COVID-19 pandemic, passenger service dipped to a few flights per week, with Pacific Coastal Airlines and Air Canada pulling service temporarily from the airport, and WestJet pulling service from Edmonton and Vancouver, WestJet reduced flights to Calgary to one flight every couple of days. Passenger numbers for the Comox Airport plunged in 2020 as a direct result of the pandemic. In 2019 the airport had more than 400,000 passengers, and in 2020 it was under 200,000 passengers. WestJet announced new routes from the airport for the summer of 2021, from Comox to Toronto, and WestJet link service to Vancouver. Air Canada has resumed its service to Vancouver.

== Fall 2021 and beyond ==
In October 2021, Flair Airlines announced that they would be starting flights from Comox to Calgary and Edmonton starting late March 2022. It was unclear if WestJet plans on resuming service to Puerto Vallarta for the winter season of 2021-2022, due to uncertainly around COVID-19 and the travel restrictions in Canada.

On November 15, 2021, Swoop Airlines announced that they will commence three times weekly service from Edmonton, using their fleet of Boeing 737 Next Generation (737-800) aircraft, on Thursday, June 9, 2022. "Swoop's arrival will generate a lot of excitement for travellers looking for affordable options to reconnect with their friends and family," said Mike Atkins, Comox Valley Airport's CEO. "We are delighted to have Swoop support travel to the Comox Valley, particularly for our tourism partners ready to welcome visitors to the spectacular region we serve."

On November 18, 2021, 22 people were injured in an explosion at the barracks at CFB Comox. Sixteen military members and six civilians were injured on Thursday after an explosion took place at a barracks building that was undergoing renovations. 59 people were housed in the building, though not everyone was inside of the building at the time of the blast.

During the 2021 Pacific Northwest floods in B.C., members from CFB Comox assisted in rescuing people stranded after flooding and mudslides washed out multiple sections of Highway 7 near Agassiz. In the 48 hours leading up to the CAF request for assistance, the Royal Canadian Air Force dispatched three Cormorant helicopters from 442 Transport and Rescue Squadron to airlift more than 300 people, 26 dogs and one cat to safety.

== Airlines and destinations ==
Airlines	Destinations
Air Canada Express	Vancouver
Pacific Coastal Airlines	Kelowna, Vancouver
WestJet	Calgary; Seasonal: Edmonton, Puerto Vallarta, Toronto–Pearson
WestJet Encore	Edmonton, Vancouver; Seasonal: Calgary

AirSprint and Summit Air also provide charter services from Comox.

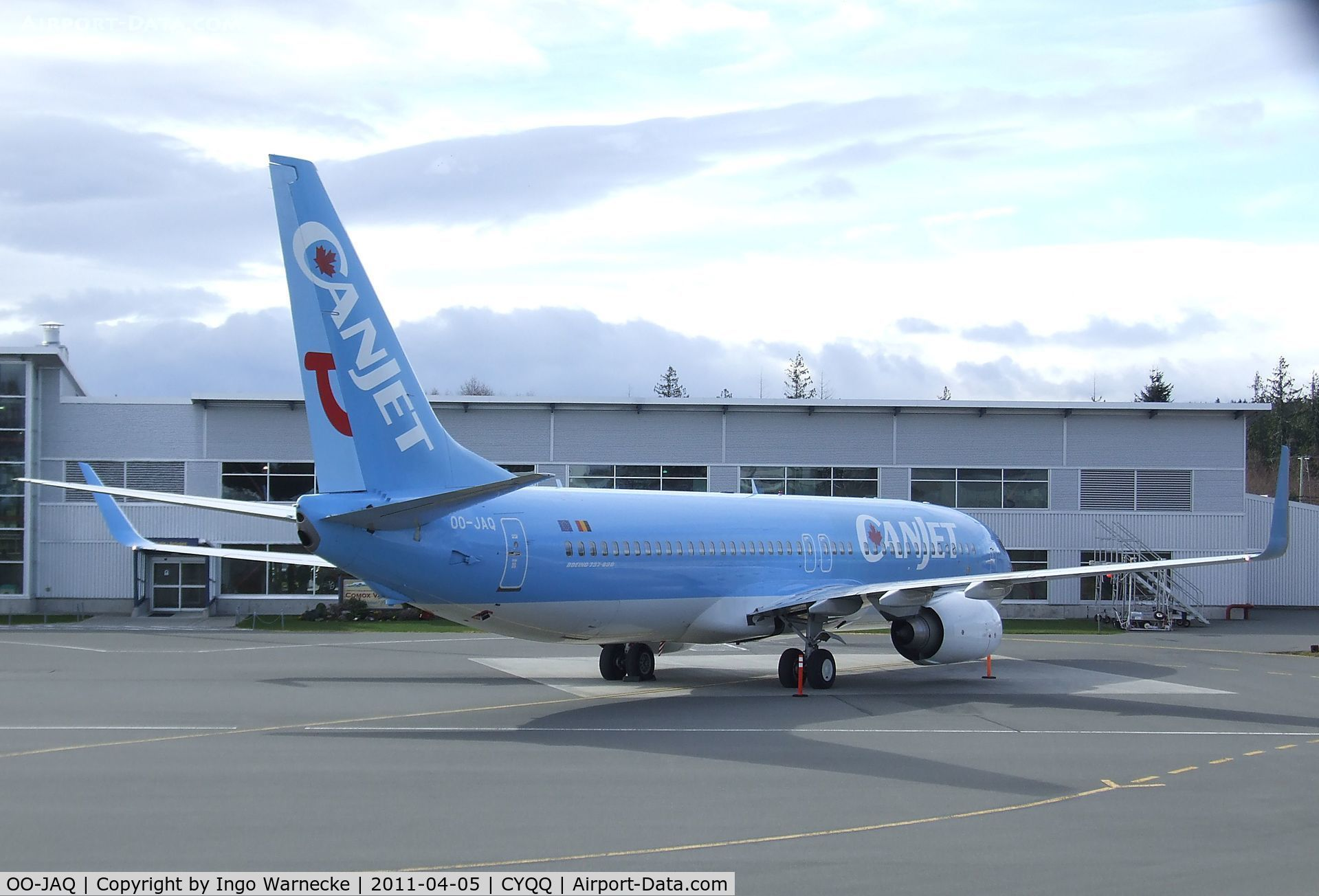
CanJet aircraft at Comox Airport in 2009

== Passenger numbers for Comox Airport ==
Year	Passenger numbers	% Change
2005	209,668	-
2006	238,612	▲13.8%
2007	310,450	▲30.1%
2008	304,069	▼2.1%
2009	289,978	▼4.8%
2010	296,567	▲2.3%
2011	308,937	▲4.2%
2012	327,827	▲6.1%
2013	313,186	▼4.4%
2014	318,830	▲1.8%
2015	350,895	▲10.1%
2016	368,733	▲5.1%
2017	369,161	▲0.1%
2018	420,811	▲14%
2019	412,597	▼2%
2020	127,633	▼69%
2021	155,064	▲21%
2022	323,429	▲108%
2023	385,651	▲19%

== Education ==
Child dependents of the CFB Comox area are assigned to Airport Elementary School, which is owned and maintained by School District 71 Comox Valley; the school is in the Lazo area of Comox. It was originally named Comox Airport School, then a facility under the ownership of the Department of National Defence, although District 71 provided the teachers. The school began operations in 1954. Residents zoned to Airport Elementary are zoned to Highland Secondary School in Comox.

== See also ==
- List of airports on Vancouver Island
- Comox Water Aerodrome
