= 405 Long Range Patrol Squadron =

- Active: April 1941 – September 1945; April 1947–present
- Country: Canada
- Branch: (Canada) Royal Canadian Air Force
- Role: Long Range Maritime Patrol
- Based at: CFB Greenwood, Gransden Lodge Airfield
- Motto: Ducimus ("We Lead")
- Battle honours: Fortress Europe 1941–44; France & Germany Biscay Ports 1941–45; Ruhr 1941–45; Berlin 1941; German Ports 1941–45; Normandy 1944; Walcheren Rhine Biscay 1942–43; Arabian Sea; Libya

Insignia
- Squadron Badge heraldry: An eagle's head erased, facing to the sinister and holding in the beak a sprig of maple.

Aircraft flown
- Bomber: Wellington; Halifax; Lancaster
- Patrol: C-45 Expeditor; CP-127 (P2V-7) Neptune; CP-107 Argus; CP-140 Aurora

405 Long Range Patrol Squadron is a unit of the Royal Canadian Air Force (RCAF) within the Canadian Forces, initially formed as No. 405 Squadron RCAF during the Second World War.

== Service history ==
=== World War II ===
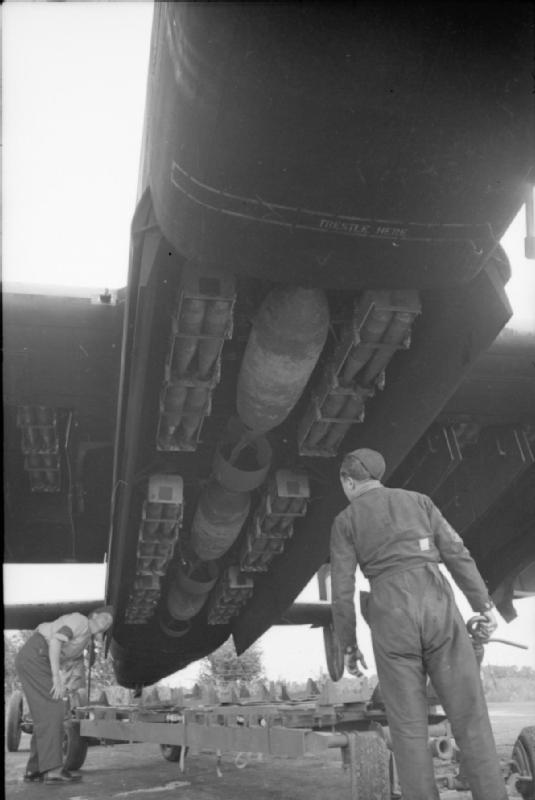
Armourers check over a mixed bomb load of three 1,000 lb MC bombs and small bomb containers (SBCs) filled with 30 lb incendiary bombs, loaded into the bomb-bay and wing cells of a Handley Page Halifax Mark II of 405 Squadron RCAF at RAF Pocklington, England

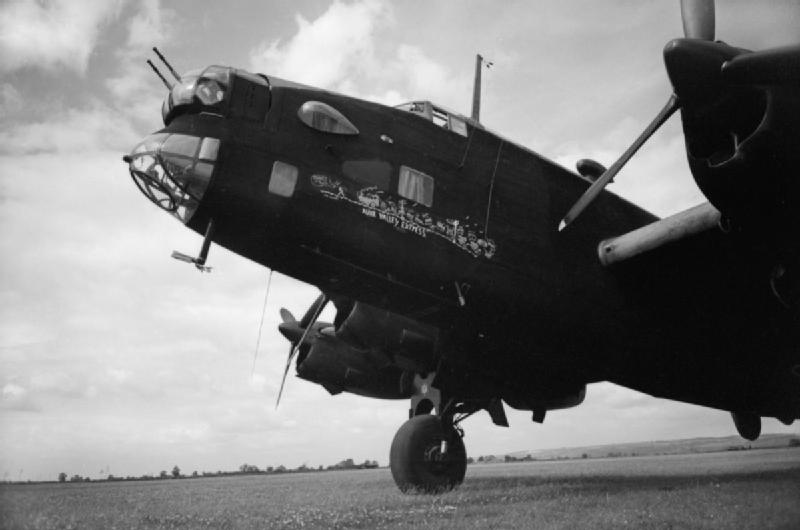
405 Squadron Halifax "Ruhr Valley Express" at RAF Pocklington. This aircraft was lost returning from a raid on Flensburg in October 1942

No. 405 Squadron RCAF was formed at Driffield, Yorkshire, on 23 April 1941 as an Article XV squadron and equipped with the Vickers Wellington bomber. It flew the RCAF's first bombing operation ten weeks later on 12/13 June, attacking the railway marshalling yards at Schwerte. It converted to the Handley Page Halifax in April 1942, taking part in the historic 1,000-bomber raid on Cologne on the night of 30/31 May 1942.

In late October 1942, the squadron was loaned to Coastal Command to fly anti-submarine patrols in the Bay of Biscay at the time of the North African landings.

Returning to Bomber Command at the beginning of March 1943, the squadron flew with No. 6 Group RCAF for short time before being selected for the elite No. 8 (Pathfinder) Group based at Gransden Lodge Airfield, with which it served until the end of the war. Through the last 20 months of the bomber offensive the squadron was equipped with the Avro Lancaster.

The squadron's last operational mission took place on 25 April 1945 when nine Lancasters bombed the Berghof, and four aircraft bombed enemy gun batteries on island of Wangerooge. The squadron was disbanded on 5 September 1945.

=== Post war ===
The squadron was reformed on 1 April 1947 as No. 405 Bomber Reconnaissance Squadron at RCAF Station Greenwood, and was later redesignated No. 405 Maritime Reconnaissance Squadron and then No. 405 Maritime Patrol Squadron.

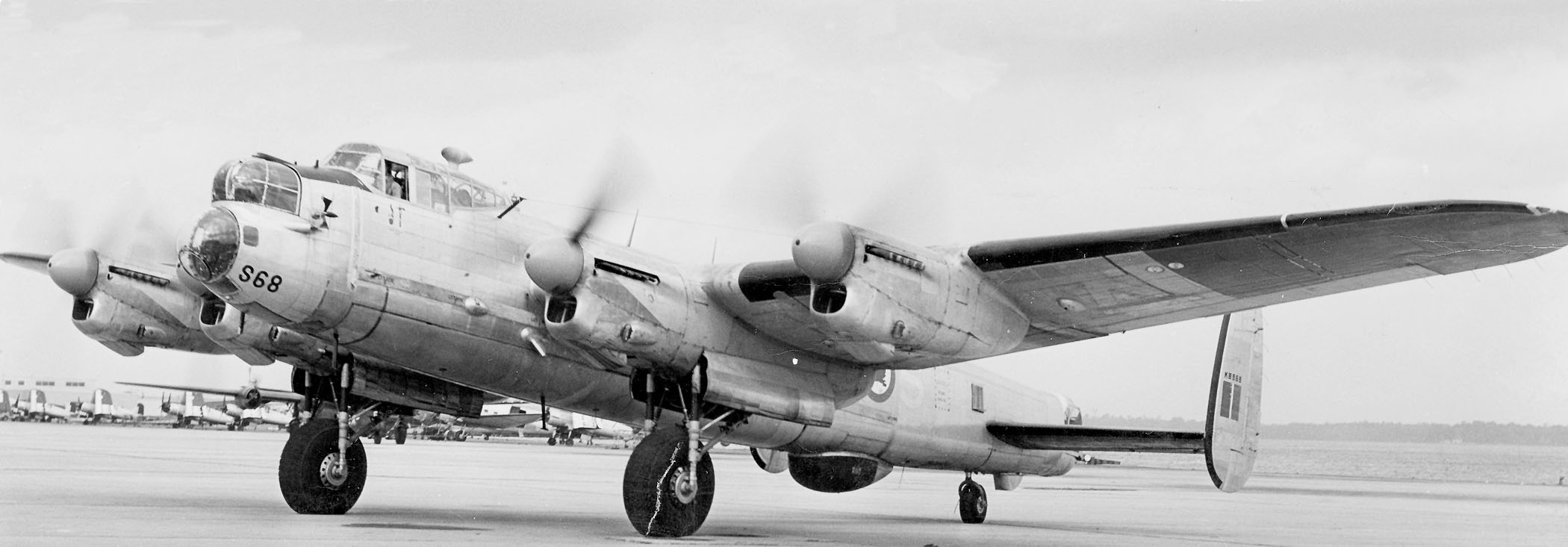
Lancaster of 405 Squadron at Naval Air Station Jacksonville, Florida in 1953.

In April 1950, as a Maritime Patrol Squadron, the squadron was equipped with modified Mark X Lancasters. These were replaced in mid-1955 by the P2V7 Neptune giving the squadron a much greater anti-submarine capability.

In April 1958 the squadron was given the distinction of being the first to fly the Canadian-built CP-107 Argus. The squadron made its last flight in the Argus on 10 November 1980 before introducing the CP-140 Aurora.

== Current operations ==
Though 405 Squadron's primary combat functions are anti-submarine (ASW) and anti-surface warfare (ASUW), most of its time is spent fulfilling a variety of non-combat roles. These include search and rescue, counter-drug operations with the RCMP, and anti-pollution and fisheries patrols. It flew operations in the Arabian Sea after the 11 September 2001 terrorist attacks.
