= Comox Air Force Museum =

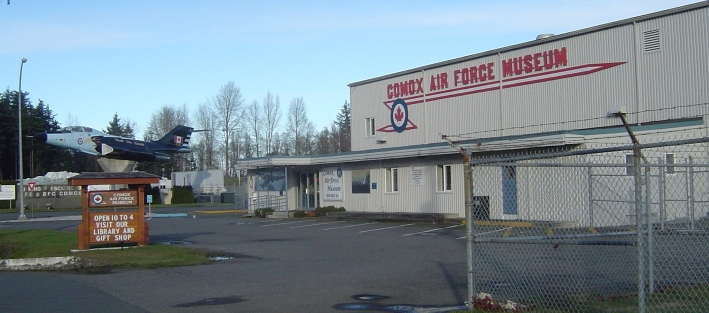
- Established: 1987
- Location: CFB Comox, 19 Wing Comox, Lazo, British Columbia
- Coordinates: 49.7147°N 124.9084°W
- Type: military aviation museum
- Website: http://www.comoxairforcemuseum.ca/

The Comox Air Force Museum collects, preserves, interprets and exhibits artifacts relating to CFB Comox, its squadrons and its units. The museum is located at the main gate of CFB Comox, located in the Comox Valley on Vancouver Island, British Columbia. The museum opened its doors in the current location 12 September 1987. In addition to the exhibits, the museum has an aviation reference library and an aviation art gallery. The Heritage Air Park where the aircraft are on display is located 500 metres down the road from the museum as is the Y2K Spitfire restoration hangar.

== Aircraft ==
The following aircraft are on display in the Comox Air Force Museum's Heritage Air Park located 500 meters from the museum:

- CF-100 Canuck
- CF-101 Voodoo
- CF-104 Starfighter (Recently removed)
- CP-107 Argus
- CP-121 Tracker
- CT-114 Tutor (has been moved to the Comox Valley Visitor Centre just off Inland Hwy)
- CT-133 Silver Star
- De Havilland Vampire
- Douglas Dakota
- Piasecki H-21
- Sikorsky CH-124 Sea King

== Exhibits ==
=== First World War ===
This exhibit displays artifacts from the First World War focusing on airman from the west coast.

=== Second World War ===
This exhibit has many artifacts from the Second World War some of which include:

- A fire balloon many of which were launched by the Japanese in hopes of setting the west coast of North America on fire.
- John Colwell's Stalag Luft III POW Log Book.
- James Francis Edwards
- Douglas "Duke" Warren

=== UN peacekeeping ===
This exhibit displays many artifacts from Canada's part in UN peacekeeping missions.

=== 19 Wing's squadrons ===
==== Past squadrons exhibit ====
This exhibit displays artifacts from squadrons that served at Comox, but have since moved or been disbanded.

  - 409 Squadron
    - Orenda 11 turbojet engine
    - AIR-2 Genie Missile load training device
    - CF-101 Voodoo ejection seat
  - 414 Squadron
    - The Black Knight Suit of Armour
  - VU 33 Squadron
    - Tracker Tail Hook

==== Present squadrons exhibit ====
This exhibit displays artifacts from squadrons currently serving at Comox.

  - 442 Squadron
    - Search and Rescue Technician Jump Suit
  - 407 Squadron
    - Wright 3350 Cyclone 18 Piston Engine
    - Torpedo
    - Sonobuoy

== Vehicles ==
- Willys Jeep

== Affiliations ==
The Museum is affiliated with: CMA, CHIN, OMMC and Virtual Museum of Canada.

== See also ==
- Organization of Military Museums of Canada
- Military history of Canada
