= Canadair CP-107 Argus =

Canadian 1950s maritime patrol aircraft

CP-107 Argus
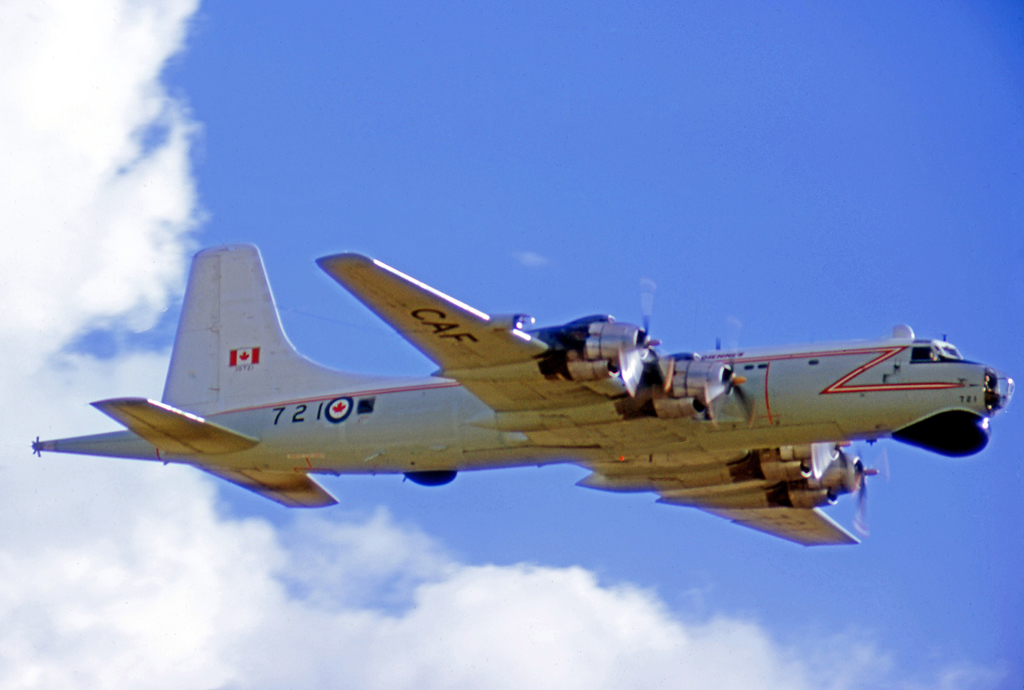

General information
- Type: Maritime patrol aircraft
- Manufacturer: Canadair
- Designer: Tom Harvie
- Primary users: Royal Canadian Air Force Canadian Forces
- Number built: 33

History
- Manufactured: 1957-1960
- Introduction date: 1958
- First flight: 27 March 1957
- Retired: 1982
- Developed from: Bristol Britannia

The Canadair CP-107 Argus (company designation CL-28) is a maritime patrol aircraft designed and manufactured by Canadair for the Royal Canadian Air Force (RCAF). The Argus served throughout the Cold War in the RCAF's Maritime Air Command and later the Canadian Force's Maritime Air Group and Air Command.

== Design and development ==
In 1949, Canadair recognized that the RCAF would soon be looking for a replacement for the Avro Lancasters being used in the maritime patrol role and proposed the CL-29, a variant of the North Star, itself a variant of the Douglas C-54 Skymaster or DC-4 transport. When the RCAF issued the specification in 1952, it was for a larger and more capable aircraft, and two proposals were received. These included a Lockheed Constellation variant from Lockheed, however its low speed handling was deemed inadequate by the RCAF, while Bristol proposed a variant of their Britannia airliner. However, concerns were raised over its floating controls, where they were controlled via servo tabs rather than direct linkages. The RCAF preferred the Bristol proposal, but it would be developed in Canada. Canadair presented two proposals, the CL-28 also based on the Britannia, which was accepted, and a lowest cost design called the CL-33 which was described as a fat Lancaster. It would have been comparable to the Avro Shackleton already being operated by the RAF, but significantly lighter, and was to be powered by the same engines as were used in the CL-28, or similar radial engines.

Canadair began work on the CL-28 in April 1954 and at the time it was the largest aircraft to be built in Canada. The hybrid design, initially referred to as the 'Britannia Maritime Reconnaissance', or 'Britannia MR', was derived from the Bristol Britannia airliner, having the same wings, tail surfaces and landing gear except for being "Americanized" – meaning that it used the same general design, but changed from British materials, dimensions and standard parts to American ones. Due to the greater stresses from flying at low altitude for long periods of time, even the components taken from the Britannia needed substantial reinforcement, and to meet these demands, extensive use of a locally developed metal to metal bonding was used. The Argus represented the first large scale use of titanium in the structure, as well as structural plastic, which was used to electrically insulate the top of the fin for the sensors mounted there.

The fuselage was completely redesigned by Canadair, going from the pressure cabin used in the Britannia to an unpressurised one with two 18 ft (5.5 m) long bomb bays fore and aft of the wings. The engines were also changed from the Bristol Proteus turboprop engines to Wright R-3350 turbo-compound piston radial engines, which had lower fuel consumption necessary for extended missions at low level. At the design stage the Napier Nomad, another turbo-compound engine, was also considered, although the Nomad was later cancelled.

=== Test program ===
Seven aircraft were used for the development program, with each one specializing in specific systems or problem. Argus 20710 tested controls and stability, 20711 equipment and environment, 20712 did cold weather testing, 20713 structural tests and demonstrating RCAF requirements, while 20714 was used for weapons testing, and 20715 completed the operational evaluation. In July 1960, a CP-107 Argus visited Eglin AFB, Florida, for hot weather testing.

== Operational history ==
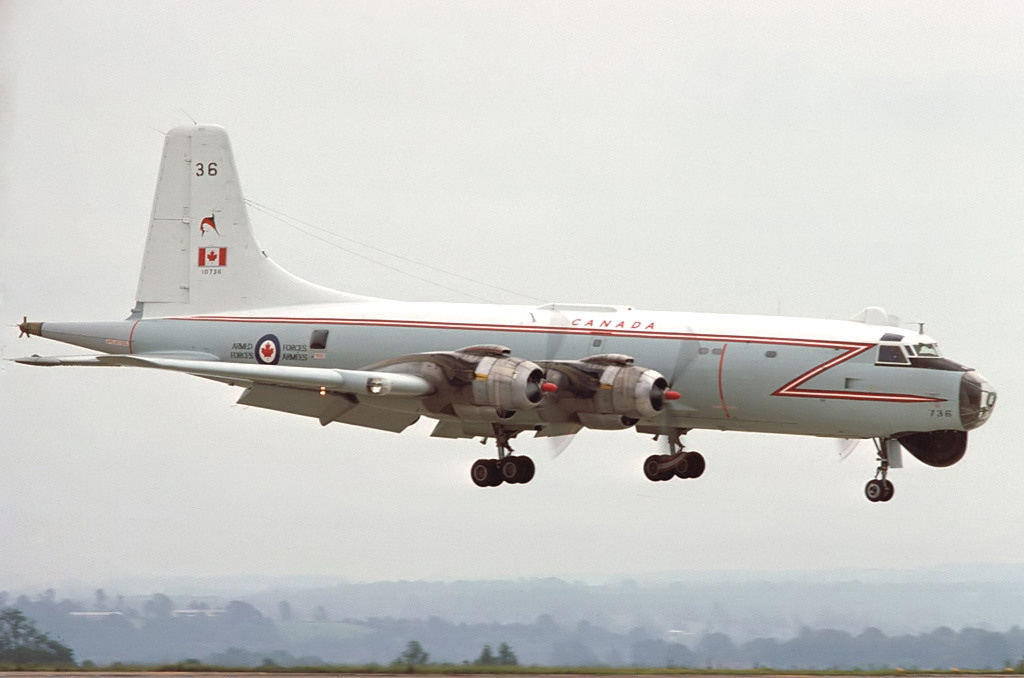
Canadian Armed Forces 415 Squadron Argus Mk.2 descending

The Argus replaced the last of the Avro Lancasters as well as the Lockheed Neptunes that had been bought as an interim measure pending the arrival of the Argus in the maritime reconnaissance or patrol role.

One of the most effective anti-submarine warfare (ASW) aircraft of its day, the Argus was a mainstay for the RCAF. A large amount of equipment was carried, including: search radar, sonobuoys, electronic counter measures (ECM), explosive echo ranging (EER) and magnetic anomaly detector (MAD). Up to 8,000 lb (3,600 kg) of weapons could be carried in the bomb bays, including torpedoes and depth charges.

A flight crew of 15 consisting of three pilots, three navigators (Observer Long range), two flight engineers and six radio officers (observer rad) until the early 1960s when the crew included both commissioned officers (tactical navigator/radio navigator) and non commissioned officers (observers), the number of which was dependent on the mission. Four crew bunks and a galley were provided to extend the efficiency of the crew on long patrols (average 18 hrs). The CL-28 had an endurance of approximately 26½ hours with full armament.

An Argus flown by 407 Maritime Patrol Squadron on 1-2 October 1959 held the Canadian military record of slightly over 31 hours for the longest flight by an unrefuelled aircraft, while covering a distance of 4,570 mi (7,350 km) from RNZAF Base Ohakea in New Zealand to Naval Air Station Barbers Point in Hawaii, before continuing across the rest of Pacific and most of Canada. Due to unexpectedly strong headwinds that greatly increased fuel consumption, they chose to land in RCAF Station North Bay where they had less than an hour of fuel remaining, after an additional 20 hours of flying. The 31 hour record flight broke the previous distance record, set by another Argus from the same squadron, of 4,210 miles (6,780 km).

The principal difference between the Mk.1 and Mk.2 was in the different navigation, communication and tactical electronic equipment fitted internally. Externally, the Mk II had a smaller redesigned nose radome and additional ECM antenna above the fuselage.

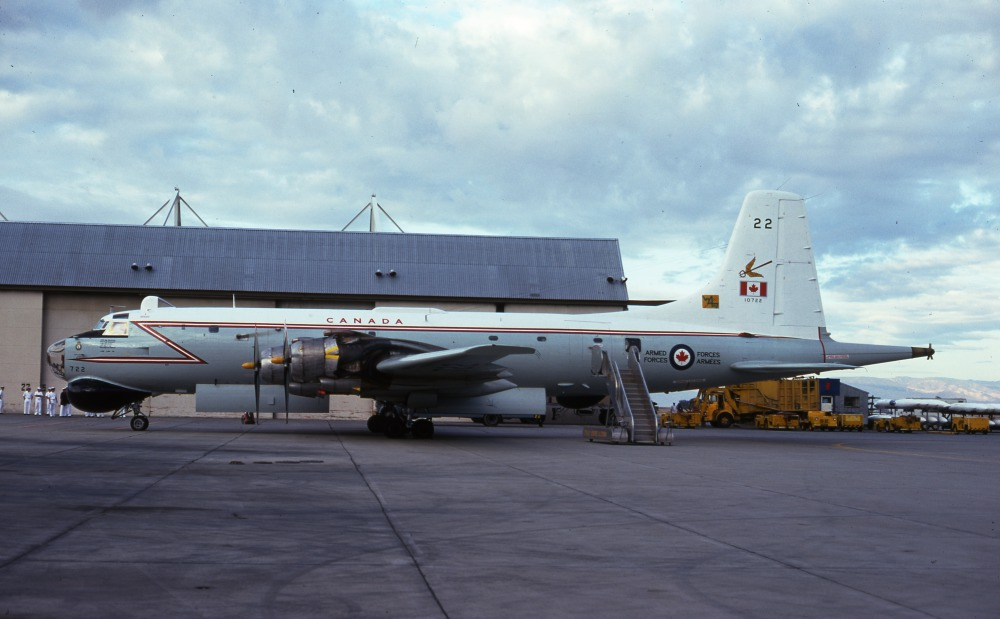
407 Squadron Argus Mk.1 with larger chin radome

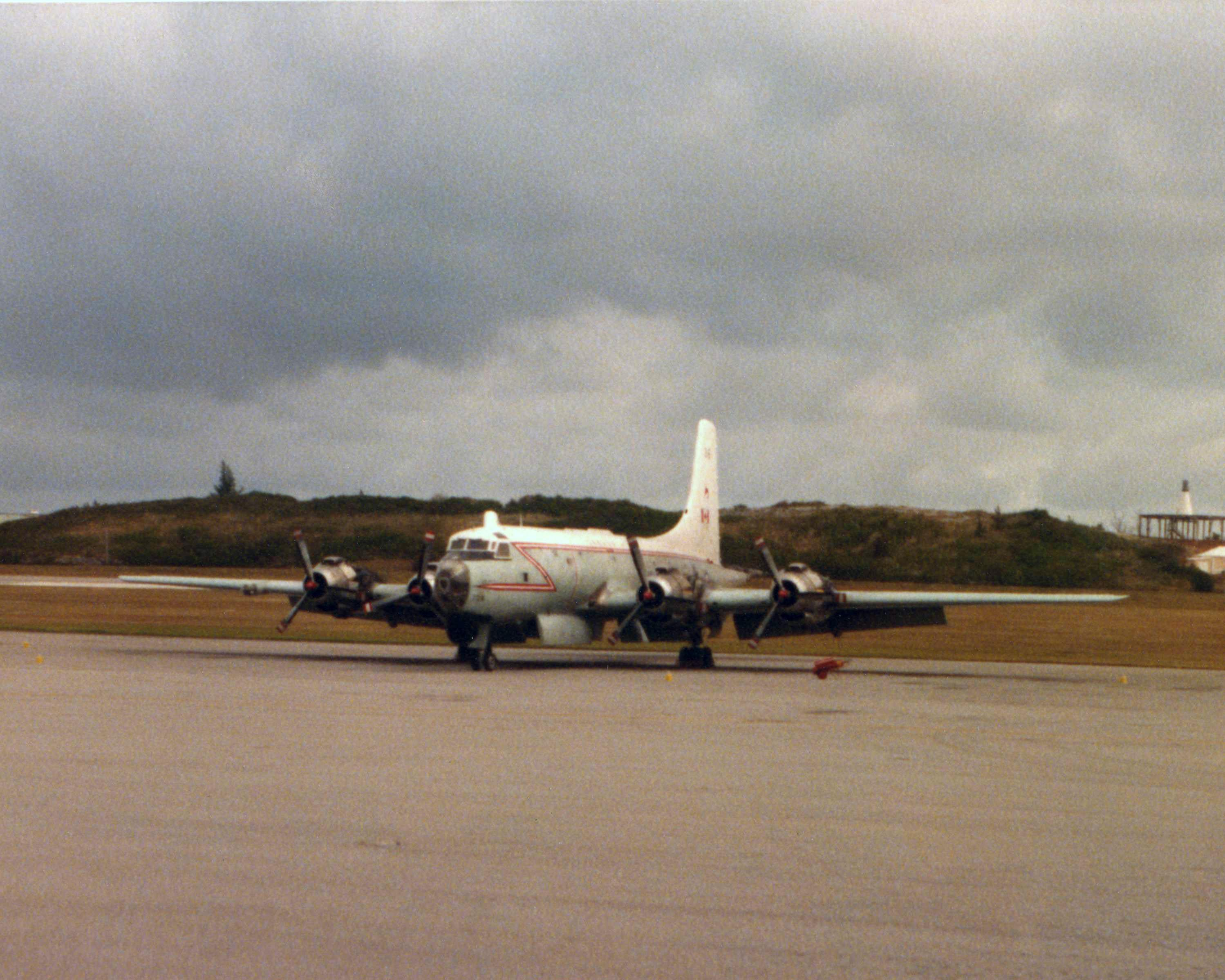
415 Squadron Argus Mk.2 deployed to Bermuda in 1979.

The Argus flew its last service mission on 24 July 1981, and was replaced by the Lockheed CP-140 Aurora.

== Variants ==
- Argus Mk.1/CL-28-1 : Long-range maritime reconnaissance aircraft for the RCAF. This aircraft was fitted with an American AN/APS-20 radar in a chin-mounted radome. 13 built. (serials 20710-20722)
- Argus Mk.2/CL-28-2 : Long-range maritime reconnaissance aircraft for the RCAF. This aircraft was fitted with a British ASV-21 radar in a chin-mounted radome. 20 built. (serials 20723-20742)

== Operators ==
Canada

- Royal Canadian Air Force (dissolved 31 January 1968)
  - RCAF Station Greenwood
    - 2 (Maritime) Operational Training Unit (2 (M) OTU) - April 1958 to 31 January 1968
      - Argus Conversion Unit (ACU) - detachment from 2 (M) OTU.
    - Maritime Proving & Evaluation Unit (MP & EU) - 1 August 1959 to 31 January 1968
    - No. 404 Squadron RCAF - 15 April 1959 to 31 January 1968
    - No. 405 Squadron RCAF - 7 August 1958 to 31 January 1968
  - RCAF Station Summerside
    - No. 415 Squadron RCAF - 8 June 1961 to 31 January 1968
- Canadian Armed Forces (formed 1 February 1968 from RCAF, all surviving aircraft (32 of the 33) were renumbered at this time, from 207XX to 107XX)
  - Canadian Forces Base Greenwood
    - 2 (Maritime) Operational Training Unit (2 (M) OTU) - 1 February 1968 to 1 April 1968
    - Maritime Proving & Evaluation Unit (MP & EU) - 1 February 1968 to 25 June 1980
    - 404 Maritime Patrol Squadron - 1 February 1968 to 19 August 1980
    - 405 Maritime Patrol Squadron - 1 February 1968 to 11 November 1980
    - 449 Maritime Training Squadron - merged from 2 (M) OTU, ACU and ground training units and operated from 1 April 1968 to 29 August 1975
  - Canadian Forces Base Comox
    - 407 Maritime Patrol Squadron - 17 May 1968 to 29 June 1981
  - Canadian Forces Base Summerside
    - 415 Maritime Patrol Squadron - 1 February 1968 to 24 July 1981

== Accidents and incidents ==
- On 23 March 1965, 404 Squadron Argus 20727 was lost 60 miles (97 km) north of the Puerto Rican coast with all hands during a night ASW exercise with HMS Alcide. The Argus completed a low pass of the submarine and then commenced a hard bank. The wing struck a high swell and the aircraft cartwheeled in to the ocean, killing all 16 on board.
- 31 March 1977, with one engine shut down after a malfunction during a patrol mission, 415 Squadron Argus 20737 was seconds from touching down at CFB Summerside when it abruptly lost altitude and began yawing strongly to the left while dropping one wing. Weather at the time included thunderstorms, heavy rains and strong winds. It impacted to the left of the runway nose high and left wing low, before becoming airborne again, only to continue veering to the left, barely missing the control tower thanks to the effort of the pilot, until colliding with a parked Nordair Lockheed Electra, tearing the Electra's wing open and severing the rear fuselage, before coming to a stop, all while being followed by a fireball. Fifteen of the crew escaped the fire, but one died in the crash and two others later died from their injuries.

== Aircraft on display ==
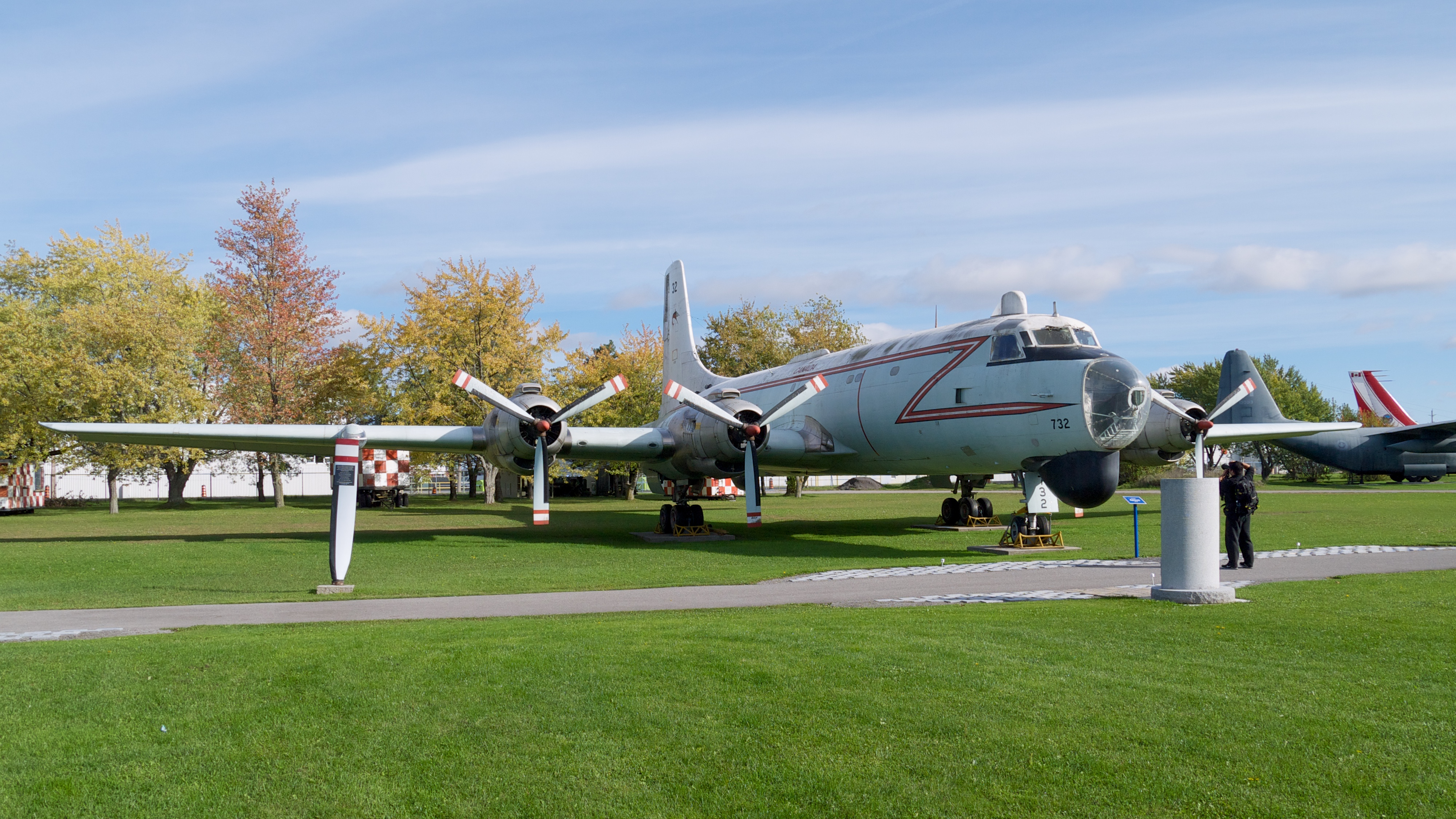
Argus 10732 on display outside the National Air Force Museum of Canada

- 10712 – Argus Mk.1 is on static display outside at the Comox Air Force Museum in Comox, British Columbia.
- 10717 – Argus Mk.1 is on static display outside at the Greenwood Military Aviation Museum in Greenwood, Nova Scotia.
- 10732 – Argus Mk.2 is on static display outside at the National Air Force Museum of Canada in Trenton, Ontario.
- 10739 – Argus Mk.2 is on static display outside at the Air Force Heritage Park at Summerside Airport in Summerside, Prince Edward Island.
- 10742 – Argus Mk.2 is on static display in the reserve hangar at the Canada Aviation and Space Museum in Ottawa, Ontario.

== Specifications (Canadair CL-28-1 Argus Mk.1) ==
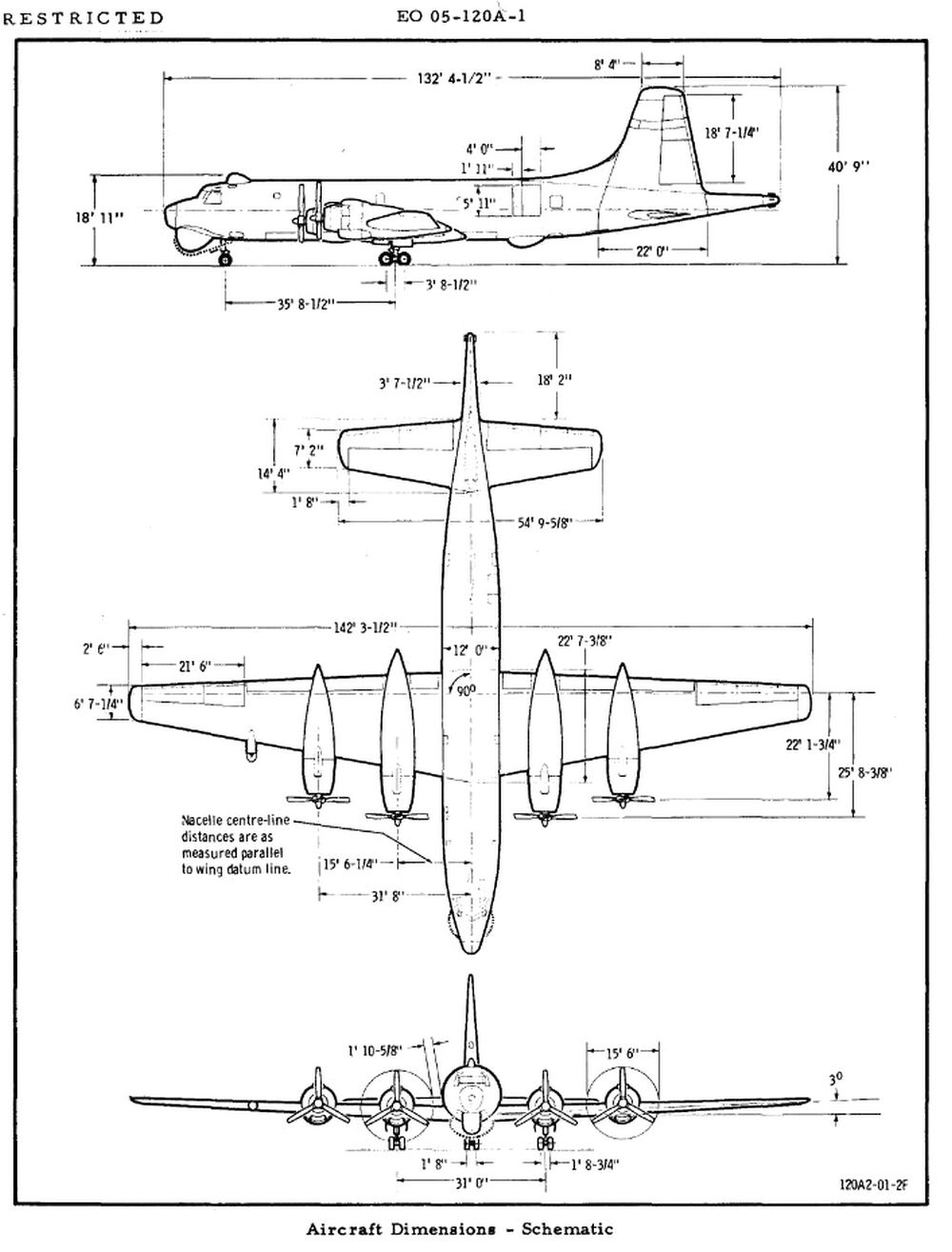
Canadair CL-28 Argus drawing from the aircraft manual

Data from The Encyclopedia of World Aircraft

General characteristics

- Crew: 15
- Length: 132 ft 4.5 in (40.348 m)
- Wingspan: 142 ft 3.5 in (43.371 m)
- Height: 40 ft 9 in (12.42 m)
- Wing area: 2,075 sq ft (192.8 m^{2})
- Airfoil: Root: NACA 25017 Tip: NACA 4413
- Empty weight: 81,000 lb (36,741 kg)
- Max takeoff weight: 157,000 lb (71,214 kg)
- Fuel capacity: 6,640 imp gal (30,200 L; 7,970 US gal)
- Powerplant: 4 × Wright R-3350 TC18EA1 18 cylinder Turbo-Compound air-cooled radial engines, 3,700 hp (2,800 kW) each
- Propellers: 3-bladed Curtiss-Wright Electric C634S-C554 metal variable-pitch propeller, 15 ft 6 in (4.72 m) diameter

Performance

- Maximum speed: 315 mph (507 km/h, 274 kn)
- Cruise speed: 207 mph (333 km/h, 180 kn)
- Range: 5,900 mi (9,500 km, 5,100 nmi)
- Service ceiling: 25,000 ft (7,600 m)

Armament
(Maximum load of 8,000 lb (3,600 kg))

- Internal load:
  - Mark 30, Mark 43 mod 0, Mark 44 and Mark 46 torpedoes.
  - 350 lb (160 kg) Mark 54 depth bombs and practice bombs.
  - Sonobuoys.
  - Mark 400 Signal Underwater Sound Charges (SUS).
  - LUU2/B 2 million candle power parachute flares. Mines were neither trialled nor used.
- External load: (maximum 3,800 lb (1,700 kg))
  - The Argus carried out trials for AGM-12B Bullpup air-to-surface missiles and 2.75 inch Folding-Fin Aerial Rockets (FFAR) but these were never used operationally.

Avionics

- Radar systems:
  - AN/APS-20 search radar in Mk.I, or ASV-21 radar in Mk.II
  - APS-94D Side-looking airborne radar (SLAR), trialled but not used operationally.
- Passive sensors:
  - Jezebel Low Frequency Analyzer and Recorder sonobuoy sound analyzer to identify distance and type of vessel
  - Magnetic Anomaly Detector (MAD) on extended tail boom to measure presence of iron from a vessel's hull
  - AN/ALR-8 radio direction finding and interception to triangulate location of radio transmitters
  - AN/APA-74 radar signal pulse identification for identifying and locating submarine radar transmissions
  - AN/ASR-3 exhaust trail indicator for identifying presence of submarine diesel engine exhaust
- Other:
  - 70 million candlepower searchlight for night visual identification

== See also ==
- Birth of a Giant, a 1957 short documentary about the aircraft's development
- Lockheed CP-140 Aurora - successor to the Argus
- Lockheed P-2 Neptune - aircraft the Argus replaced

Related development

- Bristol Britannia
- Canadair CL-44 Yukon

Aircraft of comparable role, configuration, and era

- Bréguet 1150 Atlantic
- Ilyushin Il-38
- Kawasaki P-2J
- Lockheed P-3 Orion
