= 407 Long Range Patrol Squadron =

- 407^{e} Escadron de patrouille à longue portée (French)
- Active: 1941–1945; 1952–present
- Country: Canada
- Branch: Royal Canadian Air Force
- Role: Long range patrol
- Part of: 19 Wing Comox
- Based at: CFB Comox
- Nickname: Demon Squadron
- Motto: To hold on high
- Battle honours: Atlantic, 1943–1945; English Channel and North Sea, 1941–1945; Fortress Europe, 1942; German Ports, 1942; Normandy, 1944; Biscay, 1942–1945; Libya, 2011; Arabian Sea
- Website: www.canada.ca/en/air-force/corporate/squadrons/407-squadron.html

Aircraft flown
- Bomber: Bristol Blenheim; Lockheed Hudson; Vickers Wellington; Avro Lancaster
- Patrol: Lockheed CP-122 Neptune; Canadair CP-107 Argus; Lockheed CP-140 Aurora

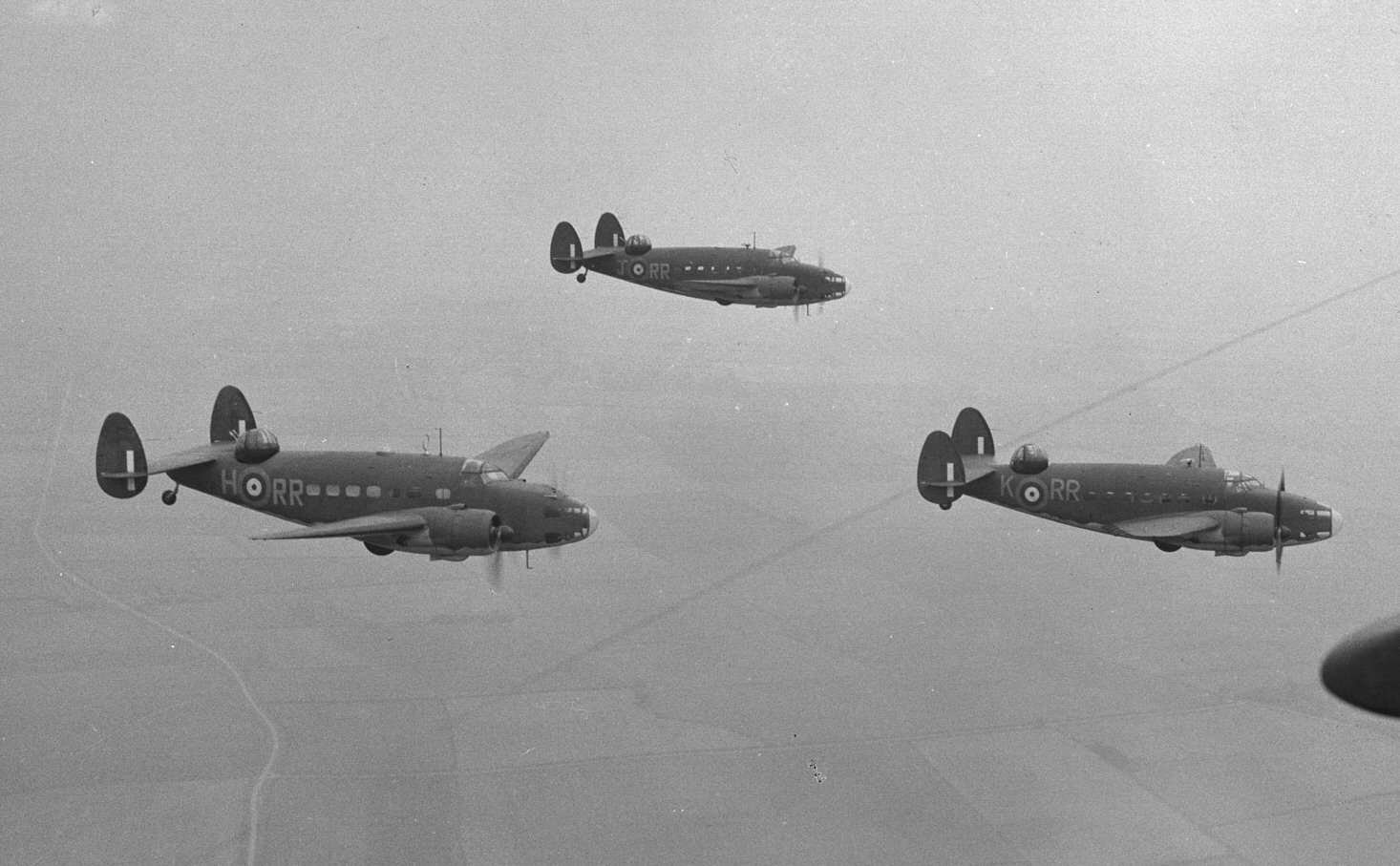
407 Sqn Hudsons over the UK in 1942

407 Long Range Patrol Squadron (abbreviated 407 LRP Sqn, formerly 407 Maritime Patrol Squadron) is a long range and maritime patrol squadron of the Royal Canadian Air Force. It is located at 19 Wing Comox, on Vancouver Island, British Columbia, and operates the Lockheed CP-140 Aurora. The unit was formed during the Second World War, operating from British bases as maritime patrol and strike unit.

== History ==
No. 407 Coastal Strike Squadron was formed at RAF Thorney Island, England on 8 May 1941, first training on the Bristol Blenheim. It was one of seven Article XV RCAF units to serve with RAF Coastal Command.

The squadron's wartime history can be divided into two periods. From September 1941 to January 1943, the squadron operated as a "strike" squadron attacking enemy shipping with the Lockheed Hudson. It was as a strike squadron that it won its reputation and its nickname "The Demon Squadron". On 29 January 1943 it was re-designated as 407 General Reconnaissance Squadron, and for the remainder of the war it protected friendly shipping from the U-boat threat operating the Vickers Wellington. The squadron was disbanded on 4 June 1945 following the end of the Second World War.

On 1 July 1952 the squadron was reactivated at RCAF Station Comox as 407 Maritime Reconnaissance Squadron flying the Avro Lancaster. On 17 July 1956 it was redesignated as a Maritime Patrol Squadron. The squadron has served continuously in Comox since 1952 flying the Lancaster, Lockheed Neptune, and Canadair CP-107 Argus. On 28 June 1975, the squadron was presented its standard by Walter Stewart Owen, Lieutenant Governor of British Columbia. 407 Squadron flies the Lockheed CP-140 Aurora on coastal patrol, anti-submarine and long range patrol duties. It used these aircraft to conduct operations in the Arabian Sea after the 11 September 2001 terrorist attacks.
