= Greenwood Military Aviation Museum =

Aviation museum in Nova Scotia, Canada

- Established: 1992; 34 years ago
- Location: Greenwood, Nova Scotia
- Coordinates: 44.977026°N 64.929413°W
- Website: http://www.gmam.ca/home.html

The Greenwood Military Aviation Museum is an aviation museum located in Greenwood, Nova Scotia. The museum houses 15 aircraft and is highlighted by its Avro Lancaster, one of only 17 remaining in the world and one of only three to have flown sorties over continental Europe. The inside of the museum contains multiple ever changing displays showcasing 14 Wing Greenwoods history.

== History ==
The Greenwood Military Aviation Museum is located on CFB Greenwood. The base began its life in 1942 as RAF Station Greenwood, and in July 1944 became RCAF Station Greenwood. Following the Unification of the Canadian Armed Forces in 1968 the base became CFB Greenwood. The museum was begun in 1992 after being initiated by base commander Colonel Kenneth Allen (1941-2017). Since its inception the collection has grown to encompass a large array of aircraft from throughout the RCAF's history.

== Collection ==
=== Airplanes ===
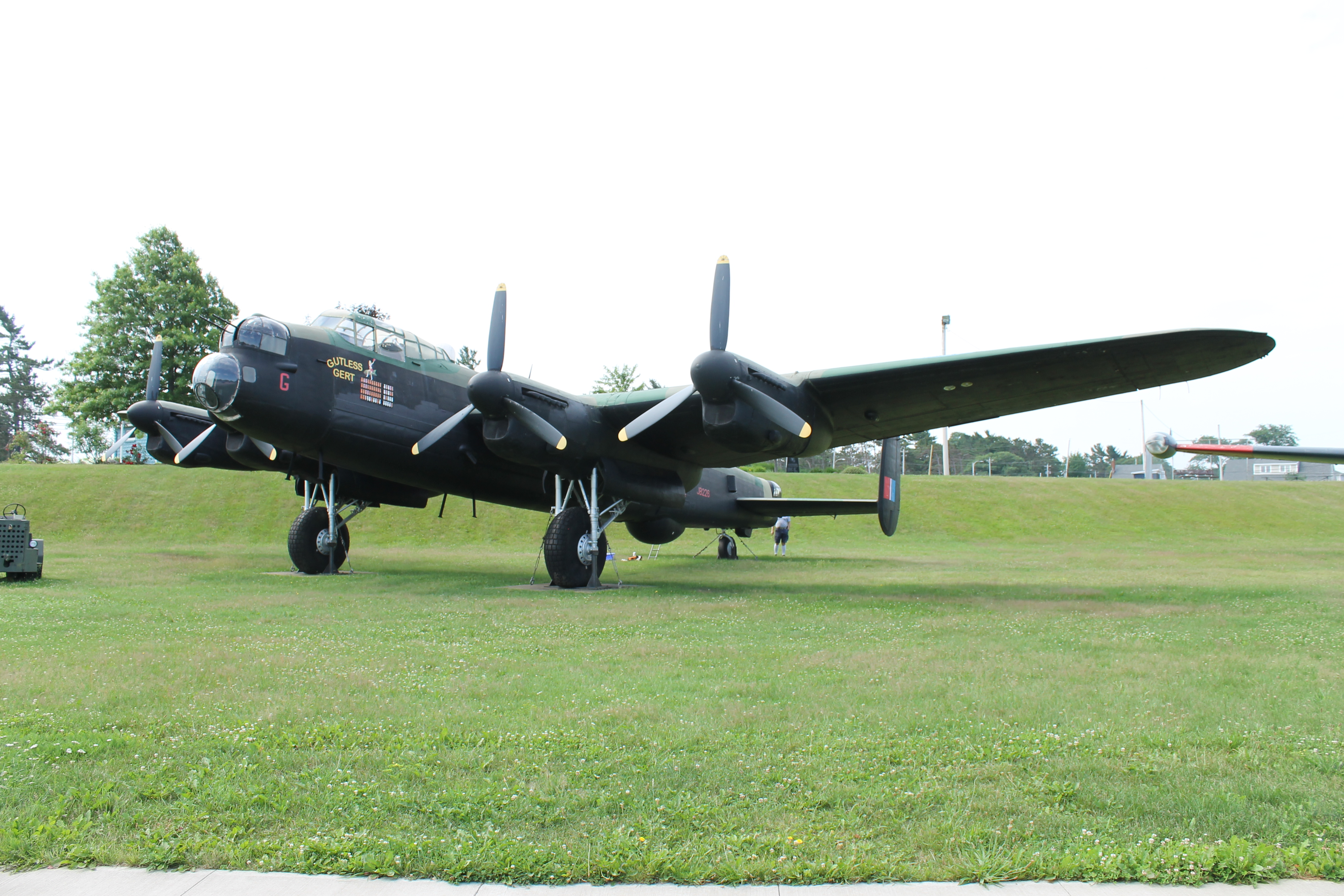
Greenwood Military Aviation Museum's Avro Lancaster Mark X in 2024

The Greenwood Military Aviation Museum contains indoor and outdoor aircraft displayed for the public to view. There are 10 aircraft outside and 5 indoors. The museum includes an annex which contains 2 completely restored WWII aircraft. These aircraft are restored by many of the museums volunteers.

Aircraft	Serial No.
Avro Lancaster B.X	RCAF KB839 painted as JB266
Avro Anson Mk.II	RCAF 7135
Beechcraft CT-128 Expeditor Mk.3N	RCAF 2300 painted as AF662
Canadair CC-144 Challenger	CF 144616
Bristol (Fairchild) Bolingbroke Mk IV.T	RCAF 9997 painted as Blenheim EE-H/N3523
Canadair CP-107 Argus Mk.1	RCAF 10717
Canadair CT-133 Silver Star	RCAF 21434
Douglas CC-129 Dakota Mk. IV U	RCAF KN451 (ex 44-76590)
Lockheed CP-127 Neptune	USN P2V-7 147969, painted as 24113
Lockheed CP-140A Arcturus	CF 140119
Lockheed CC-130E Hercules	CF 130328
Supermarine Spitfire (scale replica)	-

=== UAVs ===
Aircraft	Serial No.
SAGEM CU161 Sperwer UAV	CF 161028

=== Helicopters ===
Aircraft	Serial No.
Boeing-Vertol CH-113A Labrador/Vertol 107-II-28	CF 11308
Vertol Canada CH-127/Piasecki H-44	RCAF 9592 (ex 60-5446)

== Images ==
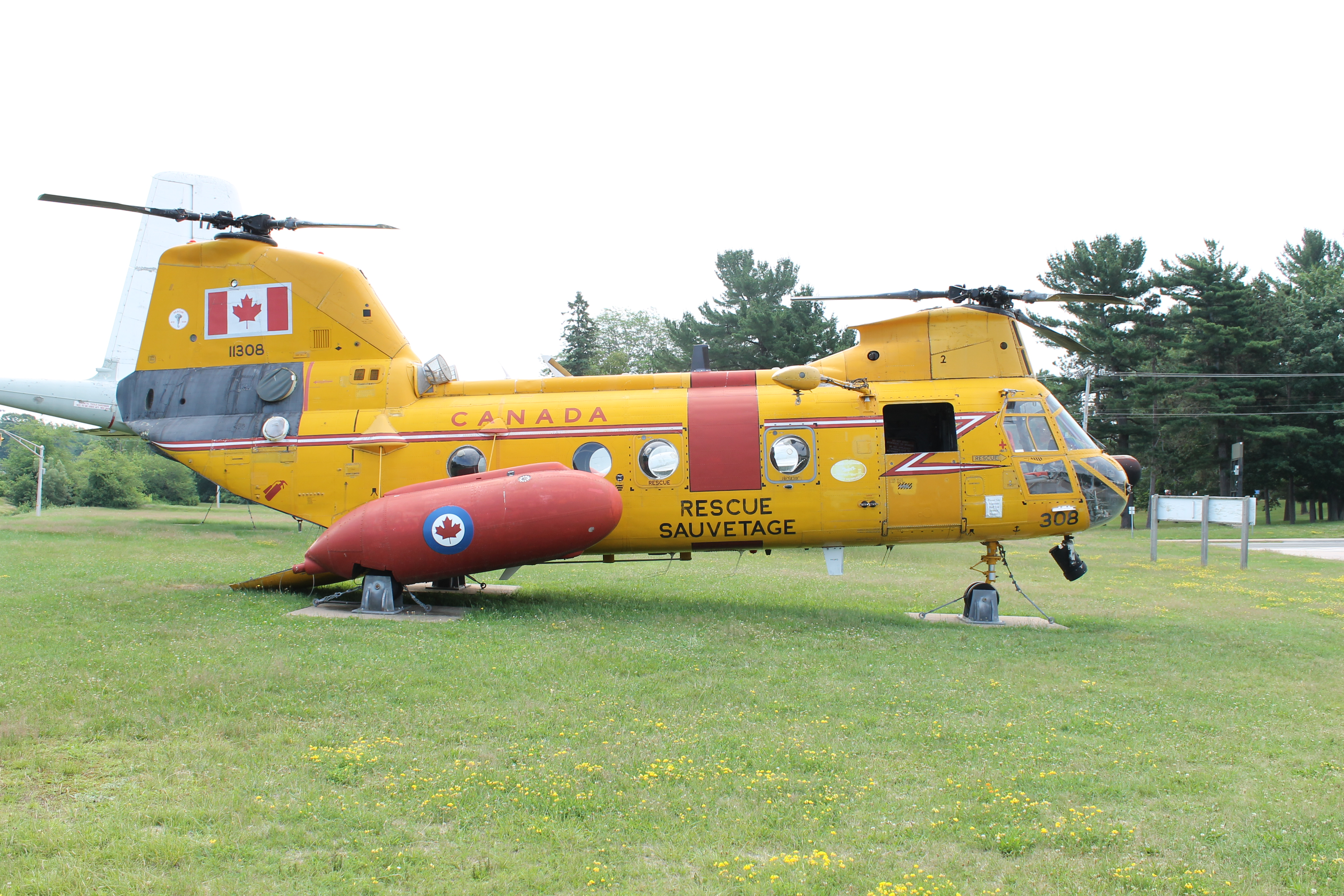
Labrador (CH 113)

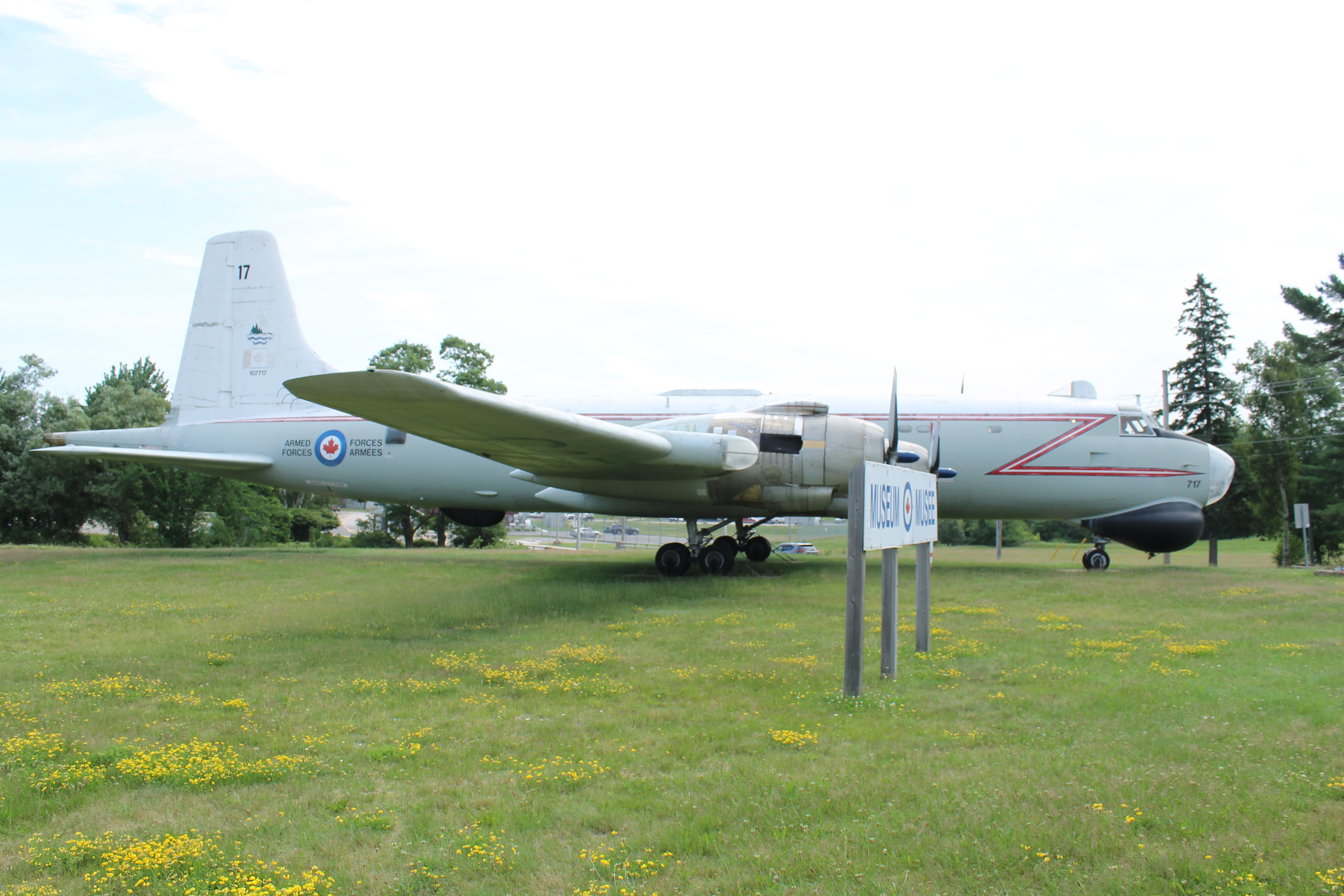
Argus (CP 107)

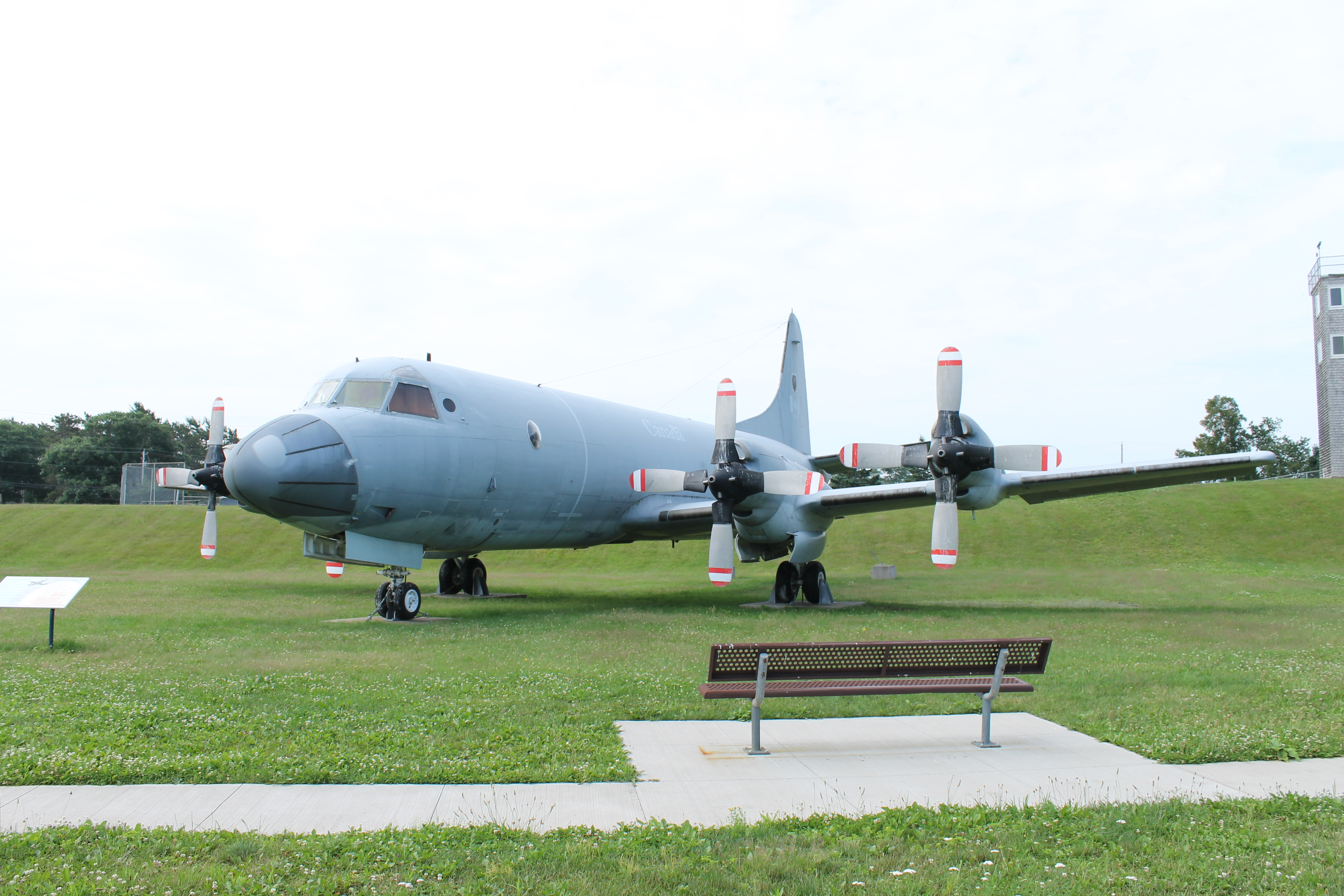
Aurora-Arcturus (CP140-CP140A)

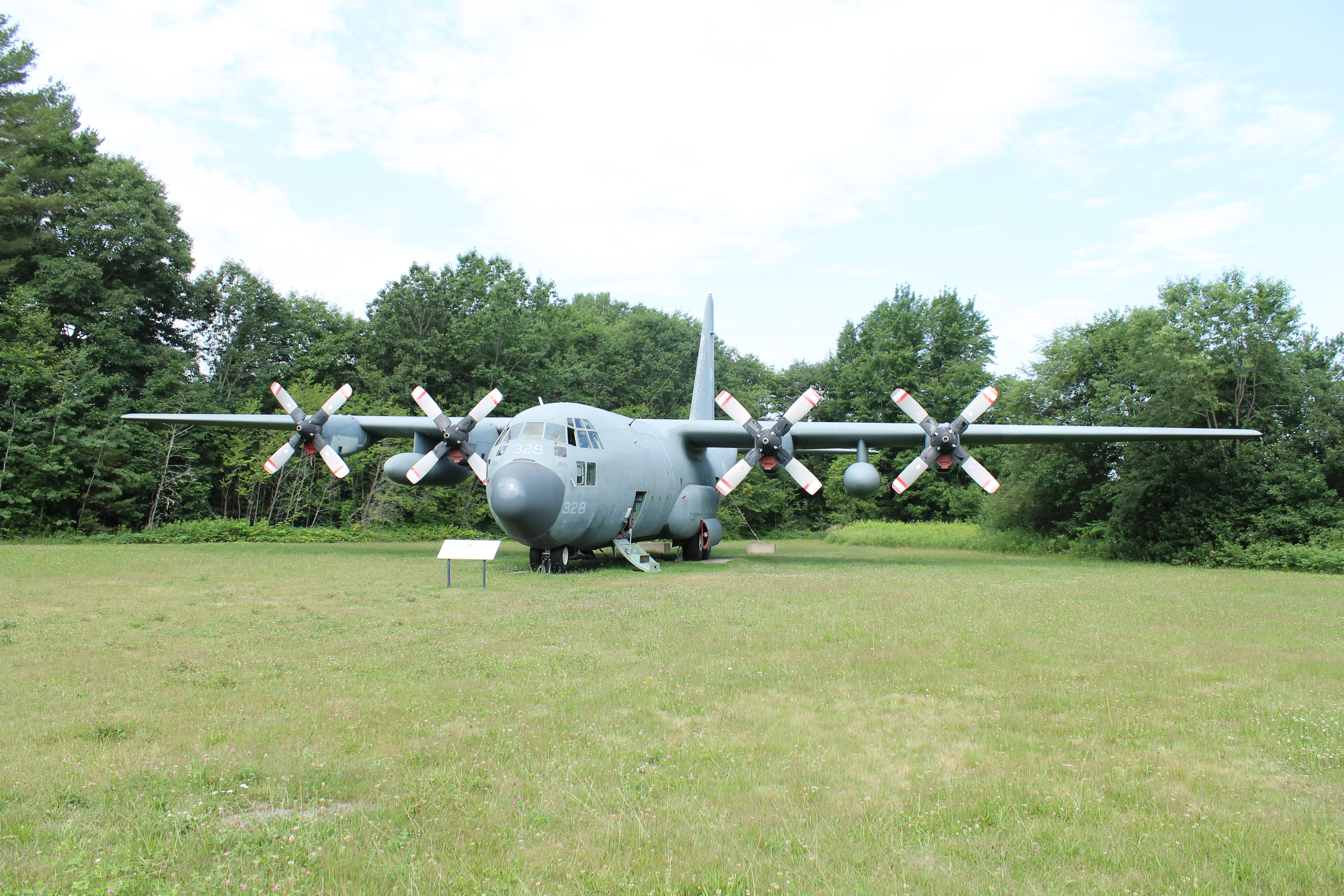
Hercules (CC130)

== See also ==
- List of aviation museums
- List of museums in Nova Scotia
