= CFB Greenwood =

Air force base in Nova Scotia, Canada

CFB Greenwood Greenwood Airport

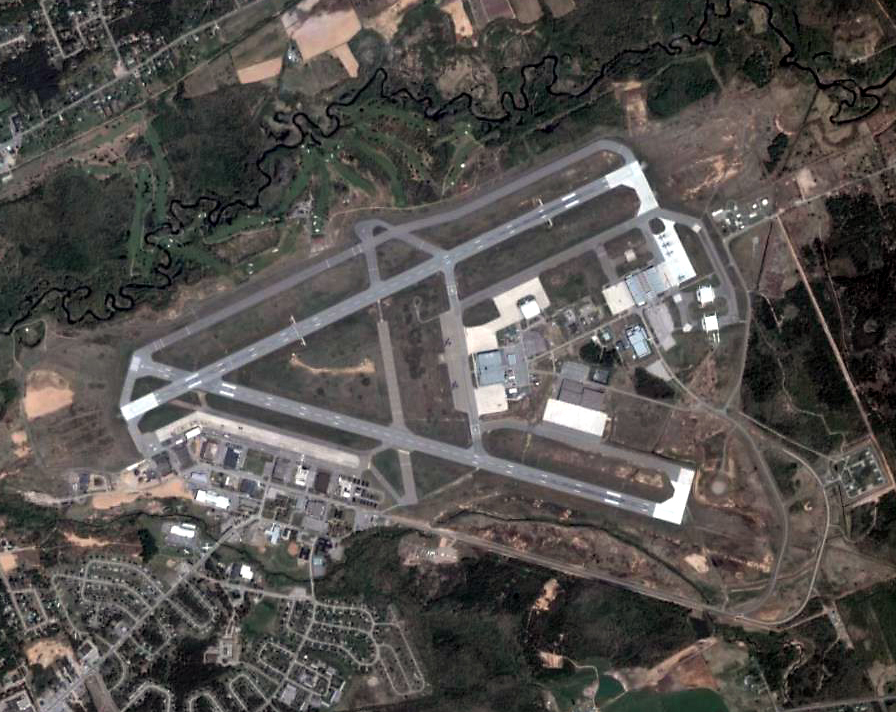
- IATA: YZX; ICAO: CYZX; WMO: 71397

Summary
- Airport type: Military
- Owner: Government of Canada
- Operator: DND
- Location: Greenwood, Nova Scotia
- Time zone: AST (UTC−04:00)
  - Summer (DST): ADT (UTC−03:00)
- Elevation AMSL: 92 ft (28 m)
- Coordinates: 44°59′03″N 064°55′03″W
- Website: CFB 14 Wing Greenwood

Map
- Location in Nova Scotia CYZX (Canada)

Runways
Direction	Length		Surface
Direction	ft	m	Surface
08/26	7,999	2,438	Grooved asphalt
12/30	7,999	2,438	Asphalt

Helipads
Number	Length		Surface
Number	ft	m	Surface
Lima West	98 × 98	30 × 30	Asphalt
Lima East	98 × 98	30 × 30	Asphalt
- Sources: Canada Flight Supplement; Environment Canada

Canadian Forces Base Greenwood (IATA: YZX, ICAO: CYZX), or CFB Greenwood, is a Canadian Forces Base located 1.5 nautical miles (2.8 km; 1.7 mi) east of Greenwood, Nova Scotia. It is primarily operated as an air force base by the Royal Canadian Air Force and is one of two bases in the country using the CP-140 Aurora anti-submarine/maritime patrol and surveillance aircraft, the other being CFB Comox. 413 Transport and Rescue Squadron operates the CC-295 Kingfisher aircraft and CH-149 Cormorant helicopter. Its primary RCAF lodger unit is 14 Wing, commonly referred to as 14 Wing Greenwood.

== RAF Station Greenwood ==
The relatively fog-free climate of the farming hamlet of Greenwood was selected by the Royal Canadian Air Force (RCAF) and Royal Air Force for an airfield as part of the British Commonwealth Air Training Plan (BCATP), following the signing of that formal agreement on December 17, 1939.

The airfield for RAF Station Greenwood was constructed between 1940 and 1942 with the first training units arriving as part of No. 36 Operational Training Unit (OTU) on March 9, 1942. Early training aircraft types included the Lockheed Hudson MK III, the Avro Anson, and the Westland Lysander, all from Britain's Royal Air Force. By the end of August 1942 there were 36 aircraft, and 194 trainees out of a total of 1,474 RAF personnel. By November 1942 the number of trainees had doubled and aircraft had expanded to 80.

In addition to the BCATP program, RAF Station Greenwood was involved in combat operations through maritime reconnaissance to counter U-boat activity in the western Atlantic. These wartime anti-submarine patrols, combined with BCATP training, led to dozens of aircraft crashes throughout the first year of the base being operational, resulting in the deaths of Canadians, as well as 31 airmen from the United Kingdom, Australia and New Zealand.

On December 4, 1942, the Canadian Army provided an anti-aircraft searchlight battery, the 5th Special Mobile Anti-Aircraft Search Light Troop, to provide realistic night training to aircrews.

By the end of 1942, the BCATP was changing across Canada in light of Allied successes in Europe. RAF Station Greenwood was selected to train aircrew on the de Havilland Mosquito, beginning July 3, 1943. The last Hudson left the base on October 3 of that year. Supporting the Mosquito BCATP training were the Airspeed Oxford and Bristol Bolingbroke. The base also became home to North American Harvards and Lockheed Venturas.

=== Aerodrome ===
In approximately 1942 the aerodrome was listed as RCAF Aerodrome - Greenwood, Nova Scotia at 44°59′N 64°55′W with a variation of 23 degrees west and elevation of 80 ft (24 m). The field was listed as "all hard surfaced" and had three runways listed as follows:

Runway name	Length	Width	Surface
1/19	4,000 ft (1,200 m)	150 ft (46 m)	Hard Surfaced
9/27	4,000 ft (1,200 m)	150 ft (46 m)	Hard Surfaced
13/31	4,000 ft (1,200 m)	150 ft (46 m)	Hard Surfaced

== RCAF Station Greenwood ==
On July 1, 1944, RAF Station Greenwood transitioned to the RCAF, becoming RCAF Station Greenwood with No. 36 OTU (RAF) disbanding and No. 8 OTU (RCAF) forming in its place. Under the RCAF, BCATP training continued unabated throughout the course of the Second World War, with a total of 57 airmen killed in 25 crashes between June 1942 and April 1945. The BCATP program was disbanded on March 31, 1945.

A proposed British Commonwealth very long range (VLR) bomber group named "Tiger Force" was scaled down through the spring of 1945. Following VE Day on May 8, 1945, the RCAF units that were to be part of Tiger Force were converted to the Avro Lancaster and returned to Canada for training and reorganization as part of a planned Allied invasion of Japan (Operation Downfall).

The RCAF disbanded No. 8 OTU on July 31, 1945, and created No. 6614 Wing at RCAF Station Greenwood the following day on August 1, 1945, with plans for the bomber wing to start training August 24, 1945 and deploy its first Lancaster crews to the Pacific Theatre by December 1945. The atomic bombings of Hiroshima and Nagasaki and subsequent capitulation of Japan on August 14, 1945, resulted in No. 6614 Wing disbanding as part of Tiger Force on September 5, 1945.

== Cold War ==
Between the fall of 1945 and March 31, 1946, RCAF Station Greenwood maintained a nominal training complement of personnel and aircraft. Effective May 1, 1946, the base was mothballed with numerous buildings being closed. By the end of June the base was down to a skeleton staff of 72 personnel. RCAF Station Greenwood would remain this way until February 17, 1947.

On that date the RCAF's AFHQ Organization Order 854 was executed which activated RCAF Station Greenwood on April 1 of that year. RCAF 10 Group, Halifax announced in mid-October 1947 that No. 103 Rescue Unit would move from RCAF Station Dartmouth (now CFB Shearwater) to Greenwood by the end of the month. No. 103 RU had been conceived in January 1947 at RCAF Station Dartmouth to aid aircraft in distress on Trans-Atlantic service.

By October 29, 1947, 100-150 airmen and officers, 2 PBY Canso, 1 Noorduyn Norseman, and 1 Sikorsky S-51 helicopter. In September 1948, the No. 103 RU at RCAF Station Greenwood deployed a Lancaster and Canso to Goose Air Base to work with Royal Canadian Navy (RCN) units on a northern exercise, followed in October 1948 with participation in joint naval manoeuvres with the RCN and United States Navy (USN).

The Cold War was in its infancy during the late 1940s when Canada signed the North Atlantic Treaty with the western war-time Allies, becoming part of NATO. RCAF Station Greenwood was selected as Canada's site for a maritime reconnaissance training unit for anti-submarine warfare, the No. 2 Maritime (M) Operational Training Unit, and the nation's first operational squadron, 405 Squadron.

2 (M) OTU became operational on December 12, 1949, the same day that 405 Squadron reactivated, using modified Avro Lancaster bombers as maritime reconnaissance aircraft. Part of 2 (M) OTU became 404 Squadron, the base's second operational maritime reconnaissance squadron on April 30, 1951, with the 2 (M) OTU continuing to train units at RCAF Station Greenwood.

The base was experiencing a crowding problem, thus the 2 (M) OTU was moved to RCAF Station Summerside in Prince Edward Island effective November 14, 1953. The Lockheed P2V Neptune replaced Greenwood's Lancasters beginning March 30, 1955 as the operational maritime reconnaissance aircraft.

On January 17, 1955, the No. 103 Rescue Unit received a Piasecki H-21/H-44, known as a "flying banana".

The first CP-107 Argus arrived at RCAF Station Greenwood on May 1, 1958. The No. 2 (Maritime) OTU at RCAF Station Summerside created the No. 2 (Maritime) OTU Detachment at Greenwood to train Argus aircrews. 405 Squadron became the first operational RCAF unit to receive the Argus in July 1958. On April 15, 1959 404 Squadron received its first Argus and on May 1, 1961, the 415 Squadron was reactivated at RCAF Station Summerside to become the third operational unit to fly the aircraft. The Neptunes at Greenwood were transferred to 407 Squadron at RCAF Station Comox starting in May 1958, replacing the last Lancasters.

== Canadian Forces ==
On February 1, 1968, the RCN, RCAF and Canadian Army were unified into the Canadian Forces, and RCAF Station Greenwood name was changed to Canadian Forces Base (CFB) Greenwood.

That year many decisions were made that reduced duplication among the services, with various units being reorganized, moved, or disbanded. To alleviate further overcrowding at CFB Greenwood, 103 RU was moved to CFB Summerside.

By the mid-1970s, six of Greenwood's 18 Argus aircraft were mothballed and 242 personnel cut from all ranks. By the late 1970s, the Argus was identified as a candidate for replacement and the CP-140 Aurora was selected.

In September 1978, the Maritime Patrol and Evaluation Unit transferred from CFB Summerside. 415 Squadron flew the Argus out of CFB Summerside until the spring of 1981 when the unit transferred to Greenwood and converted to the Aurora.

The first Auroras replaced the Argus at Greenwood and Comox with 14 and 4 respectively. Greenwood received its first Aurora on May 27, 1980, and the last one arrived on July 10, 1981.

The 1989 federal budget cuts to the Department of National Defence identified CFB Summerside as a candidate for base closure. In 1991 the base was closed and the majority of military personnel were transferred to CFB Greenwood, with Summerside's only operational unit, 413 Squadron (successor to No. 103 RU) moving its CH-113 Labrador and CC-115 Buffalo aircraft on June 10, 1991; the Buffalo were replaced by the CC-130 Hercules shortly after 413 transferred.

Further defence cuts and reorganization in 1995 moved the 434 Squadron from CFB Shearwater to Greenwood, bringing its Canadair CE/CT-133 Silver Star and Canadair CC/CP/CE-144 Challenger combat support aircraft to the base. This squadron was disbanded on April 28, 2002.

Later in 2002, 413 Squadron's CH-113 Labrador helicopters were replaced by the new CH-149 Cormorant, a version of the EH-101 helicopter.

On 9 January 2008, Defence Minister Peter MacKay appointed Canadian country singer-songwriter George Canyon to the position of honorary colonel at 14 Wing. In December 2011 Barb Stegemann replaced Canyon as honorary colonel of the wing. Terry Kelly, best known as a singer, songwriter, was appointed as the Honorary Colonel of 14 Wing Greenwood, Nova Scotia in May 2015.

== Present operations ==
=== Canadian Forces ===
Today CFB Greenwood remains Canada's largest operational air force base on the Atlantic coast, based on numbers of aircraft and personnel. The following aircraft types are permanently stationed at the base:

- CP-140 Aurora, anti-submarine warfare/long-range maritime patrol
- CH-149 Cormorant, air-sea rescue
- CC-130 Hercules, air-sea rescue, transport
- CC-295 Kingfisher, air-sea rescue

With CFB Gander and CFB Goose Bay, CFB Greenwood is being used as a forward deployment base for CF-188 Hornet fighter/interceptor aircraft rotating in from CFB Bagotville as part of NORAD's post-9/11 response to concerns about civilian airline security along North America's east coast.

=== Air Cadets ===
CFB Greenwood hosts a Royal Canadian Air Cadets summer training centre known as CTC Greenwood. CFB Greenwood is also the home of 517 Flight Lieutenant Graham Squadron, a local air cadet unit. In 2016, members of the Royal Canadian Army Cadets began attending CSTC Greenwood. CSTCs across Canada are also bringing in Cadets from other branches.

=== Civilian use ===
Until 2005, CFB Greenwood's airfield was home to the Greenwood Flying Club for civilian general aviation. The Greenwood Flying Club changed its name to the Greenwood Flight Centre and operated out of the Waterville/Kings County Municipal Airport, a small civilian airport located 12 nautical miles (22 km; 14 mi) east of CFB Greenwood. Since the closure of the Kings County Municipal Airport in April 2016, civilian operations have moved back into CFB Greenwood. The civilian facilities are operated by Freedom Aviation with separate parking area and access to the airport runways. Use of the airport by civilian aircraft requires registration with Freedom Aviation to operate there or must obtain prior permission. These operations occur under a lease agreement between Canadian DND and the Municipality of Kings and the initial terms are for 25 years.

== See also ==
- Military history of Nova Scotia
- Greenwood Military Aviation Museum
