= Canadian Forces Europe =

Military formation in Europe during the Cold War

Canadian Forces Europe was the Canadian Forces military formation in Europe during the Cold War. The CF assisted other NATO allies in watching the military activities of Warsaw Pact and the Soviet Union.

Canadian Forces Europe (CFE) consisted of two formations in West Germany, Canadian Forces Base Lahr, with the 4 Canadian Mechanized Brigade Group (1957–1993), and No. 1 Air Division RCAF at Canadian Forces Base Baden-Soellingen, which later became 1 Canadian Air Group. Both formations closed in the early 1990s with the end of the Cold War. CFB Baden also held one Battalion of Infantry.

== Canadian Forces Europe 1989 units ==
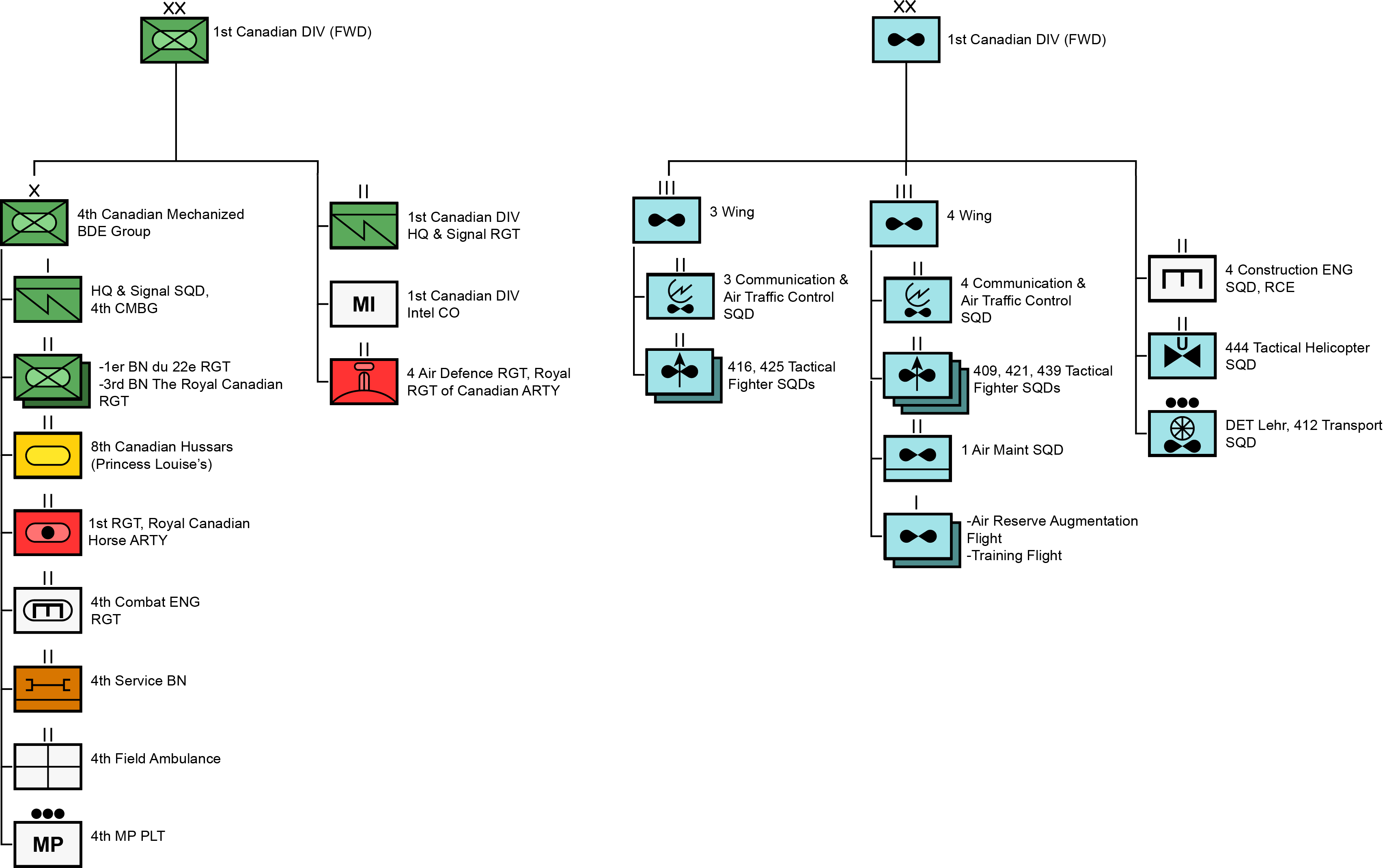
Order of battle graphic of Canadian air & ground forces in West Germany

Besides units of army and air force Canadian Forces Europe also contained a number of multi-service commands and units:

- Canadian Forces Europe (CFE), CFB Lahr
  - Canadian Forces Element, HQ CENTAG, in Heidelberg
  - Canadian Forces Element, HQ 4 ATAF, at Ramstein Air Base
  - Canadian Forces Element, HQ AMF (L), in Mannheim
  - Canadian Forces Element, NATO Airborne Early Warning Force, E-3A Component, at Geilenkirchen Air Base
  - National Support Unit, at Geilenkirchen Air Base
  - Communications Group Europe, CFB Lahr
    - Communications Squadron Lahr
    - Communications Squadron Baden-Söllingen
  - Canadian Forces Network, CFB Lahr
  - Canadian Forces Hospital Europe, CFB Lahr
    - Base Hospital Lahr
    - Base Hospital Söllingen
    - 35 Dental Unit, CFB Lahr
    - Detachment Söllingen, 35 Dental Unit
  - CFB Lahr
    - Base Post Office
    - Base Transportation Section
    - Base Maintenance (Land) Section
    - Base Supply Section
    - Base Construction Engineering Squadron Lahr
    - Base Ground Operations Section
    - Lahr Military Police Section
  - CFB Baden-Söllingen
    - Base Post Office
    - Base Transportation Section
    - Base Maintenance (Land) Section
    - Base Supply Section
    - Base Construction Engineering Squadron Baden-Söllingen
    - Base Ground Operations Section
    - Baden-Söllingen Military Police Section
  - 311 Forward Mobile Support Unit, providing general logistic support to CFE
    - Forward Storage Site, for units that would have been dispatched to Germany in case of war, in Zimmern ob Rottweil
  - Ammunition Depot Lahr
  - Ammunition Depot Söllingen
  - Training Area Langenhard

== Canadian Army ==
Canada had maintained a presence in Europe as part of the NATO forces since 1951, when 27 Canadian Infantry Brigade was initially deployed to Hannover attached to British Army of the Rhine (BAOR). This formation, which was formed primarily with Militia units, eventually moved to a permanent base at Soest in 1953. To begin with, it was intended to rotate brigades to Germany - 27 CIB was replaced by 1 Canadian Infantry Brigade Group in October 1953, which in turn was replaced by 2 Canadian Infantry Brigade Group in 1955, and then 4 Canadian Infantry Brigade Group in 1957. The arrival of 4 CIBG saw a significant reinforcement of the formation's capabilities; prior to this each brigade had only been equipped with a squadron of main battle tanks. The arrival of 4 CIBG saw a full armoured regiment equipped with Centurions and an independent brigade reconnaissance squadron with Ferret amoured cars. In 1959, when 4 CIBG's tour was due to end, a change was made in the reinforcement policy for West Germany. Instead of whole brigades rotating every two years, the decision was made to keep 4 CIBG and its associated brigade units in place, instead rotating the major combat elements to Germany every three years.

The brigade was headquartered in Soest. Individual units were stationed both at Soest and other towns in North Rhine-Westphalia:

- Soest - BHQ, 1 × infantry battalion, service units
- Hemer - 1 × infantry battalion, artillery regiment
- Werl - 1 × infantry battalion, engineer regiment, field ambulance
- Iserlohn - armoured regiment

In 1962, the brigade was reinforced with the addition of the Royal Canadian Armoured Corps helicopter recce troop, equipped with nine Hiller CH-112 Nomad light helicopters. By the mid 1960s, 4 CIBG's manpower totalled 6,700 men; it featured three mechanised infantry battalions, a reconnaissance squadron equipped with both armoured vehicles and helicopters, artillery equipped with both fire support and tactical nuclear weapons, and an extensive logistic operation. The extent of the Canadian operation led to the British describing it as "a light division".

The brigade was renamed 4 Canadian Mechanized Brigade Group in May 1968.

The reformation of 1st Canadian Division in November 1989 followed the Canadian government's decision to end the Canadian Air-Sea Transportable Brigade Group (CAST) commitment to reinforce Northern Norway. 5 Canadian Mechanized Brigade Group, based in Quebec, was thus available for other tasks. The CAST rapid-reinforcement commitment had been encountering problems, most graphically demonstrated during Exercise Brave Lion in 1986, which prompted Canada to start formal consultations with NATO about consolidating the CAST Brigade and 4 Canadian Mechanized Brigade Group, based in southern Germany. The two separate forces would have meant critical logistical and medical support needs would have gone unmet in case of real war.

The headquarters was established, with both 4 Brigade and 5 Brigade under command, at Kingston, Ontario, with a forward detachment at Lahr in Germany where 4 Brigade was based. The main headquarters was intended to move gradually from Kingston to Lahr over a period of time, though this never, in the event, took place.

=== Structure 1989 ===
- Canadian Forces Europe
  - 1 Canadian Division (Forward), CFB Lahr
    - 1st Canadian Division Headquarters and Signal Regiment, CFB Lahr
    - 1st Canadian Division Intelligence Company, CFB Lahr
    - 4 Canadian Mechanized Brigade Group, CFB Lahr
      - 4 CMBG Headquarters & Signal Squadron, CFB Lahr
      - 8th Canadian Hussars (Princess Louise's), CFB Lahr (77× Leopard C1, 20× Lynx, 36× M113, 2× M577, 6× Bergepanzer)
      - 1^{er} Btn, Royal 22^{e} Régiment, CFB Lahr (2× M577, 65× M113, 11× Lynx, 18× M113 TUA with TOW, 24× M125 with a 81mm mortar)
      - 3rd Btn, Royal Canadian Regiment, CFB Baden-Söllingen (2× M577, 65× M113, 11× Lynx, 18× M113 TUA with TOW, 24× M125 with a 81mm mortar)
      - 1st Regiment, Royal Canadian Horse Artillery, CFB Lahr (2× M577, 26× M109A4, 46× M113, 24× M548)
      - 4 Combat Engineer Regiment, CFB Lahr (14× M113, 2× M577, 6× M548, 9× Badger AEV, 6× Biber bridgelayer)
      - 4 Service Battalion, CFB Lahr (4× M113, 2× Bergepanzer, 6× MTV-R)
      - 4 Field Ambulance, CFB Lahr
      - 4 Military Police Platoon, CFB Lahr
    - 4 Air Defence Regiment, Royal Regiment of Canadian Artillery
      - Headquarters & Service Battery, 4 Air Defence Regiment, RCA (2× M 577, 2× M113)
      - 127 Air Defence Battery (detached to 4 Canadian Mechanized Brigade Group), CFB Lahr (12× ADATS, 15× Javelin, 5× M113)
      - 128 Air Defence Battery (detached to 4 Wing), CFB Baden-Söllingen (4× ADATS, 8× 35mm Skyguard)
      - 129 Air Defence Battery (detached to 3 Wing), CFB Lahr (4× ADATS, 8× 35mm Skyguard)
      - 4 Air Defence Workshop

In case of war 1 Canadian Division would have been reinforced by 5 Groupe-brigade mécanisé du Canada and 1,400 men from 1 Canadian Mechanized Brigade Group would have been sent to bring 4 Canadian Mechanized Brigade Group to full wartime strength. 1 Canadian Division would have been assigned to the Central Army Group Commander's tactical reserve, performing operations in support of either II (German) Corps or VII US Corps.

== Royal Canadian Air Force ==
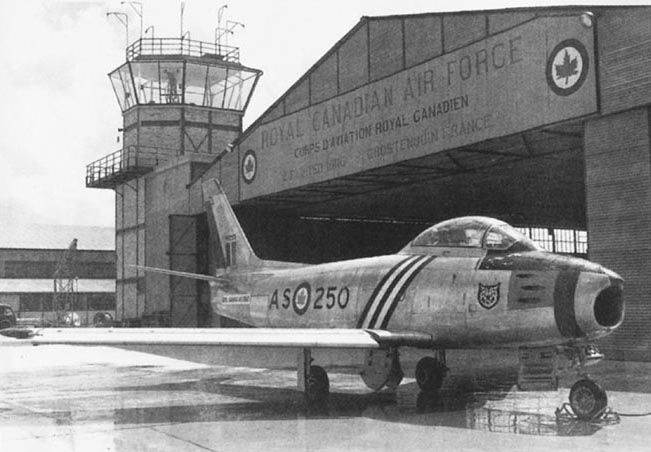
Sabre Mk 5 of No. 416 Squadron at Grostenquin, 1953

To meet NATO's air defence commitments during the Cold War, No. 1 Air Division RCAF was established in Europe in the early 1950s with four Royal Canadian Air Force bases in France and West Germany. These included RCAF Station Marville (No. 1 Wing) and RCAF Station Grostenquin (No. 2 Wing) in France and Royal Canadian Air Force Station Zweibrücken (No. 3 Wing) and Royal Canadian Air Force Station Baden-Soellingen (No. 4 Wing) in West Germany. These wings consisted of three fighter squadrons each.

RCAF Station Grostenquin was closed in 1964 and its units transferred to RCAF Station Marville. In 1967 Marville was closed after France's withdrawal from NATO's military command structure and the units transferred to new RCAF Station Lahr (later CFB Lahr, now Flughafen Lahr). RCAF Station Zweibrücken was closed in 1969.

=== Structure 1989 ===
- Canadian Forces Europe
  - 1 Canadian Air Division, CFB Baden-Söllingen, in war under Fourth Allied Tactical Air Force
    - 1 Wing CFB Lahr
      - 3 Wing Operations
      - 3 Communication and Air Traffic Control Squadron
      - 416 Tactical Fighter Squadron or 441 Tactical Fighter Squadron from CFB Cold Lake, 18× McDonnell Douglas CF-18 Hornet
      - 425 Tactical Fighter Squadron or 433 Tactical Fighter Squadron from CFB Bagotville, 18× CF-18
    - 4 Wing CFB Baden-Söllingen
      - 4 Wing Operations
      - 4 Communication and Air Traffic Control Squadron
      - 409 Tactical Fighter Squadron, 18× CF-18
      - 421 Tactical Fighter Squadron, 18× CF-18
      - 439 Tactical Fighter Squadron, 18× CF-18
      - Air Reserve Augmentation Flight (Reserve Pilots)
      - Training Flight, 5× CT-133 Silver Star
      - 1 Air Maintenance Squadron CFB Baden-Soellingen
    - 4 Construction Engineer Squadron, detached from Royal Canadian Engineers
    - 444 Tactical Helicopter Squadron (detached to 4 Canadian Mechanized Brigade Group), CFB Lahr (CH136 Kiowa, UH1N)
    - Detachment Lahr, 412 Transport Squadron, 2× CC-142 Dash 8
      - 5 Air Movement Unit
