= Cold War tank formations =

NATO and the Warsaw Pact

During the Cold War, NATO and the Warsaw Pact both had large tank formations present in Europe.

The following gives the number of armoured formations and tank strength as of 1981/1982 for Warsaw Pact and NATO member countries. These include formations and vehicles deployed outside Europe, such as North America or the Asiatic USSR.

== NATO ==
Grand Total: 35,000+ Tanks

=== West Germany ===
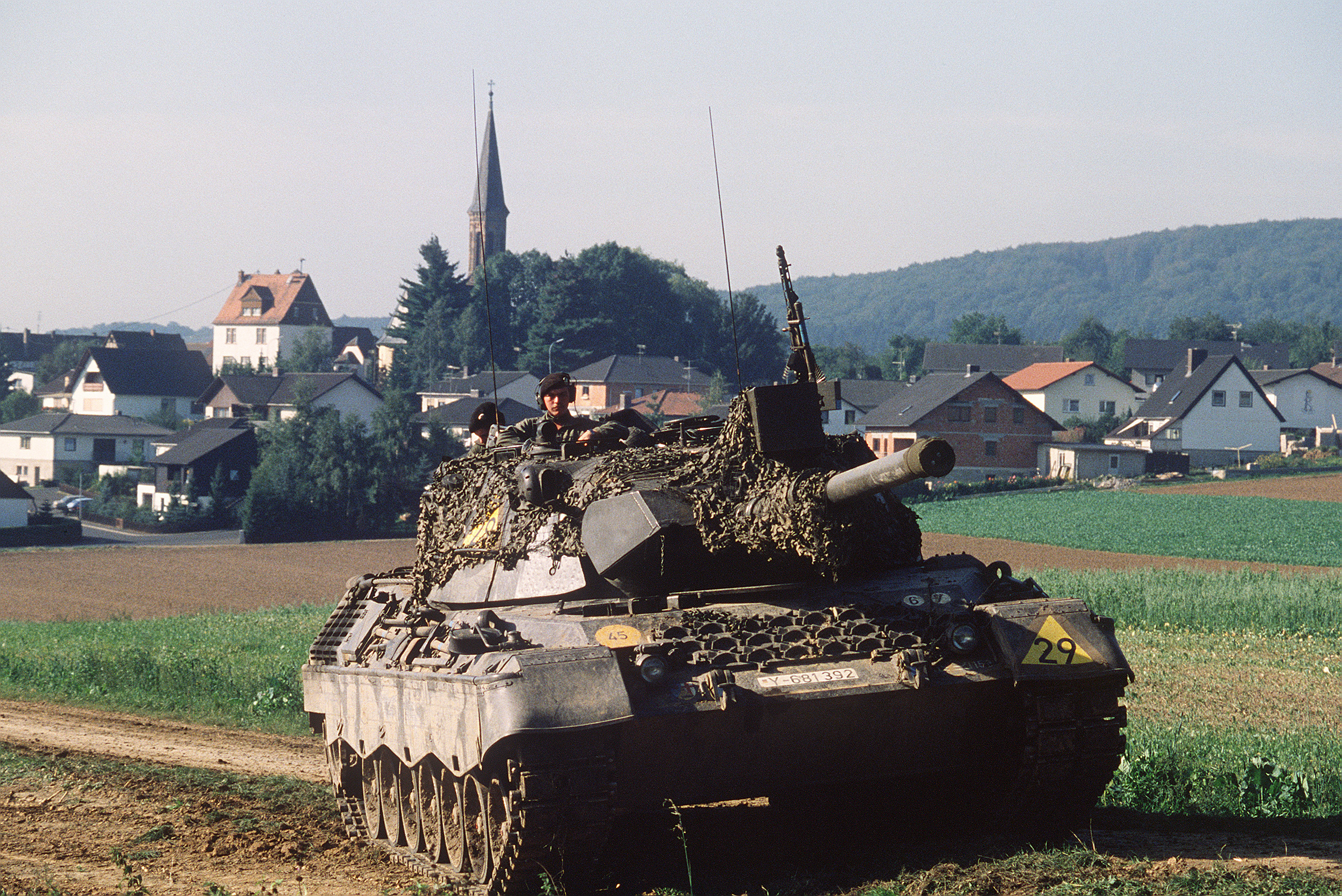
Leopard 1 during REFORGER- Exercise 1983

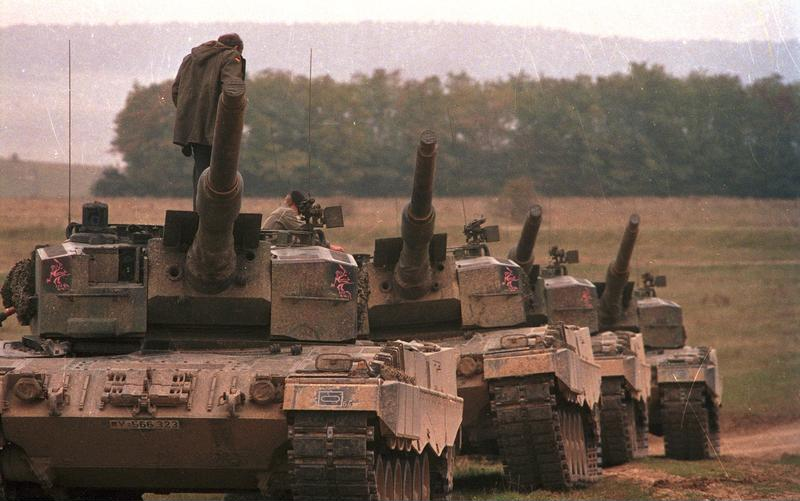
Leopard 2A4

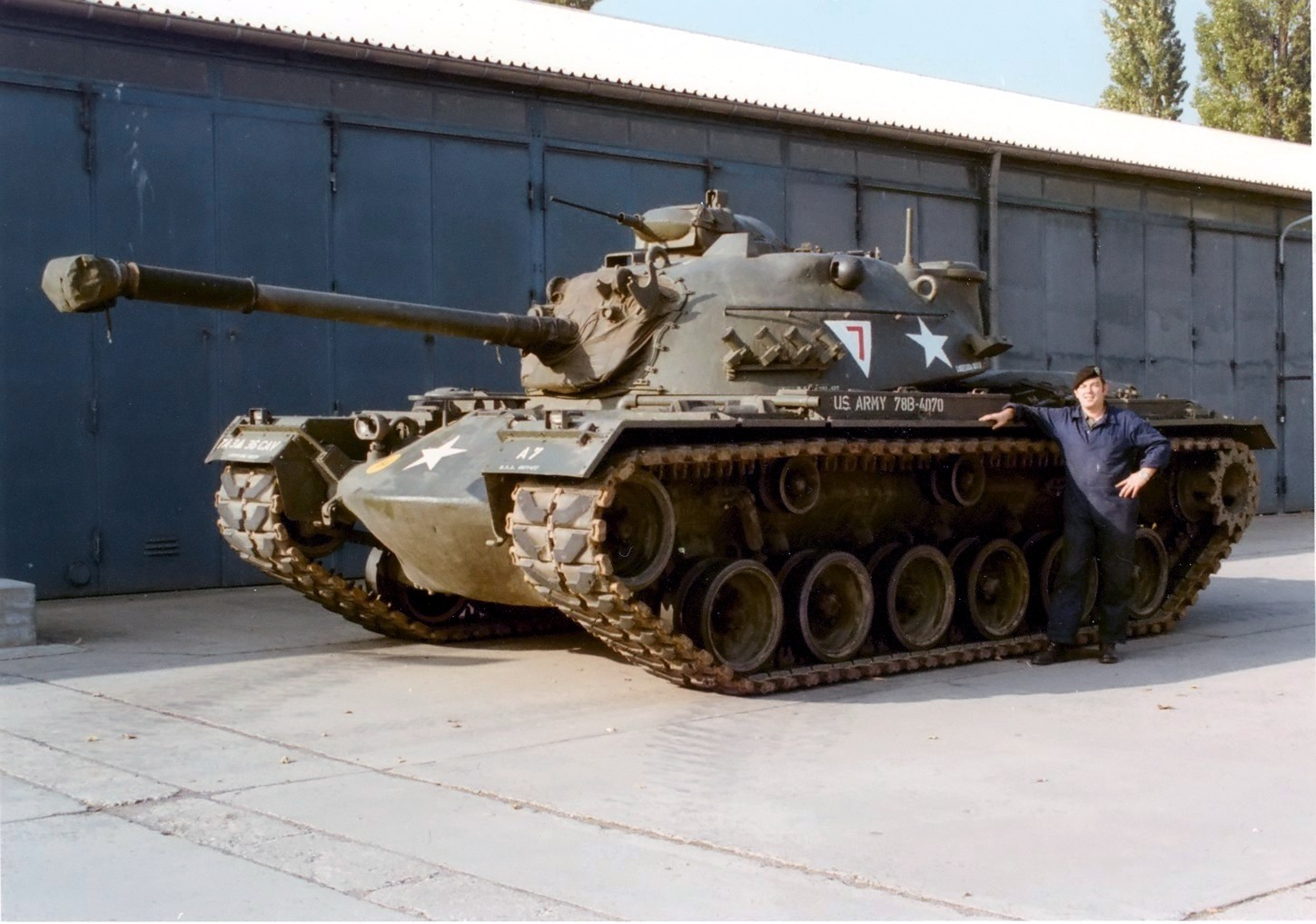
M48 A2C

German Army Formations

- 6 Tank Divisions (Panzerdivisionen) (Mostly had Leopard 2s, but in very little amount.)
- 4 Armored Infantry Divisions (Panzergrenadierdivisionen) (Mainly had Leopard 1s, due to the scarcity of Leopard 2s)
- 1 Mountain Division (Gebirgsdivision)
- 6 Home Defense Tank Brigades (Heimatschutz – Panzerbrigaden) (Armed with older M48A2C/ M48A2G2s.)
- 6 Home Defense Armored Infantry Brigades (Heimatschutz – Panzergrenadierbrigaden (not complete)

Number of tanks
MBTs	In reserve	On order	Other
1,200 M48 A2C/A2GA2; 2,437 Leopard 1 A2/A3/A4; 500 Leopard 2; 770 Kanonenjagdpanzer; 350 Raketenjagdpanzer	–	–	–

Total: 4000+ tanks

(Total: 5000+ including Jagdpanzer)

=== United States ===
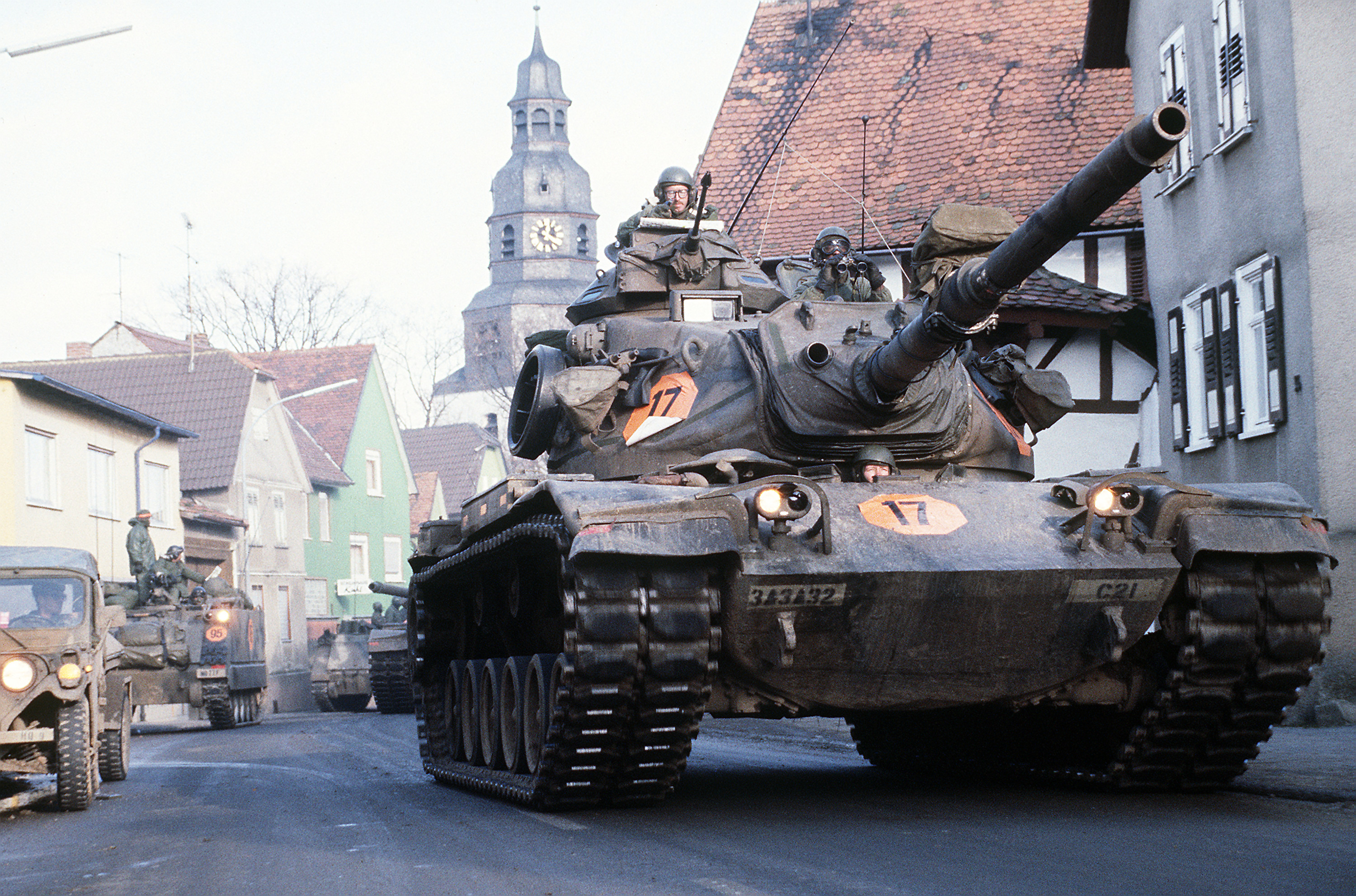
A M60A3 in Langgöns, Germany

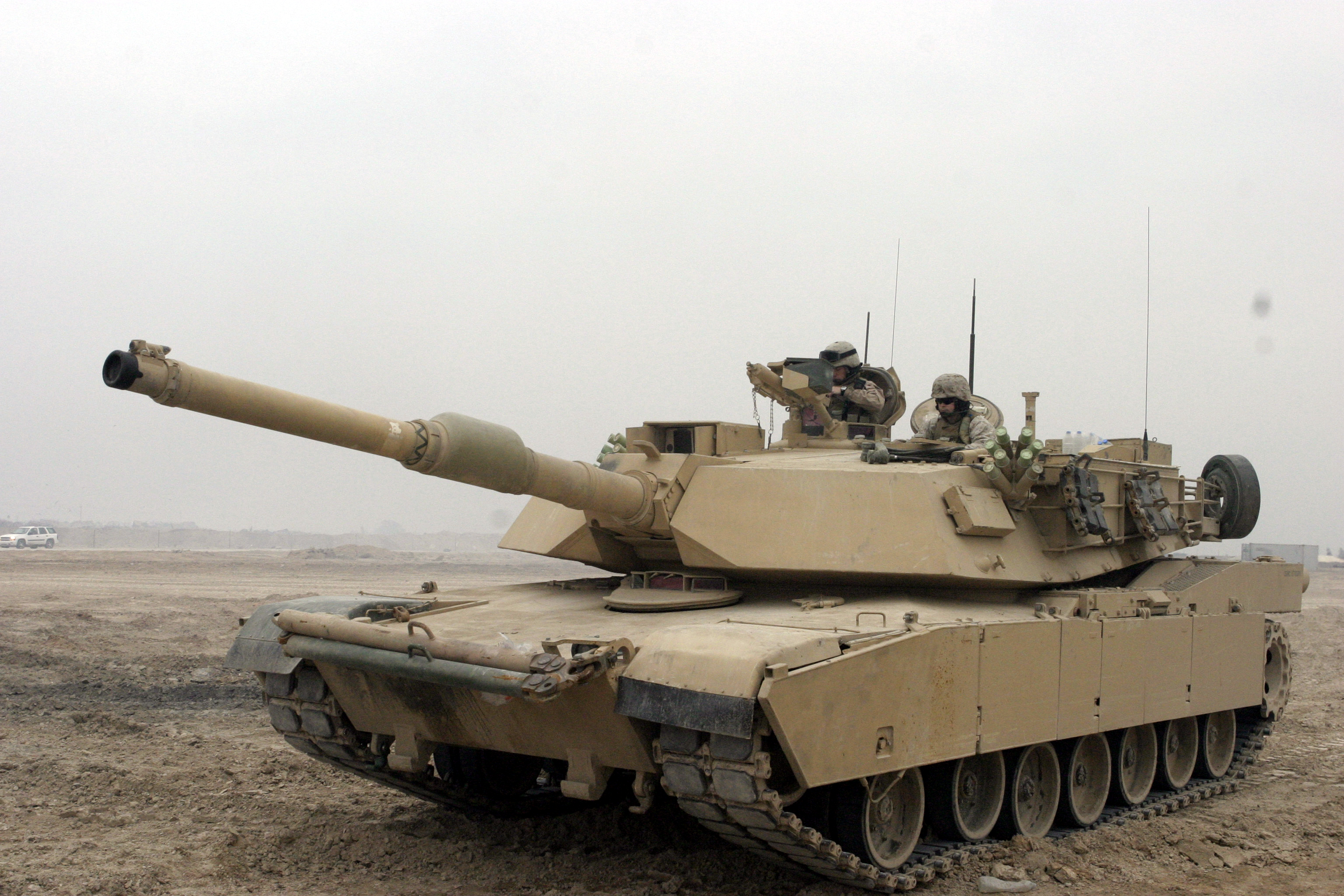
M1A1

Formations as of 1981/1983

- 4 Armored Divisions (1st, 2nd, 3rd, and 4th)(Most of them had M60A3s and each had about 150 M1 tanks)
- 6 Mechanized Divisions (Had mainly M1 Abrams Tanks)
- 4 Infantry Divisions (1st, 2nd, 3rd, and 5th)
- 1 Airborne Division (incl. 1 Tank Battalion) (Had 50 Sheridan tanks)
- 1 independent Tank Brigade (194th Armored) (Had mostly M1s.)
- 4 independent Infantry Brigades
- 3 Cavalry Regiments (Reconnaissance) (Generally only had 10–12 tanks, mainly Sheridans/ but some had M1s)
- 3 ACAV Regiments (2nd, 3rd and 11th ACAV)
- 3 Tank Battalions (most had M60A1 RISE Passive) Marines
- 40 Tank Battalions National Guard (Reserve)

Number of tanks

- 1,825 M48A5 MBT
- 1,555 M60 MBT
- 7,000 M60A1 MBT
- 540 M60A2 MBT (But Reserve on 1976)
- 4,000+M60A3 MBT
- 3,000+ M1 Abrams MBT
- 400 M551 Sheridan AR/AAV (330 extra for training purposes)
- 575 M60A1 ERA MBT with the Marines

Total: 19,225+ tanks (min. 330 for training only)

CENTAG mainly consisted of the US 5th and 7th corps and more mech divisions. The US army had a fair amount of tanks, making up for the shortcomings of NATO tank numbers.

=== France ===
In 1984 :

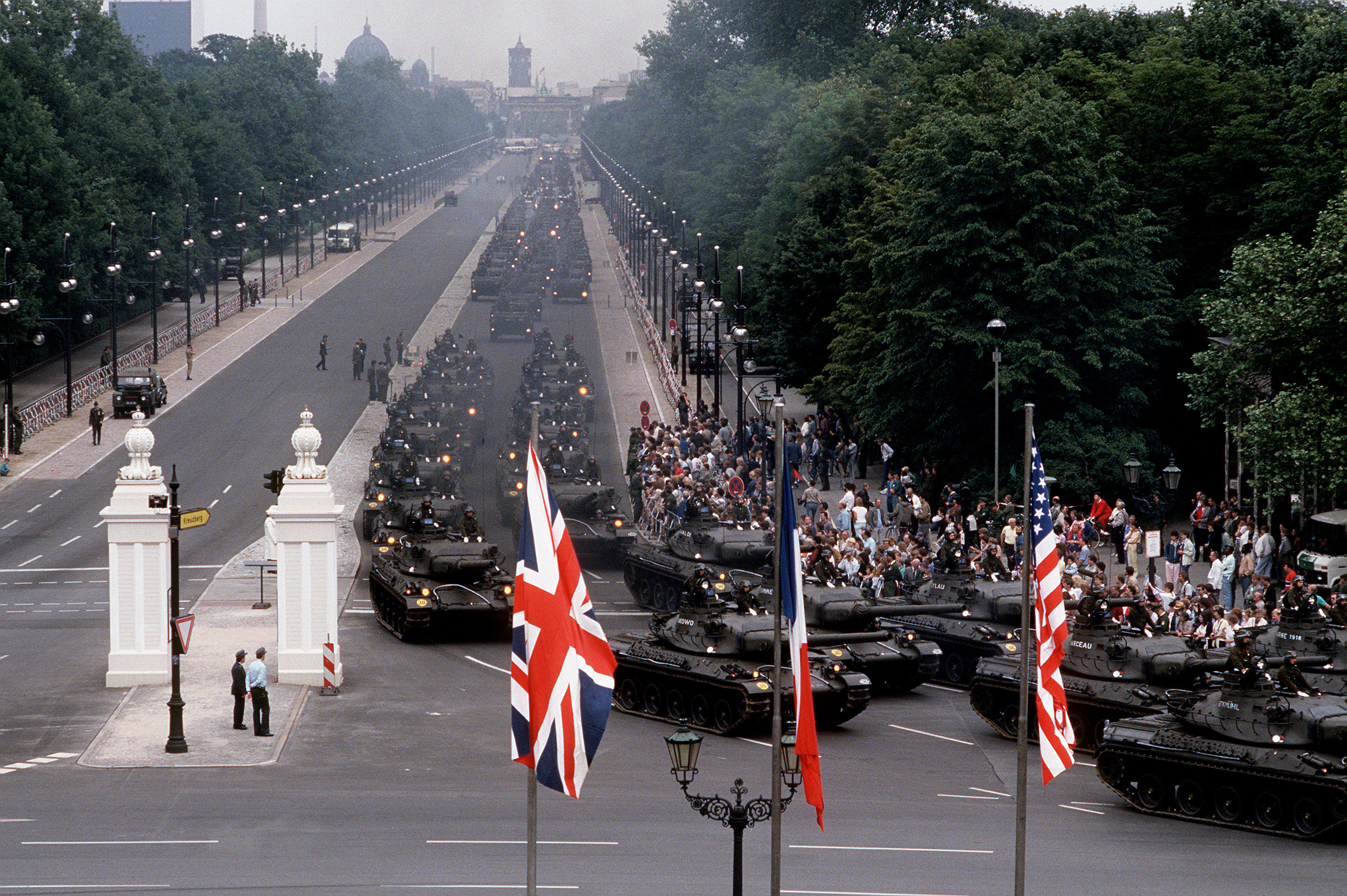
AMX-30 of 11ème Régiment de Chasseurs in West Berlin. 11 June 1988.

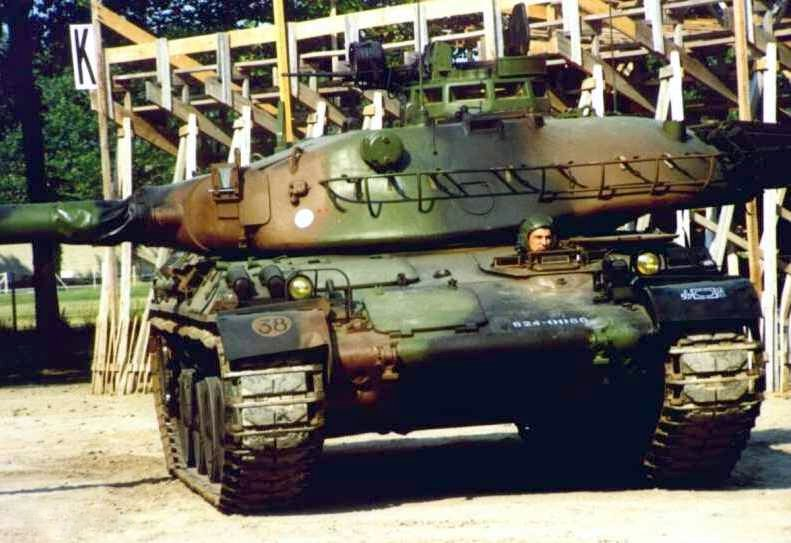
French AMX-30B with the camouflage Central-Europe used from 1986.

Formations

- 6 Tank divisions (divisions blindées – the 2nd, 7th, 10th in France, the 1st, 3rd and 5th in West Germany)
- 2 Light Armoured Divisions – the 12th, 14th

Number of tanks
MBTs	In reserve	On order	Other
1,114AMX 30	–	145 AMX 30	340 AMX 13 light tanks

Total: 1,454 tanks

=== United Kingdom ===
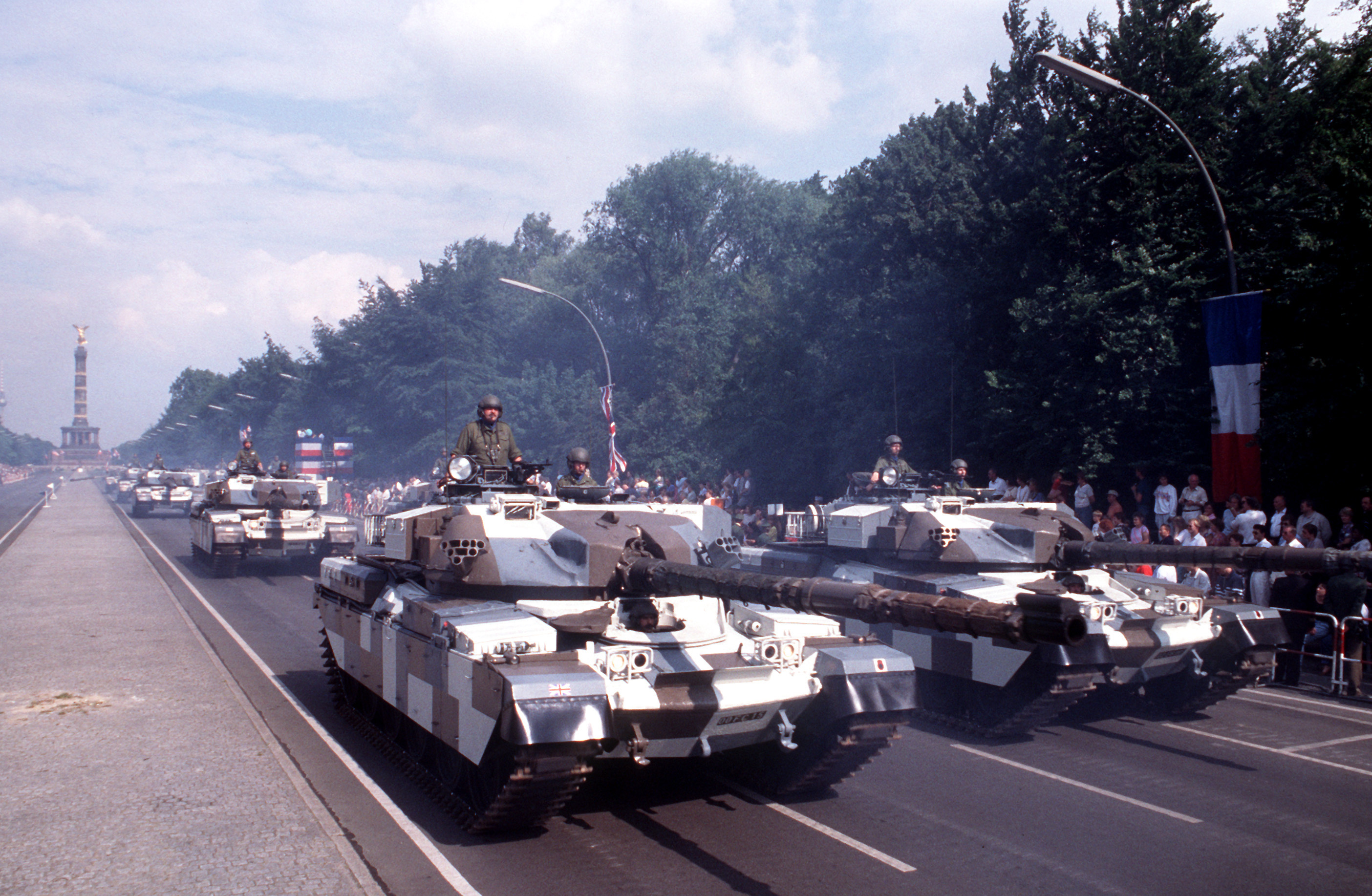
FV4201 Chieftain

Formations

- 3 Armoured divisions in 1981 (1st, 2nd, 3rd and 4th) as part of the British Army of the Rhine.

Number of tanks
Tanks	On order	Other
900 FV4201 Chieftain MBT (60 in Reserve)	420 FV4030/4 Challenger MBT	271 tracked armoured reconnaissance vehicles (FV101 Scorpion)

Total: 1,171 tanks

Before the 1980s, equipment included the Conqueror tank (1955–1966) and FV4101 Charioteer (TA 1950s). Initially containing three armoured divisions, BAOR was reformed by 1960 into three mixed divisions and additional brigade groups. Then in the 1970s, as four smaller armoured divisions before reorganization as 3 armoured divisions in 1981–83.

=== Turkey ===
As of 1981/83:

Formations

- 1 Tank Division
- 2 Mechanised Infantry Divisions
- 14 Infantry Divisions (some with tank battalions attached)

Number of tanks
MBT	In reserve	On order	Other
3,000 M48 Patton; 500 M47 Patton	–	70 Leopard 1A3 MBT	–

Total: 3,500 Tanks

=== Italy ===
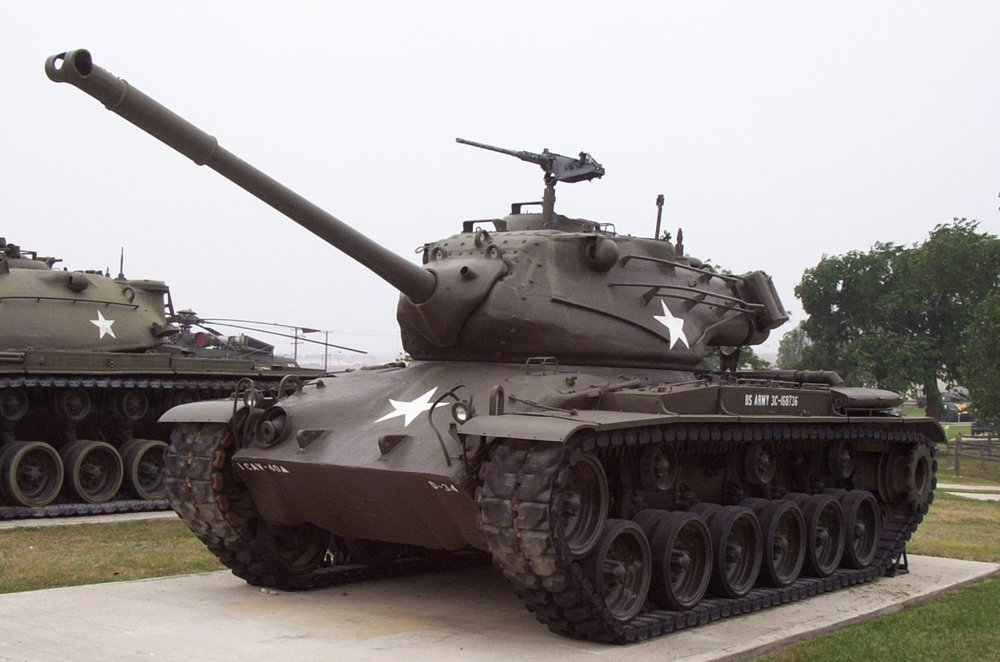
M-47 Patton I

As of 1981/82:

Formations

- 5 Armored Brigades (two tank battalion each, 49 tanks each battalion))
- 9 Mechanized Brigades (one 49 tanks battalion each)
- 4 Motorized Brigades (one armored battalion each, with 33 tanks)
- 2 Armored Carabinieri (gendarmerie) battalions
- 2 Armored independent battalions
- 4 Recce independent battalions (31 tanks each)
- Armored Troops School with the 31st Tank battalion
- Armored Training Camp with the 1st Armored Regiment

Number of tanks

- 900 MBT Leopard 1
- 300 MBT M60A1
- 550 MBT M47 Patton (remaining of original 1,500)

Total: 1,750 tanks

=== Netherlands ===
As of 1981/82:

Formations

- 1 armoured division
- 2 mechanised divisions (1 of which reserve)

Number of Tanks

- 468 MBT Leopard 1
- 343 MBT Centurion tank
- 131 light tank AMX 13/105

Total: 942 tanks

=== Denmark ===
As of 1983:

Formations

- 1 Mechanised Division (Jutland)The Jutland division/Jyske division.
- 1 Light Battlegroup/Jyske kampgruppe. (Jutland) 3 Motorized battalions with 8 Centurion tanks with 105 mm guns and a battalion of 24 105mm light howitzers.
- 2 Independent Mechanised Brigades (Zealand)
- 4 Light Battlegroups (Zealand)Each battlegroup with 8–10 Centurion with 84 mm gun and a field artillery battalion. Plus motorized infantry battalions.
- 1 Battlegroup (Bornholm) Motorized infantry and a battalion of 24 light artillery pieces.
- 1 Battlegroup/Kampgruppe Funen/ 2 motorized infantry battalions. Light artillery battalion of 24 howitzers 105mm.

Number of Tanks

JutlandThe Jutland Division/Jyske division.

- 120 MBT Leopard 1A3 (40 in each Brigade x3)
- 18 light tank M41 Walker Bulldog (Recon Battalion)
- 50 Centurion tank Mk.V with 84 mm gun in the tank destroyer battalion of the division. 10 Centurion with 105 mm gun with the motorized infantry battalion of the Jutland division. 6 × Anti-tank Squadrons in reserve in four regions and one Light-Battlegroupe with 10 centurion with 105 mm gun. In each 3 regions of Jutland there was an infantry battalion. 1 of 3 also with a battalion of light howitzers. Jyske Kampgruppe/Jutland battlegroup with its tanks and artillery was to assist each region if overwhelmed and the strongest force in Jutland. The Jutland division was in Sleswig/Holstein.

Zealand

- 90 MBT Centurion tank MK.V2 with 105 mm L7A1 gun (50 in one Brigade, 40 in the other. All with 105 mm gun)
- 36 Centurion tank MK.V with 84 mm gun (4 tank Squadrons in 4 Light-Battlegroups)
- 18 light tank M41 Walker Bulldog (Recon Battalion)
- Region IV Funen. Battlegroup 20 centurion with 84 mm gun.

Bornholm

- 16 light tank M41 Walker Bulldog (1 Light Tank Squadron and 1 Recon Squadron)
- Possibly a number om M10 tank destroyers, when taking absolutely all reserves into account. I have not listed a number

Total: 350 tanks, (120 Leopard 1, 60 Centurion and 20 M41 for the Military Balance 1981/82)

=== Belgium ===
As of 1981/82:

Formations

- 1 Armoured Brigade (17 Ps Bde – Spich-Altenrath)
- 3 Mechanised Brigades (1 PsInf Bde – Leopoldsburg, 4 PsInf Bde – Soest, 7 PsInf Bde – Marche-En-Famenne)
- 1 Reserve Mechanised Brigade

Number of tanks

- 334 MBT Leopard 1
- 55 MBT M47 Patton (reserve)
- 133 light tank FV101 Scorpion
- 80 tank destroyer Kanonenjagdpanzer

Total: 602 tanks and tank destroyer

=== Canada ===
As of 1981/82:

Formations

- 1 Mechanized Brigade (4 Canadian Mechanized Brigade Group, based in Germany)
- 2 Motorized Brigades (1 Canadian Brigade Group and 5e Groupe-brigade du Canada, both based in Canada with NATO taskings to Europe. 1CBG provided personnel for REFORGER and 5GBC as the CAST Canadian Air-Sea Transportable Brigade Group earmarked for service in Norway).
- 114 MBT Leopard 1
- 195 AVGP Cougar (amphibious, direct Fire Support Vehicle (Wheeled) FSV(W) variant of the Canadian built Armoured Vehicle General Purpose AVGP based on the Swiss MOWAG 6X6 Piranaha hull with 76 mm gun in British FV101 Scorpion Tank Turret).

The Leopards and Cougars came into service in the late 1970s and replaced 274 Centurion Tanks used by Royal Canadian Armoured Corps units (The Canadian Centurion tanks served in Germany for 25 years, from January 1952 to January 1977).

Total: 114 MBT (+195 FSV)

=== Norway ===
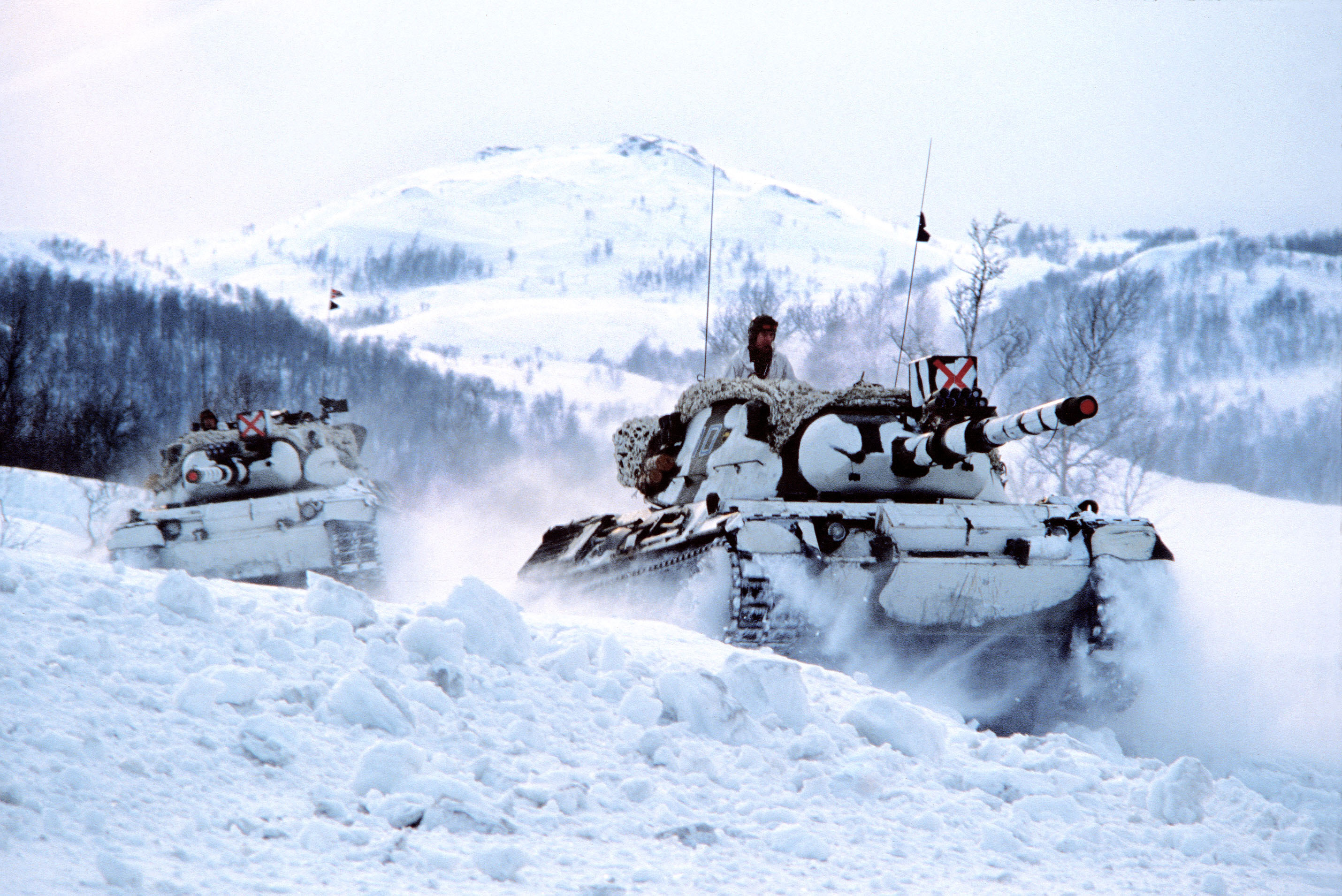
2 norwegian Leopard 1 in the snow as 1982.

As of 1981/82:

Formations

- Independent Armoured Squadrons

Number of tanks

- 78 MBT Leopard 1
- 38 MBT M48 Patton
- 70 light tank NM-116 (upgraded M24 Chaffee)

Total: 186 tanks

=== Portugal ===
As of 1981/82:

Formations

- 1 Tank Regiment
- 2 Cavalry Regiments

Number of tanks

- 34 MBT M47 Patton
- 23 MBT M48 Patton
- 11 light tank M24 Chaffee

Total: ~80 tanks

=== Greece ===
As of 1981/82:

Formations

- 1 Armoured Division
- 1 Mechanized Division
- 3 Independent Armoured Brigades

Number of tanks
MBT	In reserve	On order	Other
230 AMX 30; 810 M48 Patton; 350 M47 Patton; 190 M24 Chaffee; 80 M41	–		–

Total: 1,660 tanks

=== Spain ===
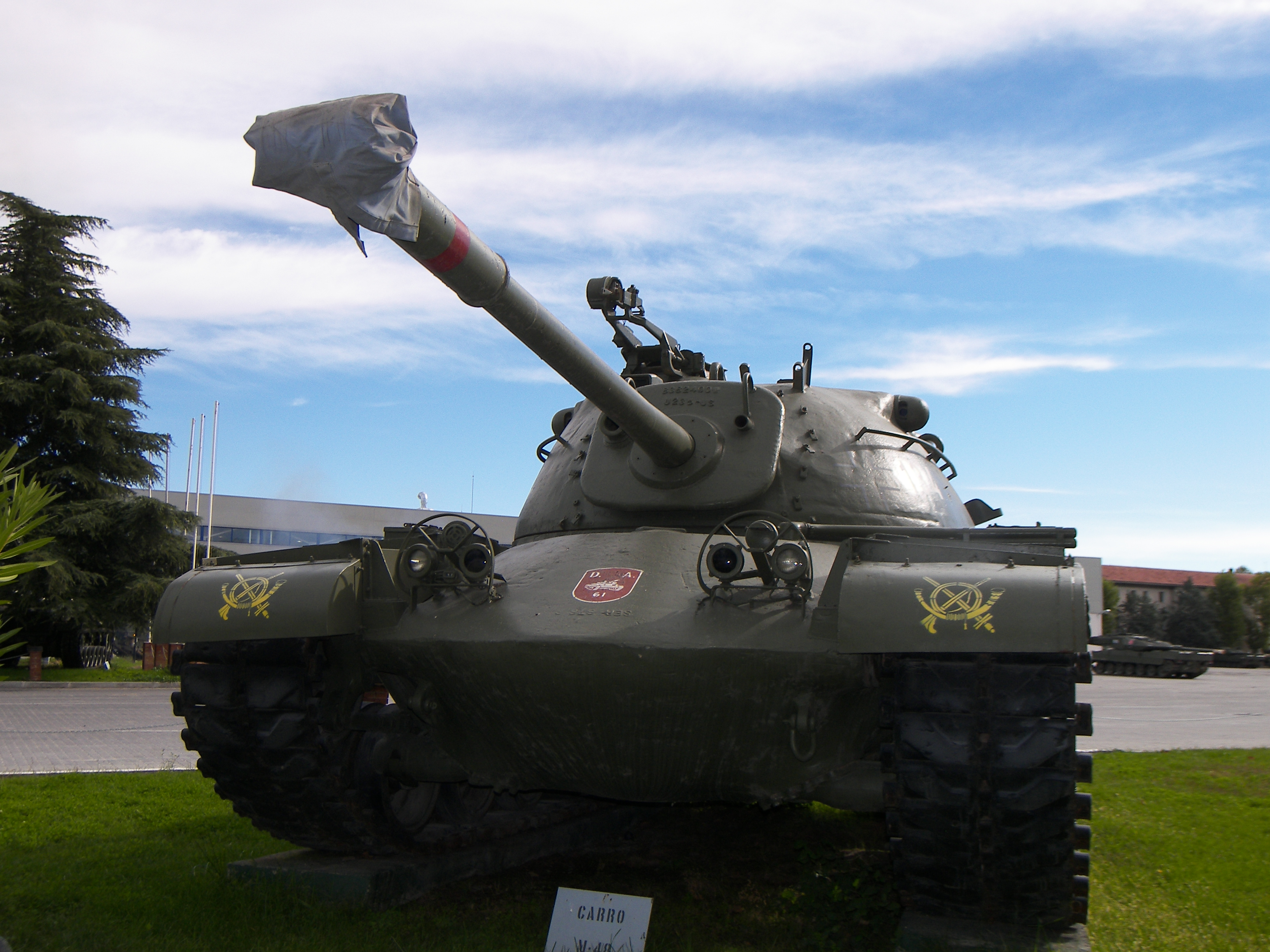
An M48 Patton tank of the Spanish Army on display at the El Goloso Museum of Armored Vehicles

Members of NATO from 30 May 1982:

Formations

- 1 Armoured Division
- 1 Mechanised Division
- 3 Armoured Cavalry Brigades
- 1 Light Cavalry Regiment

Number of tanks

- 390 MBT M47 Patton
- 110 MBT M48 Patton
- 200 MBT AMX-30
- 180 light tank M41 Walker Bulldog

Total: 880 tank, an other 32 M48 in the Marines

== Warsaw Pact ==
Grand Total: 59,100+ Tanks

=== USSR ===
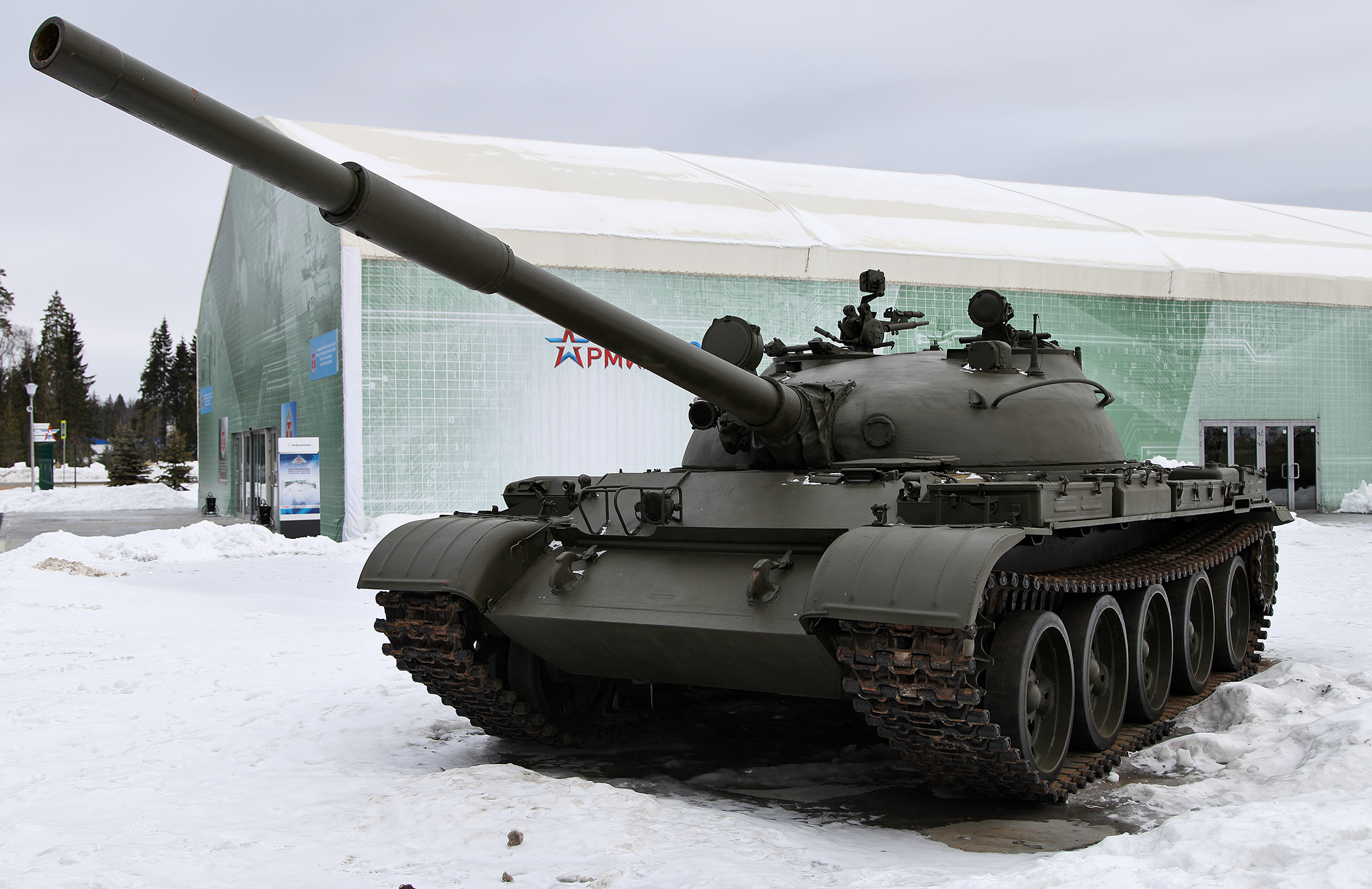
T-62

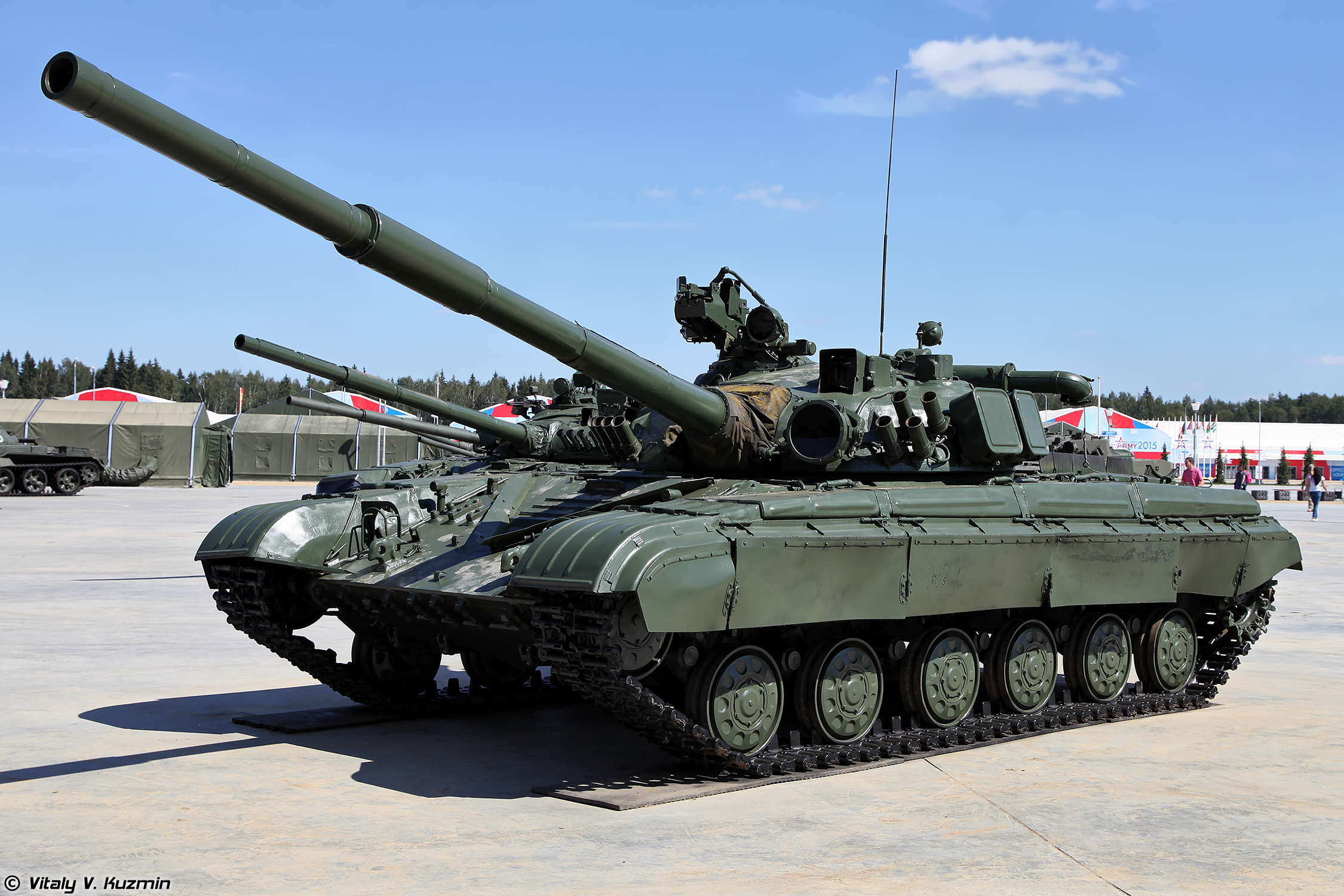
T-64B

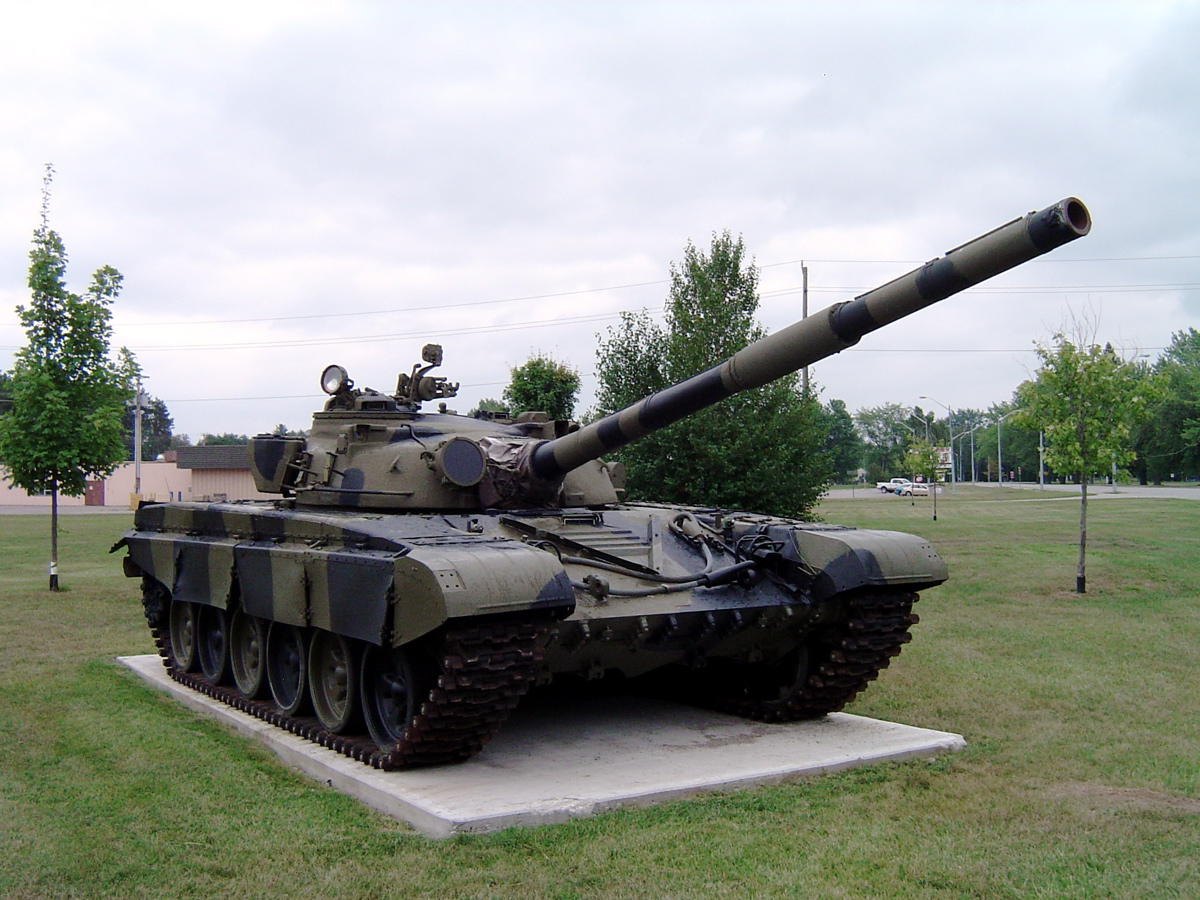
T-72

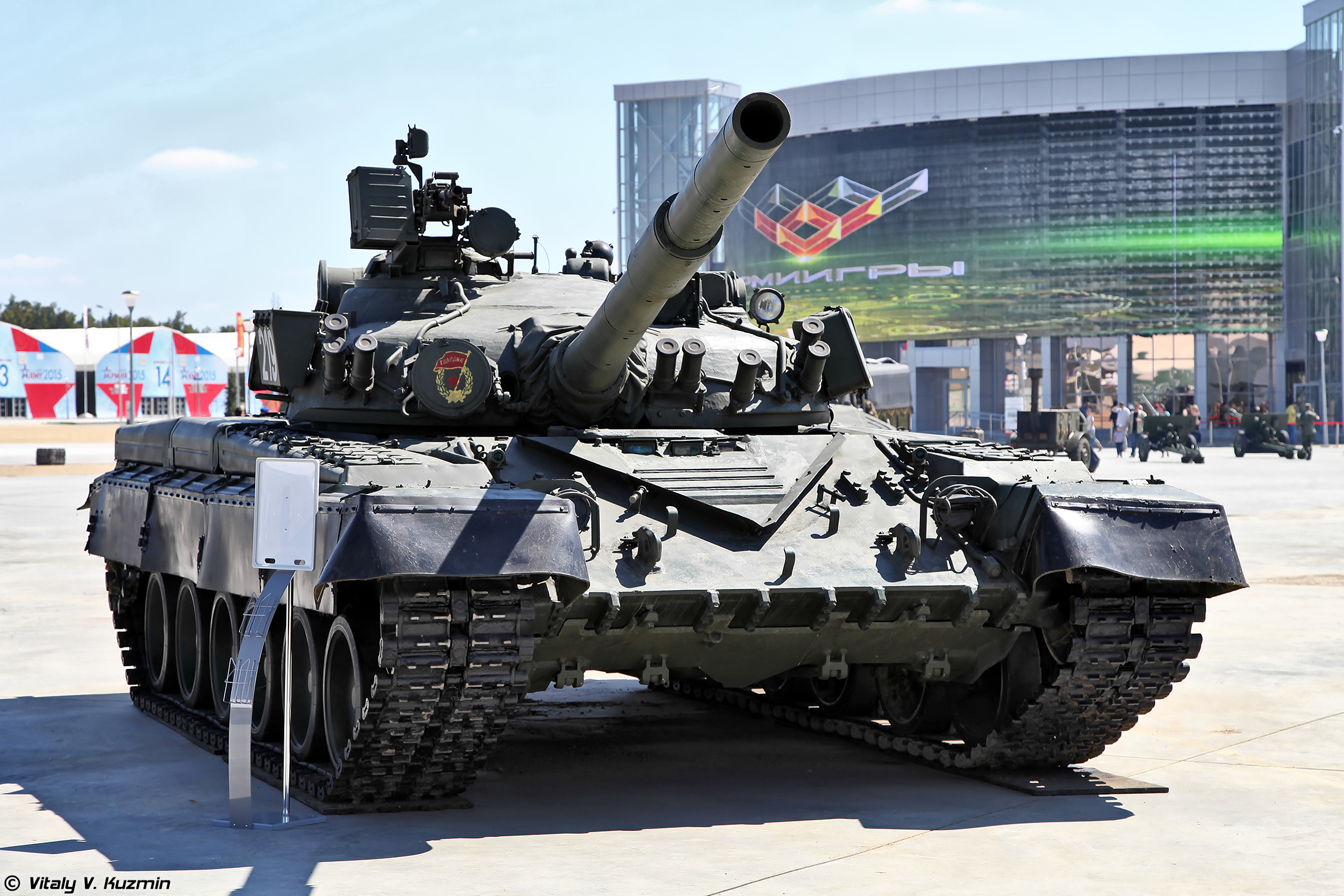
T-80B

Formations

As of 1981/82 the Soviet Ground Forces had:

- 36 Tank Divisions, including six Tank Armies with four tank divisions each.
- 85 Mechanised Infantry Divisions
- 6 Airborne Divisions
- 2 Naval Infantry Divisions
- 3 Naval Infantry Brigades

Tank strength

- 20000+ Medium Tanks, T-54/55 and T-62, 1000+ T-10A/M Heavy tanks (reserve) T-10 / T-10M / T-54 / T-55 / T-62
- 15,000 MBT T64A/B, T-72 Ural/T-72A, T-80/T-80B T-64 / T-72 / T-80
- 870 amphibious Reconnaissance Tanks PT-76/85 PT-76 (Plavayushchiy Tank)
- 1,800 med. tank T-34 (At the Chinese border – most used for driver training; withdrawn in 1979)

Total: 40000 tanks

=== East Germany ===
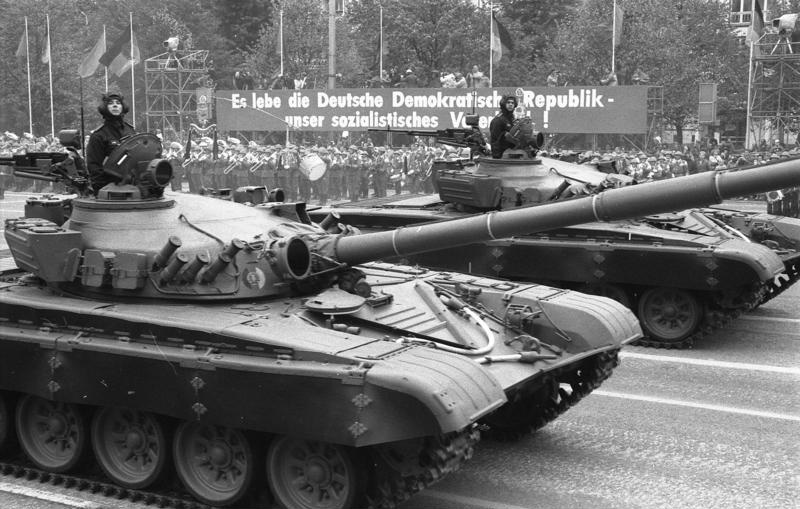
T-72 of National People's Army, 1988.

As of 1981/82:

Formations

- 2 Tank Division
- 4 Mechanised Infantry Divisions

Number of tanks

- 1,500 MBT T-54 / T-55 / T-72 (further 1600 tanks stored)
- 120 Reconnaissance tanks PT-76

Total: 1,620+ tanks

=== Poland ===
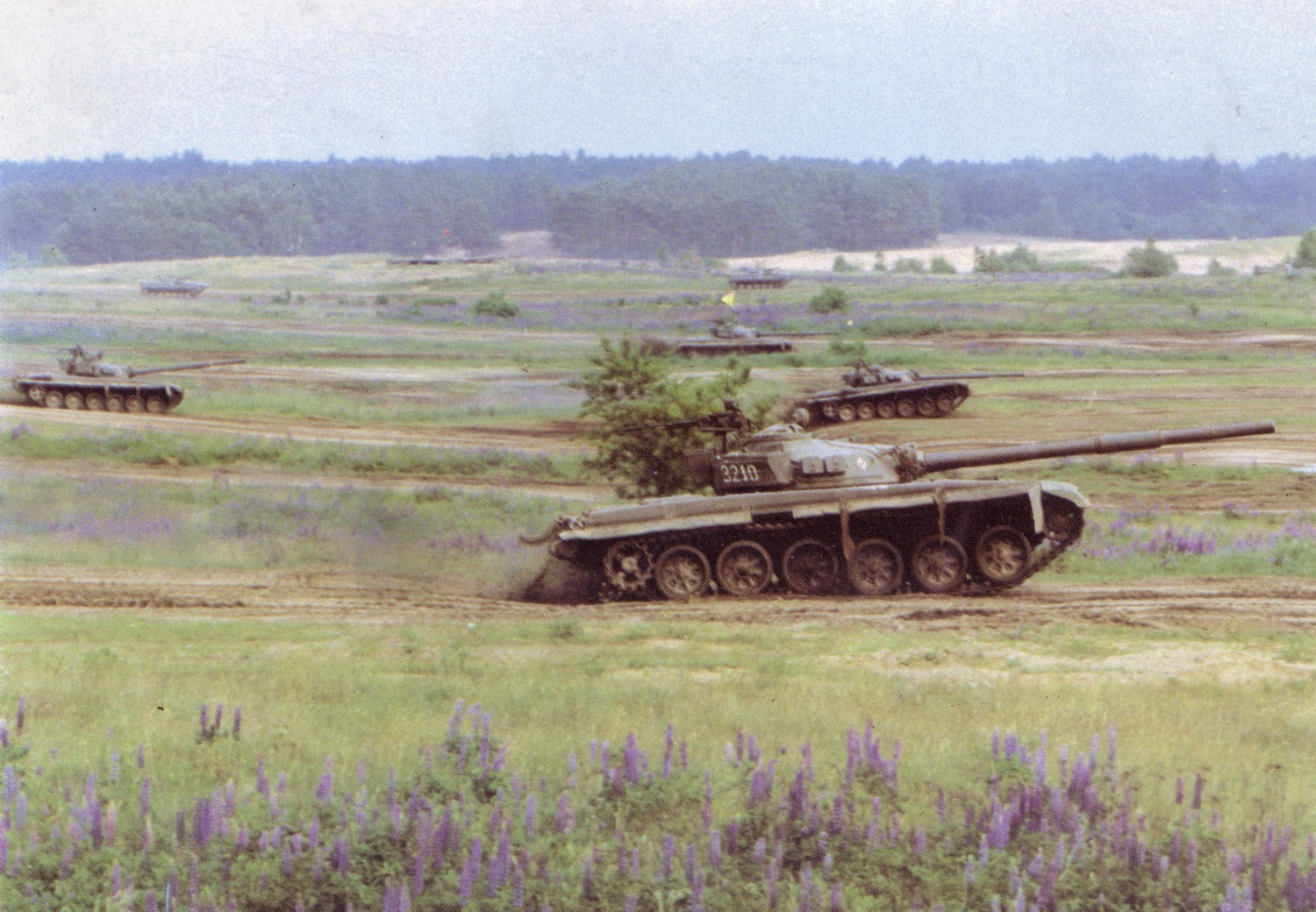
Polish T-72

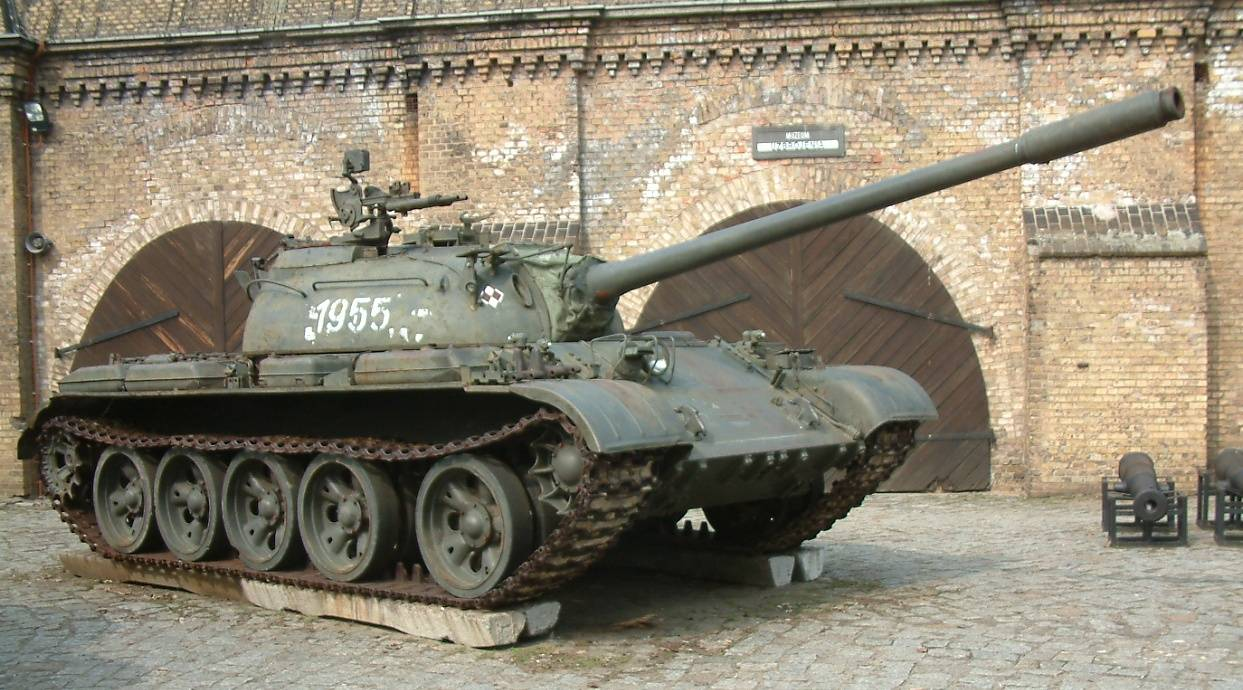
Polish T-55

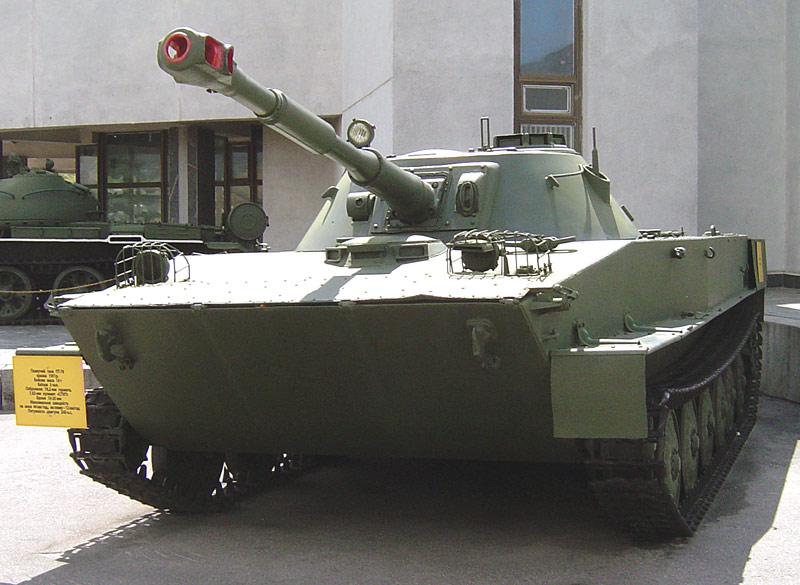
PT-76 amphibious tank

As of 1981/82:

Formations

- 5 Tank Divisions
- 8 Mechanised Infantry Divisions
- 1 Amphibious Assault Division

Number of Tanks

- 3,400 T-54 / T-55 MBT
- 30 T-72 MBT
- 130 PT-76 Armored Reconnaissance tanks

Total: 4,010 tanks

=== Czechoslovakia ===
As of 1980

Formations

- 7 Tank Divisions (2 on full numbers, 3 on reduced numbers, 2 created by mobilization)
- 8 Motor-Rifle Divisions (3 on full numbers, 2 on reduced numbers, 3 created by mobilization)

Number of Tanks as of year 1980

- 31 T-72
- 1,960 T-55
- 1,804 T-54
- 428 T-34

Total in 1980: 4,223 tanks

=== Bulgaria ===
As of 1981/82

Formations of the Bulgarian People's Army

- 5 Tank Brigades (in Sofia, Kazanlak, Karlovo, Sliven and Aytos)
- 8 Motor Rifle Divisions

Number of Tanks

- 1,800 T-54 / T-55 main battle tanks
- 250 T-62 MBT
- 100 medium tank T-34
- 250 light tank PT-76

Total: 2,400 tanks

=== Hungary ===
As of 1981/82

Formations

- 1 Tank Division (in Tata)
- 5 Motor Rifle Divisions (in Gyöngyös, Kiskunfélegyháza, Zalaegerszeg, Kaposvár and Nyíregyháza)

Number of Tanks

- 1,000 MBT T-54 / T-55
- 100 light tanks PT-76

Total: 1,100 tanks

=== Romania ===
As of 1981/82

Formations

- 2 Tank Divisions (in Targu-Mures and Bucuresti)
- 8 Mechanised Infantry Divisions (in Iasi, Braila, Constanta, Bucuresti, Craiova, Timișoara, Oradea and Dej)

Number of Tanks

- 935 medium tanks T-34-85
- 31 MBT T-72 Ural-1
- 758 MBT T-55,
- 121 MBT TR-77

Total: 1,845 tanks

== Other ==
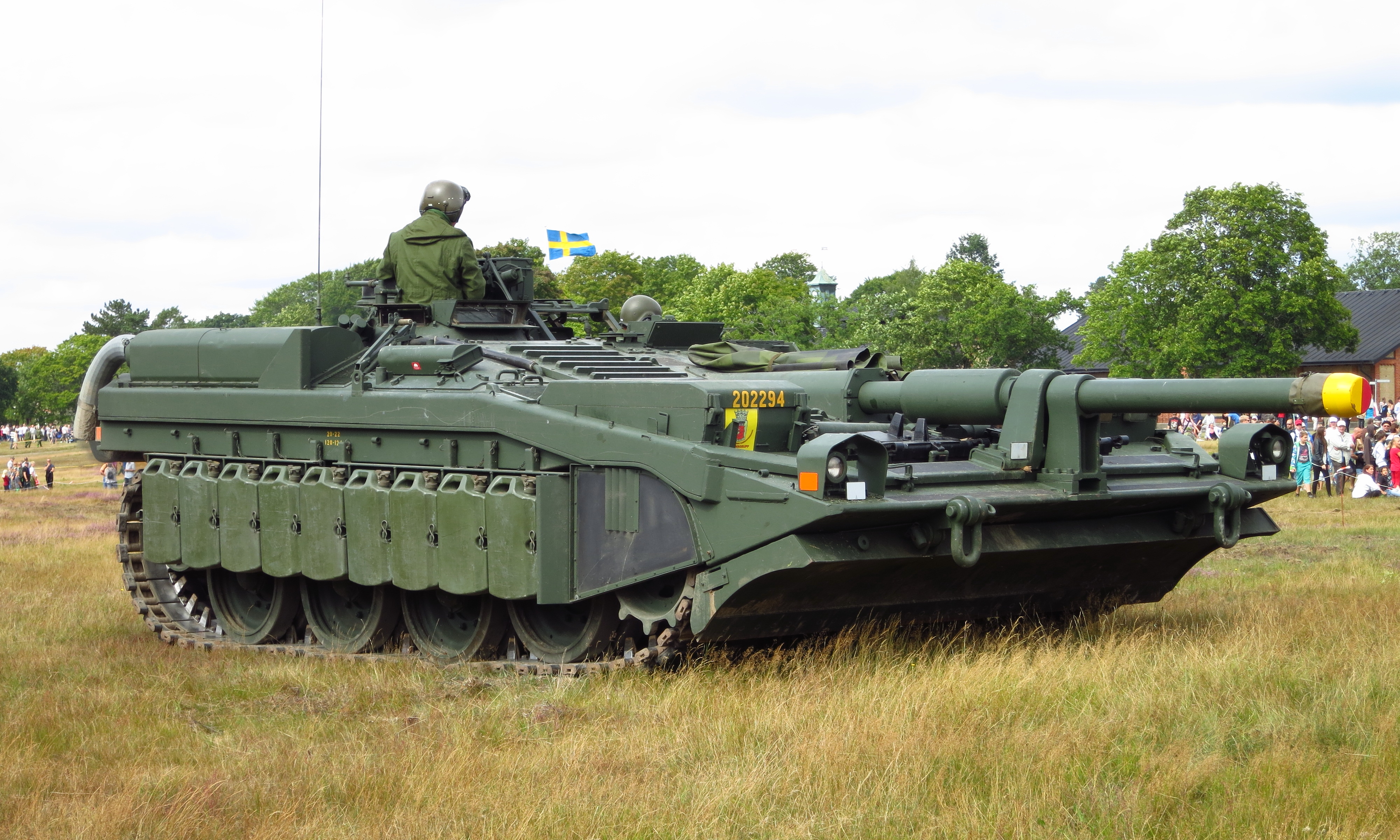
Stridsvagn 103.

=== Sweden ===
As of ca 1980

Formations

- 4 Armoured Brigades, type PB 63
- 1 Armoured Brigade, type Gotland
- 1 Mechanized Brigade, type MekB 10 (under development)
- 2 Independent Armoured Battalions, I 19/P 5

Number of tanks

- 264 MBT Stridsvagn 103 (72 per brigade, plus two independent battalions with 24 each)
- 192 MBT Centurion tank (72 per brigade, plus a future mechanized brigade with 48)

The Swedish army was in the process of forming a mechanized brigade, type MekB 10, which became active in 1983/84. This brigade was only equipped with 48 MBT's (Centurions) compared to the 72 MBT's of the regular armoured brigades, but instead received 24 Infanterikanonvagn 91 infantry support vehicles.

Total: 456 tanks
