= Canadian Forces Base Lahr =

Former military air base in Lahr, Germany

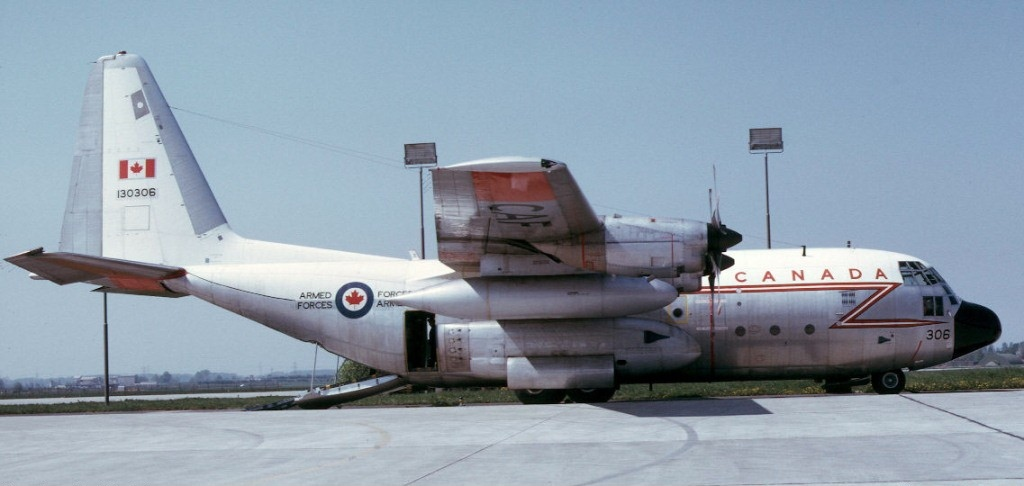
- IATA: LHA; ICAO: EDTL

Summary
- Airport type: Military
- Owner: Canadian Forces Air Command
- Location: Lahr, Germany
- Coordinates: 48°22′9.30″N 07°49′39.8″E
- Interactive map of Canadian Forces Base Lahr

Runways
Direction	Length		Surface
Direction	ft	m	Surface
03/21	9,842	3,475	Asphalt

Canadian Forces Base Lahr (IATA:LHA, ICAO: EDTL, former code EDAN) was a militarily operated commercial airport located in Lahr, Germany. It was operated primarily as a French air force base, and later as a Canadian army base, beginning in the late 1960s. The military base was closed in 1994 and converted to civilian use. It is now known as the Flughafen Lahr.

== History ==
The land that became CFB Lahr was previously the site of a German airship hangar until 1918, which was then occupied by the French Air Force from the early 1950s to 1967.

Canada established a presence at Lahr during the late 1960s with the Royal Canadian Air Force (RCAF) as part of Canadian Forces Europe command.

In the early 1950s, the RCAF had established No. 1 Air Division to meet Canada's NATO air defence commitments in Europe. No. 1 Air Division consisted of twelve fighter squadrons located in four wings. Two wings were located in France (No. 1 Wing and No. 2 Wing) and two were located in West Germany (No. 3 Wing and No. 4 Wing). Eight air division squadrons were replaced by (nuclear) strike aircraft in 1962 in support of Canada's new and controversial nuclear strike role.

In 1963, the Government of France announced that all nuclear weapons located on French soil (NATO or French) would be controlled by France itself. This was unacceptable to the RCAF (and other NATO units stationed in France), so the two nuclear strike squadrons at 2 Wing were hastily moved in fall 1963: 430 Squadron to 3 Wing Zweibrücken, and 421 Squadron to 4 Wing Baden-Soellingen. Remaining non-nuclear armed units in France were repositioned to Marville, and RCAF Station Grostenquin closed in 1964.

In March 1966, the Government of France announced that it would be withdrawing its military forces from NATO and that current NATO units based in France must leave or fall under French military command. This forced the RCAF to look for a home in western Europe for 1 Wing and 1 Air Division Headquarters. They settled on Base Aérienne 139 Lahr, which the Armée de l'Air was vacating as per the French government's announced withdrawal from NATO. RCAF personnel, aircraft and equipment were transferred to the new RCAF Station Lahr by March 1967, with dependents to follow later. The RCAF moved Marville's 439 and 441 Squadrons to Lahr in April 1967. In 1971, the latter squadron moved to CFB Baden-Soellingen and changed its name to 441 Tactical Fighter Squadron.

On February 1, 1968, the RCAF merged with the Royal Canadian Navy (RCN) and Canadian Army to form the unified Canadian Forces. RCAF Station Lahr was renamed Canadian Forces Base Lahr, shortened to CFB Lahr. As part of cuts to reduce costs by consolidation, 3 Wing at RCAF Station Zweibrücken was closed, with its units consolidating at CFB Lahr and CFB Baden-Soellingen.

Further defence cuts and consolidation saw Canadian Forces Europe units based in the Soest area of northern West Germany, along with those units based in nearby Hemer-Deilinghofen, Werl, and Unna, moved to CFB Lahr (some also moved to CFB Baden-Soellingen), with air force units concentrated at CFB Baden-Soellingen. The cuts resulted in a drawback of the air force from six squadrons to three, which were reorganized under the new 1 Canadian Air Group banner.

Army units stationed at CFB Lahr were organized under 4 Canadian Mechanized Brigade Group and were mostly heavy armour, using Centurion tanks, then Leopard tanks, plus armoured personnel carriers and self-propelled artillery, in succession.

CFB Lahr was home to:

- 4 Canadian Mechanized Brigade Group Headquarters and Signal Squadron
- one armoured regiment
  - 1970–1987 - The Royal Canadian Dragoons
  - 1987–1993 - 8th Canadian Hussars (Princess Louise's)
- 1st Regiment Royal Canadian Horse Artillery
- 4th Air Defence Regiment, Royal Canadian Artillery
- 4 Combat Engineer Regiment
- 4 Service Battalion
- 4 Field Ambulance
- 4 Military Police Platoon
- 1^{er} Battalion, Royal 22^{e} Régiment
- 444 Tactical Helicopter Squadron
- 5 AMU (Air Movement Unit)

=== Closure ===
CFB Lahr remained open until the fall of the Berlin Wall, and the reunification of Germany eliminated the need for the Canadian Forces in western Europe. The closure of CF bases in Germany and redeployment was announced in the 1990 budget.

CFB Baden-Soellingen closed its airfield on March 31, 1993, and most units had departed by that summer. The base remained as a detachment of CFB Lahr until it was permanently closed on December 31, 1993.

The last unit to leave CFB Lahr was 4 Canadian Mechanized Brigade Group on August 31, 1993. CFB Lahr was officially decommissioned and closed a year later on August 31, 1994.
