= No. 445 Squadron RCAF =

- Active: 1953-1962
- Disbanded: 1962
- Country: Canada
- Branch: Royal Canadian Air Force
- Role: Fighter operations
- Home base: RCAF North Bay (1953); RCAF Uplands (1953-1956); RCAF Station Marville (1956-1962)
- Nickname(s): Wolverine
- Motto(s): Strike as Lightning

Aircraft flown
- Fighter: CF-100 Canuck

No. 445 Squadron RCAF was a short-lived post World War II squadron of the Royal Canadian Air Force.

The unit was formed in 1953 at CFB North Bay and equipped with CF-100 Canuck. It relocated to CFB Uplands shortly afterwards.

In 1956 No 445 relocated to RCAF Station Marville in France becoming an All-weather Fighter squadron. The squadron was disbanded in 1962 when the CF-100 was retired by the RCAF.
