= CFB Baden–Soellingen =

Canadian airbase in Germany (1951–1993)

CFB Baden–Soellingen Flughafen Karlsruhe/Baden-Baden
- IATA: FKB; ICAO: EDSB

Summary
- Airport type: Military
- Operator: Canadian Forces
- Location: Rheinmünster, Germany
- Elevation AMSL: 408 ft / 124 m
- Coordinates: 48°46′45.7″N 08°04′49.8″E
- Interactive map of CFB Baden–Soellingen

Runways
Direction	Length		Surface
Direction	ft	m	Surface
03/21	10,800	3,300	Asphalt

Canadian Forces Base Baden–Soellingen or CFB Baden–Soellingen, formerly known as RCAF Station Baden–Soellingen (Baden), (IATA:FKB, ICAO: EDSB, former code EDAL) was a Canadian Forces base located near the farming community of Söllingen, part of the municipality of Rheinmünster in the West German state of Baden-Württemberg. It is now a commercial area called Baden Airpark, which also includes the regional airport Flughafen Karlsruhe/Baden-Baden.

== History ==
To meet NATO's air defence commitments during the Cold War, No. 1 Air Division RCAF was established in Europe in the early 1950s with four Royal Canadian Air Force (RCAF) bases in France and West Germany. These included RCAF Station Marville (No. 1 Wing) and RCAF Station Grostenquin (No. 2 Wing) in France and RCAF Station Zweibrücken (No. 3 Wing) and RCAF Station Baden–Soellingen in West Germany. These wings consisted of three fighter squadrons each.

Construction of the airfield at Baden–Soellingen began in December 1951 at a location between the Black Forest and the River Rhine under the supervision of the Armée de l'Air (French Air Force) (AA). The runway and associated facilities were completed by June 1952 and were intended to accommodate a brigade of the AA which arrived in August for the first operational use of the base. At that point support buildings were under construction.

=== RCAF Station Baden–Soellingen ===
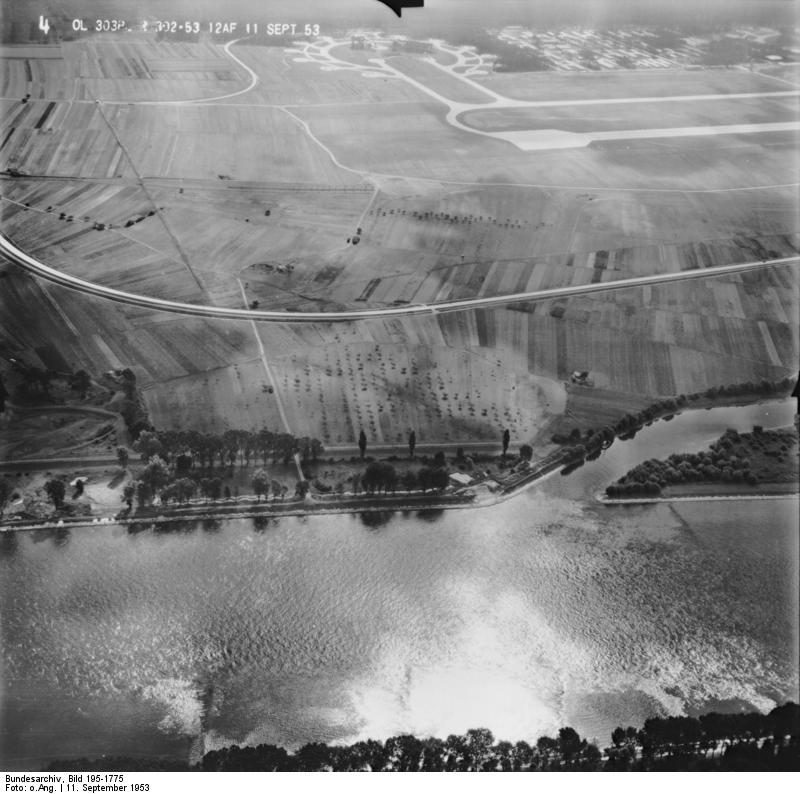
1953 photo showing base runway

In early 1953, NATO headquarters determined that the base under construction at Pferdsfeld, which was originally planned to accommodate No. 4 Wing, would not be ready for arriving squadrons and personnel later that summer. It was decided that France's units would temporarily vacate their airfield at Baden–Soellingen since this base was almost complete. Sixty-two RCAF Sabres of 414 Squadron (414 Sqn), 422 Squadron, and 444 Squadron arrived at Baden on 4 September 1953. Several months after the RCAF units arrived, NATO headquarters made the RCAF move to Baden permanent and the facility was named RCAF Station Baden–Soellingen, with dependents following in the fall of 1953.

Personnel worked quickly to make the base fully operational and integrate into RCAF operations within NATO for the defence of Western Europe.

NATO identified a shortage in all-weather fighter/interceptor aircraft in 1955 and the RCAF responded by providing the Air Division with four CF-100 squadrons to supplement existing squadrons equipped with Sabres. At Baden, 414 Squadron was replaced by 419 Squadron flying CF-100s. Air Division Sabre squadrons were converted to the CF-104 Starfighter beginning in 1962, with the CF-100 squadrons were disbanding by 31 December of that year. The CF-104 units changed the RCAF's original mission from fighter/interceptor to nuclear strike/reconnaissance.

In 1963 the Cabinet of France announced that all nuclear weapons located on French soil (NATO or French) would be controlled by France itself. This was unacceptable to the RCAF (and other NATO units stationed in France), so the nuclear-capable 421 Squadron at Grostenquin was hastily moved in the fall of 1963 to Baden and the similarly equipped 430 Squadron at Grostenquin moved to Zweibrücken. Remaining non-nuclear armed units in France were re-positioned to Marville.

In March 1966 the Government of France announced that it would be withdrawing its military forces from NATO and that current NATO units based in France must leave or fall under French military command. This forced the RCAF to look for a home in Western Europe for 1 Wing and 1 Air Division Headquarters, moving to Base Aérienne 139 Lahr–Hugsweier which the Armée de l'Air was vacating as per the French government's announced withdrawal from NATO military integrated organisation. RCAF personnel, aircraft and equipment were transferred to the new RCAF Station Lahr (Lahr) by March 1967 with dependents to follow later.

=== CFB Baden–Soellingen ===
On 1 February 1968 the RCAF merged with the Royal Canadian Navy (RCN) and Canadian Army to form the unified Canadian Forces. RCAF Station Baden–Soellingen was renamed Canadian Forces Base Baden–Soellingen, or CFB Baden–Soellingen. As part of an effort to remove duplication and cut the defense budget following unification of the services, Zweibrücken AB was closed with its units consolidating at Lahr and Baden.

Further defence cuts and consolidation saw the Canadian Army (then renamed to Force Mobile Command) units of 4 Canadian Mechanized Brigade Group based in the Soest area of northwestern Germany moved to Lahr. However, a mechanized infantry battalion was stationed alongside the fighter squadrons at Baden:

- 1970–1977: 3rd Mechanized Commando, The Canadian Airborne Regiment
- 1977–1984: 3rd Battalion, The Royal Canadian Regiment
- 1984–1988: 2nd Battalion, Princess Patricia's Canadian Light Infantry
- 1988–1993: 3rd Battalion, The Royal Canadian Regiment

In addition, there was also a communications squadron, and after 1975, an air defence battery. A multi-force airfield repair unit formed in the late 80s to fix the runways if needed.

The cuts resulted in a drawback of the air force from six squadrons to three which were reorganized under the new 1 Canadian Air Group banner.

The ramp-up in defence spending during renewed Cold War tensions in the late 1970s and 1980s saw Baden receive much-needed new infrastructure, including updated quarters for its personnel and their dependents. The year 1984 saw squadrons at Baden begin to re-equip from the CF-104 to the CF-18 with 1986 being the final year of operations for the CF-104 at Baden.

In October 1989 the Berlin Wall came down and by the end of 1990 Germany had reunited, thawing Cold War tensions and removing the role for Canada's active units stationed in Western Europe under NATO command.

=== Gulf War deployment ===
In September 1990 it was announced that an augmented 409 Squadron, and an infantry company from the 3rd Battalion, The Royal Canadian Regiment, would deploy from Baden to a base in Qatar as part of Operation Desert Shield along with some airfield security personnel. In December it was announced that 439 Squadron would deploy from Baden to replace 409 Squadron in Qatar. Aircraft from 439 Squadron were involved in air patrols and air-to-ground missions during Operation Desert Storm in January–February 1991, firing the first war shots by a Canadian military aircraft since the Korean War.

=== UNPROFOR deployment ===
The last major deployment from Baden occurred in April 1992, when infantry soldiers from November Company of The Royal Canadian Regiment were deployed to a United Nations peacekeeping mission in the disintegrating country of Yugoslavia. November Company's deployment was the first of many that the Canadian Forces would undertake to the nation under the banner of United Nations Protection Force (UNPROFOR). On the first night in Sirač, Croatia, November Company came under indirect mortar fire and was hit by 10–25 shells. In July 1992, the company was relocated to Sector Sarajevo, and fell under the command of General Lewis MacKenzie. November Company was ordered to break through to and seize Sarajevo International Airport for UNPROFOR to use for transporting food and supplies to civilians in the city.

=== Closure ===
The post-Cold War defence cuts of the early 1990s identified both Baden and Lahr for closure by 1994. The airfield at Baden closed on 31 March 1993 and several of its squadrons were disbanded with their aircraft returned to Canada for storage. By summer 1993 most personnel had vacated Baden with the base becoming a detachment of Lahr, whose personnel had also largely vacated by 31 August 1993. During the final months, Baden operated largely as a detachment of Lahr and was permanently closed on 31 December 1993. CFB Lahr would continue on until being officially closed 8 months later on 31 August 1994.

The Baden Airpark GmbH took over the area in 1995 and commercial flights started in 1997.

=== Notes ===
All Canadian military veterans who served in Germany for more than 180 days were bestowed the Special Service Medal with the NATO-OTAN bar.

A Canadian housing area near the base was named Kleinkanada in German, or Little Canada.

== Notable natives ==
- Douglas Coupland, Canadian writer (b. 1961)
- Ann-Marie MacDonald, Canadian writer (b. 1958)
