= Lahr Airport =

Flughafen Lahr
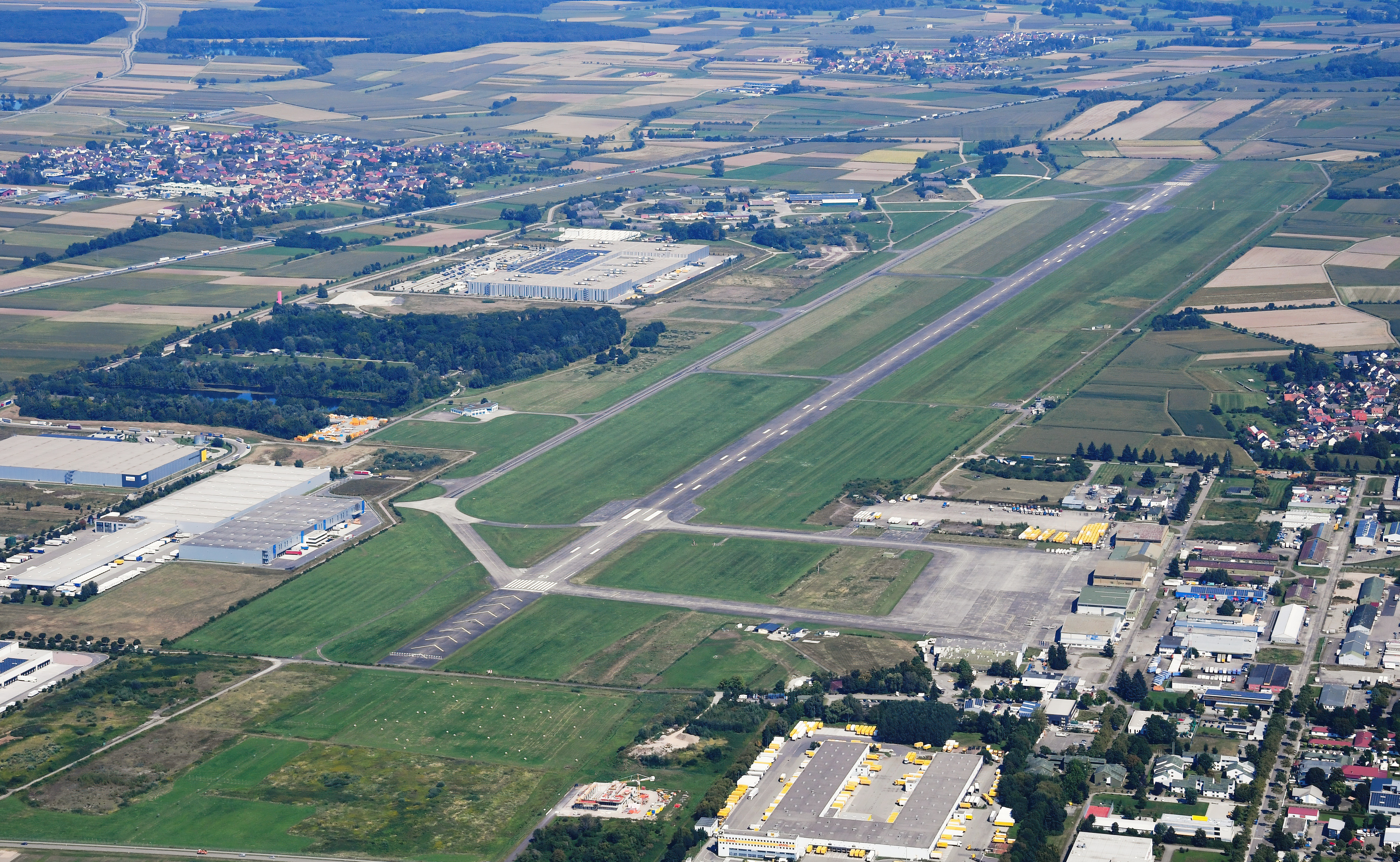
- IATA: LHA; ICAO: EDTL

Summary
- Airport type: Commercial
- Operator: Lahrer Flugbetriebs GmbH & Co. KG
- Serves: Lahr, Germany
- Elevation AMSL: 511 ft (156 m)
- Coordinates: 48°22′9.30″N 07°49′39.8″E
- Website: http://airport-lahr.de/
- Interactive map of Flughafen Lahr

Runways
Direction	Length		Surface
Direction	m	ft	Surface
03/21	3,000	9,843	Asphalt
- AIP at German air traffic control.

Lahr Airport (German: Flughafen Lahr, marketed as Airport Lahr, formerly as Black Forest Airport Lahr) (IATA: LHA, ICAO: EDTL) is a privately owned and operated commercial airport located in Lahr, Germany, situated on the edge of Black Forest in the Rhine Valley. It is used for general aviation and freight transport.

== History ==
The airport is on the site of the former Canadian Forces Base Lahr, a Canadian military base that served as one of the headquarters of Canadian Forces Europe during the Cold War. It was operated primarily as an air force base before the Royal Canadian Air Force was unified with other branches into the Canadian Forces. The military base was closed in 1994 with the end of the Cold War, and the site converted to civilian use. Prior to occupation by the RCAF in 1967 after NATO Forces were mandated to leave France, it had been a base of the French Air Force.

The airport was used as a motorsport racetrack in the 1990s under the name Regio-Ring.

== Airlines and destinations ==
There are no scheduled passenger services at Lahr Airport.

== See also ==
- List of airports in Germany
- Transport in Germany
