= Canadian Air-Sea Transportable Brigade Group =

Brigade of the Canadian Army

- Active: 1968 – 1989
- Country: Canada
- Type: Brigade group
- Role: Rapid reinforcement of Norway in the event of a land war in Europe
- Size: 4,800 to 5,500 soldiers
- Garrison/HQ: RHQ -

The Canadian Air-Sea Transportable Brigade Group, or CAST, was a Canadian Forces battle group dedicated to the rapid reinforcement of Norway in the event of a land war in Europe. The Group was based on a mechanized infantry brigade, supported by two Rapid Reinforcement Fighter Squadrons equipped with Canadair CF-5 fighters and a variety of supporting units. Manpower varied between 4,800 and 5,500 troops depending on how it was counted. CAST formed in 1968 as part of a widespread realignment of Canadian forces in Europe, and disbanded again in 1989 when the Forces were recombined into larger battalion sized group in West Germany.

== History ==
=== Cold War stance ===
The Canadian Army had a continuous presence in West Germany since 1951, when the 27 Canadian Infantry Brigade was deployed under the command of the British Army of the Rhine (BAOR). The number of men continually increased starting in October 1953 with the arrival of the 1st Canadian Infantry Brigade (1CIB), then the 2nd, and finally the 4th in 1957 which included a full armoured regiment.

From that point on, the 4th was left in the field, although the individual units within it rotated back to Canada every three years. The forces were periodically reinforced and reached 6,700 men during the mid-1960s. The British referred to the CIBG as a "light division", and during wartime additional forces would bring the group to full divisional size.

The mission of the army throughout this period was to fight a 30-day nuclear war. The forces were heavily mechanized and supported by a major commitment of the Royal Canadian Air Force's strength, notably its Canadair CF-104 Starfighters and their tactical nuclear weapons. The Canadian Navy was expected to add to the NATO mission of maintaining control of the North Atlantic and thereby guarantee the logistics needed to operate the 4th in combat conditions. Much of the needed command and logistics structure was expected to flow from the BAOR.

In 1968 the various Canadian armed services were integrated into a single Canadian Forces. The 4th was renamed the 4 Canadian Mechanized Brigade Group (4 CMBG) on 1 May 1968, and attached to the newly named "Mobile Command", formerly the Army.

=== Realignment, formation of CAST ===
After Pierre Trudeau's Liberals won the 1968 Canadian federal election, they instituted a sweeping review of Canadian military and foreign policy. As part of this review, and in keeping with the general desire to significantly reduce the size of the Canadian Forces, the active European commitment was halved. 4 CMBG was detached from the BAOR, and repurposed as a reserve of either the US VII Corps or the German II Corps, on the southern flank of the NATO forces. This reduction in role meant that only one battalion remained in West Germany at a time, and that other brigades would not join them during war. At the same time, Trudeau eliminated Canada's nuclear role, eventually removing all nuclear arms from Canadian soil.

These moves drew sharp criticism from the other NATO partners, who complained that Canada was not pulling its weight. In response, the Trudeau government offered a very different mission instead: a new formation roughly the size of the European portion of 4 CMBG would be deployed to Norway given one month's notice by the Norwegian government. They would be able to play a more decisive role in Norway than the same force could in the main battle line in Germany, and the Canadian troops experience in arctic warfare would prove useful. Norway had only a single brigade on active duty, so the Canadian brigade group would represent a major addition of strength. The argument won over NATO command, and the Norway mission was handed to the 5 Canadian Mechanized Brigade Group (5 CMBG) formed up at CFB Valcartier. These units were primarily Francophone.

CAST consisted of three major components; the three mechanized infantry battalions of the 5 CMBG, two Rapid Reinforcement Fighter Squadrons with 10 CF-5 fighters each, an artillery regiment and an armored reconnaissance squadron. In total, CAST contained about 5,500 men in the combined force. Their battle plan was known as Operational Plan BORAL. BORAL relied on the Norwegians supplying the required roll-on/roll-off sealift capability, while Canadian commercial aircraft would be commandeered to move in advanced parties.

In the case of a war, CAST would be joined by similar-sized units from the United Kingdom/Netherlands Landing Force and US's 4th Marine Amphibious Brigade.

=== BRAVE LION ===
Throughout the Cold War the Canadian Army had been organized into a larger force, the BAOR. As a result, its ability to plan and operate large military operations on its own was never fully developed. Several operational exercises in the 1970s demonstrated a real lack of capability in this regard. Additionally, although the forces have been officially unified, there was little actual effort to combine the efforts of the land and air forces under a unified command.

CAST had only operated as a joint unit once in the 1970s, and this exercise took place on Canadian soil. Opposition members and commenters in the Norwegian military and press questioned the ability for Canada to accomplish the CAST mission. These comments eventually prompted the Defence Minister, Jean-Jacques Blais, to formally request that CAST be operationally deployed in its entirety under wartime conditions. The operation would include the entire land force and one of the Rapid Reaction Squadrons with 10 CF-5's, a total of over 5,000 men.

Planning started in the summer of 1984 and it was found the Operational Plan BORAL was sketchy at best - it had never been developed to any sort of operational level. Further, it became clear that "NDHQ planners… were addressing a large scale joint/combined exercise for the first time…" Planning dragged on, and BRAVE LION was not ready for deployment for a full two years, a worrying development for a system designed to be rapidly deployed in a short war. The required sealift capability was not available, and additional commercial ships from West Germany, England and Panama had to be chartered.

By the time the plans were being finalized in early 1986, the Progressive Conservatives (PCs) had long ago taken power in September 1984. They started a sweeping reform of their own, in keeping with the party's desire to reinvigorate the Canadian Forces. As the PCs had questioned the CAST mission in the past, they supported BRAVE LION. They also instituted early moves to realign their European commitment, including dedicating a battalion to NATO's ACE Mobile Force (Land), a mobile reserve force. Ironically, ACE decided to test its capabilities by deploying to Norway and placed a Canadian general in charge of the exercise. The battalion shipped over late in February, before BRAVE LION.

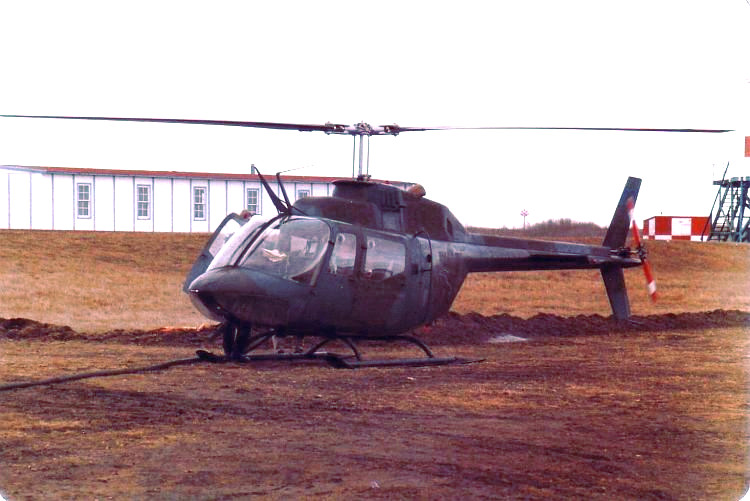
The CH-136 Kiowa was used by CAST as a battlefield reconnaissance and liaison aircraft.

CAST forces finally started assembling in Montreal in August 1986. Adding to the amusement over the process, Soviet ships suddenly docked nearby, claiming engine trouble. The main infantry sections and supporting units were in place in 7 days, but the mechanized forces and equipment were not unloaded until the 22nd day - the majority of time allotted to the entire war (30 days). There was no plan to test or provide for a strategic withdrawal, which many commented would leave the troops stranded.

Militarily, the forces proved entirely capable once they arrived, carrying out operations until they returned in October. The only notable event was the crash of a CH-137 Kiowa helicopter than resulted in three minor injuries. Small portions of the force, notably heavy trucks, were left in Norway to avoid having to ship them in the future.

However, the entire mission structure behind the combat sections was generally considered a failure. Logistics support was cobbled together from several different existing groups, while the extensive logistics experience that was part of Headquarters Canadian Forces Europe was not called upon. Further confusion ensued over the role of the Canadian naval forces in the exercise; planning did not call for any Canadian ships to be dedicated to the mission as they were expected to be part of a much larger NATO antisubmarine effort. However, it was clear that the mission would require naval support, especially if opposed at landing, and such support had never been arranged. Finally, traditional rivalries between the land and air forces led to a division of effort between helicopter and fighter support that was never addressed.

=== Drawdown ===
BRAVE LION was extensively studied by both the military and civilian defence establishments. In the summer of 1982 the then Secret Land Force Operational Effectiveness Study conducted by Mobile Command under the direction of General Bezile sharply criticized the entire concept of sending a Canadian Brigade to Norway. It concluded in part that the CAST Brigade group "suffers important shortfalls in manning, operational stocks and war resources" and further that "there were no comprehensive plans for assembly, deployment and reception". Although couched in technical language, the report made it abundantly clear that Canada had been publicly proclaiming a commitment to an operational task that it had little capacity to fulfill. General Gérard Thériault, a major proponent of forces integration and the then-current Chief of the Defence Staff, stated that Canadian defence policy would be well served by consolidating their commitments in Europe. Thériault's replacement, General Paul Manson, started a review that suggested a number of changes to the CAST organization, but these were eventually ignored.

Manson's efforts were preempted by the major Defence White Paper started in 1984 and published by Perrin Beatty in 1987. Although military spending had increased dramatically in the late 1970s, before the PCs took power, Beatty's paper complained that "if 'rust-out' were permitted to occur, either by intent or neglect, the loss of equipment in the 1990s would by itself dictate a new, greatly diminished defence role". Primary among its capital expenditures were the purchase of an additional six Halifax-class frigates in addition to the six already ordered, a replacement for the CH-124 Sea King helicopter used on these ships, up to a dozen nuclear submarines, new ships to clear mines in Canadian waters (delivered as the Kingston-class coastal defence vessel), and the development of Canadian operated space assets for communication and reconnaissance.

The report went on to complain that the current structure of the forces mean that "widespread land and air force commitments… represent a dilution of valuable combat resources, and cannot reasonably be supported or sustained from an ocean away in the event of hostilities." Given the worrying outcome of BRAVE LION, Beatty suggested shifting the CAST force to Germany to create a single division-sized unit, along with their air squadrons and other supporting units. Norwegian and other European politicians were dismayed by this move, and organized a meeting of MPs from across Europe to discuss it, but to no avail.

Numerous commentators complained that the Canadian mission should have been reversed; instead of moving the brigade group to Germany, where it represented a limited amount of additional firepower, they argued that the German units should be shifted to Norway, where they would cause a significant change in the balance of power. The Soviets normally had two divisions in the area; a full division of Canadian troops, on the defence, would represent a major military force. This point was made early by the Liberal defence critic, Doug Firth, but these concerns were generally unheard given the outcry over the nuclear submarine issue.

CAST was first reduced in size and one of its battalions moved to the ACE Mobile Force (Land), which operated as a mobile reserve across the entire northern European area. CAST ended its active role in 1987, and was formally disbanded in November 1989.

== See also ==
- Military history of Canada
- History of the Canadian Army
- Canadian Forces
- List of armouries in Canada
