= 4 Canadian Mechanized Brigade Group =

Brigade of the Canadian Army

- Active: 1968–1993
- Country: Canada
- Branch: Canadian Army (to 1968); Mobile Command (1968-1993)
- Type: Mechanized Brigade
- Role: main forward deployed land element of Canada's armed forces
- Part of: Canadian Forces Europe
- Garrison/HQ: CFB Lahr

Insignia
NATO Map Symbol
4 CMBG
CFE

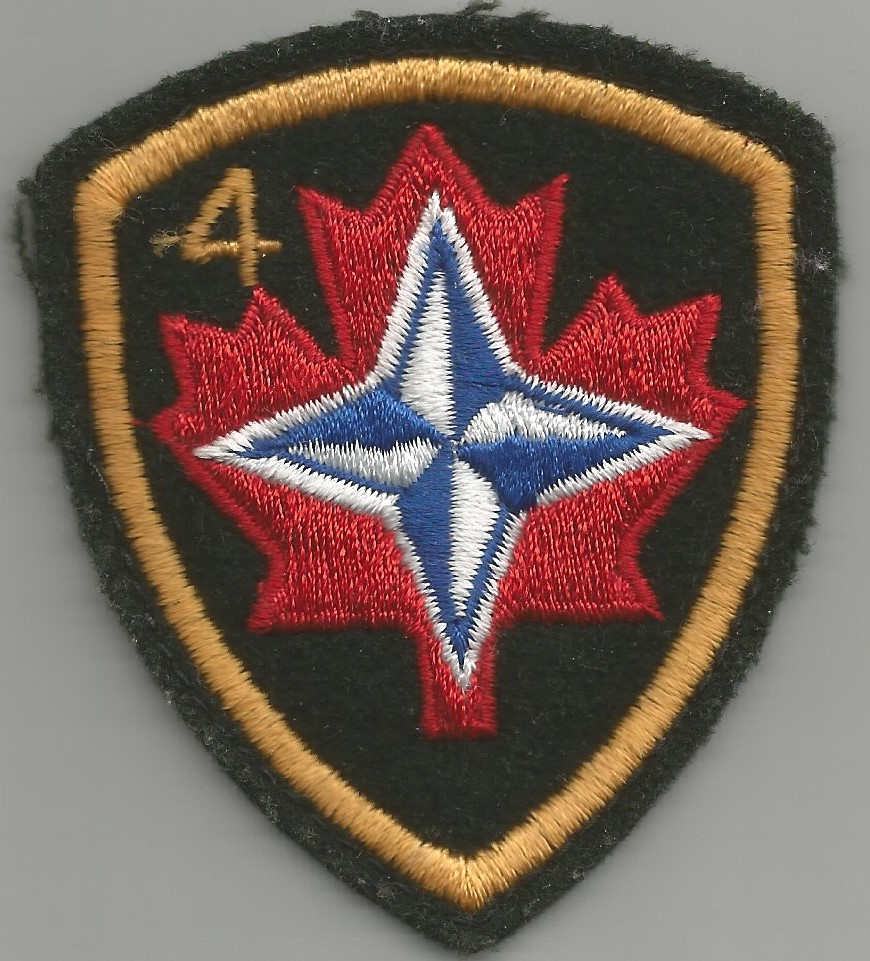
- Shoulder Patch

4 Canadian Mechanized Brigade Group (4CMBG; French: 4^{e} Groupe-brigade mécanisé du Canada, 4GBMC) was a formation of the Canadian Army, then Mobile Command of the unified Canadian Forces. It was part of the European formation known as Canadian Forces Europe. The formation served as the main forward deployed land element of Canada's armed forces, and was stationed in West Germany from 1957 until it was disbanded in 1993.

== History ==
In 1951, 27th Canadian Infantry Brigade arrived in Europe, to be succeeded by the 1st Canadian Infantry Brigade in 1953, then 2 CIBG in 1955, then 4 CIBG in 1957. In 1959, when 4 CIBG's tour was due to end, a change was made in the reinforcement policy for Germany. Instead of whole brigades rotating every two years, the decision was made to keep 4 CIBG and its associated brigade units in place, instead rotating the major combat elements to Germany every three years.

The presence of the three mechanized infantry battalions led Canada's brigade in Germany to be renamed as 4 Canadian Mechanized Brigade Group on 1 May 1968, three months after Canada's three separate armed forces were unified into the single Canadian Forces.

Around the same time, a review of Canada's foreign policy was announced by the Prime Minister, Pierre Trudeau, part of which involved an investigation into the role of 4 CMBG, which was the Canadian military's main overseas force. The ultimate result of the investigation was the announcement by the prime minister, as part of an overall cut in defence spending, to reduce the Canadian military commitment in Europe by half. 4 CMBG would also be re-roled – rather than its attachment as an active part of British Army of the Rhine (BAOR), it would become a reserve attached to either the VII (US) Corps or II (German) Corps, relocating to Lahr in Southern Germany. This downsizing and re-roling led to the withdrawal of the tactical nuclear weapons capability.

4 CMBG operated a large force of Canadian tanks and armoured fighting vehicles and remained in place as one of NATO's Cold War tank formations. When the 1st Canadian Division was reactivated in 1989, 4 CMBG became the forward deployed brigade of the division assigned to the Central Army Group. When the Gulf War began in 1990, the possible deployment of 4 CMBG to the Persian Gulf to serve alongside British Army forces in a Commonwealth Division similar to that from the Korean War was looked at and plans were drawn up to serve as the possible larger Canadian ground contribution in the Gulf (Operation Friction) under the name Operation Broadsword. However, logistical and political obstacles at home resulted in this plan being scrapped entirely and 4 CMBG remained in Germany.

The end of the Cold War brought the final draw-down of Canada's military presence in Europe when the brigade was disbanded in 1993.

== Structure in 1989 ==
In 1989 towards the end of the Cold War the brigade was part of the 1st Canadian Division. It had the following structure:

- Headquarters – Canadian Forces Base Lahr
- 8th Canadian Hussars (Princess Louise's) – armoured (59 Leopard C-1 tanks, 24 Lynx, 3 Leopard ARV (Taurus?), 23 M113)
- 1st Battalion, Royal 22^{e} Régiment – mechanized
- 3rd Battalion, The Royal Canadian Regiment – mechanized
- 1st Regiment, Royal Canadian Horse Artillery – self-propelled artillery and light anti-aircraft (24 M109A2 self propelled howitzer, 15 Blowpipe SAM)
- 4th Air Defence Regiment, Royal Canadian Artillery – motorized anti-aircraft artillery (with Oerlikon 35mm)
- 4 Combat Engineer Regiment – mechanized engineers(3 Biber armoured vehicle-launched bridge, 19 M113 armoured personnel carrier, 3 Lynx)
- 444 Helicopter Squadron – light helicopter squadron (12 CH136 Kiowa))

The brigade also used the Javelin man portable SAM,

== Units serving ==
The following is a list of major combat units serving in 4 CIBG/4 CMBG:

- Armour
  - The Royal Canadian Dragoons – 1957–1959, 1970–1987
  - Lord Strathcona's Horse (Royal Canadians) – 1966–1970
  - 8th Canadian Hussars (Princess Louise's) – 1960–1964, 1987–1993
  - The Fort Garry Horse – 1962–1966
- Infantry
  - 1st Battalion, Canadian Guards – 1959–1962
  - 2nd Battalion, Canadian Guards – 1957–1959
  - 1st Battalion, The Royal Canadian Regiment – 1962–1965
  - 2nd Battalion, The Royal Canadian Regiment – 1965–1969
  - 3rd Battalion, The Royal Canadian Regiment – 1977–1984, 1988–1993
  - 1st Battalion, Princess Patricia's Canadian Light Infantry – 1964–1967
  - 2nd Battalion, Princess Patricia's Canadian Light Infantry – 1966–1970, 1984–1988
  - 1st Battalion, Royal 22^{e} Régiment – 1967–1993
  - 2nd Battalion, Royal 22^{e} Régiment – 1965–1969
  - 1st Battalion, The Queen's Own Rifles of Canada – 1960–1964
  - 2nd Battalion, The Queen's Own Rifles of Canada – 1957–1959
  - 2nd Battalion, The Black Watch (Royal Highland Regiment) of Canada – 1962–1965
  - 3rd Mechanized Commando, The Canadian Airborne Regiment – 1970–1977
- Artillery
  - 1st Regiment, Royal Canadian Horse Artillery – 1957–1960, 1967–1993
  - 2nd Regiment, Royal Canadian Horse Artillery – 1964–1967
  - 3rd Regiment, Royal Canadian Horse Artillery – 1960–1964
  - 4th (Air Defence) Regiment, Royal Canadian Artillery – 1987–1992
  - 1st Surface-to-Surface Missile Battery, Royal Canadian Artillery – 1961–1970

== See also ==
- Military history of Canada
- History of the Canadian Army
- List of armouries in Canada
