= RCAF Station Marville =

Coordinates: 49.45687°N 5.41133°E

RCAF Station Marville (also known as 1(F) Wing or 1 Wing) was a Royal Canadian Air Force (RCAF) station located near Marville in the Meuse department, Lorraine, northeastern France. It was one of four RCAF wings consisting of three fighter squadrons each, established in Europe in the early 1950s to support the goals of NATO in Europe during the Cold War. These wings were part of No. 1 Air Division. Two wings were located in France (RCAF Station Marville and RCAF Station Grostenquin), and two were located in West Germany (RCAF Station Zweibrücken and RCAF Station Baden-Soellingen).

== History ==
No. 1 Wing, Canada's first NATO fighter wing, was initially located at North Luffenham, England since its French base was not ready. The first of the wing's three fighter squadrons (all squadrons flying Sabres), No. 410 Squadron, arrived at North Luffenham in November 1951. The squadron and its aircraft, along with those of No. 441 Squadron, were ferried across the Atlantic to Glasgow, Scotland aboard HMCS Magnificent. The personnel of 441 arrived by ocean liner in February 1952. In May–June 1952, No. 439 Squadron flew from RCAF Station Uplands via Bagotville, Goose Bay, Greenland, Iceland and Scotland, in an exercise known as "Operation Leapfrog."

No. 410 and 441 Squadrons left North Luffenham in 1954 for temporary bases in Germany (410 Squadron was relocated to Baden, and 441 to Zweibrücken). They finally arrived at the completed Marville base in 1955. No. 439 Squadron flew directly from North Luffenham to Marville in 1955.

No. 5 Air Movements Unit serviced flights between Marville and CFB Trenton. A barracks block was used as a transient hotel, called the Lorraine Inn, for personnel and families en route to or from other bases.

In 1956 four CF-100 squadrons were established in Europe for NATO service. This aircraft had all weather and night operation capabilities. One squadron in each wing was replaced by a CF-100 squadron. At Marville, 445 Squadron replaced 410 Squadron. In 1962, the two remaining sabre squadrons converted to CF-104 Starfighters, as did all the other Air Division Sabre squadrons. The CF-104 supported Canada's new and controversial nuclear strike role since it could be equipped with nuclear weapons. The Starfighter also had a reconnaissance role. No. 445 Squadron was disbanded in December 1962.

NATO bases in France, including Marville, were short-lived. In 1963 the Government of France announced that all nuclear weapons in France were to be placed under French control. This was unacceptable to the RCAF (and other NATO units stationed in France), so the two nuclear strike squadrons at 2 Wing were hastily moved to Zweibrücken and Baden-Soellingen while remaining non-nuclear armed units in France were repositioned to Marville. Marville's two remaining squadrons converted to a strictly reconnaissance role. In March 1966 the Government of France announced that it would be withdrawing its military forces from NATO and that NATO units based in France would have to leave or fall under French command. The RCAF then moved Marville's 439 and 441 Squadrons to CFB Lahr in April 1967.
