= Marville, Meuse =

Marville
- Commune
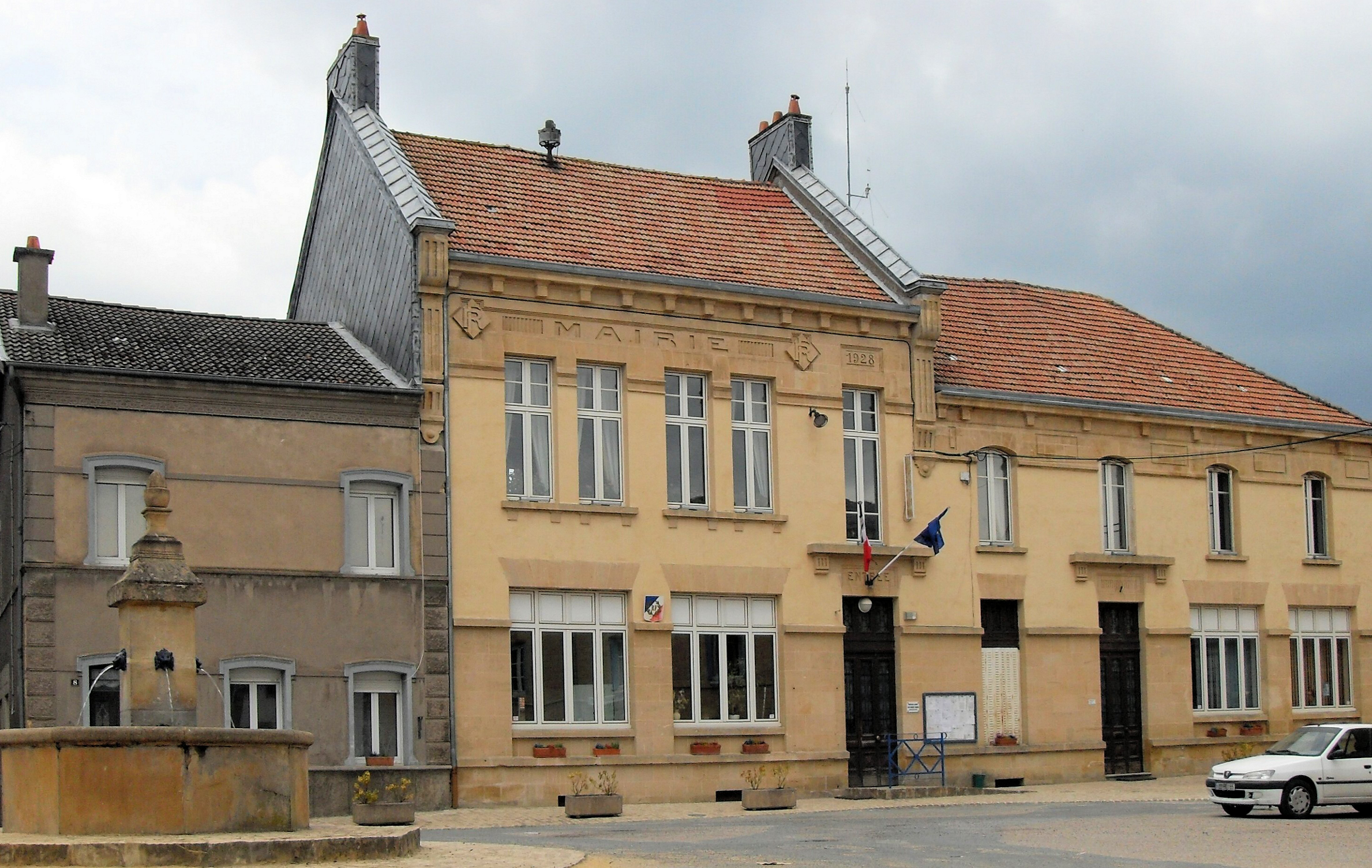
- The town hall in Marville

- Coat of arms
- Location of Marville
- Location within France Location within Grand Est
- Coordinates: 49°27′10″N 5°27′24″E
- Country: France
- Region: Grand Est
- Department: Meuse
- Arrondissement: Verdun
- Canton: Montmédy
- Intercommunality: CC du pays de Montmédy

Government
  - Mayor (2020–2026): André Jullion
- Area^{1}: 19.55 km^{2} (7.55 sq mi)
- Elevation: 272 m (892 ft)
- Highest elevation: 313 m (1,027 ft)
- Lowest elevation: 197 m (646 ft)
- Population (2023): 522
  - Density: 26.7/km^{2} (69.2/sq mi)
- Time zone: UTC+01:00 (CET)
  - Summer (DST): UTC+02:00 (CEST)
- INSEE/Postal code: 55324 /55600
- ^{1} French Land Register data, which excludes lakes, ponds, glaciers > 1 km^{2} (0.386 sq mi or 247 acres) and river estuaries.

Marville (French pronunciation: [maʁvil]) is a commune in the Meuse department in Grand Est in north-eastern France.

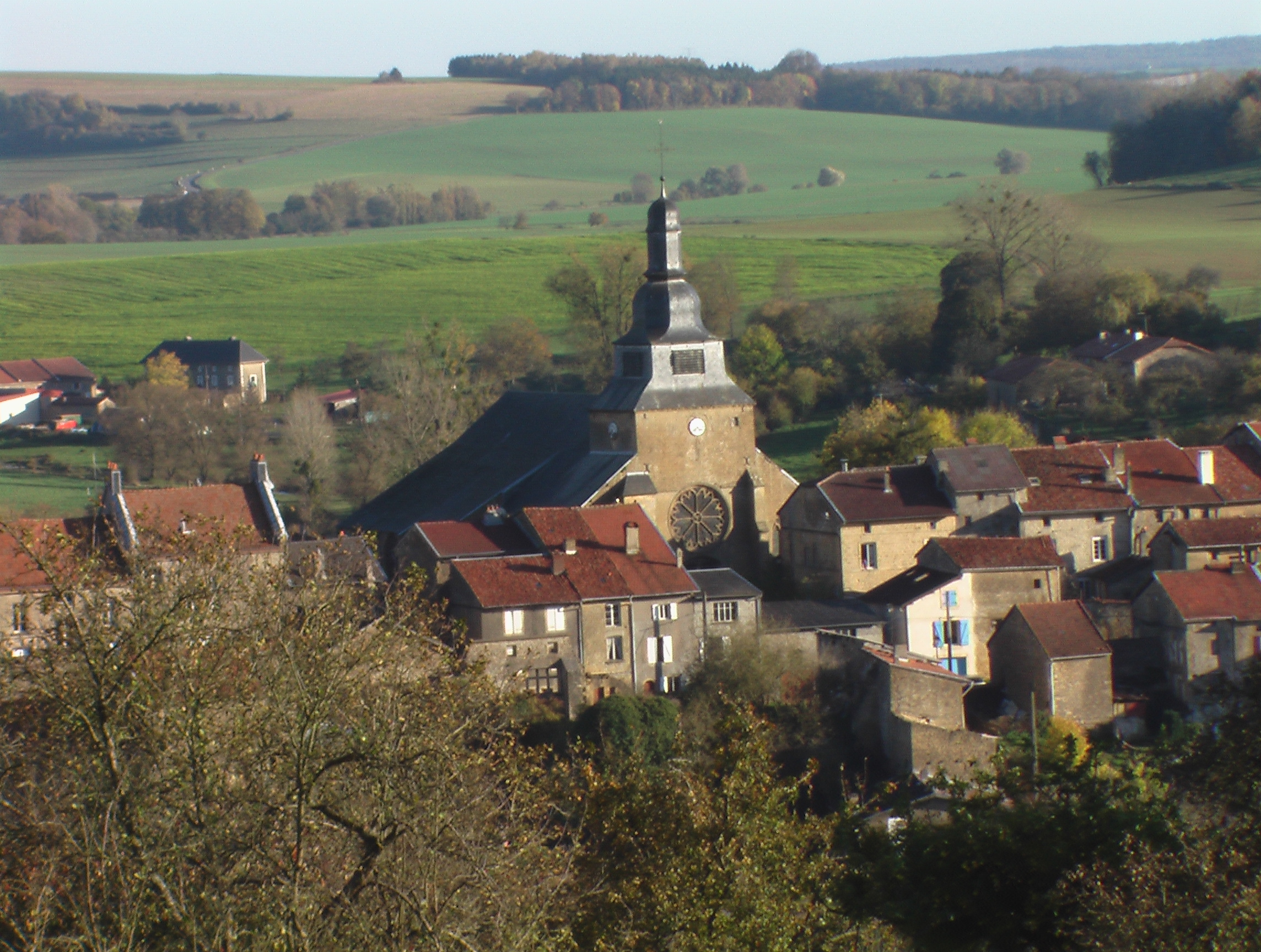
Marville

An airbase built by NATO hosted fighter squadrons from the RCAF from 1952 to 1967.

== Geography ==
The village lies on the left bank of the Othain, which forms most of the commune's eastern border.

== History ==
Marville was a part of the Duchy of Luxembourg until 1659. It was in this year that the first partition of Luxembourg was decided by the European great powers and thus Marville and the surrounding villages became part of the Kingdom of France.

Marville was used as the fictional commune of Saint-Clothilde in the 2002 Bruno Cremer Maigret episode Maigret et le fou de Saint-Clothilde (adapted from Maigret et le fou de Bergerac).

== See also ==
- Communes of the Meuse department
