= 444 Combat Support Squadron =

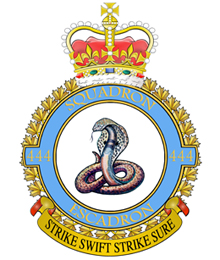
- 444 Squadron Badge
- Founded: 1 April 1993
- Country: Canada
- Branch: (Canada) Royal Canadian Air Force
- Role: Rescue
- Part of: 5 Wing
- Garrison/HQ: CFB Goose Bay
- Motto(s): STRIKE SWIFT STRIKE SURE

Commanders
- Commanding Officer: Major Erin Pratt

Aircraft flown
- Helicopter: CH-146 Griffon

444 Combat Support Squadron is an Air Force unit with the Canadian Armed Forces. Based at CFB Goose Bay, it provides helicopter support to the base operations.

== History ==
444 Fighter Squadron was formed in March 1953 at CFB St. Hubert, Quebec and moved to CFB Baden-Soellingen in West Germany.

Disbanded 1967, it was re-formed as 444 Tactical Helicopter Squadron at CFB Lahr, West Germany in 1972 as part of Canadian Forces Europe until 1991 and again in CFB Goose Bay in 1993.

== Past Aircraft ==
- de Havilland Canada DHC-1 Chipmunk April 1948 – 1949
- Auster AOP.6 June 1948 – 1949
- CL-13 Sabre 1953–1962
- CF-104 Starfighter 1962–1972
- CH-112 Nomad 1961–1972
- CH-136 Kiowa 1972–1991
- CH-135 Twin Huey 1993–1996
- Bell CH-146 Griffon 1996-Present
