= 27th Canadian Infantry Brigade =

Brigade of the Canadian Army

- Soldiers of the brigade arriving in Rotterdam on the SS Columbia, October 31, 1951
- Active: 4 May 1951 – 14 October 1953
- Country: Canada
- Branch: Canadian Army
- Type: Infantry brigade
- Size: 9,344 troops
- Garrison/HQ: Hanover
- Engagements: Cold War

The 27th Canadian Infantry Brigade (27CIBG) was an Active Force infantry brigade created on May 4, 1951, for service in West Germany. The brigade sailed to Rotterdam in November and December of that year. It was posted near Hanover and provided contingents for the Coronation of Queen Elizabeth II.

== Formation ==
In the early 1950s, Canada had several armies. In addition to the Canadian Army (Active) and the Canadian Army (Reserve), there was the Special Force, which had specifically enlisted for the Korean War. In January 1951, the Canadian Army formed a new infantry brigade to meet the country's commitments to NATO.

The brigade consisted of three infantry battalions called "PANDA battalions" (for Pacific and Atlantic). They were the 1st Canadian Infantry Battalion (formed in Valcartier, Quebec, on 4 May 1951), the 1st Canadian Rifle Battalion and the 1st Canadian Highland Battalion. Each battalion drew its personnel from five infantry regiments of the same type (line infantry, rifle or highland). Each regiment formed a complete PANDA company within that battalion with the headquarters unit being a composite.

A reorganization of the Canadian Army in 1953 led to a force of 15 infantry battalions: three for Korea, three for Canada, three for Europe and six for rotation.

On 14 October 1953 the 1st Canadian Infantry Brigade was reactivated and replaced the 27th. In the same year its battalions were re-designated as the Canadian Guards, the Black Watch (Royal Highland Regiment) of Canada and the Queen's Own Rifles of Canada.

== Order of Battle (ORBAT) and units ==
- Headquarters, 27th Canadian Infantry Brigade "C" Squadron, Royal Canadian Dragoons, (1st Armoured Regiment) RCAC
- 79th Field Regiment, RCA
- 58th Independent Field Squadron, RCE
- 27th Canadian Infantry Brigade Signal Squadron, RC Sigs
- 79th field Regiment Signal Troop, RC Sigs
- 27th Canadian Infantry Brigade Ground Defence Platoon, RCIC
- 1st Canadian Rifle Battalion, RCIC
- 1st Canadian Highland Battalion, RCIC
- 1st Canadian Infantry Battalion, RCIC
- No. 55 Transport Company, RCASC
- No. 79 field Ambulance, RCAMC
- No. 196 Light Aid Detachment, RCEME
- No. 197 Light Aid Detachment, RCEME
- No. 2 Field Security Section, C Int C
- No. 27 Provost Detachment, C Pro C
- No. 27 Canadian Public Relations Unit

To fill all units required 509 officers and 9,344 other ranks or a total of 9,853 all ranks.
