= Musée de la Défense aérienne =

Military aviation museum in La Baie, Quebec

- Established: 1997
- Location: La Baie, Quebec, Canada
- Coordinates: 48.3402°N 70.9910°W
- Website: museebagotville.ca/en/home

The Musée de la Défense aérienne is a Canadian museum in CFB Bagotville dedicated to the history of military aviation and the Royal Canadian Air Force.

The museum holds a collection of nine military aircraft. Its collections include planes such as a Canadair CF-5, a Avro Canada CF-100 Canuck, a CT-133 Silver Star, a CF-101 Voodoo, a F-86 Sabre, a MiG 23, a CF-18 Hornet and helicopters such as a Vertol H-21 and a UH-1 Iroquois.

It is one of four aviation museums in Quebec, along with Vintage Wings of Canada in Gatineau, the Montreal Aviation Museum in Sainte-Anne-de-Bellevue, and the Quebec Aerospace Museum in Saint-Hubert.

== History ==
The Musée de la Défense aérienne was founded in 1997. It is located on the grounds of CFB Bagotville. Visitors can tour RCAF 3 Wing as part of their visit. Along with the permanent collection of planes (which is located outside), the museum also has a main and a rotating exhibit in its building. Visitors can also try their hand at flying with two flight simulators.

== Collection ==
=== Airplanes ===
Plane	Serial
Avro Canada CF-100 Canuck	18472 (painted as 18437)
Canadair CF-5	116733
Canadair CT-133 Silver Star	
Canadair Sabre	19454
McDonnell CF-101 Voodoo	101027
McDonnell Douglas CF-18 Hornet	188720
Mikoyan-Gurevich MiG-23	0390324857

=== Helicopters ===
Plane	Serial
Bell UH-1 Iroquois	118106
Piasecki H-21	9642

== See also ==
- List of aviation museums
