= Quam =

Quam may refer to:

- Quam Heights, a mostly snow-covered ridge of Antarctica
- Quam Lake, a lake in Minnesota

== See also ==
- C-QUAM, method of broadcasting stereo AM radio
- Quami Ekta Dal, an Indian political party
- QAM (disambiguation)
