= QAM (disambiguation) =

QAM stands for Quadrature amplitude modulation

QAM may also refer to:

- QAM (television), digital television standard using quadrature amplitude modulation
- q.AM (Quaque die Ante Meridiem), indicates medication should be taken every morning
- Quantum analog of AM complexity class - see QMA
- Queer Azaadi Mumbai, LGBT pride march held in the Indian city of Mumbai
- Quebec Aerospace Museum, a museum in Canada
- Queen's Ambulance Service Medal, a British award (until 2022) with the post-nominal letters QAM

== See also ==
- Qaem, refers to two completely separate Iranian weapons: an air-to-ground glide bomb and a ground-to-air missile
- Quam (disambiguation)
