= CF-18 Demonstration Team =

Royal Canadian Air Force squad

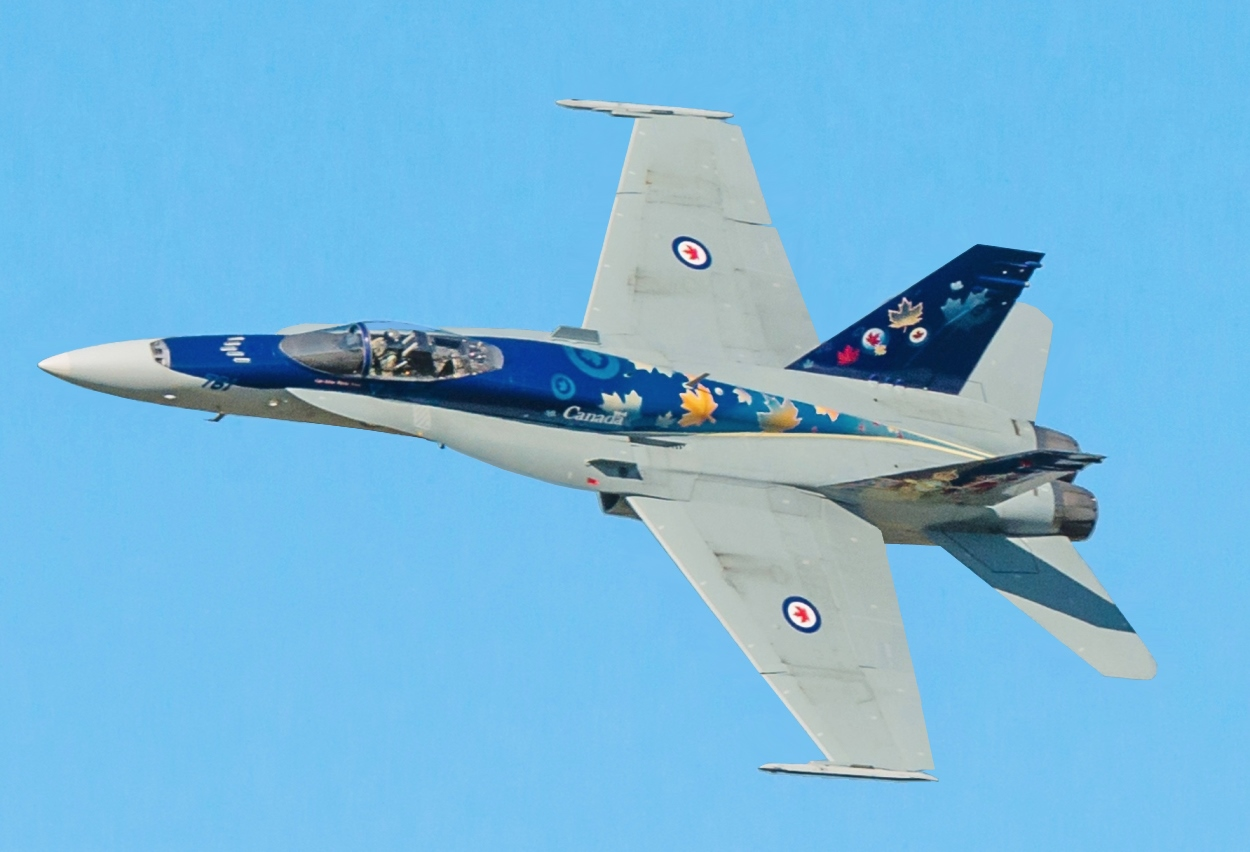
A Canadian McDonnell Douglas CF-18 Hornet in "special markings" used by the 2014 CF-18 Demonstration Team.

The CF-18 Demonstration Team was the flight demonstration team of Royal Canadian Air Force's 1 Canadian Air Division. The team flew the McDonnell Douglas CF-18 Hornet fighter aircraft at airshows internationally to showcase air combat manoeuvring. The team consisted of a demonstration pilot, three safety pilots, eight technicians (two teams of four, each servicing demonstrations on either the east or west sides of the country), a public affairs officer. The livery design of the team changed every year to highlight new military milestones or ideas. The team's members were selected from all divisions of the RCAF. The team's 2024 demonstration pilot was Captain Caleb "Tango" Robert.

On November 22nd, 2024, the RCAF stated that the CF-18 Demonstration Team would not be making a return in the following years due to the new air modernization initiative, instead choosing to fly regular CF-18 aircraft at certain airshows in Canada.
