= McDonnell Douglas CF-18 Hornet =

Series of multirole combat aircraft

CF-18 Hornet
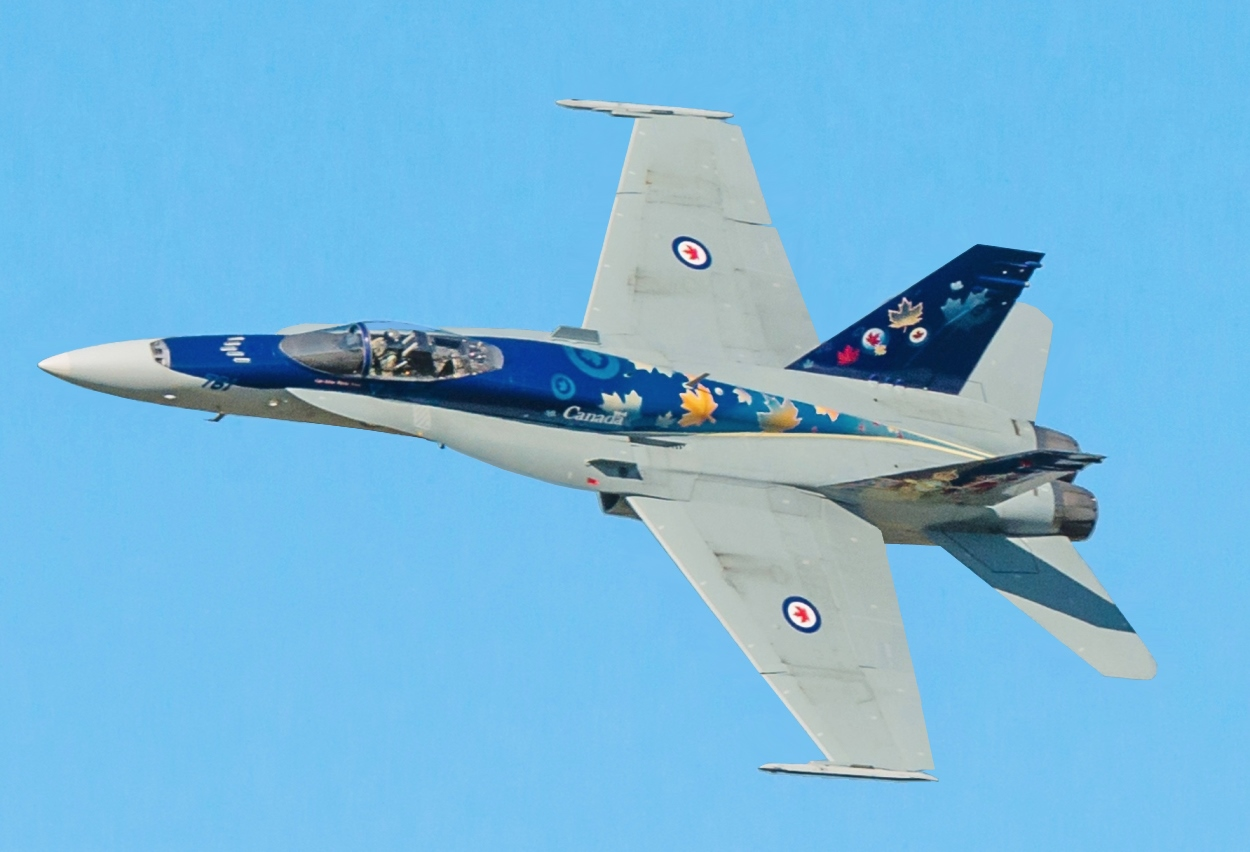
- An RCAF CF-18A performs during Canadian Armed Forces Day 2014

General information
- Type: Multirole fighter
- National origin: United States
- Manufacturer: McDonnell Douglas
- Status: In service
- Primary user: Royal Canadian Air Force
- Number built: 138

History
- Manufactured: 1982–1988
- Introduction date: 25 October 1982
- First flight: 28 July 1982
- Developed from: McDonnell Douglas F/A-18 Hornet

The McDonnell Douglas CF-18 Hornet (official military designation CF-188) is a Royal Canadian Air Force (RCAF) variant of the American McDonnell Douglas F/A-18 Hornet fighter aircraft. In 1980, the F/A-18 was selected as the winner of the New Fighter Aircraft Project competition to replace the CF-104 Starfighter, CF-101 Voodoo and the CF-116 Freedom Fighter. Deliveries of the CF-18 to the Canadian Armed Forces began in 1982. CF-18s have supported North American Aerospace Defense Command (NORAD) air sovereignty patrols and participated in combat during the Gulf War in 1991, the Kosovo War in the late 1990s, and as part of the Canadian contribution to the international Libyan no-fly zone in 2011. CF-18s were also part of the Canadian contribution to the military intervention against ISIL, Operation Impact. A procurement process to replace the CF-18 with the Lockheed Martin F-35 Lightning II has been ongoing since 1997.

== Development ==
=== New Fighter Aircraft program ===
In 1977, the Canadian government identified the need to replace the NATO-assigned CF-104 Starfighter, the NORAD-assigned CF-101 Voodoo and the CF-116 Freedom Fighter (although the decision was later made to keep the CF-116). Subsequently, the government proceeded with the New Fighter Aircraft (NFA) competition, with a purchase budget of around C$2.4 billion to purchase 130–150 of the winner of the competition. Candidates included the Grumman F-14 Tomcat, McDonnell Douglas F-15 Eagle, Panavia Tornado, Dassault Mirage F1 (later replaced by the Mirage 2000), plus the products of the American Lightweight Fighter (LWF) competition, the General Dynamics F-16 Fighting Falcon, the F/A-18 Hornet, and a de-navalized version of the Hornet, the Northrop F-18L. (Note: The F-18L, like the entire F-18 series, was derived from the Northrop YF-17 Cobra, the Hornet's predecessor.) The government stressed that the winner of the competition be a proven off-the-shelf design and provide substantial industrial benefits as part of the order.

By 1978, the New Fighter Aircraft competitors were short-listed to just three aircraft types: the F-16 and the two F-18 offerings. The F-14, F-15, and the Tornado were rejected due to their high purchase price, while Dassault dropped out of the competition. The F-18L combined the systems and twin-engine layout of the F-18 that Air Command favored with a lighter land-based equipment setup that significantly improved performance. Northrop, the primary contractor for the F-18L version, had not built the aircraft by the time of the NFA program, waiting on successful contracts before doing so. While Northrop offered the best industrial offset package, it would only "pay off" if other F-18L orders were forthcoming, something the Department of National Defence (DND) was not willing to bet on.

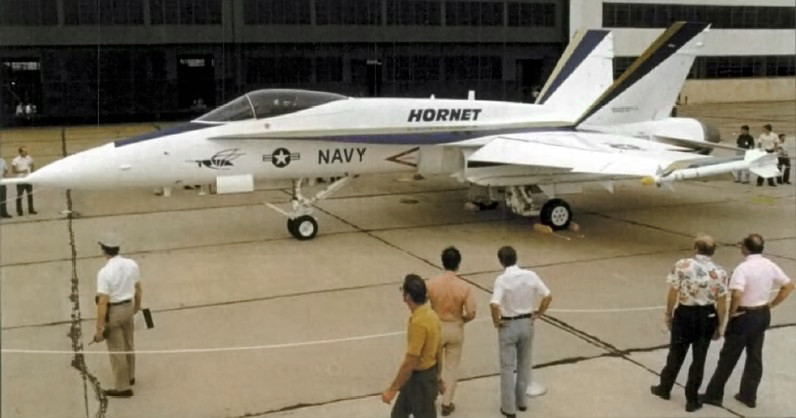
The first preproduction McDonnell Douglas YF-18A Hornet built for the U.S. Navy in October 1978.

The F-14 almost entered Canadian service through the backdoor due to the Iranian Revolution. In the aftermath of the revolution, the United States cut off all military supplies to Iran, which meant that the Iranians' new fleet of F-14s would potentially be rendered unflyable due to a lack of spares. The Canadians offered to purchase them at a steeply discounted price. Negotiations ended before a deal was reached as it was revealed that Canadian involvement was crucial in the smuggling of American embassy personnel out of the new Islamic Republic.

In 1980, the McDonnell Douglas F/A-18 Hornet was declared the winner of the New Fighter Aircraft competition. The order included 98 single-seat variants and 40 dual-seat variants, for a total of 138 purchased, plus 20 options (which were not exercised). The F/A-18 Hornet was then dubbed the CF-188. (Note: Initially, the name "Hornet" was not used because the translation in French is Frelon, already used by a French military helicopter. The official designation is now the CF-188 Hornet.) Outside official military documents, the aircraft are referred to as CF-18 Hornets. Reasons for the selection listed by the Canadian Forces were many of its requested features were included for the U.S. Navy; two engines for reliability (considered essential for conducting Arctic sovereignty and over-the-water patrols), an excellent radar set, while being considerably more affordable than the F-14 and the F-15. The CF-18 was procured from 1982 to 1988, at a total capital cost of $4 billion in 1982 dollars.

=== CF-18 design changes ===
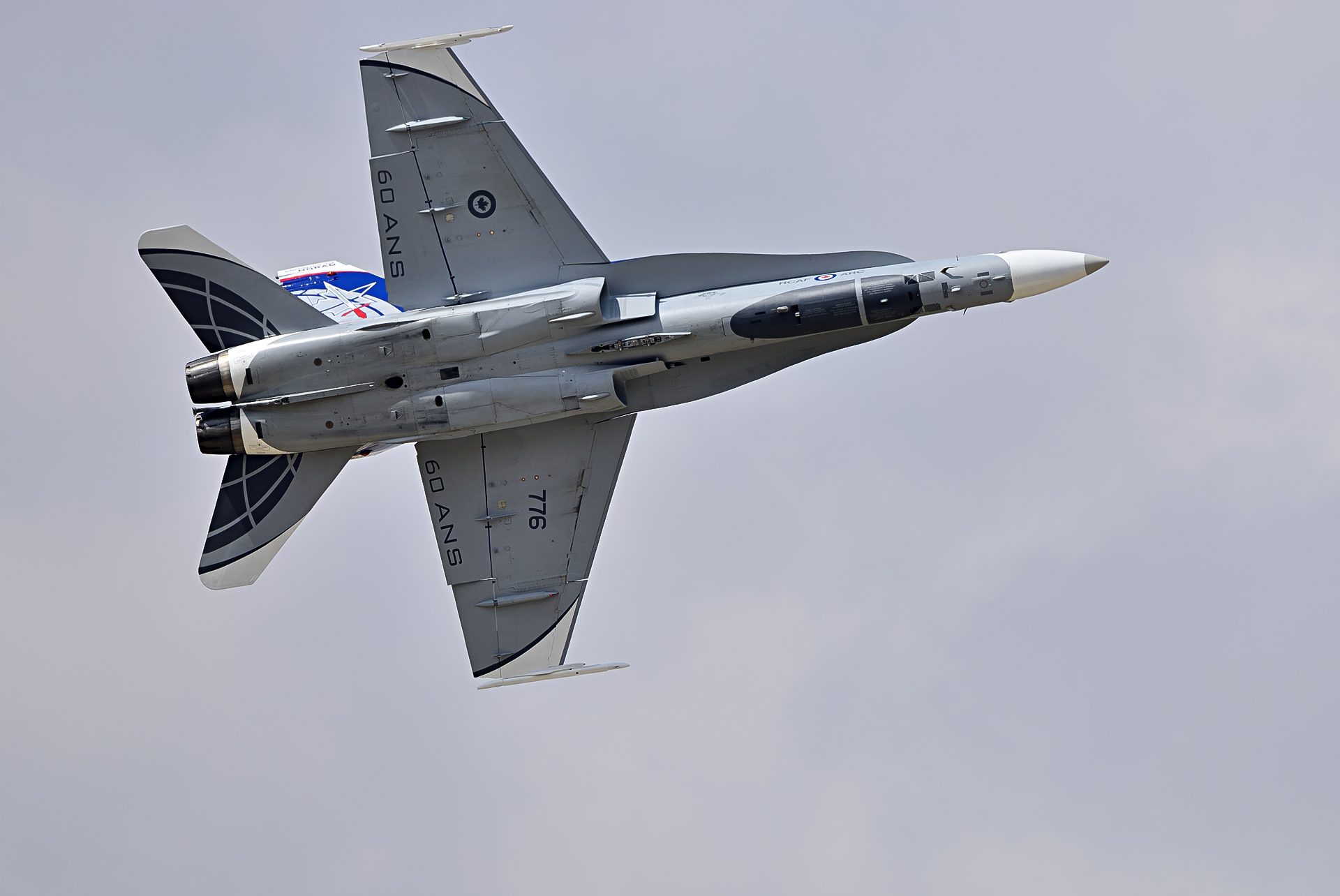
The underside of the aircraft, with a false canopy painted on its underside.

The original CF-18 as delivered is largely identical to the F/A-18A and B models. A total of 138 CF-18s, consisting of 98 single-seat and 40 dual-seat models, were delivered. Many features that made the F/A-18 suitable for naval carrier operations were retained by the Canadian Forces, such as the robust landing gear, the arrestor hook, and wing folding mechanisms.

The most visible difference between a CF-18 and a U.S. F-18 is the 0.6-megacandela night identification light. This spotlight is mounted in the gun loading door on the port side of the aircraft. Some CF-18s have the light temporarily removed, but the window is always in place. Also, the underside of the CF-18 features a painted "false canopy".

=== Upgrades ===
In 1994, engineers worked on a system that collected biomedical data from the passenger in the back seat of the aircraft. The need to upgrade the CF-18 was demonstrated during the Gulf War deployment and during the 1998-1999 Kosovo conflict as advances in technology had rendered some of the avionics on board the CF-18 obsolete and incompatible with NATO allies. In 2000, CF-18 upgrades became possible when the government increased the defence budget.

In 2001, the Incremental Modernization Project (IMP) was initiated. The project was broken into two phases over a period of eight years and was designed to improve air-to-air and air-to-ground combat capabilities, upgrade sensors and the defensive suite, and replace the datalinks and communications systems on board the CF-18 from the old F/A-18A and F/A-18B standard to the current F/A-18C and D standard. Boeing (merged with McDonnell Douglas), the primary contractor, and L-3 Communications the primary subcontractor, was issued a contract for the modernization project starting in 2002. A total of 80 CF-18s, consisting of 62 single-seat and 18 dual-seat models were selected from the fleet for the upgrade program. The project is supposed to extend the life of the CF-18 until around 2017 to 2020.

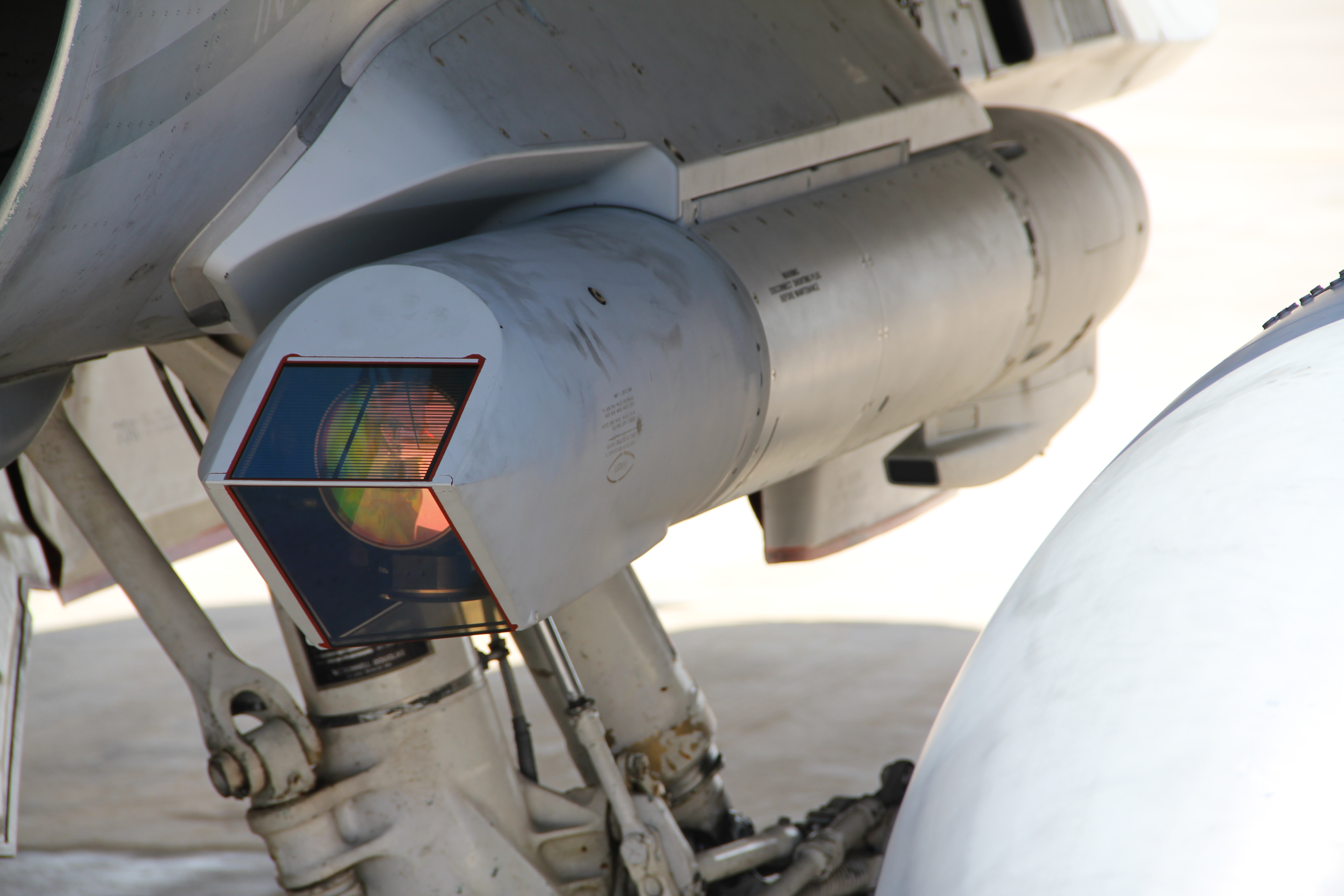
The Lockheed Martin Sniper XR on a CF-18

==== Incremental Modernization Project Phase I ====
- Replacement of the AN/APG-65 radar with the new AN/APG-73 radar, which has triple the processing speed and memory capacity, while also incorporating Terrain Following and Terrain Avoidance modes for low level ground attack missions. Furthermore, the new AN/APG-73 radar is also capable of guiding the modern AIM-120 AMRAAM medium range missile.
- Addition of the AN/APX-111 Combined Interrogator and Transponder, otherwise known as an IFF (Identification Friend or Foe). The new IFF brings the CF-18 up to current NATO standards for combat identification.
- Replacement of the radios with the new AN/ARC-210, RT-1556/ARC VHF/UHF Radio. This radio, capable of line-of-sight communications on VHF/UHF frequencies as well as HAVE QUICK, HAVE QUICK II, and SINCGARS waveforms resolved the issues of compatibility with allied forces, and are more resistant to jamming.
- Replacement of the mission computers with the General Dynamics Advanced Information Systems AN/AYK-14 XN-8 mission computer with increased memory and processing capabilities.
- Replacement of the Stores Management System with the Smiths Aerospace AN/AYQ-9 Stores Management System. This makes the CF-18 more compatible with the latest of precision guided munitions (PGMs) and furthermore adds the MIL-STD-1760 interface for use of the AIM-120 AMRAAM missile and the JDAM family of GPS-guided bombs.
- Installation of a Global Positioning System/Inertial Navigation System (GPS/INS) capability, enhancing the CF-18's navigational capabilities.

Within the same time frame, other non-IMP upgrades include:

- Installation of a new infrared sensor pod.
- Replacement of the old cathode-ray tube cockpit instrument panels with new flat paneled, full colour LCD displays from Litton Systems Canada (now L-3 Es Canada).
- Addition of a new night vision imaging system.
- Purchase of the AIM-120 AMRAAM medium-range missiles and other advanced air-to-air and air-to-ground munitions.
- Application of a landing gear "get well" program to reduce corrosion and improve gear retraction.
- Replacement of the existing CF-18 flight simulators with the Advanced Distributed Combat Training System.

The first completed "Phase I" CF-18 was delivered to the Canadian Forces on time in May 2003. Final delivery of all "Phase I" CF-18s was done at a ceremony on 31 August 2006 at L-3 Communications in Mirabel, Quebec.

==== Incremental Modernization Project Phase II ====
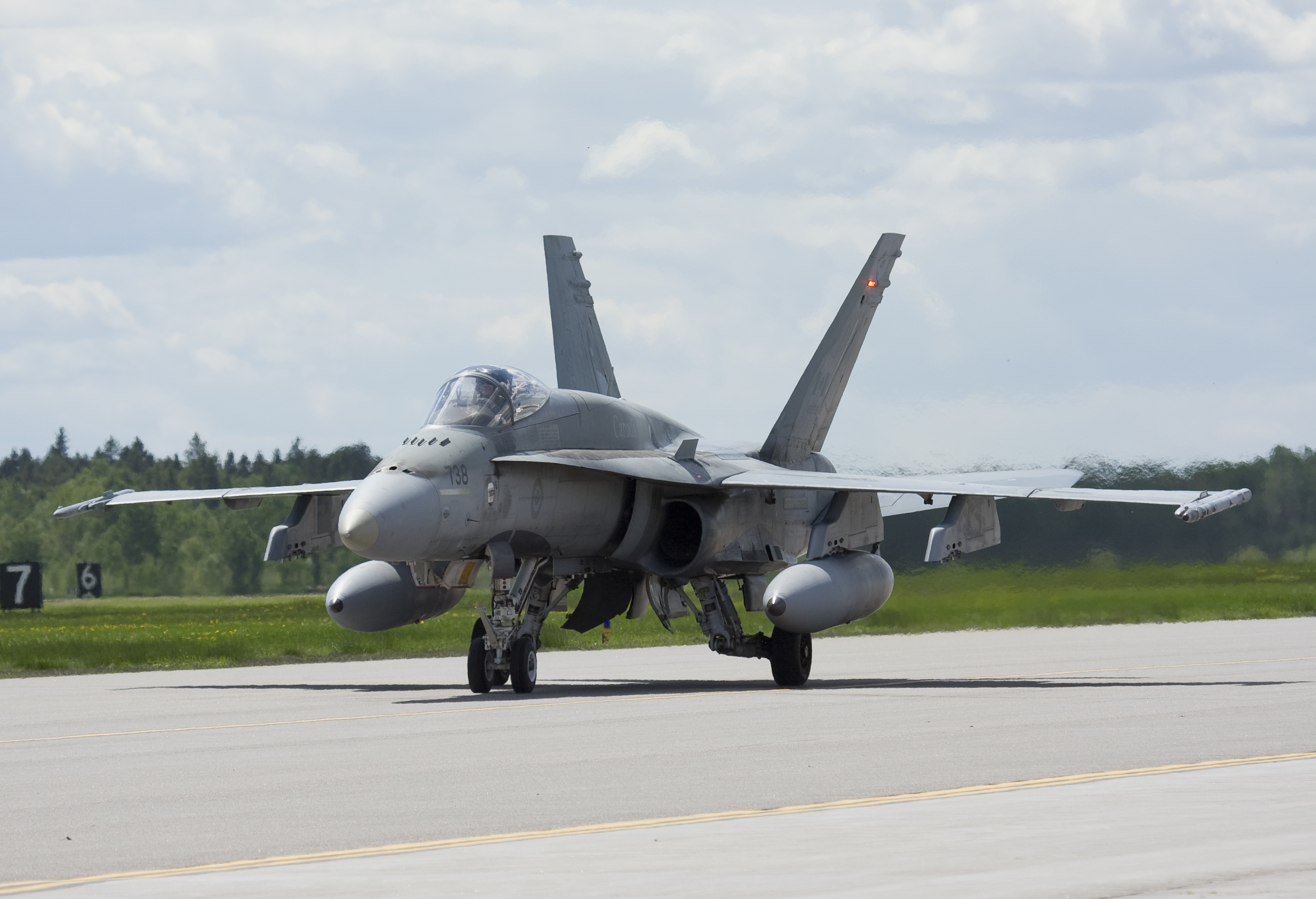
A 425 Squadron CF-18A Hornet after undergoing IMP Phase II, distinguishable because of the IFF antenna on its nose.

Phase II of the CF-18 Incremental Modernization Project was awarded to Boeing on 22 February 2005. It consists of the following upgrades:

- Addition of a Link 16 data net system to the aircraft, enhancing interoperability with major NATO allies.
- Integration of the Joint Helmet Mounted Cueing System from Boeing, BAE Systems, DRDC and L-3 Communications MAS.
- Addition of a crash survivable flight data recorder.
- Upgrade of the electronic warfare suite.

Within the same time frame, other upgrades unrelated to the IMP phases include the following.

- A fuselage Centre Barrel Replacement Project (for 40 of the upgraded aircraft)
- An Air Combat Manoeuvring Instrumentation System
- An Integrated Electronic Warfare Support Station
- An Electronic Warfare Test Equipment Project

The first completed "Phase II" CF-18 was delivered to the Canadian Forces on 20 August 2007, at a ceremony in Montreal. The total cost of the entire CF-18 Incremental Modernization Project and concurrent Hornet upgrades was expected to be around C$2.6 billion. The final upgraded aircraft was delivered in March 2010.

==== Hornet Extension Program ====
Phase I of the Hornet Extension Project (HEP) applies to entire fleet of 94 CF-188A/Bs and started in 2020 with completion expected in 2023. This will prolong the fighter's parity and interoperability with NATO and civil aviation standards to 2032. The package further expands compatibility support with the longer ranged AIM-120D AMRAAM air-to-air missiles initially acquired in 2017. It includes the following upgrades:

- Automatic Dependent Surveillance-Broadcast (ADS-B) to replace the obsolescent transponders.
- New Honeywell GPS/INS systems
- Upgraded Collins Aerospace AN/ARC-210 RT-2036 (Gen 6) radios
- Airborne Joint Tactical Radios
- Upgrades to the Lockheed Martin Sniper
- Enhanced mission computers and data transfer units, and software updates for the Advanced Distributed Combat Training System (ADCTS) for networked flight simulation exercises.

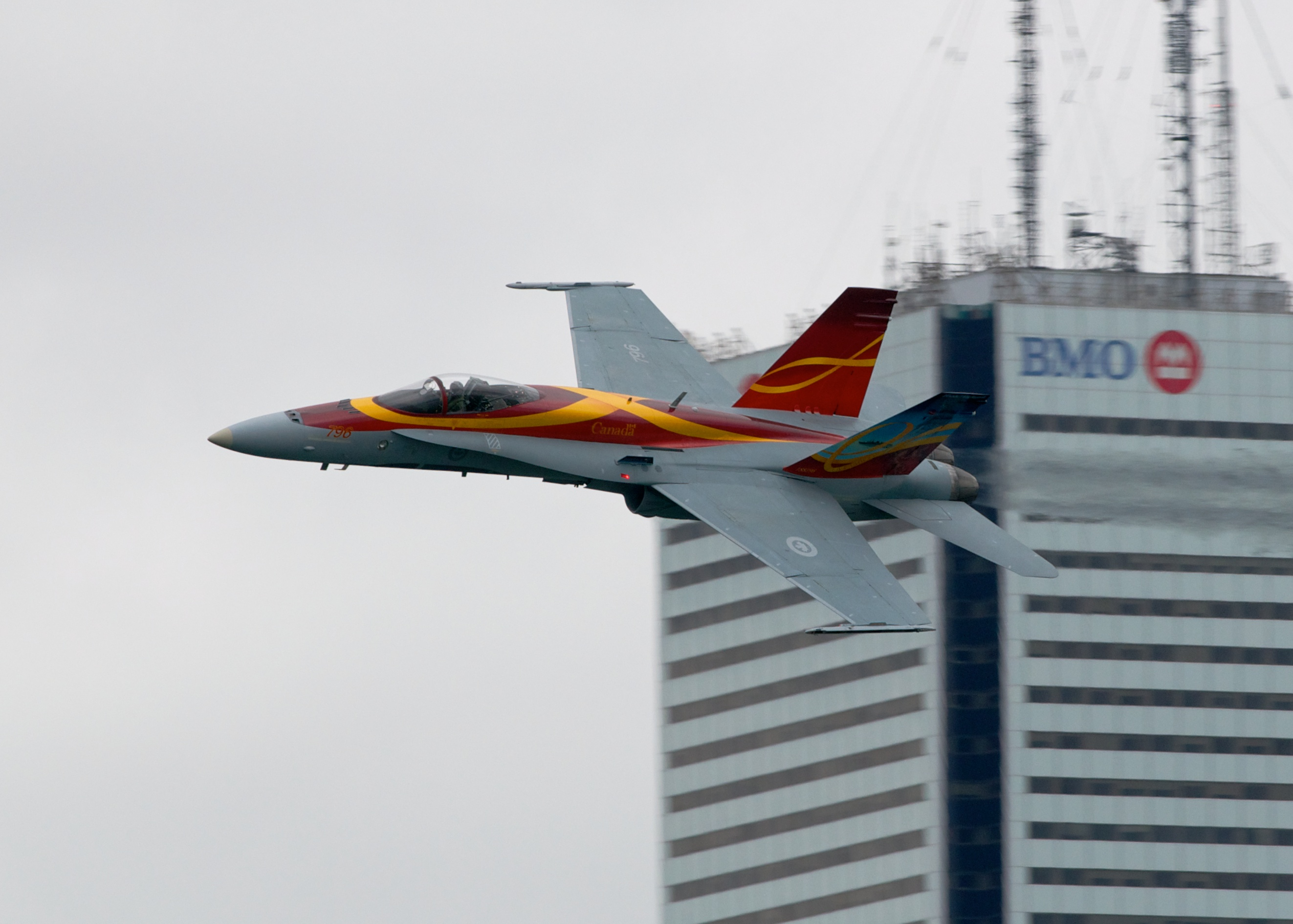
A CF-18 of the No. 409 Squadron flies by First Canadian Place, 2011.

Phase Il of the HEP applies to a fleet of 36 x CF-188A/B airframes with the estimated longest remaining life. Officially, "Phase 2 is focused on additional combat capability upgrades for 36 CF-188 aircraft, to ensure that sufficient, operationally relevant, mission-ready CF-188 fighters are available to meet air power capability requirements in the current battle space until the future fighter fleet reaches full operational capability". Initial delivery is expected in 2023 with full operational capability expected by June 2025. These upgrades were part of a package which include the delivery of:

- 50 x AIM-9X Sidewinder Block II tactical missiles;
- 38 x CA/APG-79(V)4 active electronically scanned array (AESA) radars;
- 38 x CA/APG-79(V)4 AESA radar A1 kits;
- 46 x F/A-18A wide-band RADOMEs;
- Upgrades to the Advanced Distributed Combat Training System;
- On-going Technical assistance to support the upgraded jets

The total cost of the HEP Phase II package was estimated by US Congressional Budget Office at US$862.3 Million.

The total program cost for the CF-18 purchase and upgrade programs up until 2011 was approximately $11.5 billion (in 2011 dollars) including upgrades. Additionally, the cost of maintenance for any 20-year period has been approximately $5 billion, or $250 million per year.

On 8 March 2024, Arcfield Canada was awarded a CA$211.6 million (US$157.3 million) sustainment contract to support and maintain the CF-18's avionics weapons systems, supply parts and provide end-to-end supply chain services with the contract being effective on 1 April 2024.

As of 5 February 2025, the Royal Canadian Air Force has officially begun equipping the AIM-9X Block II Sidewinder missile on its fleet of HEP Phase II upgraded CF-18s.

== Operational history ==
=== Entering service ===
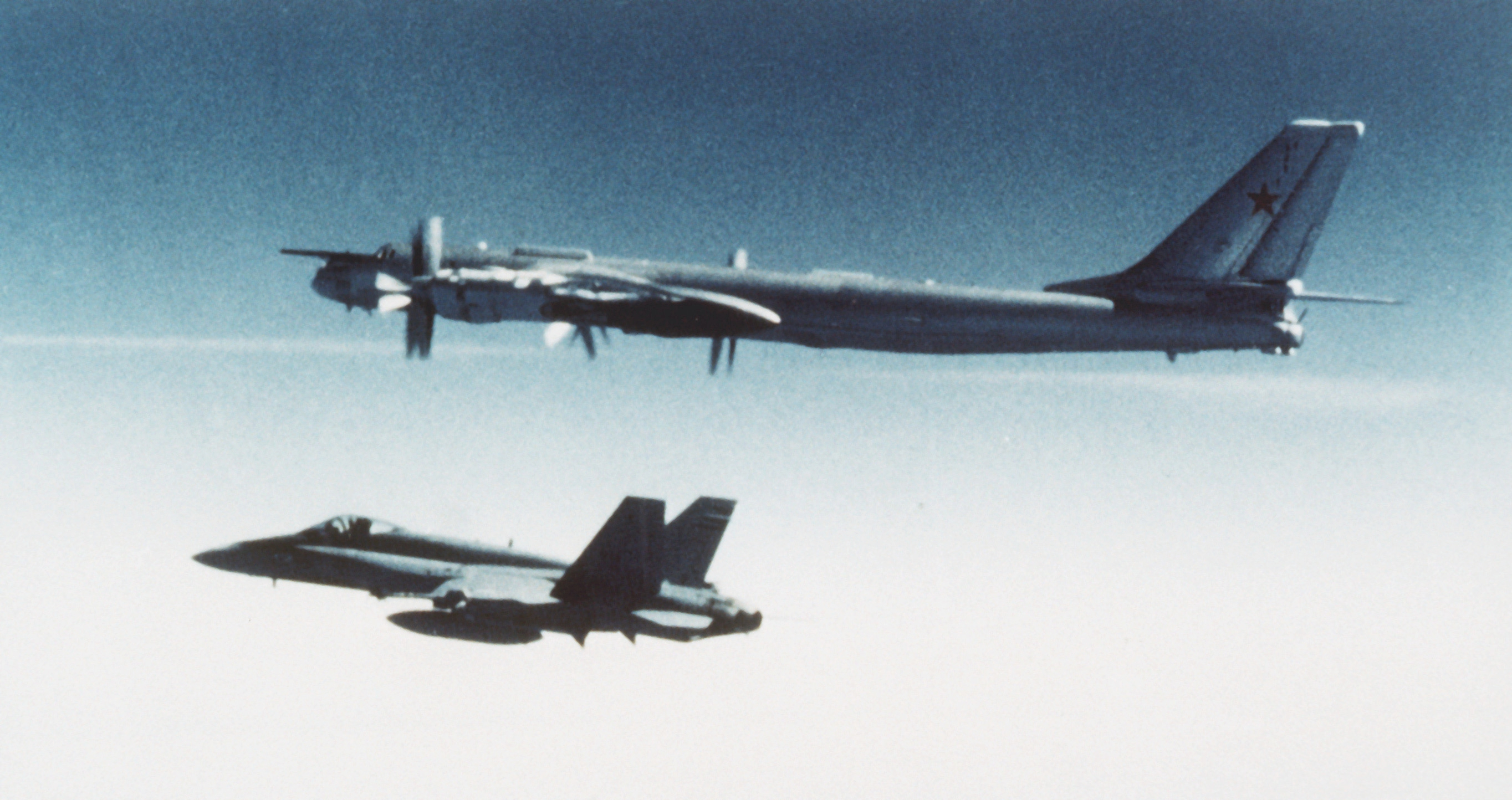
A Soviet Tu-95 Bear-H bomber escorted by a CF-18A Hornet in 1987.

The first two CF-18s were formally handed over to 410 (Operational Training Unit) Squadron at CFB Cold Lake, Alberta on 25 October 1982. Further deliveries equipped 409, 439, and 421 Squadrons at Baden-Soellingen in then West Germany, the 410 Operation Training Unit, No. 416, and No. 441 Squadrons at Cold Lake, and 425 and 433 Escadrons (Squadrons) at CFB Bagotville, Quebec. Introduction into Canadian service was initially problematic due to early issues with structural fatigue which delayed initial deployment. As the initial bugs were worked out, the CF-18 started filling the NORAD interception and NATO roles as intended.

=== Combat ===
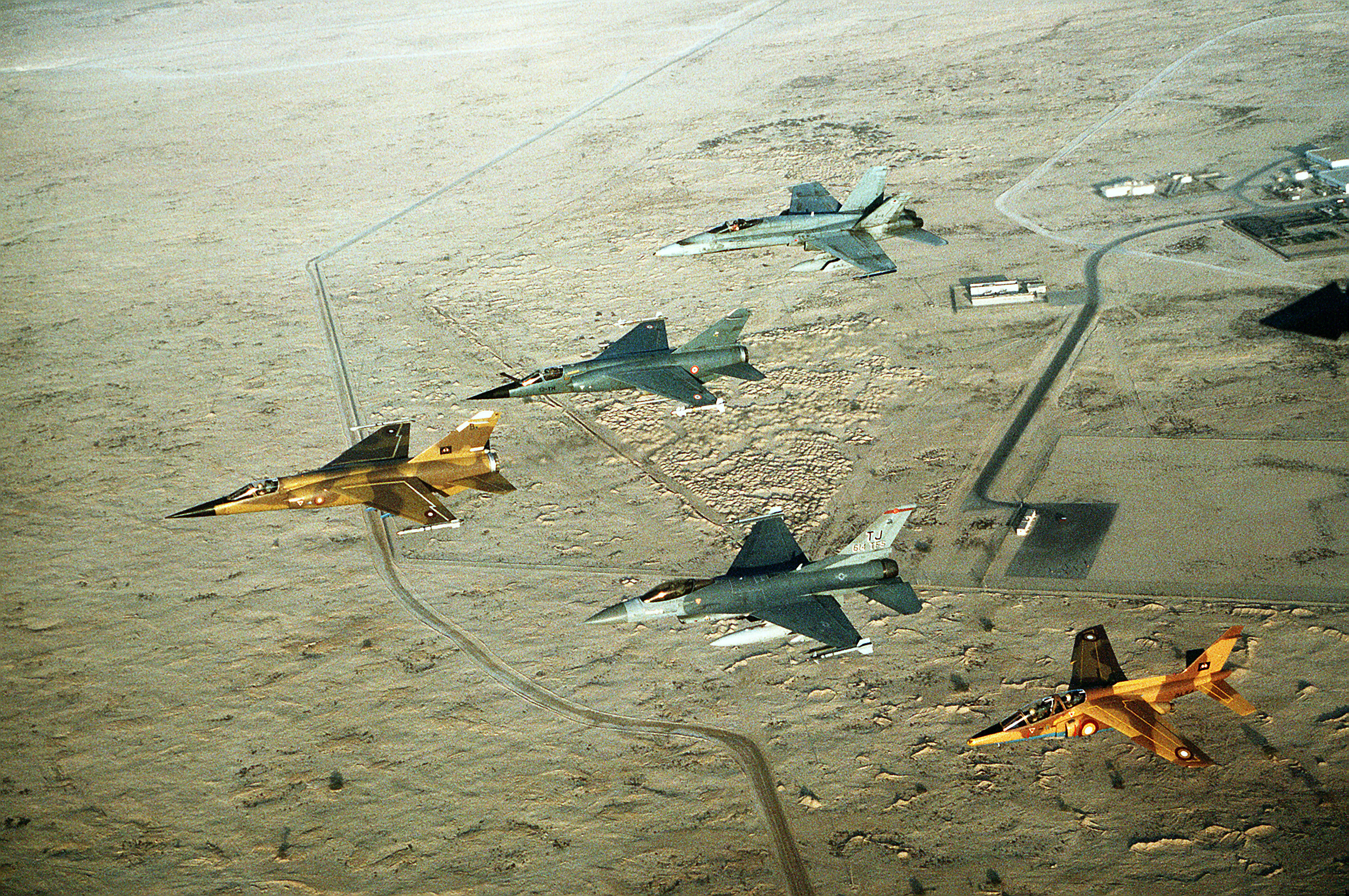
A multinational group of fighter jets during the Gulf War. A CF-18A is visible in the background.

In 1991, Canada committed 26 CF-18s to the Gulf War on Operation Friction. (Note: The U.S. portion of the Gulf War was called Desert Shield/Desert Storm.) The CF-18s were based in Doha, Qatar. During the Gulf War, Canadian pilots flew more than 5,700 hours, including 2,700 combat air patrol missions. These aircraft were taken from Canada's airbase in Germany, CFB Baden-Soellingen. In the beginning the CF-18s began sweep-and-escort combat missions to support ground-attack strikes by Allied air forces. During the 100-hour Allied ground invasion in late February, CF-18s also flew 56 bombing sorties, mainly dropping 500 lb (230 kg) non-guided ("dumb") bombs on Iraqi artillery positions, supply dumps, and marshaling areas behind the lines. At the time the Canadian Hornets were unable to deploy precision guided munitions. This was the first time since the Korean War that the Canadian military had participated in combat operations.

Continuing violence in the former Yugoslavia brought CF-18s into theatre twice: first for a deployment (Operation Mirador) during August–November 1997 for air patrols supporting NATO peacekeepers in Bosnia and Herzegovina, and again from late June 1998 until late December 2000 (Operation Echo).

From March to June 1999, with 18 CF-18s already deployed to Aviano, Italy, Canada participated in both the air-to-ground and air-to-air roles. Canadian aircraft conducted 10 percent of the NATO strike sorties despite deploying a much smaller percentage of the overall forces. Canadian pilots flew 678 combat sorties: 120 defensive counter-air escorts for Allied strike packages and 558 bombing strikes during 2,577 combat flying hours. CF-18s dropped a total of 397 PGMs and 171 non-guided bombs on a wide variety of targets including surface-to-air missile sites, airfields, bridges and fuel storage areas.

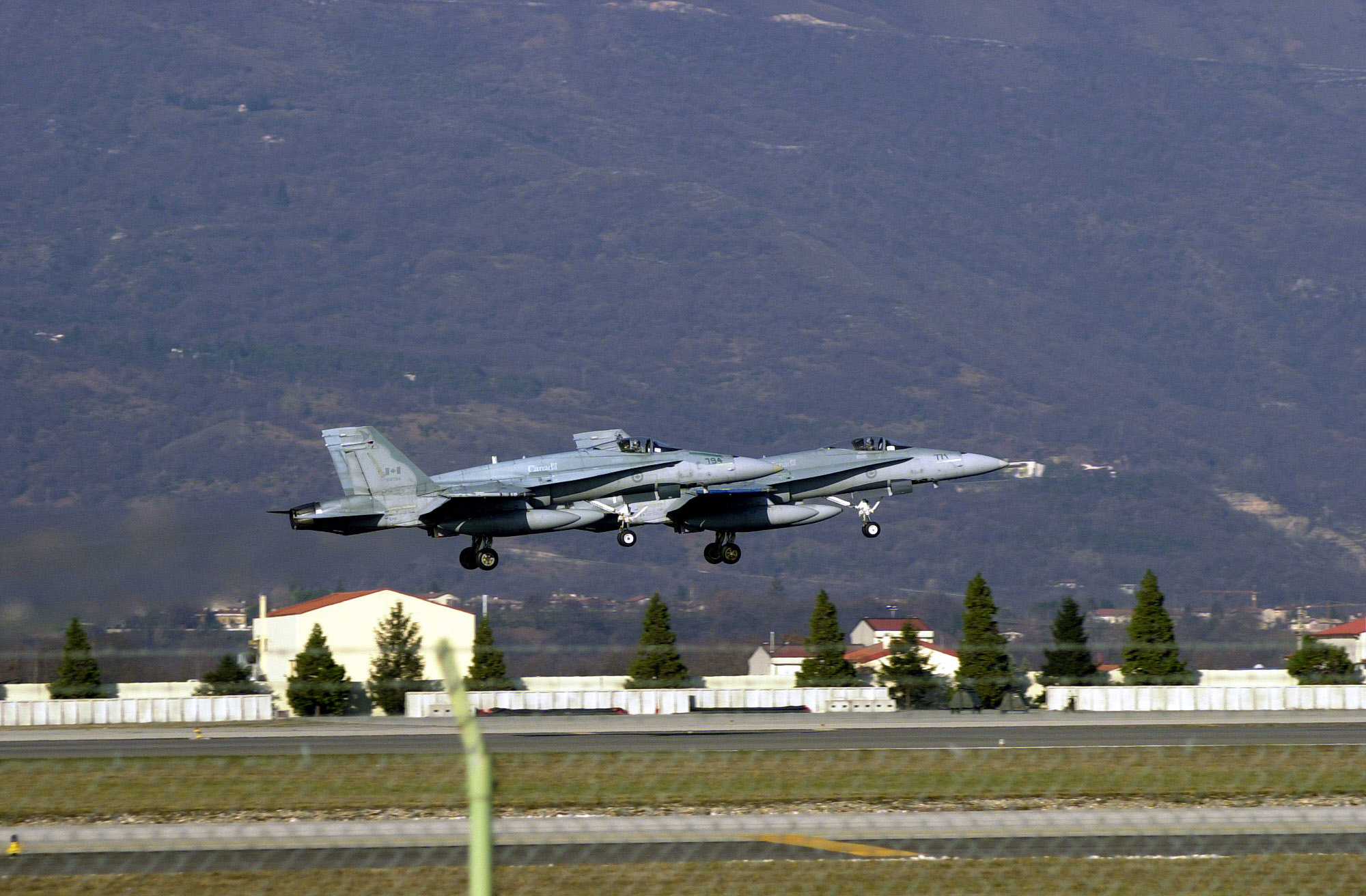
Canadian CF-18s depart Aviano Air Base, Italy, after contributing 2,600 combat flying hours in support of NATO Operation Allied Force.

Since 2001, CF-18s have responded to nearly 3,000 possible threats to Canada and the United States. A task group of CF-18s and CH-146 Griffons were deployed during "Operation Grizzly" to Kananaskis, Alberta in June 2002 where they were deployed to secure the airspace during the 28th G8 summit. In 2007, an unknown number of CF-18s were deployed to Alaska. They were deployed during two weeks to defend United States airspace as a result of the primary USAF F-15 fighter jet fleet being grounded due to structural defects. They were also deployed during "Operation Podium" to secure the 2010 Winter Olympics and 2010 Winter Paralympics games.

After a United Nations Security Council resolution was adopted to enforce a Libyan no-fly zone, the Government of Canada on 18 March 2011, authorized the deployment of six CF-18 Hornets with one Hornet in reserve as part of Operation Mobile. The Hornets were based at Trapani-Birgi Italian Air Force base in western Sicily. CF-18s were first put into combat on 23 March 2011 when four aircraft bombed Libyan government targets. The seven Hornets returned to CFB Bagotville, Canada, on 4 November 2011 after the end of the UN-approved NATO mission. In total, the Hornets conducted 946 sorties, making up 10% of NATO strike sorties. Over the course of their sorties, 696 bombs were dropped including Laser-guided bombs and Joint Direct Attack Munitions (JDAM). The RCAF has dropped 495 of the 227 kg versions (500 lbs) and 188 of the 910 kg versions (2,000 lbs) Paveway II bombs. The RCAF also dropped 11 Joint Direct Attack Munitions of the 227 kg versions and two 910 kg versions.

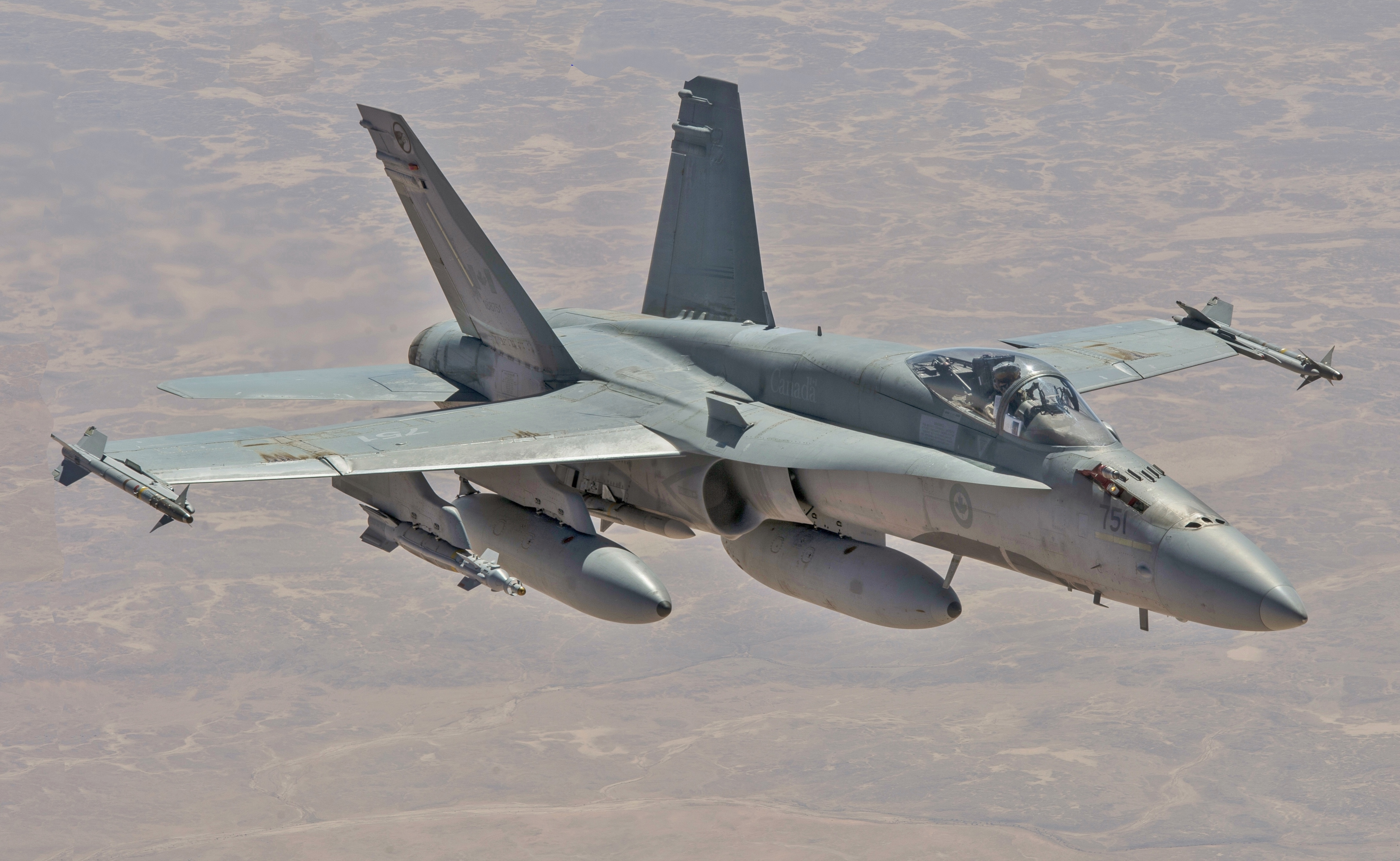
An airborne CF-18 during Operation Impact in Iraq, 2017.

Canada sent six CF-18s to Iraq as part of Operation Impact on 21 October 2014. Air strikes on ISIS/ISIL positions began on 2 November 2014. The CF-18s flew air strike missions until 15 February 2016.

=== Replacement ===
Various fighter aircraft have been considered by the Canadian Forces as CF-18 replacements, with the Lockheed Martin F-35 Lightning II, Eurofighter Typhoon, Saab JAS 39 Gripen, Dassault Rafale, and the Boeing F/A-18E/F Super Hornet having been promoted as contenders by their manufacturers. According to Le Devoir, project costs without considering maintenance, training and spare parts, were estimated at $4 to $8 billion. Boeing indicated that the Super Hornet, a derivative of the Hornet, was a less expensive alternative at an estimated total cost of $4 billion. One of the manufacturers in contention, Boeing, BAE Systems or Saab Aerospace—the name was not disclosed—had promised to assemble the entire aircraft in Canada. Boeing said that it was contemplating closing the F/A-18 production line due to lack of orders.

In July 2010, Canada announced that the F-35 would replace the CF-18. Canada has been a partner in the Joint Strike Fighter program since 1997, and a Tier 3 partner since 2002. The Canadian Forces planned to buy 65 F-35s with deliveries starting in 2016; the contract was estimated to be worth C$9 billion, including aircraft and associated weapons, infrastructure, initial spares, training simulators, contingency funds and project operating costs. Media reports indicated that the lifetime cost of the aircraft might be as high as C$40 billion. In December 2012, it was announced that the government had abandoned the F-35 deal due to escalating cost, and was beginning a new procurement process, with the F-35 still being considered.

On 20 September 2015, Canadian Liberal Party leader Justin Trudeau promised to cancel the country's F-35 procurement if he were elected, instead replacing the CF-18 fleet with a less costly alternative, and argued that the F-35 was not needed. He was sworn in as Prime Minister on 4 November 2015. In May 2017, Defence Minister Harjit Sajjan announced that Canada would purchase more than the 65 jets proposed by the previous government. He stated that if Canada is to meet its NATO and NORAD commitments while also maintaining its own national air defence, "then 65 jets would not be a full fleet. It would only be a fleet for risk managing our requirements, not meeting them." On 2 June 2017, it was announced that Canada would be acquiring 88 advanced multi-role fighters.

As an interim measure pending replacement, Canada decided in December 2017 to purchase 18 F/A-18A/B Hornets (a mix of flyable airframes and spares) from the Royal Australian Air Force for approximately C$90 million. It was later announced in an Australian Senate hearing that Canada planned to purchase another seven Hornets to be disassembled for spare parts. The first two fighters arrived in February 2019, with the rest to be delivered over the next three years. "Total cost of the interim aircraft including modifications, inspections and changes to infrastructure and program costs was estimated to be C$360 million." In 2021 the last RAAF fighter was delivered.

On 28 March 2022, Canada announced that advanced negotiations with Lockheed Martin for 88 F-35s would begin. The F-35 is the top bid for the Future Fighter Capability Project while Saab's proposal for the Gripen came in second. The Canadian government noted that the Gripen may be chosen if negotiations with Lockheed Martin stall. This decision was to ensure a reasonable price for the aircraft. If negotiations succeed and Canada agrees a contract with Lockheed Martin, deliveries should begin in 2026, with final delivery in 2032. The complete program cost, including sustainment and maintenance, is estimated to be up to C$19 billion. In December 2022, the Canadian government approved $7 billion to procure a first batch of 16 F-35As and related equipment and support.

== Variants ==
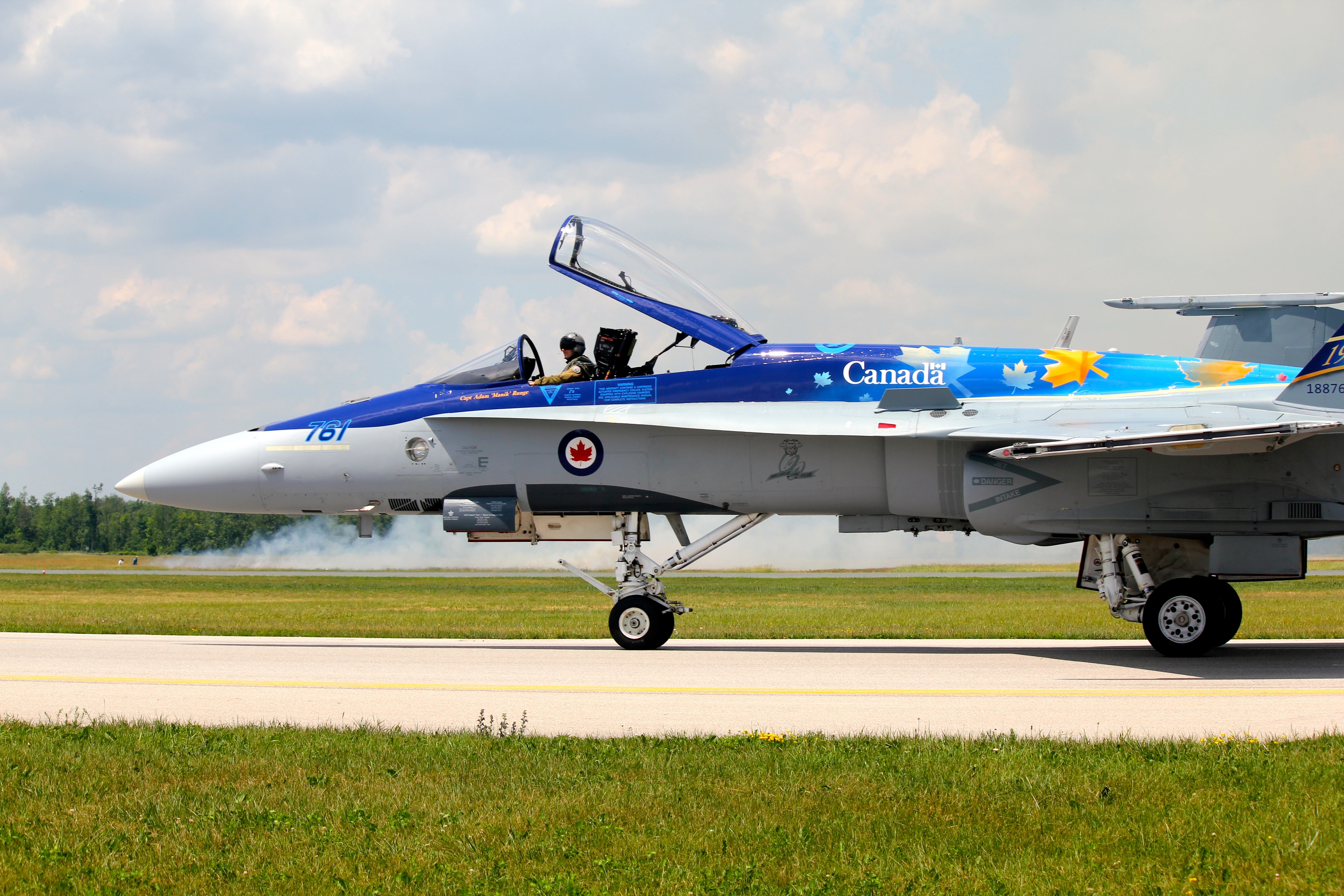
CF-18A (single-seat) variant

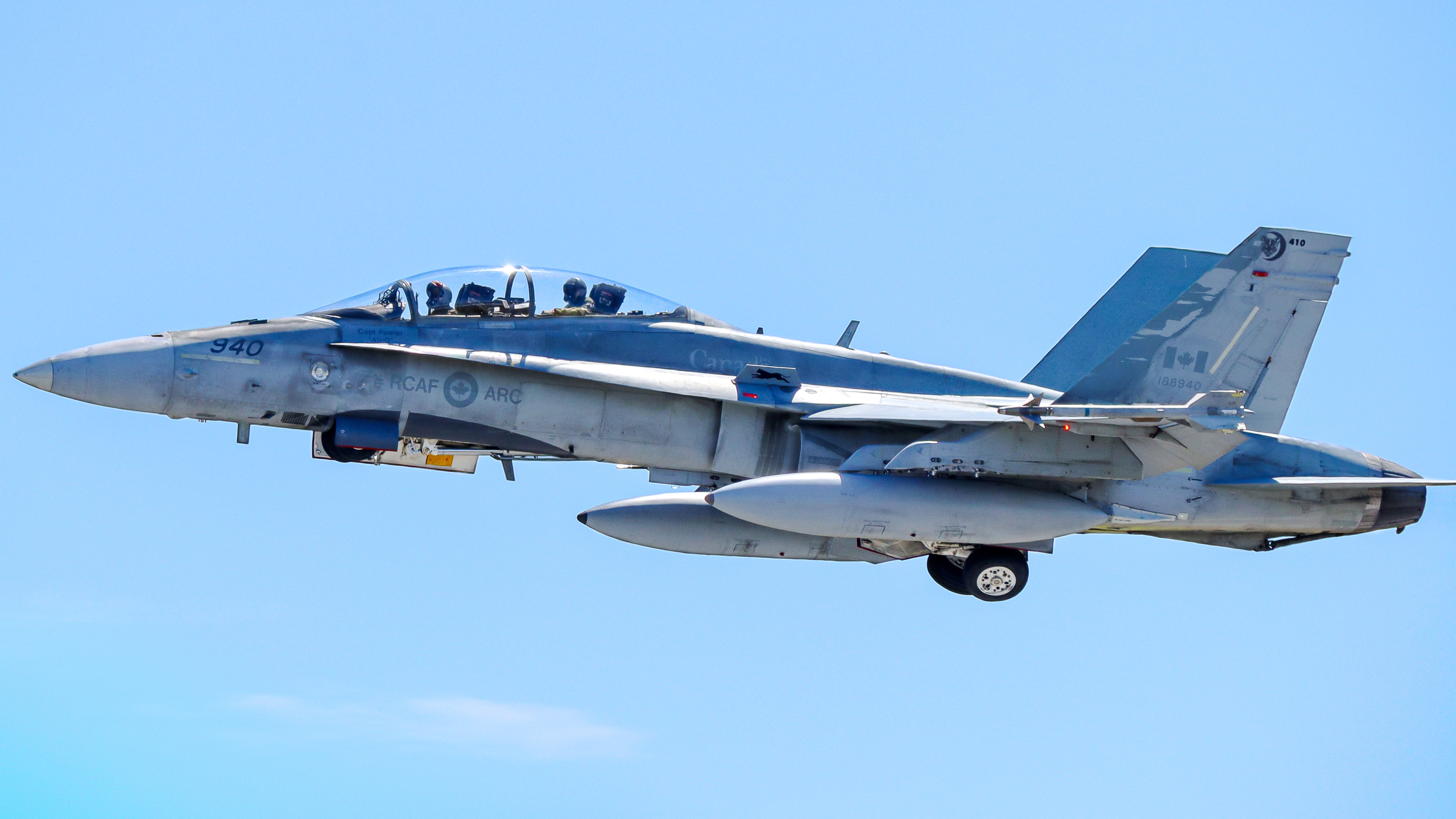
CF-18B (dual-seat) variant

- CF-18A: Single-seat fighter and ground attack aircraft. Canadian Forces designation is CF-188A, 98 built.
- CF-18B: Two-seat training version. Canadian Forces designation is CF-188B, 40 built. This variant has a 6% reduction in fuel capacity to accommodate the second seat, but is otherwise fully combat capable.

== Operators ==
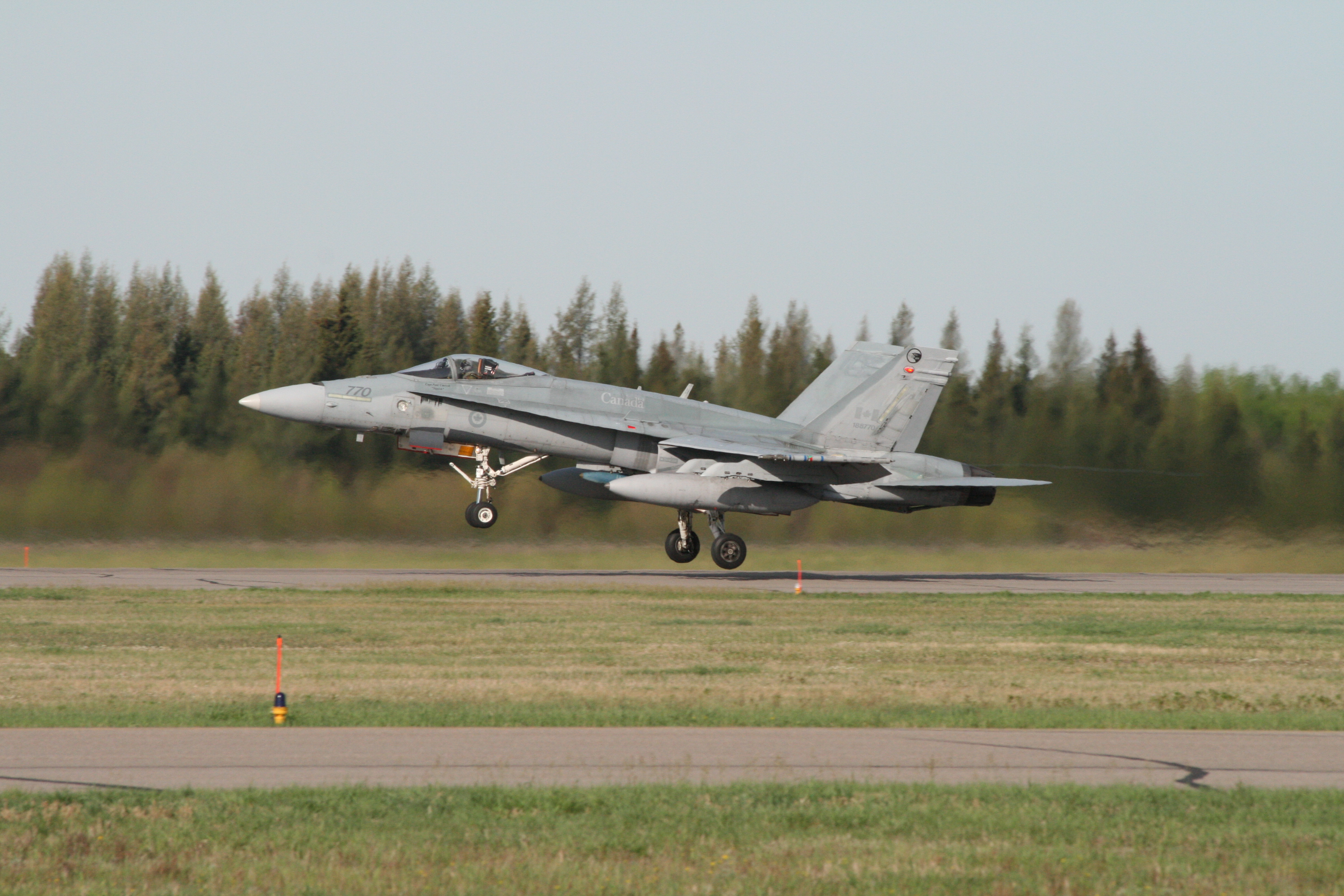
A CF-18A taking off at CFB Cold Lake, 2008.

Canada

- Royal Canadian Air Force (RCAF) had 72 CF-18As and 31 CF-18Bs in inventory as of November 2008. 79 in operational use. 86 (63 CF-18A & 23 CF-18B) aircraft in use as of 2021. 89 (83 CF-18AM/BM) Hornet; 6 CF-18AM/BM HEP Hornet aircraft in use as of 2025
  - 3 Wing CFB Bagotville, Quebec
    - No. 425 Tactical Fighter Squadron
    - No. 433 Tactical Fighter Squadron
  - 4 Wing CFB Cold Lake, Alberta
    - No. 401 Tactical Fighter Squadron
    - No. 409 Tactical Fighter Squadron
    - No. 410 Tactical Fighter (Operational Training) Squadron
    - AETE (Aerospace Engineering Test Establishment)

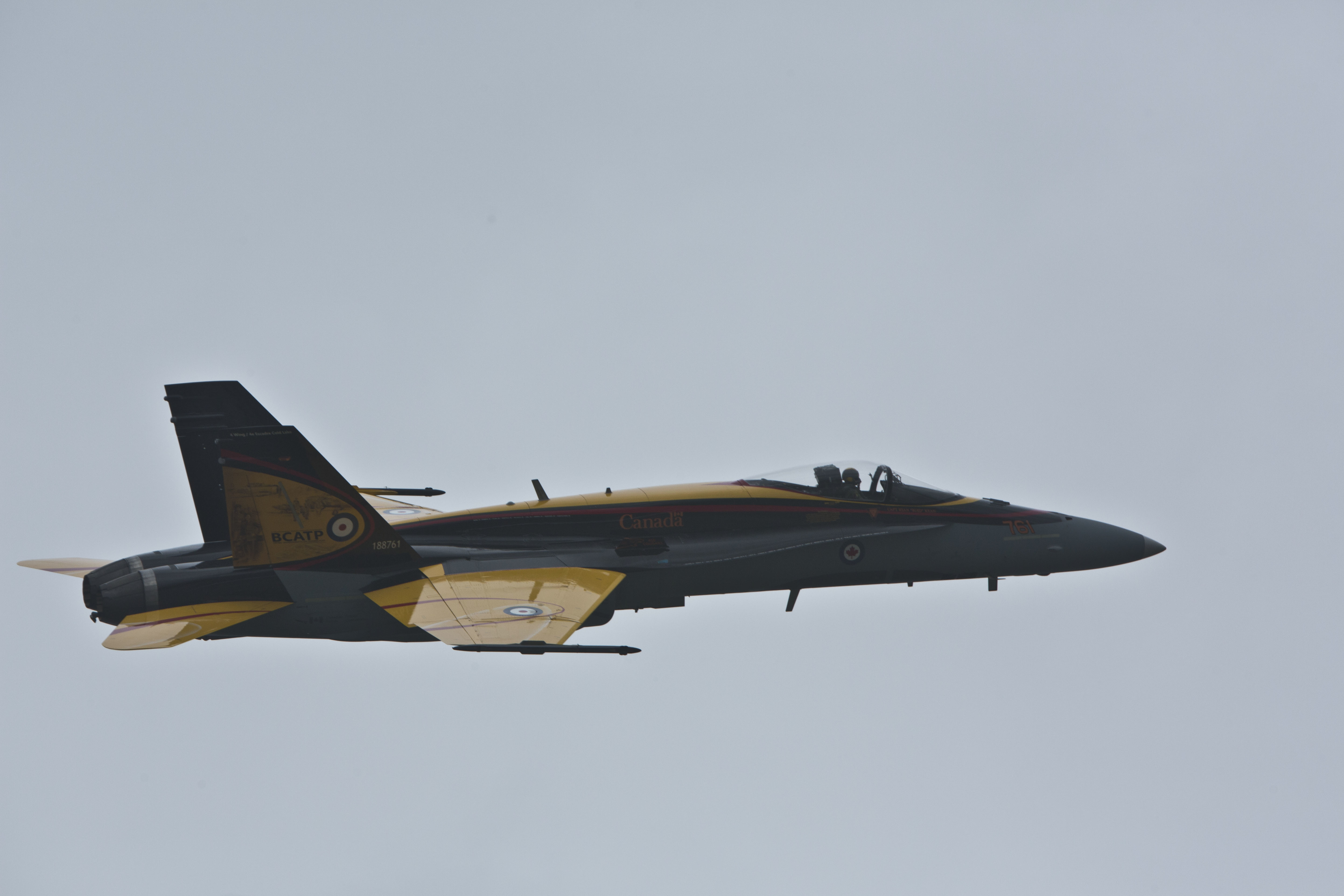
A CF-18A with the RCAF's CF-18 Demonstration Team during an aerial performance, 2016.

Rotations from Cold Lake occur from 4 Wing to CFB Comox, British Columbia, and from 3 Wing Bagotville to CFB Goose Bay and CFB Gander, Newfoundland and Labrador, CFB Greenwood, Nova Scotia, and various forward operating bases in the Canadian Arctic. CF-18 aircraft may also be stationed at CFB Trenton, Ontario, though not a permanent squadron. This deployment is often to protect Ontario's nuclear industry. The RCAF also maintains a CF-18 Demonstration Team, a flight demonstration team which forms part of the 1 Canadian Air Division.

== Accidents and incidents ==
As of November 2016, Canada has lost at least twenty CF-18s in accidents, incurring at least eleven pilot deaths.

== Aircraft on display ==
- 188719 – CF-18A on static display at The Military Museums in Calgary, Alberta.
- 188720 – CF-18A on static display at the Musée de la Défense aérienne in Saguenay, Quebec.
- 188723 – CF-18A on static display at the Peterson Air and Space Museum at Peterson Space Force Base in Colorado Springs, Colorado.
- 188733 – CF-18A on static display at the Cold Lake Museums in Cold Lake, Alberta.
- 188901 – CF-18B on static display at the Canada Aviation and Space Museum in Ottawa, Ontario.
- 188905 – CF-18B on static display at CFB Cold Lake in Cold Lake, Alberta.
- 188911 – CF-18B on static display at the National Air Force Museum of Canada in Trenton, Ontario.
- 188914 – CF-18B nose section on static display at the Canada Aviation and Space Museum in Ottawa, Ontario.

== Specifications (CF-18) ==
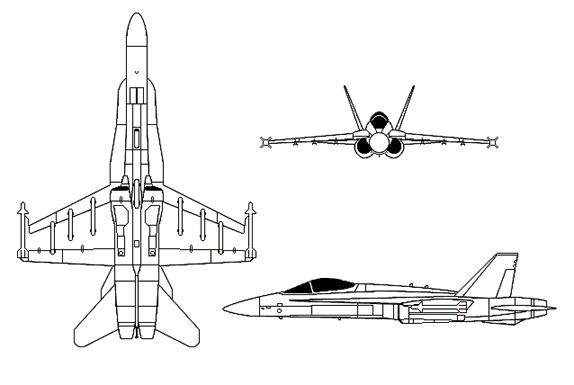
Orthographic projection of the F/A-18 Hornet

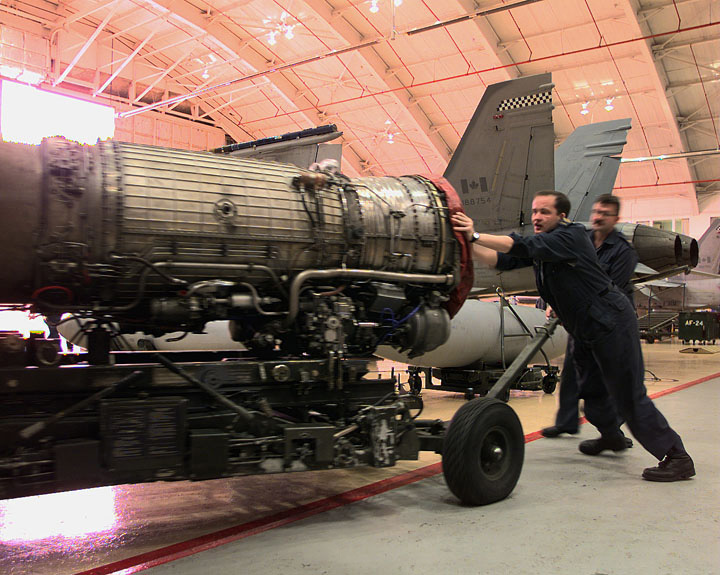
Aircraft technicians push an F404 afterburning engine through a CF-18 hangar at CFB Cold Lake, 1997.

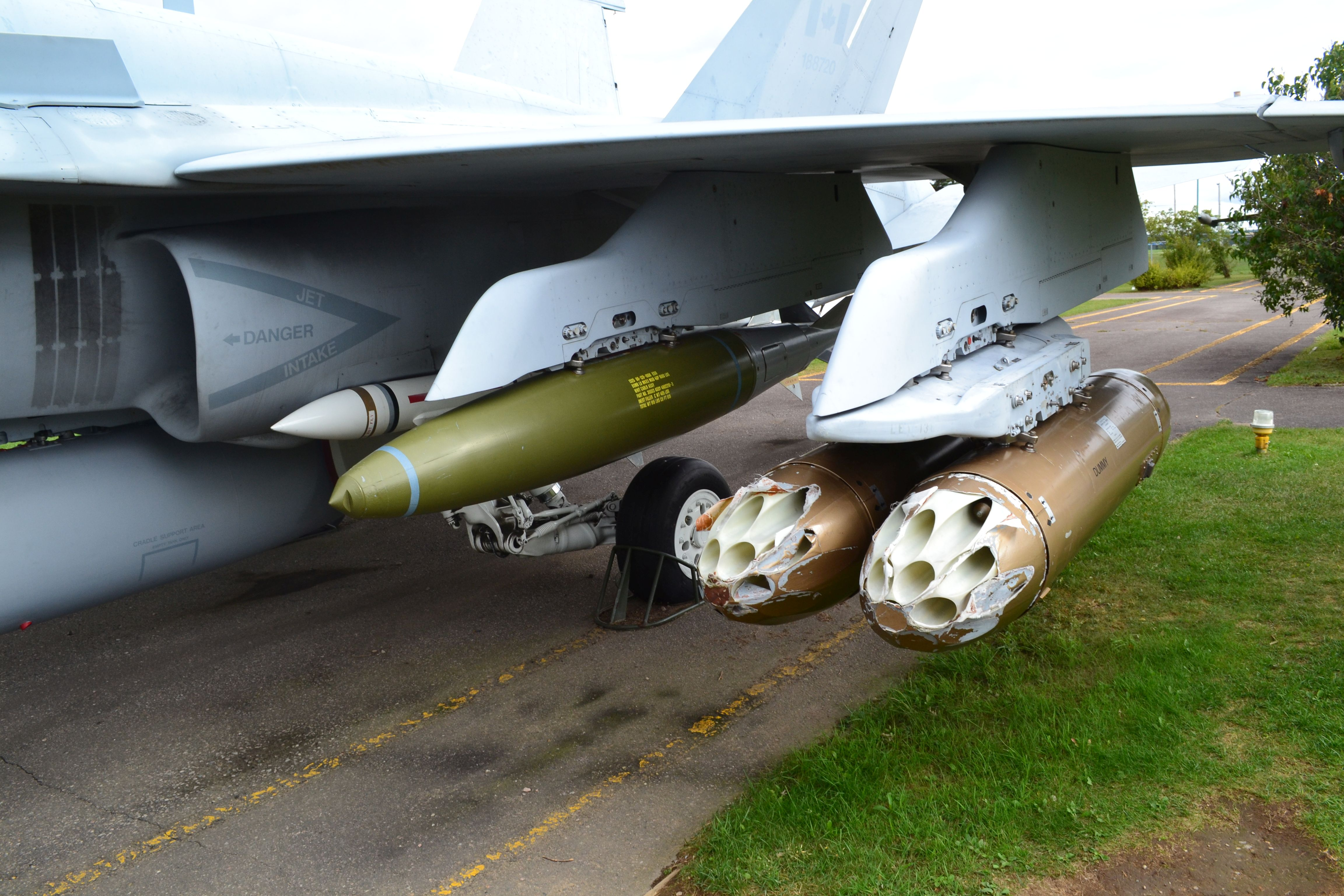
A CRV7 on a retired CF-18 at the Musée de la Défense aérienne at CFB Bagotville.

Data from CF-18 Technical Specifications

General characteristics

- Crew: 1 or 2
- Length: 56 ft 0 in (17.07 m)
- Wingspan: 40 ft 0 in (12.19 m)
- Height: 15 ft 4 in (4.67 m)
- Wing area: 400 sq ft (37 m^{2})
- Airfoil: root: NACA 65A005 mod; tip: NACA 65A003.5 mod
- Empty weight: 23,049 lb (10,455 kg)
- Gross weight: 37,150 lb (16,851 kg)
- Max takeoff weight: 51,550 lb (23,383 kg)
- Powerplant: 2 × General Electric F404-GE-400 afterburning turbofan engine, 10,000 lbf (44 kN) thrust each dry, 16,000 lbf (71 kN) with afterburner

Performance

- Maximum speed: 979.5 kn (1,127.2 mph, 1,814.0 km/h)
- Maximum speed: Mach 1.8
- Combat range: 290 nmi (330 mi, 540 km) hi-lo-lo-hi
- Ferry range: 1,800 nmi (2,100 mi, 3,300 km)
- Service ceiling: 50,000 ft (15,000 m)
- Rate of climb: 50,000 ft/min (250 m/s)

Armament

- Nine weapon/store stations (5 pylons: 1 under fuselage and 4 wing stations) carrying up to 13,700 lb (6,215 kg) of missiles, rockets, bombs, fuel tanks, and pods
  - 2 LAU 116 on sides of fuselage: deploy AIM-7 Sparrow and AIM-120 AMRAAM missiles; 2 LAU 7 on the wing tips: deploy AIM-9 Sidewinder missiles
- 1 × 20 mm M61A1 Vulcan internal rotary cannon with 578 rounds, with a firing rate of 4,000 or 6,000 rounds per minute
- Missiles and rockets:
  - Air-to-air: AIM-9 Sidewinder, AIM-120 AMRAAM, AIM-7 Sparrow missiles
  - Air-to-ground: AGM-65 Maverick missiles, CRV7 rockets
- Bombs: Mk 82, Mk 83 and Mk 84 unguided bombs; Paveway GBU-10, -12, -16, -24 laser guided bombs; JDAM GPS bomb guidance kits; AGM-154 JSOW glide bombs; and most commonly GBU-49 laser and GPS guided bombs.

Avionics

- Raytheon AN/APG-79(V)4 AESA radar
- BAE Systems AN/APX-111 IFF
- Rockwell Collins AN/ARC-210 RT-1556/ARC VHF/UHF Radio
- General Dynamics Advanced Information Systems AN/AYK-14 XN-8 mission computer
- Smiths Aerospace AN/AYQ-9 Stores Management System

== Notable appearances in media ==
The documentary television show Jetstream, which aired on Discovery Channel Canada, followed eight pilots training with the Canadian air force to fly the CF-18 at CFB Cold Lake. They trained at 410 Tactical Fighter Training Squadron.

The CF-18 is used as a primary element of the new logo for the Winnipeg Jets NHL hockey team, as an homage to the city's connection to the RCAF/CF as well as an earlier Olympic gold medal-winning team, the Ottawa RCAF Flyers. The official unveiling described the origin of the design involving the cooperation of the Department of National Defence and was inspired by the logo of the Royal Canadian Air Force. Team spokesman Dorian Morphy, Senior Director, Marketing & Brand Management of True North Sports & Entertainment indicated, "We are thrilled to be able to continue this relationship in a significant way. The design cues for the plane were inspired by the military jets flown by the Air Force over the years."

== See also ==
Related development

- Northrop YF-17
- McDonnell Douglas F/A-18 Hornet
- Boeing F/A-18E/F Super Hornet

Aircraft of comparable role, configuration, and era

- General Dynamics F-16 Fighting Falcon
- Mikoyan MiG-29
- Mirage 2000
- Saab JAS 39 Gripen
- Chengdu J-10

Related lists

- List of aircraft of Canada's air forces
- List of active Canadian military aircraft
