= New Fighter Aircraft Project =

Canadian defence procurement project

New Fighter Aircraft (NFA)
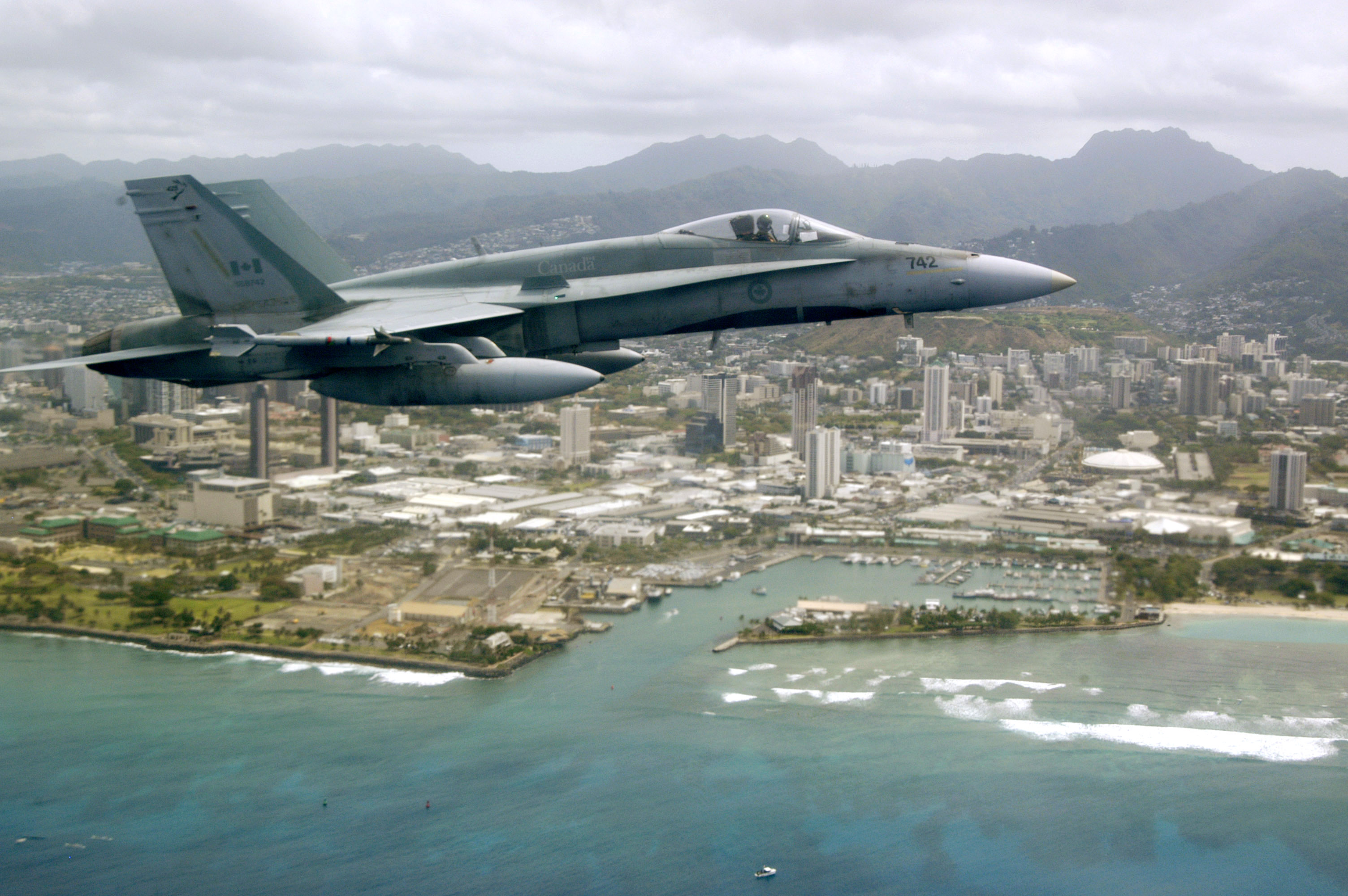
- A Canadian CF-18, winner of the NFA Project, flies off the coast of Hawaii.

General information
- Project for: Multirole fighter
- Issued by: Canadian Forces
- Proposals: General Dynamics F-16 Fighting Falcon; McDonnell Douglas F/A-18 Hornet

History
- Outcome: F/A-18 selected for production as the CF-188

The New Fighter Aircraft Project (NFA) was a Government of Canada defence procurement project undertaken in the late 1970s that saw the Department of National Defence (DND) select a single new fighter jet to replace the fleets of CF-101 Voodoo, CF-104 Starfighter and CF-116 Freedom Fighter aircraft in the Canadian Forces.

Several aircraft were considered for the project, which led to some internal friction among federal government procurement staff as different aircraft were favoured among different departments. Despite several changes of government, and after a somewhat contentious selection process starting on 17 March 1977, the McDonnell Douglas F/A-18 Hornet was selected as the winner of the NFA project on 10 April 1980. Designated the CF-18 Hornet by Canadian Forces Air Command (now called the Royal Canadian Air Force), a total of 138 aircraft were delivered between 1982 and 1988.

== History ==
=== Background ===
Air resources within the Canadian Forces had suffered from a long period of neglect and downsizing during the late 1960s and early 1970s that led to the aging of much of their military equipment. In the early 1970s the government came under increasing pressure from its NATO allies to redress this imbalance. This period came to an end in November 1975 after the governing Liberal Party of Canada's tenth National Convention saw a policy reversing defence budget cutbacks in the early 1970s and the beginning of a modernization process across the entire Canadian Forces structure; this followed a decision in September 1975 that saw all air resources within the Canadian Forces merged into a new entity called Air Command (AIRCOM). As there had been little military capital expenditure over the prior five years, modernizing the forces would be an expensive process. In order to lower fiscal spending for the ambitious program, a series of individual procurement projects were proposed to be spread out over the five-year period from 1977 to 1982.

During the 1970s, the Canadian Forces was tasked with four primary military duties; air defence of North America as part of NORAD, anti-submarine and related duties in the North Atlantic as part of NATO, a small role within the overall land-force structure of NATO in Western Europe, and the specialist role of reinforcing Norway with one brigade and all required air, sea and other support that might be needed for that mission (collectively known as "CAST"). With the exception of air transport, equipment for all of these tasks was deemed to be lacking.

Six procurement projects became the initial focus of the late 1970s upgrade process. For Maritime Command (MARCOM) a new "Long Range Patrol Aircraft Project" (LRPA) would dramatically increase their anti-submarine capabilities, while a new "Patrol Frigate Project" would supplement the recently procured and extremely capable Iroquois-class destroyer. Force Mobile Command needed a new main battle tank to replace the outdated Centurion as well as new command and logistics vehicles. Force Mobile Command also identified the need for a new tactical ground attack aircraft to support Canada's ground forces in Western Europe, while the newly created Air Command needed a new aircraft to replace their somewhat motley collection of increasingly dated fighter and interceptor aircraft. Inter-service priorities were quickly decided.

First up was the Long Range Patrol Aircraft Project (LRPA), eventually filled by the Lockheed CP-140 Aurora, a modified version of the P-3 Orion. Problems that arose during the LRPA project were particularly worrying for the other procurement initiatives. The LRPA project had initially settled on the Orion in November 1975, however, the project was cancelled in May 1976, before being re-instated at a later date. In 1978 the Minister of Supply and Services, Jean-Pierre Goyer, stated that he had been deliberately misled on the topic, a claim that led to a slander lawsuit. A breakdown in communications between the various departments led to the budget request being $300 million smaller than was needed in startup costs, delaying service entry. Adding to the LRPA project's woes, the procurement procedure resulted in the addition of various "required features" that led to the aircraft's sensor suite being modified at considerable expense, a problem known in military circles as "gold plating".

=== NFA ===
The need for a new high-performance fighter was next on the list of priorities for the government's Department of National Defence (DND). With the problems in the LRPA project still ongoing, it was imperative that the NFA project avoid these issues at all costs. There was serious concern that the DND would be considered incapable of handling its newly increased budget if problems resulting from the LRPA project continued. In this case, they might be stripped of their direction over the purchasing process, or at least face a shake up within the ranks. Immediately following the NFA project would be the new Canadian Patrol Frigate Project (CPF), and if the NFA project ran into the same sorts of problems as the LRPA project, the CPF project would likely suffer from budgetary constraints, downsizing, or potential cancellation.

In order to avoid these possibilities, DND put into place a number of new policies for the NFA project aimed at ensuring the established budget would be followed. For one, the NFA project demanded that whatever aircraft was selected would have to be completely "off the shelf", in order to avoid "gold plating" problems that had driven up the price of the LRPA. Additionally, the NFA project would request a budget that included all costs; training, spares, even the 12% import taxes that would have to be paid to the federal Department of Finance and any similar fees that might have to be paid to the foreign government to offset research and development they had spent on the program.

Finally, a NFA project office was set up to ensure that all three stakeholders would have their requirements fairly presented in the procurement. Under the LRPA project the various departments responsible for coordinating military procurement reported to DND, however, under the NFA project they all co-managed a new NFA Project Office (NFA/PO). This ensured that the technical requirements of the DND would not override the budgetary ones of the federal Department of Supply and Services (DSS), nor the industrial benefits package required by the federal Department of Industry, Trade and Commerce (DITC). All three proposed aircraft considered for the NFA project would be considered peers, and the NFA project staff's work would be overseen by a group of deputy ministers and senior bureaucrats from the federal Department of External Affairs, the Treasury Board of Canada Secretariat and the Privy Council Office.

=== Selection process ===
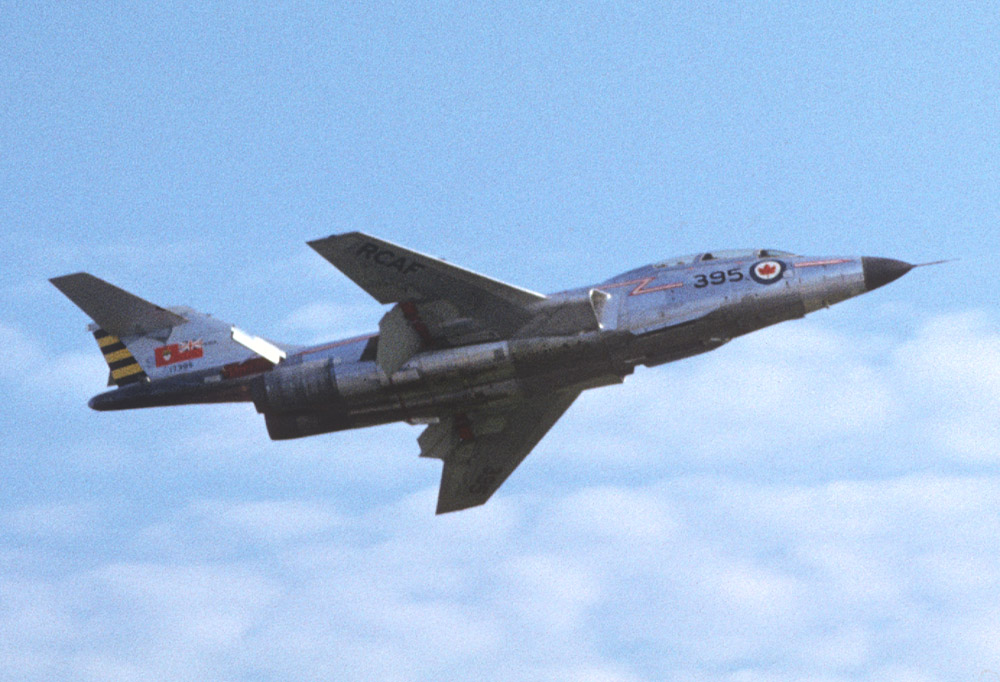
The CF-101 Voodoo was Canada's primary air defense platform, but was aging and needed to be replaced.

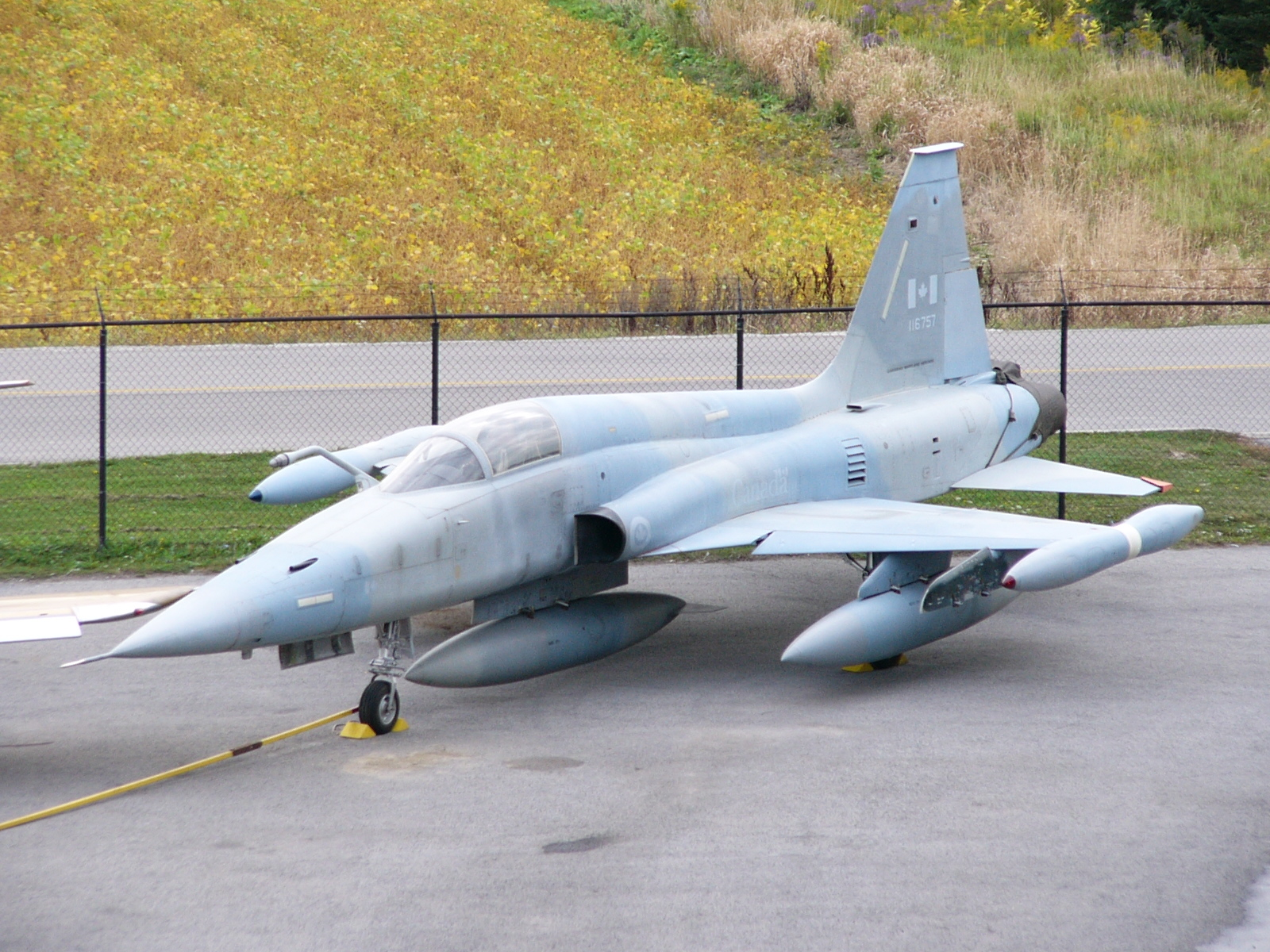
The Freedom Fighter was new and inexpensive, but had very limited air-to-air capability, especially at night.

The existing AIRCOM fleet consisted of the CF-101 Voodoo as the primary all-weather interceptor for duties within the NORAD framework, the CF-104 Starfighter as the primary day fighter and tactical attack aircraft in Europe, and the CF-116 Freedom Fighter supplementing both in multiple roles. By the late 1970s the Voodoo was considered outdated and growing increasingly expensive to operate and maintain, given its tube-based electronics. None of its primary systems - missiles, radar or engines - were still being used in other operational aircraft in the Canadian Forces or its allies, and spares had to be taken from mothballed units. The CF-104 Starfighter was originally the day counterpart to the CF-101 Voodoo and it had also served a nuclear-strike role when that was the basis for most military thinking in NATO. Since 1971 the nuclear weapons role of the Canadian Forces had been abandoned, and since then the CF-104 Starfighter saw its mission switched primarily to a low-level strike role that it was not particularly well suited to. The CF-116 Freedom Fighter was considerably more modern, but was a much simpler aircraft that was useful primarily in a supporting light strike role.

The goal of the NFA project was to select a single multi-purpose aircraft that could fill all of the roles of the existing fleet, while also reducing operational costs and improving availability and capability. In the fifteen years since the CF-104s had been procured, there had been significant advancements in engines, aerodynamics and especially mission electronics to permit all of these roles to be combined in a single multi-role aircraft. A number of such designs were in the process of being introduced by air forces around the world. Of particular interest was the recent Lightweight Fighter (LWF) project in the United States that had produced the F-16 Fighting Falcon for the United States Air Force (USAF), an aircraft of such versatility that it had rapidly generated orders from other air forces around the world in what American public broadcaster PBS described as "The Sale of the Century."

In September 1977 the NFA project office published a four-volume request for proposals (RFP), each volume outlining one area of interest. These included the technical specifications, risk mitigation, costs, the industrial benefit program and contractual obligations. In a subsequent decision, the NFA project budget was limited to around $2.34 billion [CAD] to procure between 130 and 150 aircraft, ideally as many as possible within the budget. This represented a decrease in fleet numbers; there were 66 CF-101 Voodoo and 200 CF-104 Starfighter aircraft being replaced by less than half that number of NFA aircraft. Cabinet officially approved the NFA budget on 27 November 1977.

The RFP was sent to six companies who had aircraft that might fit the requirements; the Grumman Aerospace Corporation's F-14 Tomcat, McDonnell Douglas Corporation's F-15 Eagle and F/A-18, Northrop Corporation's F-18L (a Northrop-only stripped-down version of the joint Northrop and McDonnell Douglas F/A-18), General Dynamic Corporation's F-16, Dassault-Breguet's Mirage F1 and the Panavia Tornado. The NFA project quickly eliminated the F-14, F-15, and the Tornado due to the high purchase prices. The Mirage F1 was withdrawn as it could not compete with the others in performance terms, however, Dassault-Breguet proposed the Mirage 2000 in its place. This proposal was not received by the February 1, 1978 cut-off date imposed by the NFA project, thus in 1978, the NFA project short listed just three aircraft; the F-16, the F-18L and the F/A-18.

=== A contender is eliminated ===
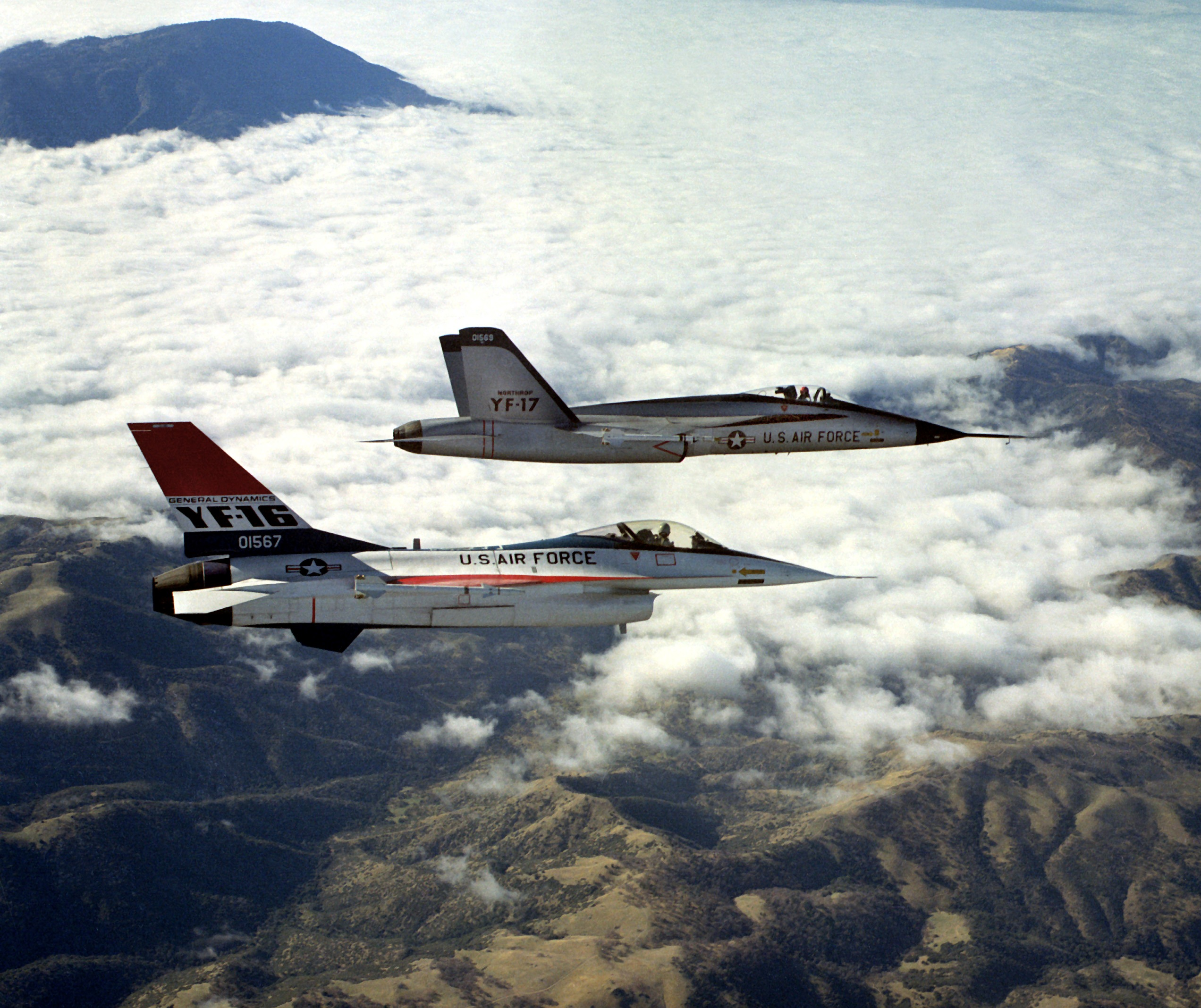
The original LWF contenders, a YF-16 flies beside a YF-17.

The F/A-18 had started life as the Northrop F-17 Cobra, a direct competitor to the F-16 during the LWF competition. When the United States Navy expressed an interest in a new multi-role fighter jet under their VFAX project, the United States Congress instead cancelled VFAX and demanded that the U.S. Navy use one of the LWF aircraft under a new program called the "Navy Air Combat Fighter Project" (NACF). Accordingly, the U.S. Navy asked for proposals for versions of the two aircraft with various carrier-based features, including arrestor hooks, catapult bars, folding wings and dramatically strengthened landing gear and fuselage. Another requirement was that the entries would have to be built by companies with recent naval aircraft experience, however, neither General Dynamics nor Northrop had built a carrier aircraft for some time. Both partnered with other companies for the modified design; General Dynamics with Ling-Temco-Vought for what would be termed the F-16N, and Northrop with McDonnell Douglas for what would become the F/A-18.

Among the many features that fighter jets used by the U.S. Navy for carrier operations required was the ability to quickly "spool up" their engines to full power. Should the aircraft miss the arrestor wires as it attempts to land on a carrier, there is no way that it can stop in time and must immediately add power for a go-around. This is not a minor concern; it occurs so commonly that such a landing has its own name, a "bolter". Generally speaking, the rate that an engine can be spooled up is roughly a function of its cross-sectional size, so an otherwise identical aircraft mounting two smaller engines instead of one larger one will typically have much better throttle response. For this reason, among others, the U.S. Navy favored the two-engine layout of the F-18 from the start, and selected it as the winner of NACF project in 1976.

When the two companies joined forces for the F/A-18, part of the agreement was that Northrop would develop a land-based version of the F/A-18 that removed the naval equipment and lightened the airframe. The resulting F-18L was about 30% lighter than the F/A-18A, about 27400 lb (12400 kg) take-off weight as opposed to 33700 lb (15300 kg) and as a result had considerably better performance and range. The aircraft was over 80% similar otherwise, and would be built on the same production lines. Naval versions (the F/A-18 Hornet) would be built 60% by McDonnell and 40% by Northrop, while the land versions would reverse this arrangement.

Like the U.S. Navy, the upper echelons of the Canadian Forces Air Command (AIRCOM) also favoured having an aircraft with two engines, although for different reasons. Additionally, AIRCOM was adamant about having the ability to fire the medium-range AIM-7 Sparrow air-to-air missile. Neither the F-16 Falcon nor the YF-17 Cobra supported the Sparrow, in keeping with the short-range "dogfighter" role as originally envisioned. The U.S. Navy had also demanded support for the Sparrow, as they were less interested in fighter-to-fighter combat as they were in long-range interception of both aircraft and anti-shipping missiles. Both aircraft in the LWF project studied supporting longer-range radar as part of their naval modifications, but as the F-16 modification never proceeded beyond the mockup stage, only the F/A-18 actually added AIM-7 support. (Note: The F-16 later gained AIM-7 Sparrow support as part of the U.S. Air National Guard's request for a Sparrow-firing fighter that resulted in the F-16 ADF. The other contender was the F-20 Tigershark.) This put the two F-18 variants in the lead from the start.

From a strict technical point of view the F-18L (the Northrop version) was the better aircraft for the NFA project, with performance roughly equal to the F-16, Sparrow capability, and the twin-engine design that the Canadian Forces favored. Compared to the F/A-18A (the McDonnell Douglas version), its lower weight and resulting better range would also be very useful in the air defence role over Canada. The F-18L was also offered with a lucrative industrial program; Northrop agreed to move major portions of the F-18L project to Canada, including investing in carbon composite construction techniques to build the wings and tail sections. If accepted, Canada would become the primary construction site for all of these components, which meant that any additional orders for the F-18L from other countries would result in major export contracts for Canadian companies.

Unsurprisingly, the federal Department of Industry, Trade and Commerce (DITC) strongly favored the F-18L offer for the industrial benefits to the Canadian economy. However, contrary to the original conception of the NFA project office, DITC had only two full-time staff in the office compared to dozens from the Department of National Defence (DND) and the Department of Supply and Services (DSS). Both of the other groups expressed concerns about the offer. As there appeared to be no orders from the United States for the F-18L variant, any production run would be based on the Canadian procurement and any potential exports. Several other countries had expressed a similar interest in the F-18L, notably Greece, Turkey, Spain and Australia, but none of these were a "sure thing." If these deals did not go through, Canada would be the only operator of the aircraft, something DND considered completely unacceptable. Likewise, DSS's primary interest was iron-clad contracts with predictable delivery time frames and budgets, and strongly supported the "off the shelf" requirement. Therefore, in October 1978 the NFA project office overrode DITC's concerns and reduced the list to only the F-16 and the F/A-18A, a decision that the federal cabinet accepted on 23 November 1978.

At the time there was some talk of going ahead with the F-18L based on the potential Canadian order alone. Several other air forces were in the process of looking at similar aircraft, and the upgrades carried out during the conversion from the F-17 to the F/A-18 made the F-18L a much more worthy competitor to the F-16 in the export market. However, Northrop found themselves constantly being outmaneuvered by the McDonnell Douglas sales team who would make counteroffers whenever the F-18L was proposed for foreign sales. This eventually led to a lawsuit between the companies, which was settled in 1985 with McDonnell Douglas agreeing to pay Northrop $50 million for complete rights to the design without admitting wrongdoing. By then Northrop had ended work on F-18L.

=== Selecting the winner ===
With the elimination of the F-18L on November 23, 1978, the NFA project moved into its final phase. In order to expedite the eventual order, the NFA project office started negotiating contracts with both companies with the understanding that one would be selected once a final decision had been made. This led to intensive investigations of the industrial offset programs.

General Dynamics was somewhat limited in their offers due to similar arrangements made with European countries, which stated that 15% of all aircraft delivered to 3rd party countries, including Canada, would have to be built in Europe. This would not be insurmountable, but definitely presented some problems in negotiations.

Douglas (prior to the formation of McDonnell Douglas) had been building tail assemblies for the DC-9 at the former Avro Canada factories at the Toronto International Airport for some time. Their industrial offset program would include modernizing these plants and moving in additional work to include wings for the KC-10 and MD-11, wings, empennage and cabin floors for the MD-80, as well as side panels and pylons for the F/A-18.

This proposal was greatly worrying to the DITC, and they became much more active in the negotiations. Their concern was based on existing Defence Production Sharing Agreement (DPSA) between the United States and Canada that was put in place to balance the amount of trade in military goods between the countries. A major procurement like the NFA meant the United States either had to purchase a similar amount of military equipment from Canada, or alternately offset the purchase though military production in Canada. A program like Northrop's F-18L was purely military in nature, so any production in Canada would be counted against this balance, but the McDonnell Douglas offer was mostly in civilian goods, which had to be accounted separately. McDonnell was adamant that their DC-9 and DC-10 work be counted against the balance, an attitude the Canadians described as "insistent". The DITC was concerned that the U.S. government would have to be persuaded to re-negotiate the agreement in this case, or make a large military purchase. Neither option seemed straightforward, and would have placed a burden on the DITC's dealings in the future.

While the negotiations with McDonnell Douglas were continuing, Air Canada announced it was purchasing the Lockheed L-1011 to add to its wide-body fleet. This greatly angered James Smith McDonnell, the chief executive officer of McDonnell Douglas, who personally threatened to cancel his company's participation in the NFA project. Neither DND and DSS wanted this to happen, and wanted both the F-16 and F/A-18 aircraft to remain in contention for the NFA project. However, these concerns were later muted when a report was leaked that suggested the F/A-18 was favoured to win the NFA project, and it appeared that the DITC's concerns were going to be overridden. As a result, McDonnell Douglas became much less vocal about the Air Canada purchase.

Contract negotiations went on throughout 1978 and 1979, continuing through two federal elections. The proposed contracts were finalized by June, when then new Progressive Conservative Party of Canada formed a minority government. A lengthy review of the contracts followed, and was completed in early December. These were tabled to be signed off on December 14, however, on the 13th the Progressive Conservative government failed a vote of non-confidence and the NFA project was set aside. The Liberal Party of Canada was elected to a majority government in the ensuing elections, and on February 19, 1980, formal negotiations for the NFA project started again.

Rumours that the F/A-18 was the winner had surfaced by this point, and General Dynamics started a campaign to have the selection discarded. As part of their industrial program, the Pratt & Whitney F100 engines used in the F-16 would be built at Pratt & Whitney Canada in Quebec, which would have been a major windfall for that province. In late March René Lévesque of the governing Parti Québécois publicly announced that the F-16 should be selected because it would provide Quebec with considerably more than the competing McDonnell Douglas offer. This led to a meeting between several interested parties in the federal government on April 9, 1980, and after transferring several million dollars from federal projects in Ontario to Quebec the objections disappeared. Among these, General Electric agreed to open a plant in Quebec that would produce turbine fan blades for commercial engines.

The following day (April 10, 1980) the F/A-18 Hornet was officially announced as the winner of the NFA project. On 16 April the procurement contracts were signed, with a ceiling of $2.369 billion (USD) for 137 aircraft, and an industrial package of C$2.453 billion to be invested by McDonnell Douglas in Canada over a period ending in 1995.

=== Aftermath ===
The next day (April 11, 1980) the federal government ran a series of advertisements in national newspapers to explain their choice for the NFA project. The arguments focused primarily on the financial aspects of the deal. Despite the higher unit cost of the F/A-18 Hornet, the industrial program would more than pay for the entire program. Reasons for the selection listed by the Canadian Forces included two engines for reliability (considered essential for conducting Arctic sovereignty and over-the-water patrols), an excellent radar set, and a lower cost than the F-14 or F-15. Nevertheless, the press was skeptical of the program, particularly its aircraft carrier-based design, even though Canada operated no aircraft carriers. As the CBC's As It Happens noted, the F/A-18 could not even fly from Toronto to Montreal without carrying extra fuel.

In spite of outward appearances, the selection of the F/A-18 Hornet for the NFA project was not a "sure thing". The contract had been left open to the very last minute and continued to see changes even in the weeks immediately before the selection was announced. Additionally, the F-14 almost ended up being purchased from Iran, as their fleet was facing the prospect of falling into disuse due to a lack of spares in the aftermath of the Iranian Revolution. Canadian diplomats tried to convince the Iranians to sell its fleet of eighty almost-new fighters at cut-rate prices. However, the negotiations fell through in the aftermath of the Canadian caper in which six American diplomats were smuggled out of Iran from the Canadian embassy.

Several changes were made to the program in the following years. The government came under increasing criticism for replacing a large number of aircraft with a much smaller one, a number that would not allow the forces to provide both their NORAD role as well as their ground attack role in Europe. Over the next months a deal was worked out with the US government that dropped $70 million from the price of each aircraft's embedded R&D costs, in exchange for the promise to buy additional aircraft to the same total cost. This raised the purchase to 137 aircraft, eight more than originally planned. The same deal also allowed the purchase of an additional 20 "attrition aircraft" without paying any R&D, reducing the price by $880,000 per aircraft.

A total of 138 aircraft, designated the CF-188 Hornet, were delivered to Canada from 1982 to 1988.
