= CFB Bagotville =

Royal Canadian Air Force base in Quebec

CFB Bagotville
- Base des Forces canadiennes Bagotville
- Near Saguenay, Quebec, in Canada
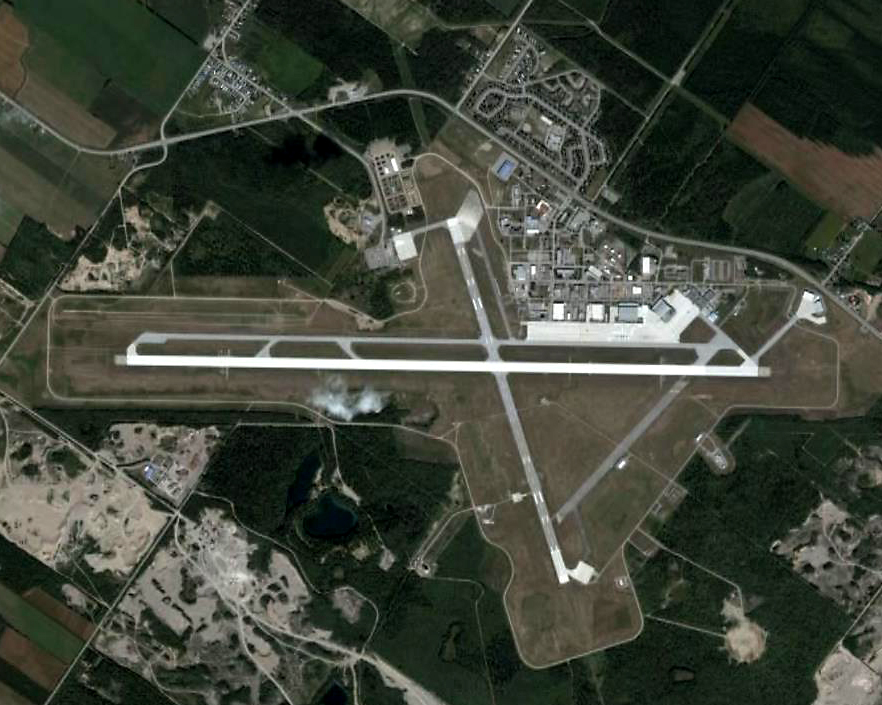
- A satellite view of CFB Bagotville

Site information
- Type: Canadian Forces base
- Owner: Department of National Defence; City of Saguenay (civil terminal)
- Operator: Royal Canadian Air Force
- Controlled by: 1 Canadian Air Division
- Condition: Operational
- Website: Official website

Location
- Location in Quebec
- Coordinates: 48°19′50″N 070°59′47″W

Site history
- Built: 1941 – 1942
- In use: 1942 – present

Garrison information
- Current commander: Colonel Phillip Rennison
- Garrison: 3 Wing

Airfield information
- Identifiers: IATA: YBG, ICAO: CYBG, WMO: 717270
- Elevation: 159 m (522 ft) AMSL
Runways
Direction	Length and surface
11/29	3,000 m (10,000 ft) asphalt / concrete
18/36	1,838 m (6,029 ft) asphalt
- Airfield shared with Bagotville Airport (Aéroport Saguenay-Bagotville); Source: Canada Flight Supplement

Canadian Forces Base Bagotville (IATA: YBG, ICAO: CYBG), commonly referred to as CFB Bagotville, and also known as Bagotville Airport or Saguenay-Bagotville Airport, is a Canadian Forces base 4.5 nautical miles (8.3 km; 5.2 mi) west of Bagotville in the city of Saguenay. Located in the centre of Quebec, less than 200 km (120 mi) north of Quebec City, CFB Bagotville is operated as an air force base by the Royal Canadian Air Force (RCAF) and is one of two bases in the country using the CF-18 Hornet fighter/interceptor, the other being CFB Cold Lake. Its primary RCAF lodger units are 2 Wing and 3 Wing.

CFB Bagotville's airfield is also used by civilian aircraft, with civilian operations at the base referring to the facility as Saguenay-Bagotville Airport (French: Aéroport Saguenay-Bagotville). The airport is classified as an airport of entry by Nav Canada and is staffed by the Canada Border Services Agency (CBSA). CBSA officers can handle civilian aircraft with no more than 30 passengers between 0800-1630 on weekdays.

As of 2018, approximately 1,700 military and civilian people work at CFB Bagotville.

A quick reaction facility is being built to support the new Lockheed Martin F-35 Lightning II fighters.

== History ==
=== World War II (1941–1945) ===
At the height of the Second World War, the RCAF selected a relatively level farming area at the head of navigable waters in the Saguenay River to be the site of several aerodromes during 1941. This area was considered useful for RCAF purposes, given the amount of cleared land in the region, its relative geographic isolation and proximity to the deepwater port of Port-Alfred, as well as access to the adjacent railway network. Construction began that summer and continued through the winter and following spring on RCAF Station St-Honoré near Chicoutimi and RCAF Station Bagotville in La Baie.

The base at St-Honoré opened in June 1942, followed by Bagotville on 17 July 1942; St-Honoré being operated as a sub-base to Bagotville. RCAF Station Bagotville hosted the 1 Operational Training Unit (1 OTU) which trained pilots from Commonwealth nations under the British Commonwealth Air Training Plan (BCATP), as well as the 130 Panthère Squadron, which was an operational RCAF air defence unit intended to protect the massive Alcan aluminum smelter in nearby Arvida (one of the largest industrial facilities in Canada at the time), and associated hydro-electric facilities in the Saguenay region. During 1942 Quebec's coastal regions along the lower Saint Lawrence River and Gulf of Saint Lawrence were witnessing the Battle of the St. Lawrence as German U-boats were sinking Canadian shipping throughout the area. RCAF Station Bagotville was established, along with RCAF Station Mont-Joli to counter the U-boat menace to Canada's war effort and placate local fears.

Early training aircraft operating from RCAF Station Bagotville included Curtiss Kittyhawk, Westland Lysander, North American Harvard and Hawker Hurricane. 130 Squadron, which was deployed at the base to provide regional air defence to key industrial facilities, used the motto "Défendez le Saguenay", which was later adopted by the entire base. On 1 August 1942 the 12 Radar Detachment was deployed to provide air traffic control. On 24 October 1943 129 Squadron took over from 130 Squadron as the regional air defence unit; two months later in December 129 Squadron was redeployed from Saguenay and the 1 OTU was retasked with regional air defence duties.

Toward the end of the war, RCAF Station Bagotville began to decline in activity as the requirement for BCATP training decreased. On 28 October 1944 the 1 OTU ceased operations, followed by the 12 Radar Detachment. In 29 pilot training courses given by 1 OTU at RCAF Station Bagotville (and St-Honoré), 940 pilots graduated and 41 were killed during training.

In November 1944 1 OTU was disbanded and the closure of RCAF Station Bagotville and its secondary facilities at RCAF Station St-Honoré was announced; they were closed and mothballed on 5 January 1945.

==== Aerodrome ====
In approximately 1942 the aerodrome was listed as RCAF Aerodrome - Saguenay, Province of Quebec at 48°20′N 71°00′W with a variation of 23 degrees E and elevation of 510 ft (160 m). Three runways were listed as follows:

Runway name	Length	Width	Surface
6/24	4,000 ft (1,200 m)	150 ft (46 m)	Hard surfaced
11/29	4,975 ft (1,516 m)	150 ft (46 m)	Hard surfaced
18/36	4,000 ft (1,200 m)	150 ft (46 m)	Hard surfaced

=== Cold War (1951–1993) ===
The escalating tensions brought about by the Cold War and the Korean War saw RCAF Station Bagotville reactivated on 1 July 1951 as a training base for air defence squadrons deploying in support of NATO's defence of western Europe from the Warsaw Pact. Two squadrons, 413 and 414, initially operated at Bagotville using De Havilland Vampire and F-86 Sabre aircraft ( * logs from 413 during this period detail no Vampires, only Sabres, Harvard, T33 and Expeditor). During this time squadrons were deployed on Operation Appletree visiting a number of cities and towns in the Maritimes, Quebec and Ontario, and to the Toronto CNE to promote the RCAF. 2 Flying Officers were lost; F/O Robert Verne "Hank" Snow and Robert "Mongoose" Moncrieff. There were other incidences of engine failures requiring emergency procedures. On 7 March 1953 both squadrons deployed to Europe on the month long Leapfrog III and the base was quiet through the rest of that year.

No. 431 (Fighter) Squadron re-formed at RCAF Station Bagotville on 18 January 1954 using the Sabre. The squadron was formed on a temporary basis until there were enough new CF-100s available to fulfill RCAF squadron needs and was deactivated on 1 October 1954. Also in 1954 432 and 440 squadrons were transferred to RCAF Station Bagotville flying the CF-100 Canuck all-weather fighter. In 1957 440 squadron deployed to RCAF Station Zweibrücken in West Germany and on 1 May 1957 413 squadron returned to the base flying the Canuck. That year also saw the CT-133 Silver Star arrive at the base as a training aircraft.

In 1961, 413 and 432 squadrons disbanded and 416 Squadron was formed at Bagotville flying the CF-101 Voodoo. 416 squadron was moved to RCAF Station Chatham the following year in 1962. In summer of 1962 the 425 Alouette squadron transferred to RCAF Station Bagotville flying the Voodoo; its aircraft were modified to carry the AIR-2 Genie - a nuclear-tipped air-to-air missile, with nuclear warheads being stored at Bagotville until the weapon's decommissioning in the early 1980s. On 1 February 1968 the RCAF merged with the Royal Canadian Navy and Canadian Army to form the Canadian Armed Forces; RCAF Station Bagotville changed its name to Canadian Forces Base Bagotville.

Later that year 410 squadron formed at CFB Bagotville to provide training. In September 1969 433 "Porc-Épic" squadron was transferred to Bagotville flying the CF-116 Freedom Fighter. In 1982 410 squadron moved to CFB Cold Lake and was replaced by 434 "Bluenose" squadron.

On 1 July 1984 425 squadron changed from the CF-101 Voodoo to the CF-188 Hornet. On 9 July 1985 434 squadron moved to CFB Chatham. In 1986 433 squadron ceased operations to restructure and reactivated in January 1988 equipped with the CF-188 Hornet.

=== 1993–present ===
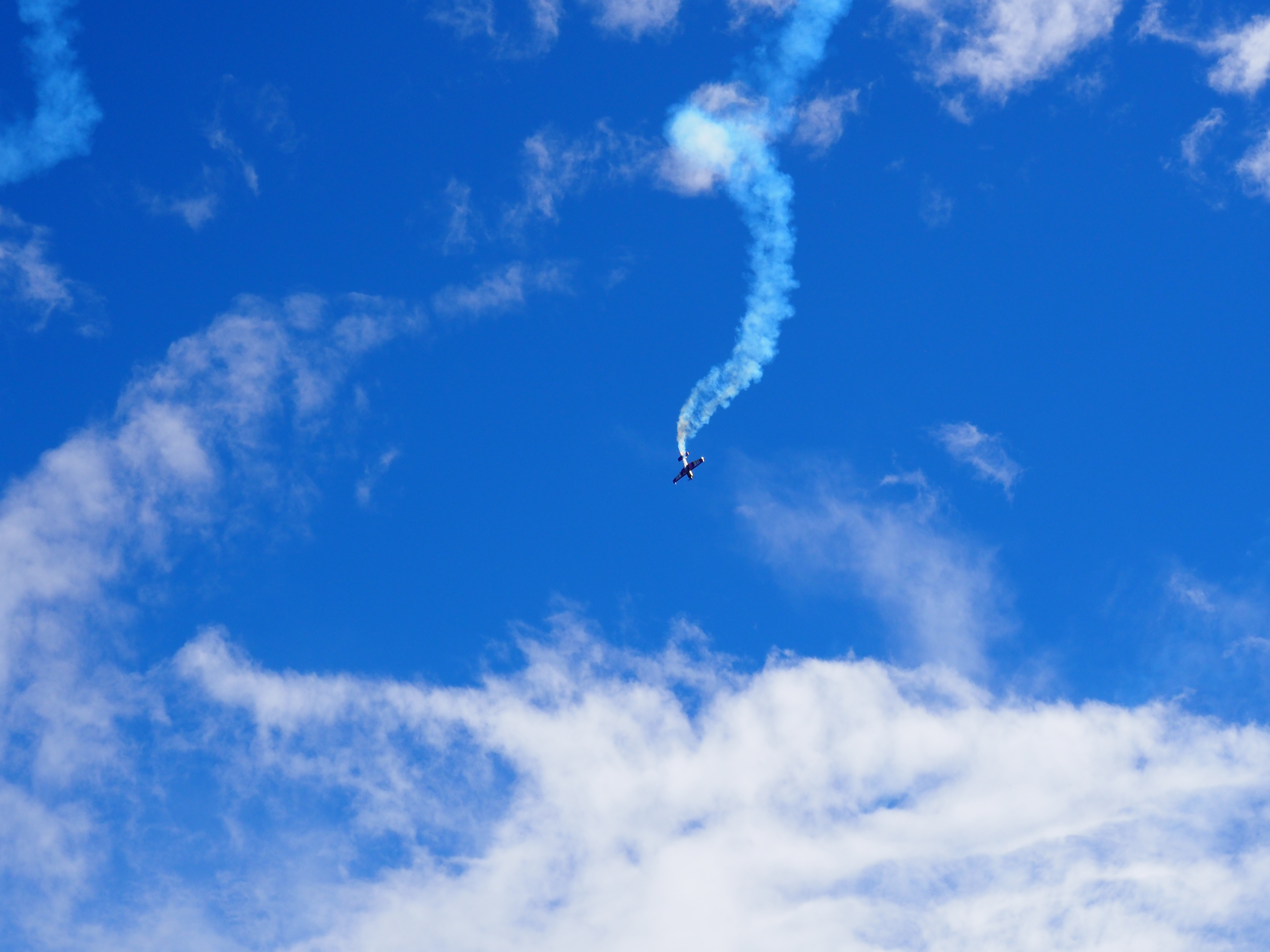
Aerobatic performance at the Bagotville International Air Show in 2017

On 1 April 1993 CFB Bagotville became home to 3 Wing, which administers all Air Command units on base. The same day 439 "Tiger" squadron was reformed from elements of the existing Base Flight Bagotville, flying the CT-133 Silver Star and CH-118 Huey. The CT-133 fleet was retired in 2001 and in 1996 439 squadron's four CH-118s were replaced by three CH-146 Griffons. ✗

In July 1996, the base helped locals during the Saguenay flood.

On 1 March 1999, 12 Radar Squadron was formed at CFB Bagotville to provide tactical control of fighter/interceptor aircraft; it replaced a radar station at RCAF Station Mont Apica which was closed.

433 Squadron disbanded in 2006 with its aircraft and personnel absorbed by 425 Squadron as a dual language Francophone/Anglophone unit. The squadron was reactivated on 9 June 2015.

On 2 October 2020, the Government of Canada awarded EllisDon-EBC Inc. Joint Venture of Ottawa with the $12.1 million construction of new facilities to house the Royal Canadian Air Force's Future Fighter. The Future Fighter, to be housed at CFB Cold Lake and CFB Bagotville, will require facility upgrades before the first delivery of the fighter in 2025. A $131 million contract was awarded to construct a 15,000 m^{2} facility to house the 2 Air Expeditionary Wing. The construction began in 2023.

==== Present units ====
The base is associated with NORAD

As of 2023 CFB Bagotville has the following squadrons and units:

- 2 Wing Bagotville
  - 2 Mission Support Squadron
  - 2 Air Expeditionary Training Squadron
  - 2 Operational Support Squadron
  - 4 Construction Engineering Squadron
  - 8 Air Communication and Control Squadron
  - 2 Air Support Operations Squadron
  - 14 Construction Engineering Squadron
- 3 Wing Bagotville
  - 425 Tactical Fighter Squadron (CF-18)
  - 433 Tactical Fighter Squadron (CF-18)
  - 439 Combat Support Squadron (CH-146 Griffon)
  - 3 Air Maintenance Squadron
  - 12 Radar Squadron
  - 3 Wing Air Reserve Flight
  - Forward Operating Location Iqaluit

Bagotville also supports 414 Electronic Warfare Support Squadron. Re-formed on 20 January 2009 this squadron is based in Ottawa and is composed of military electronic warfare officers who fulfill the combat support role, flying on civilian contracted aircraft.

The Dassault/Dornier Alpha Jets that form part of Top Aces fleet are based here as part of the CF jet training program Contracted Airborne Training Services.

CFB Bagotville hosts the Bagotville Cadets Canada Summer Training Centre. Air and Sea Cadets from across Canada attend the summer training centre to qualify in a variety of courses ranging from the two-week Aviation and Aerospace Technology course, the four-week Advanced Aviation course, to the six-week Sailing II/III course .

== International commitments ==
- North American Aerospace Defense Command (NORAD)
- NATO
- UNO

== Airlines and destinations ==
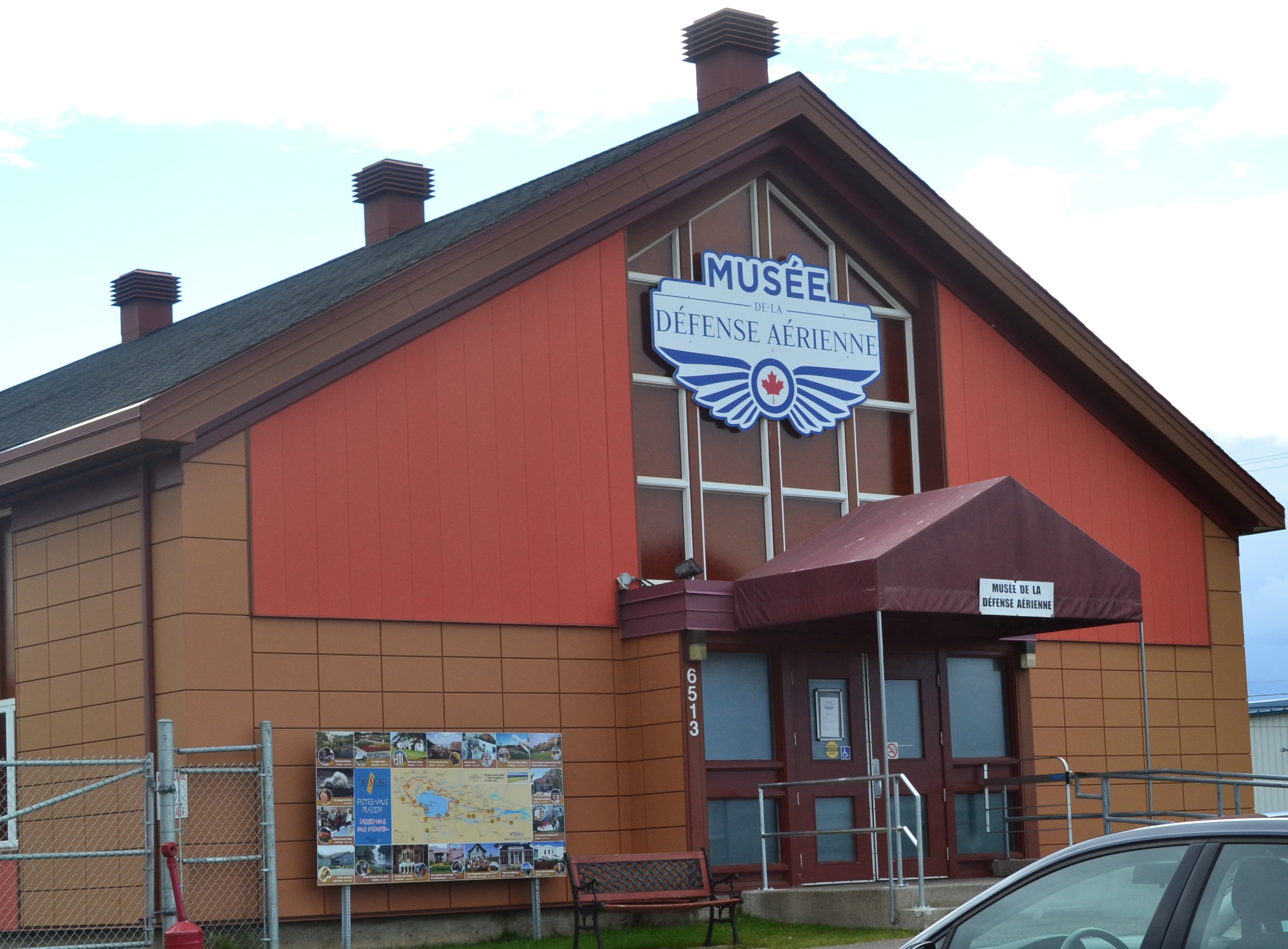
The Musée de la Défense aérienne

Airlines	Destinations
Air Canada Express	Montréal–Trudeau
WestJet	Seasonal: Cancún

== Museum ==
The base is also home to the Musée de la Défense aérienne. A number of Canadian and foreign military aircraft are on static display outside of the main museum building.

== International Air Show Bagotville ==
Since 1953 the base has hosted an air show on a biannual schedule. The event is known as the International air show of Bagotville. Each air show showcases various military aircraft, including those of the Royal Canadian Air Force. The air show averages 100,000 visitors over the weekend.
