= Quam Lake =

Lake in the state of Minnesota, United States

- Location within Minnesota
- Location: Douglas County, Minnesota
- Coordinates: 45°52′57″N 95°39′35″W
- Type: lake
- Surface area: 178 acres (72 ha)
- Max. depth: 14 feet (4.3 m)
- Surface elevation: 400 meters (1,300 ft)

Quam Lake is a lake in Douglas County, in the U.S. state of Minnesota.

Quam Lake was named for P. J. Quam.

== See also ==
- List of lakes in Minnesota
