= Quebec Aerospace Museum =

Canadian museum

- Musée de l’aérospatiale du Québec
- Established: 23 August 2018
- Location: Hangar H-18, Montreal Saint-Hubert Longueuil Airport, Saint-Hubert, Quebec, Canada
- Coordinates: 45°31′44″N 73°24′29″W
- Type: Aviation museum
- Founders: Pierre Gillard, Gilbert McCauley and Éric Tremblay
- Director General: Pierre Gillard
- Website: www.maq-qam.ca

The Quebec Aerospace Museum (French: Musée de l’aérospatiale du Québec) is an aviation museum, located in hangar H-18 at the Montreal Saint-Hubert Longueuil Airport in Saint-Hubert, Quebec, Canada, a borough in the city of Longueuil. It was founded on 23 August 2018 as a not-for-profit society.

== History ==
The museum was founded by Pierre Gillard, Gilbert McCauley and Éric Tremblay, with Gillard assuming the role of Director General.

== Aircraft ==
List of aircraft displayed:

- Avro Canada CF-100 Canuck Mk 5 - on loan from the Canadian War Museum starting 2 November 2018, for four years, but may be permanently retained after that. The QAM staff will complete a restoration of the aircraft.
- Duruble Edelweiss RD02A - a functional aircraft that was donated to the museum in 2021 and it is located there since 10 July of the same year.
- Kitty Hawk Flyer - a static display of the museum since 23 July 2021. It was donated by the Kitty Hawk Corporation and it is the only Kitty Hawk Flyer in Canada.
- Mortensen 1PM - a glider built in 1976 by Peder Mortensen and donated to the museum on 30 September 2021. It was relocated there on 26 October 2022 and a it is currently undergoing restoration.

== See also ==
- Organization of Military Museums of Canada
- List of aerospace museums
- Military history of Canada
