= 416 Tactical Fighter Squadron =

Canadian air force squadron

- Active: November 18, 1941–July 6, 2006
- Country: Canada
- Branch: Royal Canadian Air Force
- Type: Aviation squadron
- Motto: Ad Saltum paratus (Ready for the leap)
- Battle honours: Defence of Britain 1942-44; English Channel and North Sea 1943; Fortress Europe 1942-44; Dieppe; France and Germany 1944-45; Normandy 1944; Arnhem; Rhine; Gulf and Kuwait.

Aircraft flown
- Fighter: CF-18 Hornet

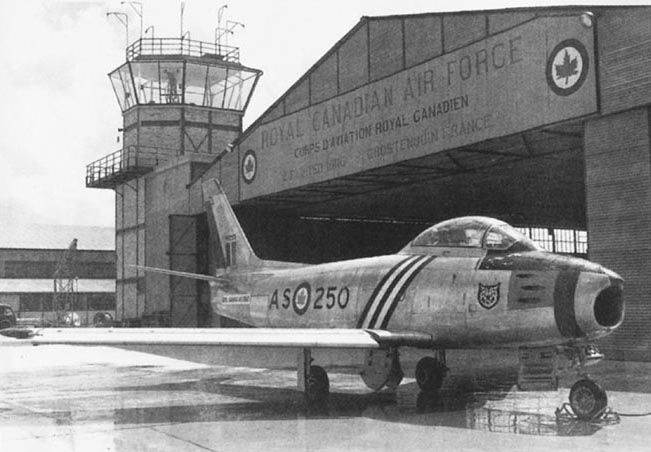
Sabre Mk 5 of No. 416 Squadron at RCAF Station Grostenquin, France, 1953

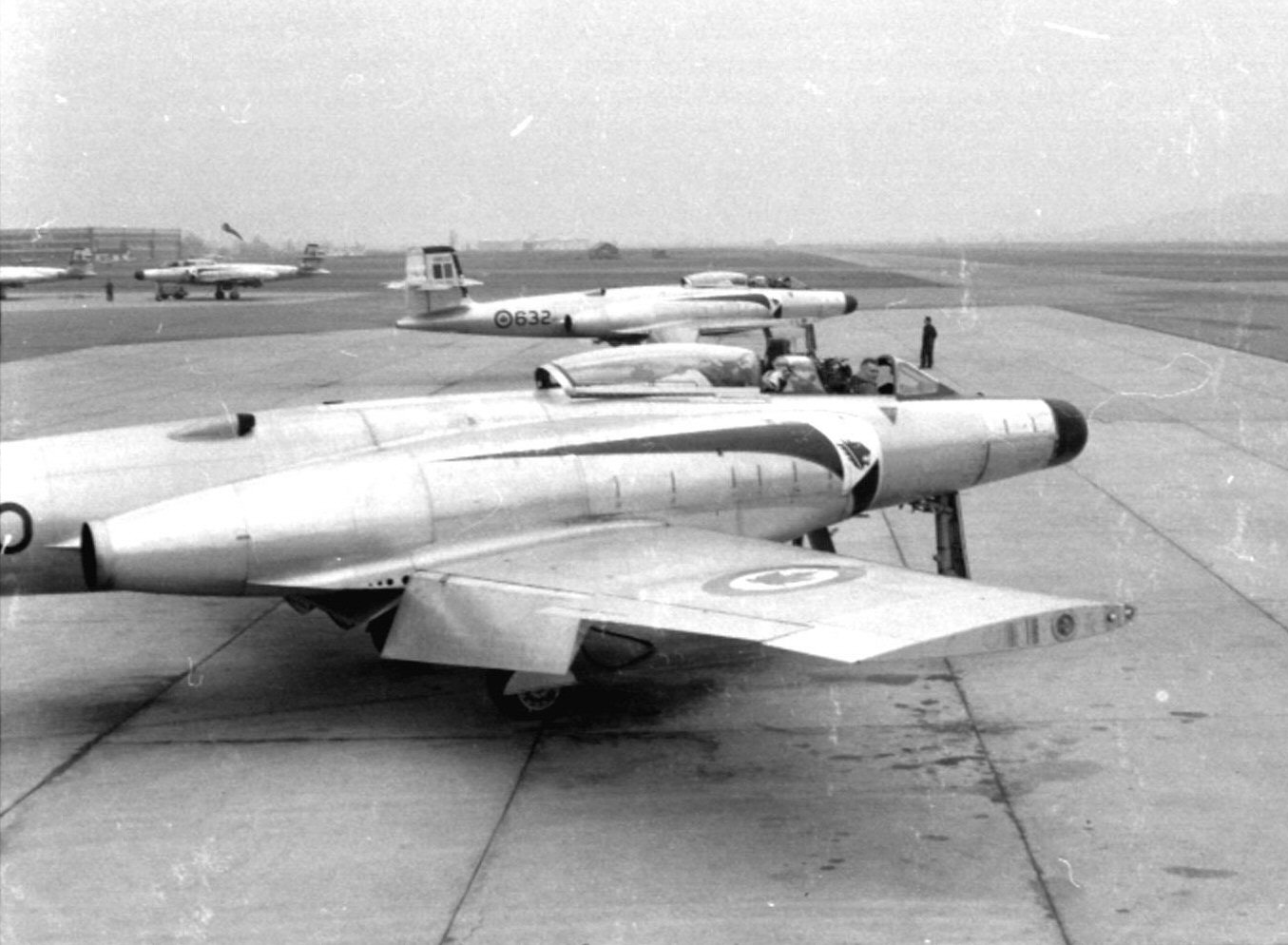
CF-100 Canucks of No. 416 Squadron at RCAF Station St.Hubert. QC, 1960

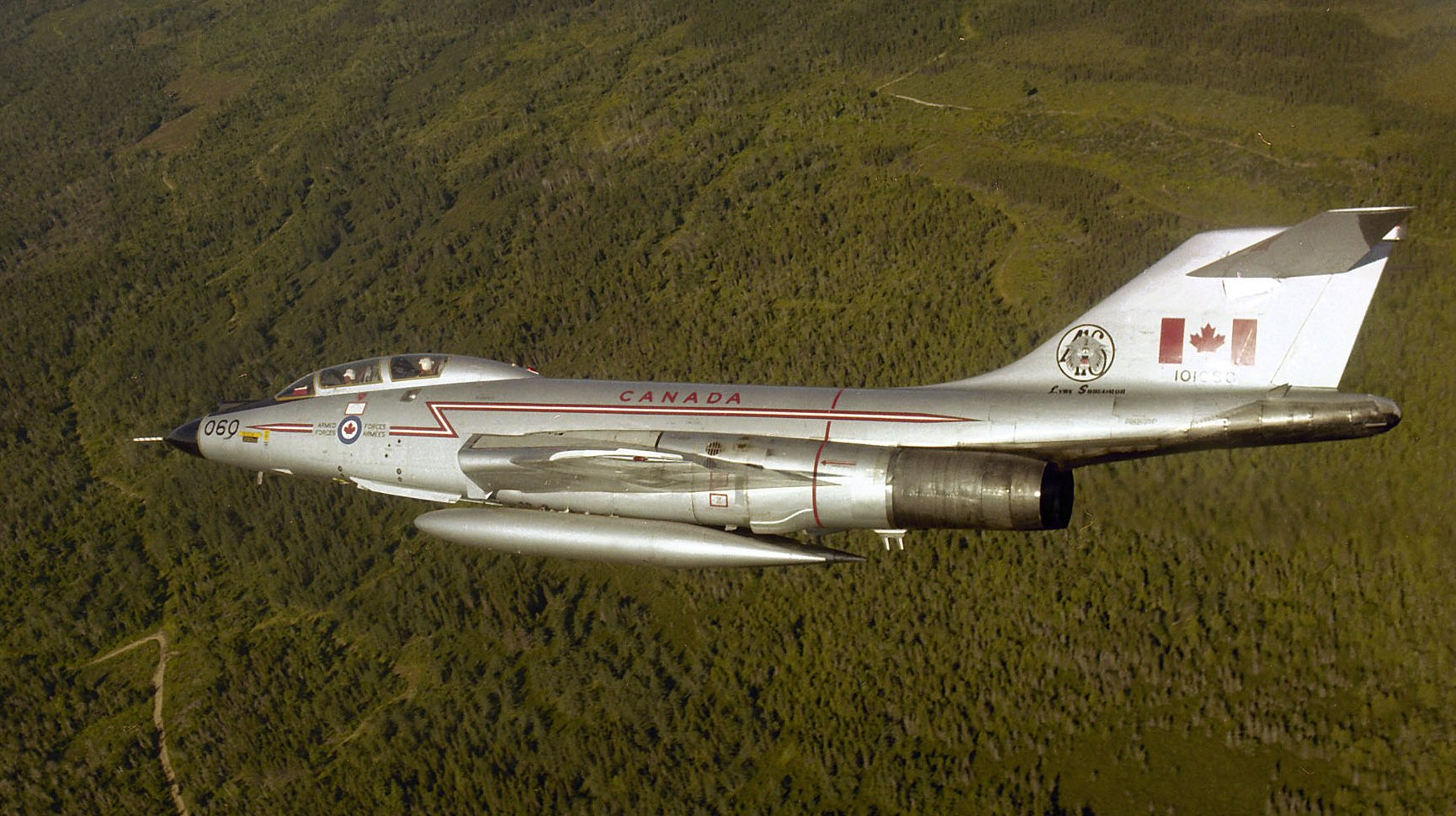
CF101B Voodoo of 416 (AWF) Squadron from CFB Chatham, NB, 1980

416 "City of Oshawa" Tactical Fighter Squadron (416 TFS) was a unit of the Canadian Forces and the Royal Canadian Air Force. The squadron operated the CF-18 Hornet fighter jet from CFB Cold Lake in Alberta, Canada. In 2006, 416 TFS stood down and was amalgamated with 441 Tactical Fighter Squadron to form 409 Tactical Fighter Squadron.

The unit was initially formed as the Royal Canadian Air Force (RCAF) unit during the Second World War.

== History ==
No. 416 Squadron RCAF was formed at RAF Peterhead, Aberdeenshire, Scotland in 1941 as a fighter squadron for service during the Second World War and was based at various RAF stations in Scotland, England and continental Europe. The squadron was disbanded in March 1946. The squadron was reformed in 1952 at RCAF Uplands in Ottawa, Ontario, for European operations as part of Canada's Cold War presence. The squadron was located at Grostenquin, France. By 1957, the squadron was relocated to Canada at RCAF St Hubert near Montreal as an air defence squadron flying Avro Canada CF-100 all-weather fighters. In 1962, the CF-100s were replaced with the CF-101 Voodoo and the squadron was moved to RCAF Chatham, New Brunswick, where they flew the interceptor until the end of 1984. 416 Squadron thus became the world's last front-line unit flying Voodoos.

In 1988, the squadron relocated to CFB Cold Lake as a Tactical Fighter Squadron flying CF-188s. Later, it merged with 441 Tactical Fighter Squadron to reform 409 Tactical Fighter Squadron in 2006.

The squadron's nickname was City of Oshawa, Lynx.

== Battle honours ==
- Defence of Britain 1942-44
- English Channel and North Sea 1943
- Fortress Europe 1942-44
- Dieppe
- France and Germany 1944-45
- Normandy 1944
- Arnhem
- Rhine
- Gulf and Kuwait

== Aircraft ==
- Supermarine Spitfire
- North American P-51 Mustang
- Canadair CT-133 Silver Star
- Canadair Sabre (Mk.2, Mk.5 and Mk.6)
- Avro Canada CF-100 Avro Canada CF-100
- McDonnell Douglas CF-101 Voodoo
- McDonnell Douglas CF-18 Hornet
