= 409 Tactical Fighter Squadron =

Canadian military flying unit

- 409^{e} Escadron d'appui tactique
- Active: 1941–1945, 1954–1991, 1993–1994, 2006–present
- Country: Canada
- Branch: (Canada) Royal Canadian Air Force
- Type: Tactical fighter
- Size: Squadron
- Part of: 4 Wing Cold Lake
- Garrison/HQ: CFB Cold Lake
- Motto: Media nox meridies noster (Latin for 'Midnight is our noon')
- Battle honours: Defence of Britain, 1941–1944; Fortress Europe, 1942–1944; France and Germany, 1944–1945; Normandy, 1944; Rhine; Libya, 2011
- Website: www.canada.ca/en/air-force/corporate/squadrons/409-squadron.html

Aircraft flown
- Fighter: CF-18 Hornet

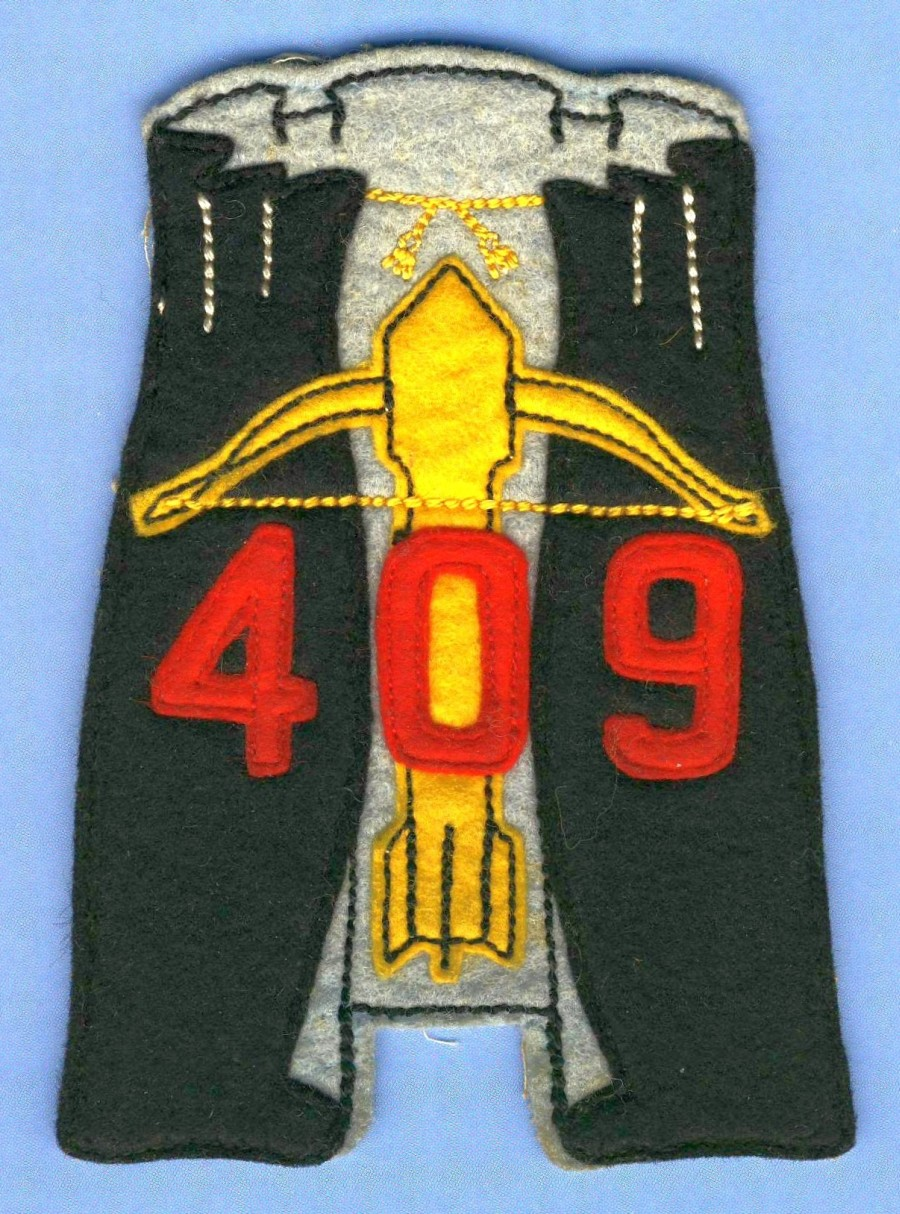
A Cold War 409 Squadron flight suit patch, circa 1955.

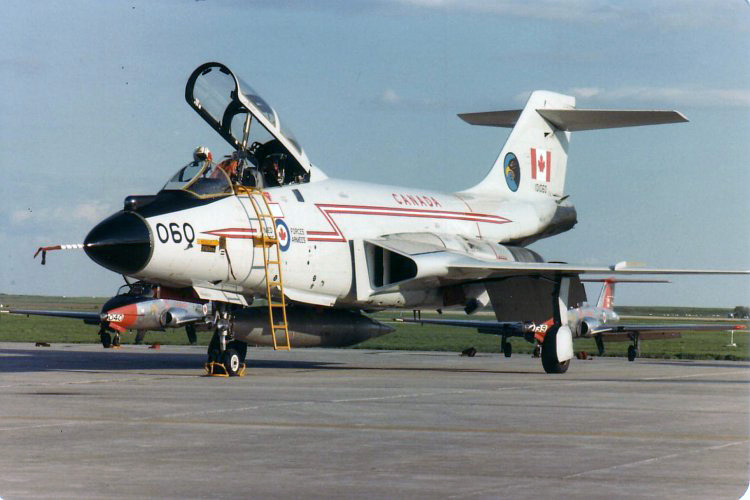
CF-101 Voodoo 101060 from 409 "Nighthawk" Squadron, CFB Comox on the ramp at CFB Moose Jaw in the spring of 1982

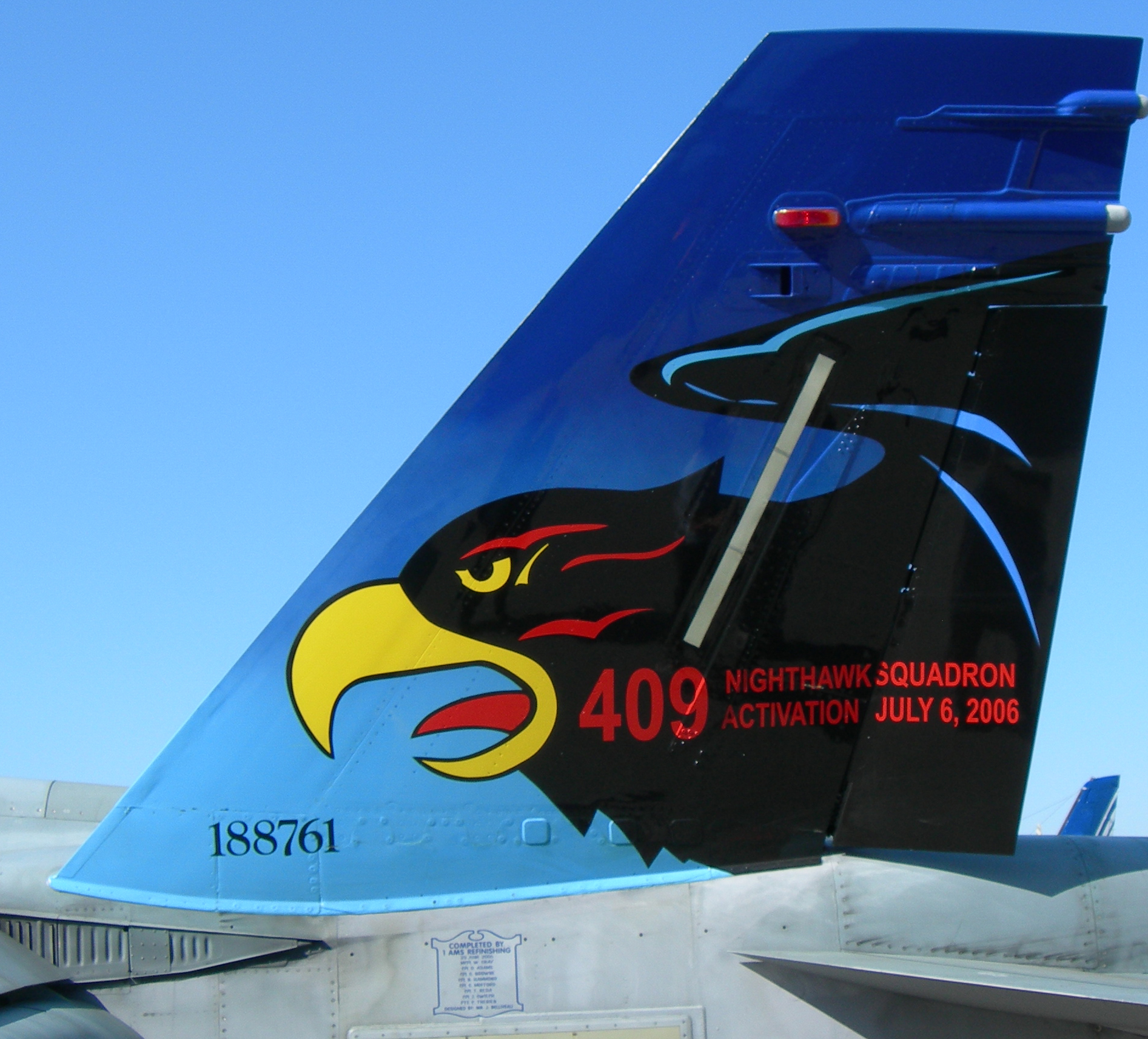
409 Nighthawk Squadron, F-18 bearing tail art of reactivated 409 Squadron

409 Tactical Fighter Squadron (French: 409^{e} Escadron d'appui tactique) is a unit of the Royal Canadian Air Force. The squadron operates the CF-18 Hornet from CFB Cold Lake in Alberta, Canada.

== History ==
The cross-bow in front of the dark cloak represents a weapon used under cover of darkness to denote the squadron's original role as a night fighter squadron. The badge was officially approved in March 1944.

=== Second World War ===
No. 409 Nighthawk Squadron was formed at RAF Digby in June 1941 for night operations with Boulton-Paul Defiants, moving in July to RAF Coleby Grange, where, in August, Beaufighter IIf aircraft arrived, allowing detachments to be maintained elsewhere. Two victories were claimed during the early days of the squadron's existence, but in June 1942 Beaufighter Mark VI aircraft were received, and a greater degree of success was achieved. In February 1943 a move was made to Acklington, with detachments maintained in at least four other locations. In December a return to Coleby Grange was made, with the various detachments continuing their separate existences.

Little was seen during the year, but in March 1944 the squadron moved to Hunsdon, converting to the Mosquito Mk XII and joined No. 85 Group of the Second Tactical Air Force. Intruder and offensive patrols commenced, and much action was seen over the Normandy beachhead in June; 11 victories were claimed during this month. After some action against V-1 Flying Bombs, operations over Europe recommenced, and late in August the unit moved to Carpiquet in France, the first night fighters to be based on the mainland. By mid-October, the squadron had settled in the Lille area, where it was to remain until April 1945. On 19 April, a move was made to the Rhine in Germany, and from here the unit was able to claim six victories in a single night. Shortly after this the war ended with the total victories at 61 1/2 claimed. The squadron's code letters during this period were KP.

=== Cold War ===
Re-established at RCAF Station Comox on 1 November 1954 providing air defence for Canada's west coast as part of NORAD. Initially equipped with the Canadian designed Avro CF-100 they converted to the CF-101 Voodoo in 1962. The squadron transferred to CFB Cold Lake in 1984 to convert to the CF-18 and then deployed to CFB Baden-Soellingen as part of Canada's NATO commitment. The squadron was then disbanded in 1991 with the withdrawal of Canadian Forces from Europe.

== Operations ==
The squadron was briefly reformed back at Comox as a Combat Support Squadron (without aircraft) but was disbanded again. 409 Tactical Fighter Squadron was re-formed from the consolidation of 416 and 441 Tactical Fighter Squadrons on 6 July 2006 at CFB Cold Lake.

Between August and December 2017, the squadron was deployed to the Mihail Kogălniceanu Air Base in Romania as part of Operation Reassurance. The NATO enhanced Air Policing mission in the region is an assurance and deterrence measure taken in 2014 as a response to Russia's annexation of Crimea.

== Battle honours ==
- Defence of Britain 1941–44
- Fortress Europe 1942–44
- Normandy 1944
- France and Germany 1944–45
- Rhine 1945

== Aircraft ==
- Boulton Paul Defiant
- Bristol Beaufighter
- de Havilland Mosquito
- Avro CF-100 Canuck
- Canadair (Lockheed) CT-33 Silver Star
- McDonnell Douglas CF-101 Voodoo
- McDonnell Douglas CF-18 Hornet
