= 414 Electronic Warfare Support Squadron =

- 414^{e} Escadron de soutien de guerre électronique (French)
- Active: 13 August 1941 – 7 August 1945; 1 April 1947 – 1 November 1950; 1 November 1952 – 14 July 1957; 5 August 1957 – 30 June 1964; 15 September 1967 – 2002; 20 January 2009 –present
- Country: Canada
- Branch: Royal Canadian Air Force
- Part of: Royal Canadian Air Force Aerospace Warfare Centre
- Garrison/HQ: Ottawa
- Motto: Totis viribus (Latin for 'with all our might')
- Battle honours: Defence of Britain, 1942–43; Fortress Europe, 1942–44; Dieppe; France and Germany, 1944–45; Normandy, 1944; Arnhem; Rhine; Biscay, 1943
- Website: canada.ca/en/air-force/corporate/squadrons/414-squadron.html

Insignia
- Squadron code in WWII: RU

Aircraft flown
- Electronic warfare: Dassault Falcon CC-117; McDonnell EF-101B "Electric Voodoo"
- Fighter: Curtiss Tomahawk; Supermarine Spitfire; North American Mustang; Canadair Sabre Mk.4; Avro Canada CF-100 Canuck
- Interceptor: McDonnell CF-101 Voodoo
- Reconnaissance: Westland Lysander
- Trainer: Canadair CT-133 Silver Star; Dassault/Dornier Alpha Jet (contracted)
- Transport: Douglas Dakota

414 Electronic Warfare Support Squadron is a unit of the Royal Canadian Air Force. It is in Ottawa and conducts electronic warfare support training for other units in the Canadian Armed Forces.

== History ==
=== World War II ===
On 13 August 1941, No 414 Army Co-operation Squadron was formed at RAF Croydon, England, flying Westland Lysander and Curtiss Tomahawk aircraft. On 28 June 1943 the squadron's name was changed to 414 Fighter Reconnaissance Squadron to reflect its role, and later known as 414 “City of Sarnia” Squadron (Sarnia Imperials). Throughout the Second World War the squadron was based at numerous airfields in England and in continentental Europe flying Supermarine Spitfire and North American Mustang aircraft. During this period, the squadron provided photo reconnaissance, intelligence and ground attacks for both the Dieppe Raid and the allied Invasion of Europe. It accounted for 29 enemy aircraft destroyed and 11 damaged, 76 locomotives and 12 naval vessels destroyed. After the war ended, the squadron disbanded at Lüneburg Airfield (Advanced Landing Ground B156), Germany on 7 August 1945.

=== Postwar ===
On 1 April 1947, No 414 Photographic Squadron was reformed at RCAF Station Rockcliffe. The squadron used the Douglas Dakota to photograph 323,754 square miles (838,520 km^{2}) of Canada's North. When this task was completed it was disbanded on 1 November 1950.

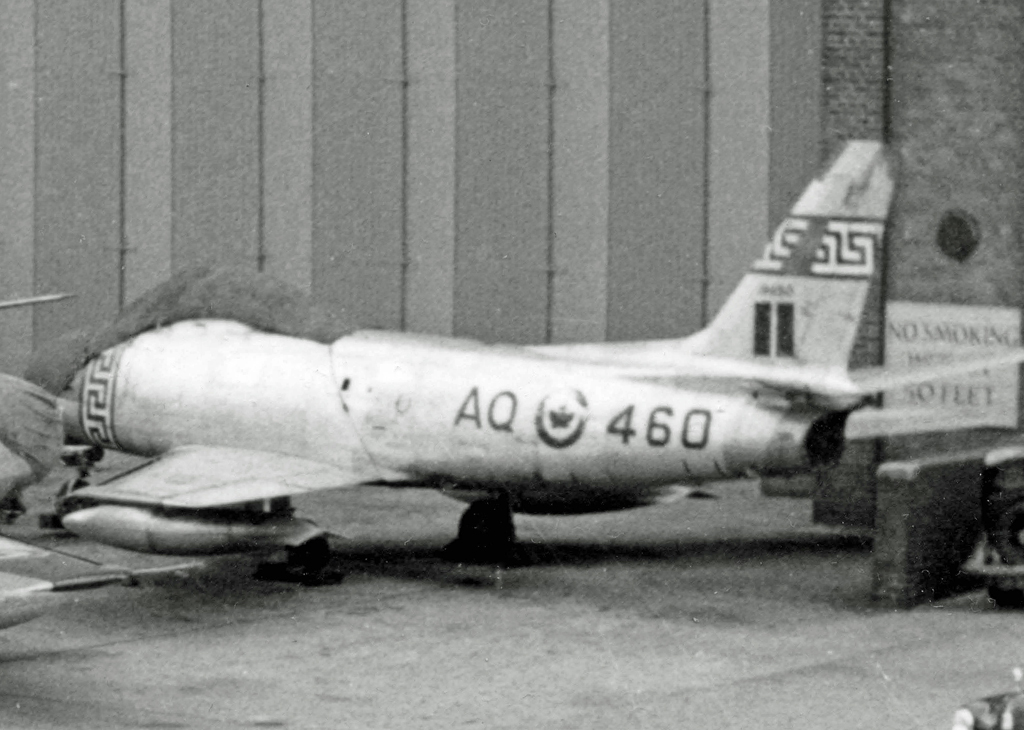
414 Squadron Canadair Sabre 4 in 1954

On 1 November 1952 No 414 Fighter Squadron reformed at RCAF Station Bagotville. The following summer on 24 August 1953 as part of "Leap Frog IV" the squadron moved to 4 Wing Baden-Soellingen flying the Canadair Mark.4 Sabre. Four years later on 14 July 1957 the squadron disbanded to make room for the arrival of 419 Squadron flying the Avro Canada CF-100.

On 5 August 1957, the squadron reformed at RCAF Station North Bay where it operated as an all-weather fighter squadron flying the CF-100 Canuck and the McDonnell CF-101 Voodoo until 30 June 1964 when it was disbanded once more.

The squadron then reformed on 15 September 1967 at RCAF Station St Hubert in its new role as an electronic warfare squadron flying the CF-100. In August 1972 the squadron moved to CFB North Bay where it remained for the next twenty years flying the CF-100, Dassault CC-117 Falcon and McDonnell EF-101B "Electric Voodoo". In 1992 the squadron was split into two parts with one part going to CFB Comox as No 414 Composite Squadron and the other part going to CFB Greenwood as 434 Composite Squadron. In 1993 the squadron changed its name to No 414 Combat Support Squadron when it was equipped with the Canadair CT-133 Silver Star. The squadron was disbanded in 2002 when its duties were contracted out to a civilian company.

On 7 December 2007 approval was received for the squadron to stand up once more, this time as 414 EWS (Electronic Warfare Support) Squadron. Belonging to the RCAF Aerospace Warfare Centre, the squadron is based in Ottawa and is composed of military Electronic Warfare Officers who fulfill the combat support role, flying on civilian contracted aircraft.

The squadron was re-formed at Gatineau Airport, Quebec, on 20 January 2009 to operate the Dassault/Dornier Alpha Jet provided by Top Aces Canada.

== Badges ==
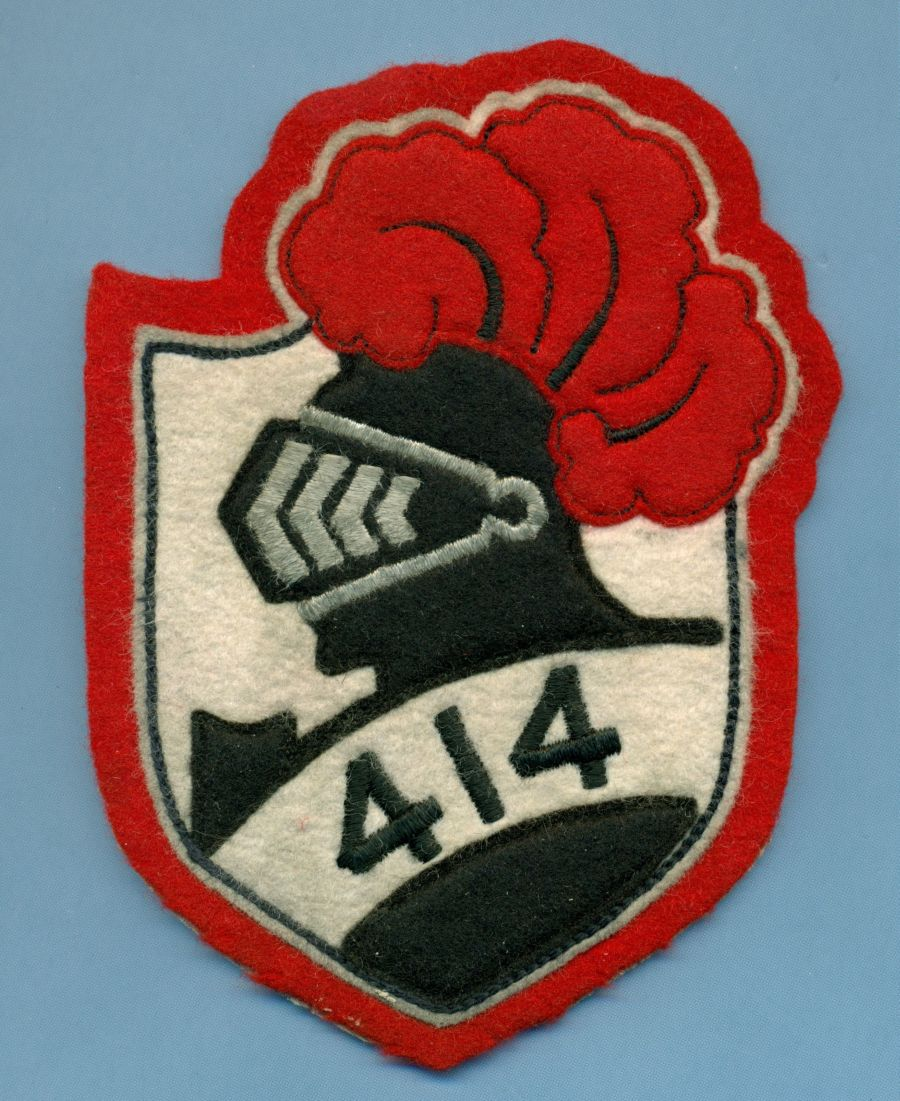
RCAF 414 Sqn in felt, 1957–67

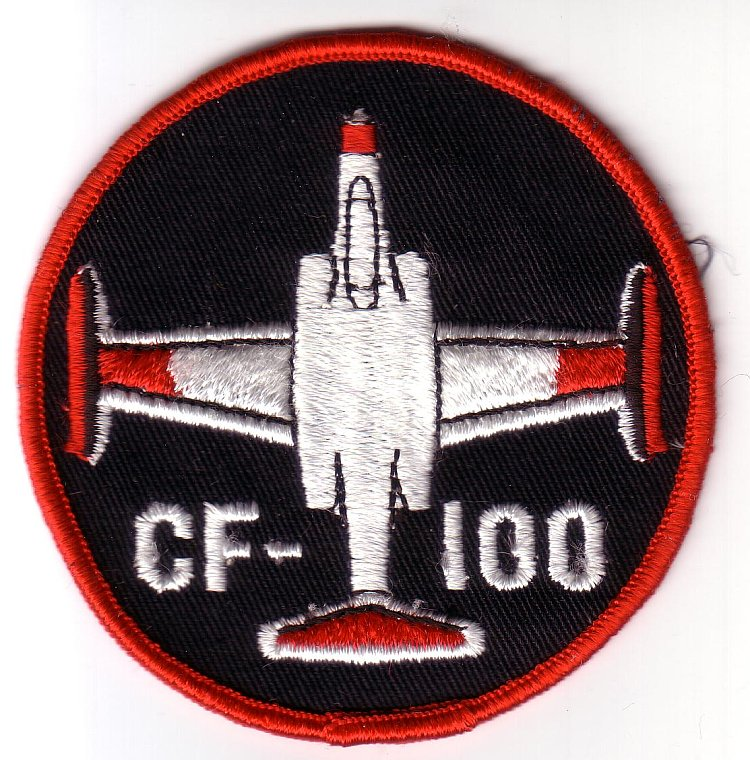
CF-100 badge worn by 414 Squadron crews in the 1970s and 80s
