= 441 Tactical Fighter Squadron =

441 Tactical Fighter Squadron No. 441 (Silver Fox) Squadron RCAF
- Active: 1942-1945; 1951-2006
- Country: Canada
- Branch: (Canada) Royal Canadian Air Force
- Role: Fighter aircraft
- Part of: 4 Wing (1986–2006)
- Home base: CFB Cold Lake (1986–2006)
- Nickname: Silver Fox
- Mottos: Stalk and Kill
- Battle honours: Defence of Britain 1945; Fortress Europe 1944; Normandy; France and Germany 1944-45; Arnhem; Walcheren; Kosovo

Insignia
- Squadron Badge: The head of a silver fox affronte

Aircraft flown
- Fighter: Supermarine Spitfire; North American P-51 Mustang de Havilland Vampire; Canadair Sabre; Canadair CF-104 Starfighter; McDonnell Douglas CF-18 Hornet

441 Tactical Fighter Squadron was a unit of the Canadian Forces. It was originally formed as a unit of the Royal Canadian Air Force (RCAF) during the Second World War. The squadron operated the McDonnell Douglas CF-18 Hornet fighter jet from CFB Cold Lake in Alberta, Canada. It was deactivated in 2006.

== History ==
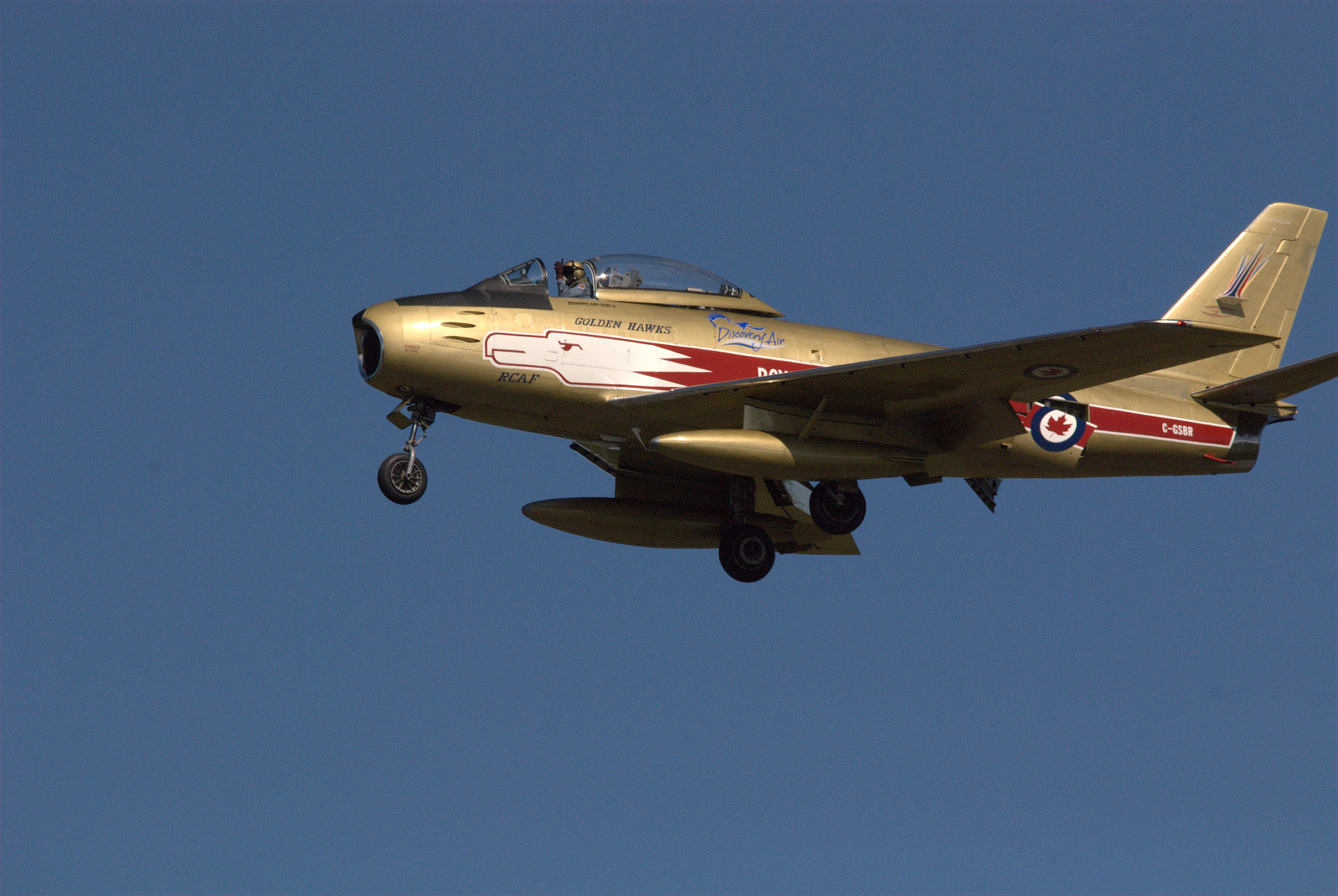
A Canadair Sabre (#23314) formerly of 441 Squadron now refurbished in the colours of the Golden Hawks

No. 125 (Fighter) Squadron was formed on 20 April 1942 at Sydney, Nova Scotia and flew Hurricanes as part of RCAF Eastern Air Command. It was renumbered No. 441 Fighter Squadron when it transferred overseas to RAF Station Digby, Lincolnshire, England, on 8 February 1944, under the command of Squadron Leader George Hill. It was posted to airfields in England, France, and Belgium throughout the Second World War, flying the Supermarine Spitfire. When the squadron returned to England it was disbanded on 7 August 1945.

No 441 Squadron reformed at RCAF Station St. Hubert on 1 March 1951 and went to No 1 Wing, then located at RAF North Luffenham, in Rutland, England on 13 February 1952. The squadron was temporarily situated at 3 Wing Zweibrücken on 21 December 1954, before moving to their intended destination, RCAF Station Marville, France. They were deactivated (disbanded) on 1 September 1963 at Marville and then reactivated (reformed) as No 441 Strike/Attack squadron on 15 September 1963, then moved with 1 Wing to Canadian Forces Base Lahr in April 1967. In 1971 the squadron moved to CFB Baden-Soellingen and changed its name to 441 Tactical Fighter Squadron. They disbanded again in 1986 and then finally reformed at 4 Wing Cold Lake on 26 June 1986.

On 6 July 2006, No 441 Squadron was once again stood down (disbanded), and its crew amalgamating with 416 Tactical Fighter Squadron at CFB Cold Lake and re-formed as 409 Tactical Fighter Squadron. The squadron's colours and battle honours were placed in Sydney, Nova Scotia, where it first operated.
