= CFB Chatham =

Former Canadian Forces Base in New Brunswick

- Near Chatham, New Brunswick in Canada
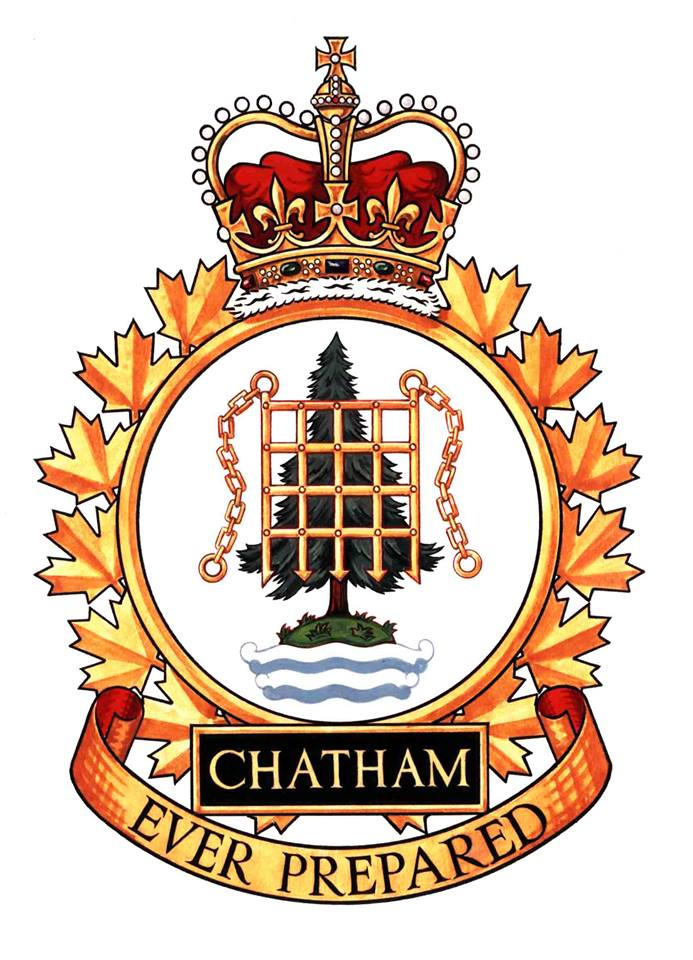
- CFB Chatham crest

Site information
- Owner: Dept of National Defence (Canada)

Location
- Location within New Brunswick
- Coordinates: 47°0′49.32″N 65°26′49.56″W

Airfield information
- Elevation: 90 ft (27 m) AMSL
Runways
Direction	Length and surface
11/29	5,000 ft (1,500 m) Hard Surface
16/34	5,000 ft (1,500 m) Hard Surface
5/23	5,000 ft (1,500 m) Hard Surface

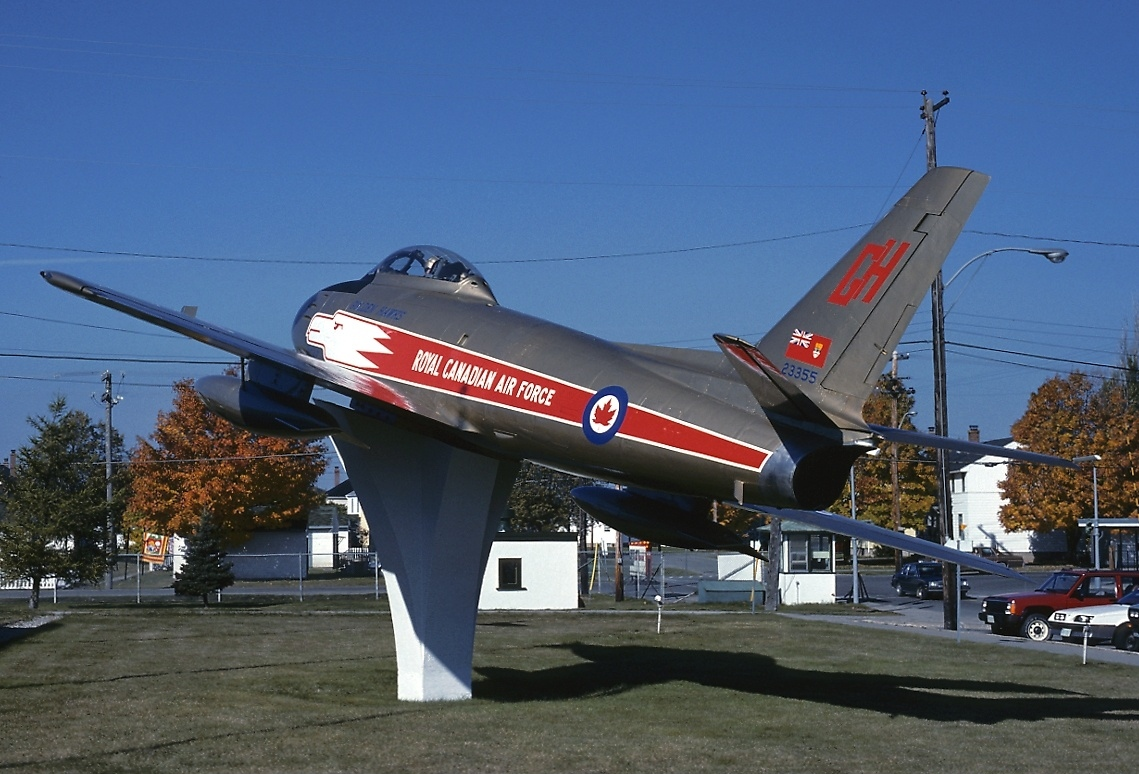
A display at the gate painted in the colors of the famed Golden Hawks was eventually removed from its pedestal following the closure of CFB Chatham in 1996

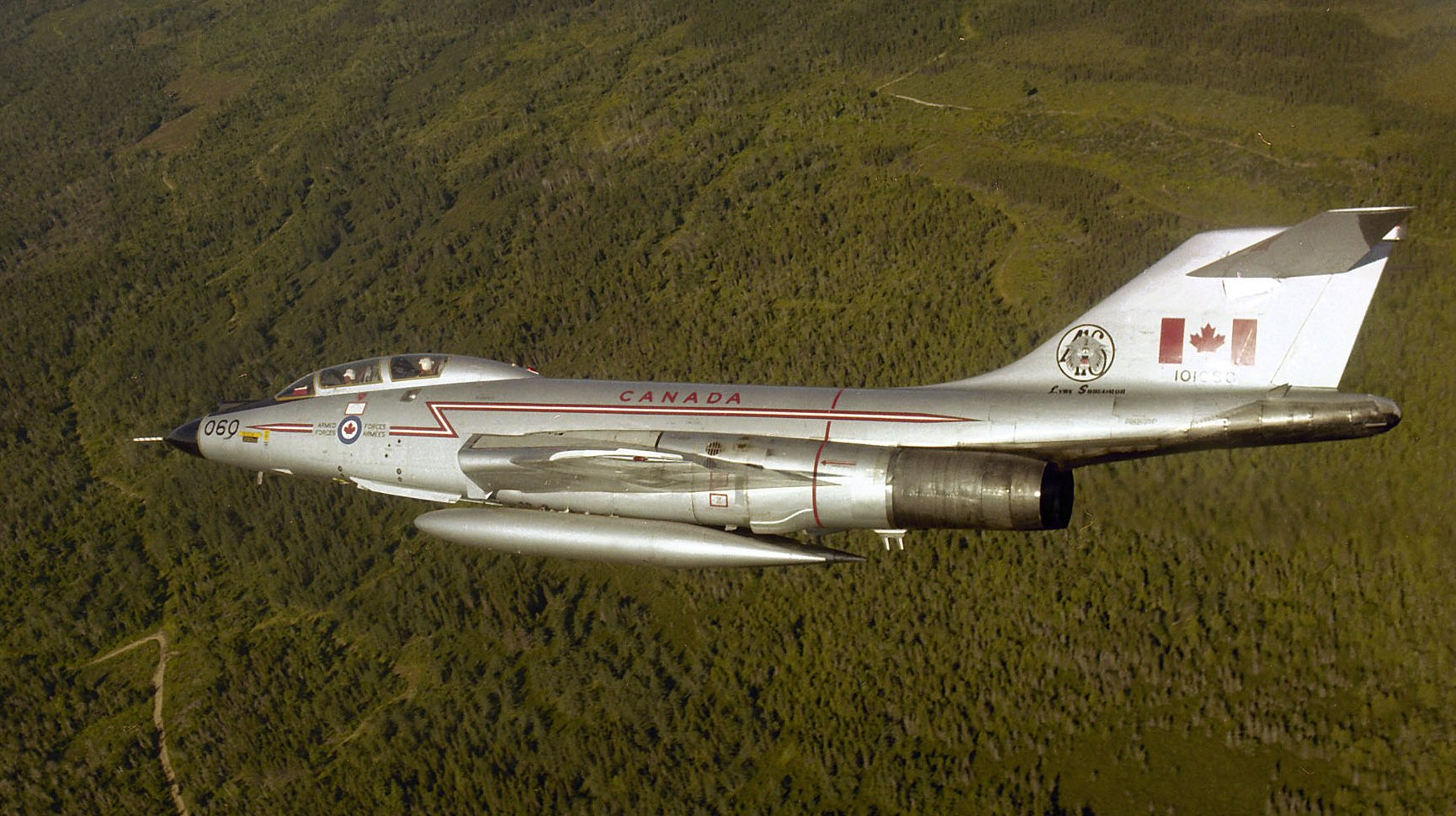
CF101B Voodoo of 416 (AWF) Squadron from CFB Chatham, NB, 1980

Canadian Forces Base Chatham or CFB Chatham was a Canadian Forces Base located immediately south of the town of Chatham, New Brunswick, Canada. Parts are now operating as Miramichi Municipal Airport since 1974 with a partial runway available (09/27 - asphalt).

== History ==
=== Second World War ===
Air training facilities were established across Canada during the Second World War as part of the British Commonwealth Air Training Plan and local MLA William Stafford Anderson applied for two schools in the Miramichi Valley region. The site was on level, cleared land with ready rail and road access. The Canadian government initially balked at paying for more expensive farmland, but the Government of New Brunswick agreed to front a portion of the cost. Construction began in the summer of 1940 and the airfield was ready by the following spring.

No. 21 Elementary Flying Training School (EFTS) began operations on 3 July 1941 using 31 Fleet Finch loaned from the RCAF, while No. 10 Air Observer School (AOS), flying the Avro Anson, opened the following month. 21 EFTS was disbanded in August 1942 and re-established in Neepawa, Manitoba as No. 35 EFTS. 10 AOS remained at Chatham until it was disbanded in April 1945.

On 7 May 1943, a flight of 14 Ansons took off from Chatham. Heavy fog rolled into the area soon afterward, obscuring the airfield. Two aircraft ditched in the Gulf of St. Lawrence and a third crashed in a field near Elgin, New Brunswick. Four trainee aircrew and one instructor were killed.

Detachments of No. 113 Squadron and No. 119 Squadron patrolled the Gulf of St. Lawrence from Chatham in 1942 and 1943 flying Lockheed Hudsons. U-Boats were active in the Gulf and both U-165 and U-517 were attacked by Chatham-based aircraft, although neither were sunk.

=== Cold War ===
The facility lay dormant at war's end, but after three years of inactivity, it reopened as part of the defence buildup associated with the Cold War. Royal Canadian Air Force Station Chatham was established on 1 May 1949 as part of 1 Air Defence Group. By October of that year, Chatham was home to 421 Squadron, 1 Fighter Operational Training Unit (1 OTU) and 2 Aircraft Warning & Control Unit (2 ACWU). 421 and the OTU operated the de Havilland Vampire fighter. 421 Squadron moved to the UK in 1950, but the OTU's operations expanded significantly. By the end of 1952, the base was home to 38 Canadair Sabres, 15 Canadair CT-133 Silver Stars, 4 Mustangs, 2 Beechcraft Expeditors and 7 Harvards, as well as a total of 980 personnel, consisting of 164 officers 74 senior NCOs, 590 airmen and 152 civilians. By 1954, the OTU was graduating courses of 50 pilots every 12 weeks, including many from other countries.

2 ACWU was disbanded in 1952 upon the formation of 21 Air Control & Warning Squadron, later redesignated 21 Radar Squadron. This unit moved to the newly established RCAF Station St. Margarets, a nearby radar station, in 1953.

In 1961, 1 Operational Training Unit was disbanded and the Saber Transition Unit was formed (STU). The STU was intended as transition training between the CT-133s flown in advanced pilot training and CF-104 Starfighter training at Cold Lake. STU operations were gradually wound down and disbanded in 1968 as the RCAF's fighter squadrons in Europe built up their strength and the Sabre was retired from service. Over 400 Canadian and 67 Norwegian pilots were trained.

In the early 1960s, Chatham also became a fighter interceptor base. 416 Squadron, flying the McDonnell CF-101 Voodoo, arrived in November 1962, becoming the first operational unit at the base since 421 Squadron's departure. An American USAF detachment associated with the use of the nuclear-tipped AIR-2 Genie missile was located in Chatham from 1964 to 1975. The Voodoos were on constant standby, with two on 5-minute alert at all times. With the arrival of the CF-18 Hornet, Canada's interceptor force was consolidated at CFB Bagotville and CFB Cold Lake. 416 Squadron flew the last operational voodoos in Canadian service and the last alert crews were stood down on 31 December 1984 before the squadron moved to Cold Lake.

With the unification of Canada's armed services and the creation of the Canadian Armed Forces in 1968, RCAF Chatham was redesignated Canadian Forces Base Chatham. RCAF Station St. Margarets became a detachment of the base, as did the nearby Royal Canadian Navy ammunition depot at Renous and Tracadie Range.

=== Golden Hawks ===
The Golden Hawks aerobatic team was formed in 1959, and operated from Chatham for the 1960, 1961 and 1962 seasons. The team moved to RCAF Station Trenton in 1963 and was disbanded the following year.

=== Search & Rescue ===
In the early 1950s, a Sikorsky S-51 was based seasonally at Chatham for search and rescue purposes. This became a year round assignment in 1954. They were later joined by the CH-125 Workhorse. Both of these were replaced by the CH-127, a newer model of the CH-125. From 1970 until 1985 Chatham had a Base Rescue Flight operating three CH-118 Iroquois helicopters. When the Voodoo interceptors were retired, the CH-118s were redeployed to Base Flight Cold Lake.

== Aerodrome Information ==
In approximately 1942 the aerodrome was listed at 47°01′N 65°27′W with a Var. 24 degrees 30' W and elevation of 90 feet (27 m). Three runways were listed as follows:

Runway Name	Length	Width	Surface
11/29	5,000 ft (1,500 m)	150 ft (46 m)	Hard surfaced
16/34	5,000 ft (1,500 m)	150 ft (46 m)	Hard surfaced
5/23	5,000 ft (1,500 m)	150 ft (46 m)	Hard surfaced

== Squadrons ==
- 1942 No. 113 (Bomber-Reconnaissance) Squadron - Lockheed Hudson
- 1943 No. 119 (Bomber-Reconnaissance) Squadron - Lockheed Hudson
- 1941-1942 No. 21 Elementary Flying Training School
- 1941-1945 No. 10 Air Observer School
- 1949-1951 No. 421 Squadron RCAF
- 1949-1961 No. 1 Operational Training Unit
- 1959-1963 Golden Hawks - Canadair Sabres
- 1961-1968 Sabre Transition Unit
- 1962-1984 No. 416 Squadron RCAF - McDonnell CF-101 Voodoo and Base Rescue Flight - CH-118 Iroquois
- 1984-1989 No. 434 Squadron RCAF - Canadair CF-5 and Base Rescue Flight - CH-118 Iroquois
