= McDonnell CF-101 Voodoo =

Jet fighter aircraft

CF-101 Voodoo
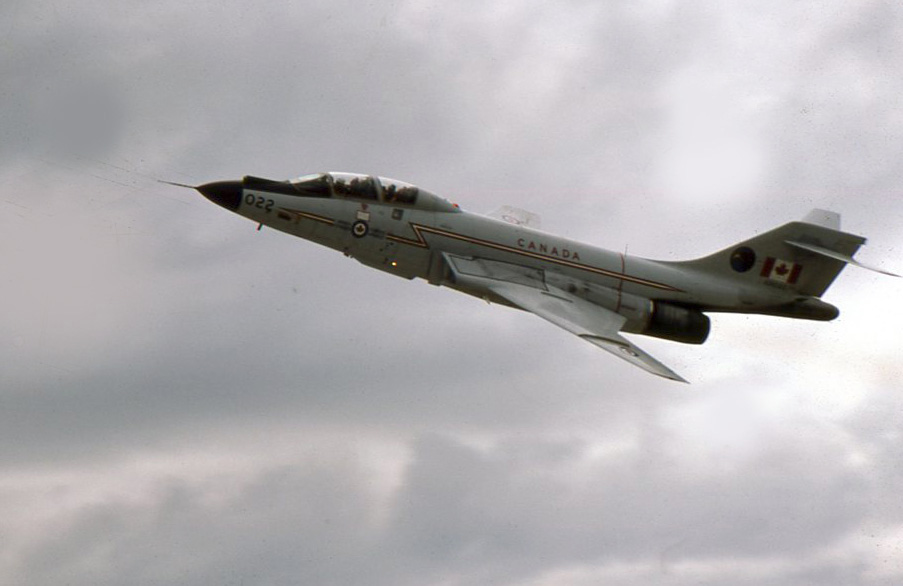
- McDonnell CF-101 Voodoo

General information
- Type: Interceptor aircraft
- National origin: United States
- Manufacturer: McDonnell
- Status: Retired from service, All have either been scrapped or have been put preserved in museums
- Primary users: Royal Canadian Air Force Canadian Forces
- Number built: 132 (two batches of 66)

History
- Introduction date: 1961
- First flight: 29 September 1954 (F-101)
- Retired: 1987
- Developed from: McDonnell F-101 Voodoo

The McDonnell CF-101 Voodoo is an all-weather interceptor aircraft operated by the Royal Canadian Air Force and the Canadian Forces between 1961 and 1984. They were manufactured by the McDonnell Aircraft Corporation of St. Louis, Missouri for the United States Air Force (as F-101s), and later sold to Canada. CF-101s replaced the obsolete Avro CF-100 Canuck in the RCAF's all-weather fighter squadrons. The Voodoo's primary armament was nuclear AIR-2A Genie unguided air-to-air rockets, and there was significant political controversy in Canada about their adoption. Although they never fired a weapon in wartime, the CF-101 served as Canada's primary means of air defence from Quick Reaction Alert facilities at Canadian airbases. The CF-101s were retired in the 1980s and replaced with McDonnell Douglas CF-18 Hornet fighters. Many examples are preserved in museums and parks in Canada and the United States.

== Acquisition ==
=== Origins ===
After the cancellation of the CF-105 Arrow program in February 1959, George Pearkes, the Canadian Minister of National Defence, officially maintained that the existing Avro CF-100 interceptors and the Bomarc missiles that had been ordered in September 1958 would be adequate for Canada's air defence needs. Unofficially, it was recognized that there was still a bomber threat, and talks had been underway prior to the Avro Arrow's termination on the RCAF acquisition of an "off-the-shelf" interceptor from the United States.

The USAF indicated its readiness to supply 56 F-101B interceptors and 10 F-101F trainers (by employing Convair F-102 Delta Daggers in less demanding NORAD sectors) for Canada. The deal was delayed by over a year by negotiations over offsets and acquisition costs, as well as debate within the Diefenbaker government about Canada adopting nuclear weapons systems, which had been agreed to in principle in 1958. The financial arrangements were settled by Canada taking on the staffing and funding of 11 Pinetree Line radar stations within Canada that had formerly been operated and funded by the USAF. An agreement signed in June 1961 covered the transfer of the aircraft, meant to equip five front-line squadrons (replacing nine CF-100 squadrons) and an Operational Training Unit (OTU).

=== Nuclear weapons controversy ===
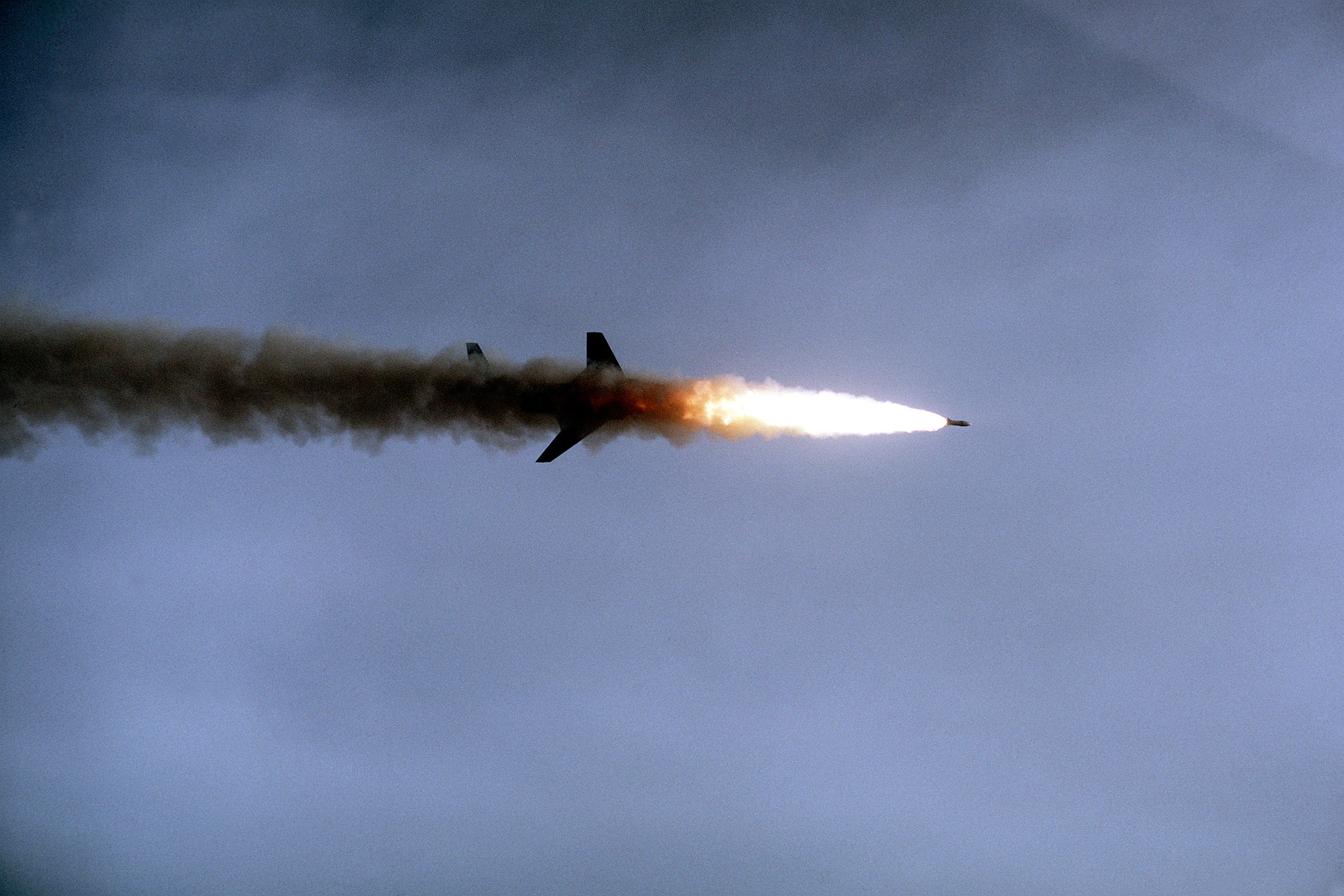
CF-101B firing AIR-2 Genie in 1982

The issue of nuclear weapons in Canada had not been resolved in June 1961, thus the CF-101s were armed only with their secondary AIM-4D Falcon missiles. In April 1963, the issue led to the collapse of the Diefenbaker government. The succeeding Pearson government signed an agreement with the United States concerning nuclear arms for Canada on 16 August 1963. The agreement did not actually state that Canada was acquiring nuclear weapons; the Canadian government usually refused to confirm or deny that there were any nuclear arms in Canada. The agreement specifically stated that the AIR-2A Genie rockets were the property of the United States and would only be released to Canada for actual use with the joint agreement of Canada and the United States through NORAD. The stringent training requirements meant that it took until June 1965 for the Genies to become operational in Canada. The Genies were kept in the custody of the USAF, with detachments of the 425th Munitions Support Squadron located at each of the Canadian bases.

== Operational history ==
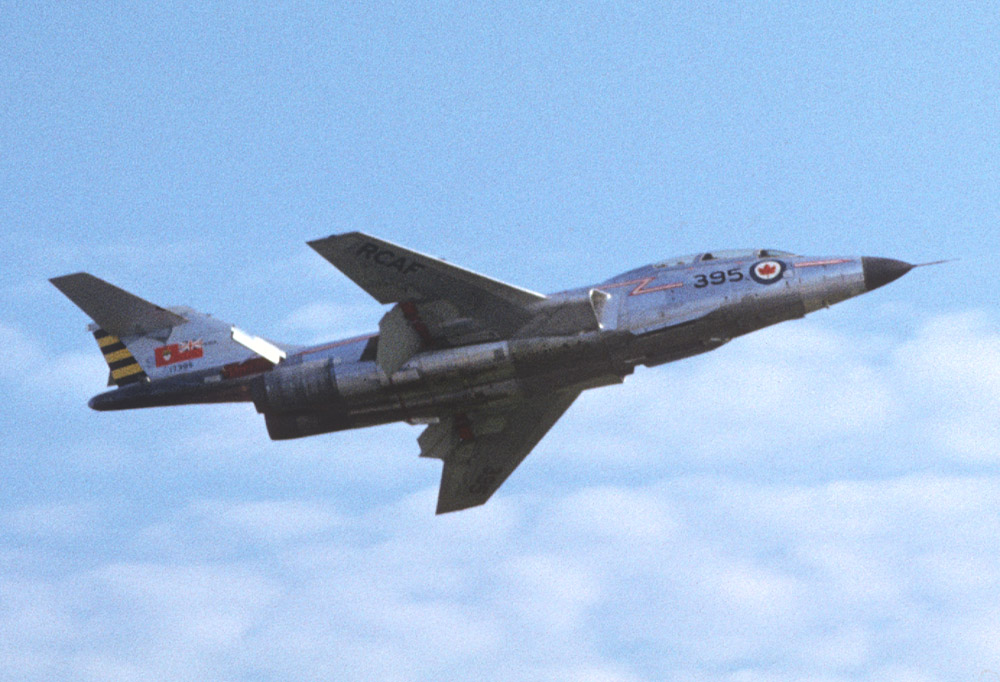
CF-101B Voodoo 17395 at the Bagotville Air Pageant, summer 1962. Notice the old-style Canadian flag.

On 24 July 1961, the first two Voodoos were transferred to Canada in a ceremony at RCAF Uplands in Ottawa, marking the beginning of Operation Queen's Row. 425 Squadron officially began operations at RCAF Namao, Alberta, on 15 October 1961, initially acting as the conversion training squadron for 410, 416, 409, and 414 Squadrons. No. 425 then became an operational unit itself, turning the conversion role over to No. 3 All Weather OTU at RCAF Bagotville, Quebec. By the end of 1962, the squadrons were operating out of RCAF Comox, British Columbia, (409 Squadron), RCAF North Bay, Ontario, (414 Squadron), RCAF Uplands, Ottawa, Ontario, (410 Squadron), RCAF Bagotville, Quebec, (425 Squadron), and RCAF Chatham, New Brunswick, (416 Squadron). Defence cuts in 1964 eliminated Nos. 410 and 414 Squadrons (although a reformed 414 Squadron would operate the Voodoo years later).

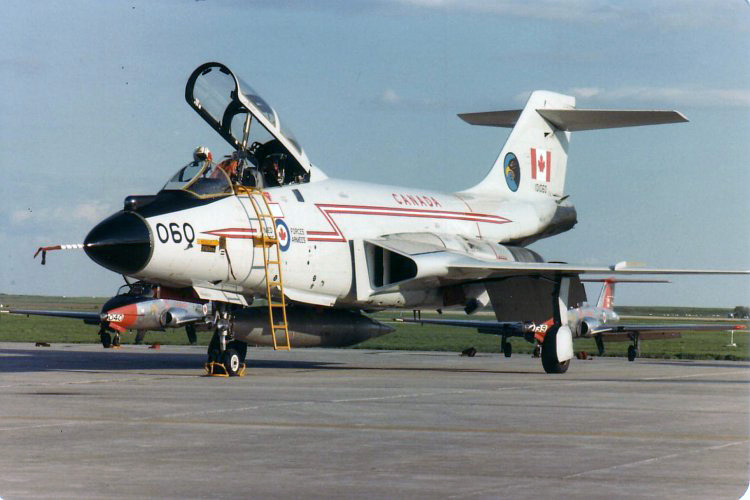
CF-101 Voodoo 101060 from 409 "Nighthawk" Squadron, CFB Comox on the ramp at CFB Moose Jaw in 1982

Each Voodoo base was laid out to allow aircraft to be kept at immediate readiness at all times. A Quick Reaction Alert (QRA) facility was positioned at the end of the main runway to allow alert aircraft to launch as quickly as possible. Two aircraft and their crews were always on "five minute" alert — they were to be in the air, en route to intercept unknown aircraft, within five minutes of receiving the order. In one instance, 416 Squadron got two alert aircraft in the air only 57 seconds after receiving the alert. Voodoos were regularly dispatched to intercept unidentified NORAD radar contacts, usually off course airliners, although 416 and 425 occasionally intercepted Soviet Tu-95 Bear bombers flying along the Atlantic coast to Cuba. Fortunately, no situation arose in which a CF-101 pilot fired his weapons in anger.

Between 1970 and 1972, Canada traded the 56 survivors of the original CF-101 fleet back to the USAF for 66 replacements under Operation Peace Wings. These replacement aircraft were actually manufactured earlier than the original fleet, but the "new" airframes had a lower number of hours and had received updates that the original Canadian Voodoos had not (such as an IR tracking system). Bristol Aerospace of Winnipeg, Manitoba performed modifications on the incoming fleet such as transferring some specifically Canadian equipment, including engines, from the old aircraft to the new. Most of the old Canadian Voodoos were scrapped in the US, but 22 were converted to RF-101B photo-reconnaissance versions and flew with the Nevada Air National Guard until 1975.

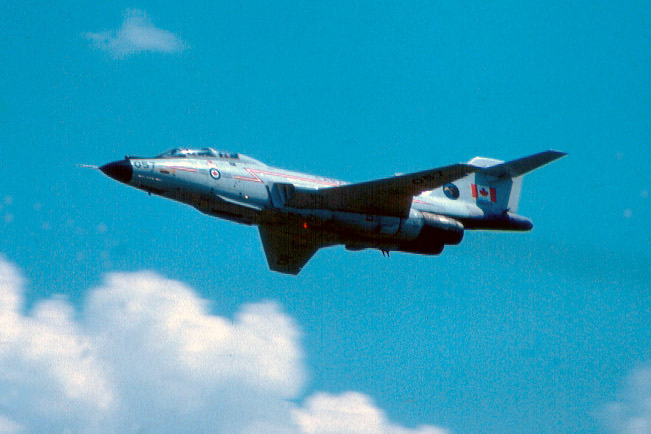
CF-101B (101057) from 409 Squadron in an airshow flypast on 13 June 1982 at CFB Edmonton

During its service, the CF-101 was a popular performer at airshows and other events in Canada and the United States. In 1967, a CF-101 flew (in company with a CF-104 and The Red Knight T-33) in the Golden Centennaires display team to mark the nation's Centennial. In 1984, each squadron painted a special "show" aircraft to commemorate the type's impending retirement.

=== Obsolescence and retirement ===
Through the 1970s, the increasing obsolescence of the CF-101 and the CF-104 led to the New Fighter Aircraft program. Launched in 1977, the program sought a replacement for the CF-5, CF-104 Starfighter, and CF-101 Voodoo. The Grumman F-14 Tomcat, F-15 Eagle, F-16 Falcon, McDonnell Douglas F/A-18 Hornet, Panavia Tornado, Dassault Mirage F1, and the Mirage 2000 were evaluated as potential replacements. Cost considerations reduced the choice to the F-16 and F-18; the F-18 was ultimately selected in April 1980. The Voodoo OTU converted to CF-18 Hornets in June 1982; 409 and 425 Squadrons also stood down in June 1984. In 1985, 416 Squadron moved from CFB Chatham, New Brunswick to CFB Cold Lake, Alberta and converted from the Voodoo to the Hornet. With the stand down, the last nuclear weapons in Canada were returned to the US.

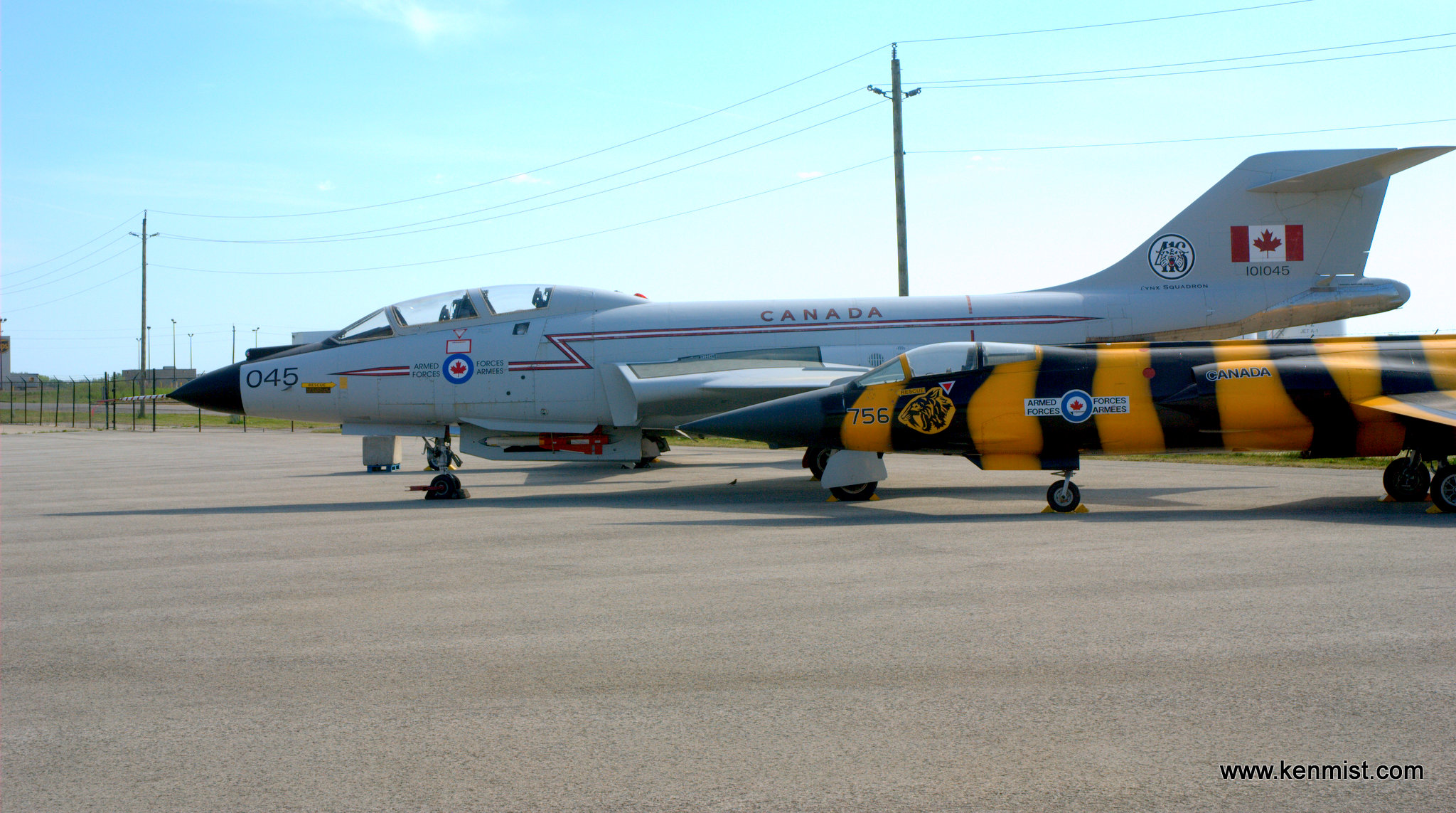
A CF-101 (background) on display at Hamilton International Airport. A CF-104 is in the foreground.

Two Voodoos remained in service after the stand-down: the unique EF-101B "Electric Voodoo" electronic jamming aircraft and a single CF-101F trainer with 414 Squadron at North Bay, Ontario. The EF-101B was a conversion of a regular F-101B, incorporating the electronic jamming suite from an EB-57E Canberra. Only one aircraft was converted before the program was cancelled and this sole example was leased to Canada. The EF-101B was returned to the United States on 7 April 1987, while CF-101F 101006 made the world's last Voodoo flight on 9 April 1987, as it made a delivery flight from CFB North Bay to CFB Greenwood via CFB Bagotville and CFB Chatham for eventual display at CFB Cornwallis, Nova Scotia, where it decorated the parade square at the Recruit School. After CFB Cornwallis closed in 1995, 006 was moved to the Cornwallis Military Museum; in October 2013, due to corrosion and security concerns, 006 was donated to the Jet Aircraft Museum in London, Ontario, where it is presently undergoing refurbishment.

Voodoo 101006 is currently on static display at the Jet Air Museum in London, Ontario, alongside its afterburners and missile cases.

== Variants ==
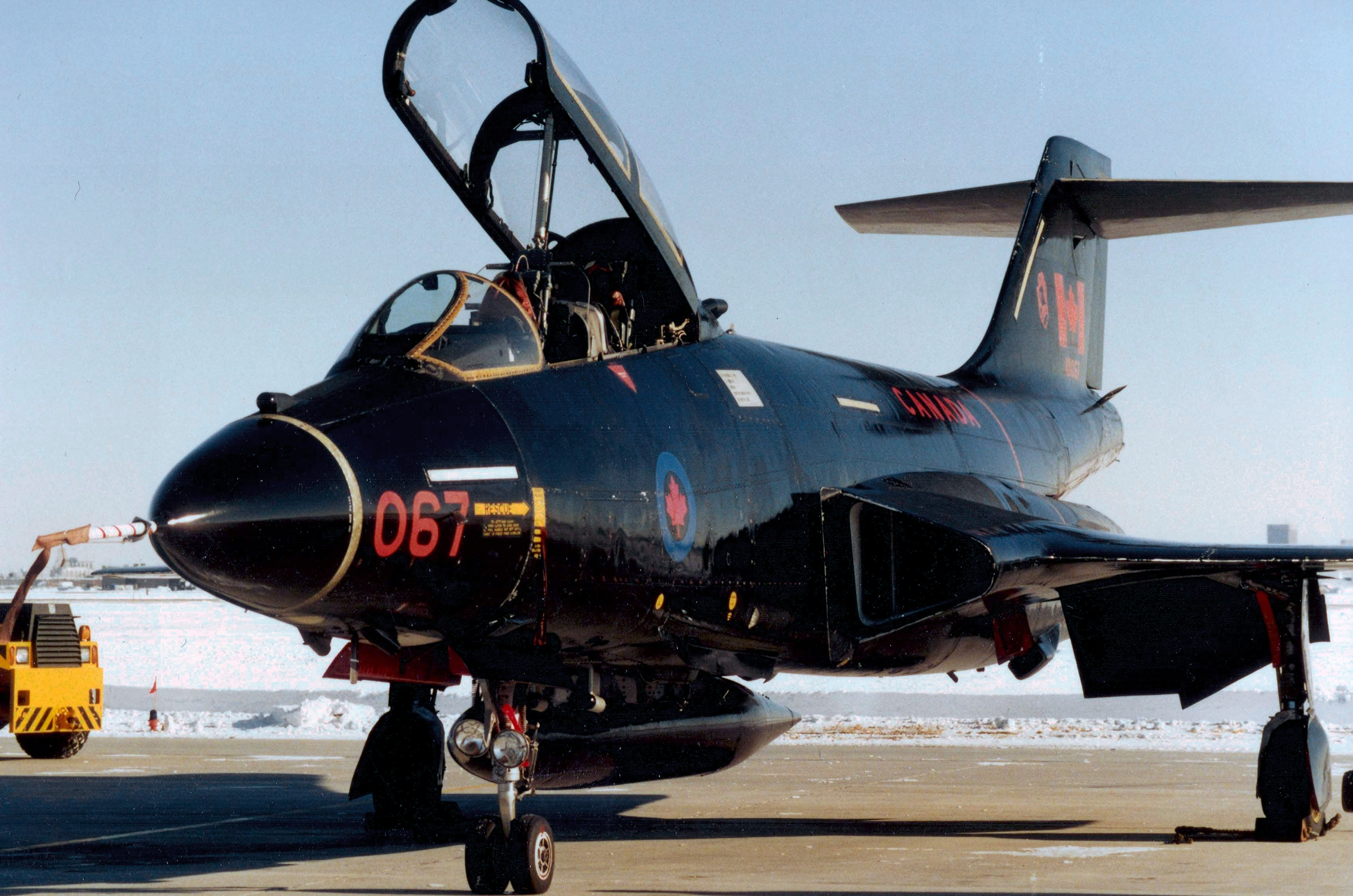
The EF-101B "Electric Voodoo" on its final deployment, 1987

- CF-101B : Two-seat all-weather interceptor fighter aircraft.
- CF-101F : Two-seat, dual control training aircraft.
- EF-101B : Electronic jamming aircraft.

== Operators ==
/ Canada

- Royal Canadian Air Force/Canadian Forces
  - No. 409 Squadron RCAF – CFB Comox
  - No. 410 Squadron RCAF – CFB Uplands
  - No. 414 Squadron RCAF – CFB North Bay
  - No. 416 Squadron RCAF – CFB Chatham
  - No. 425 Squadron RCAF – CFB Bagotville

=== Aircraft on display ===
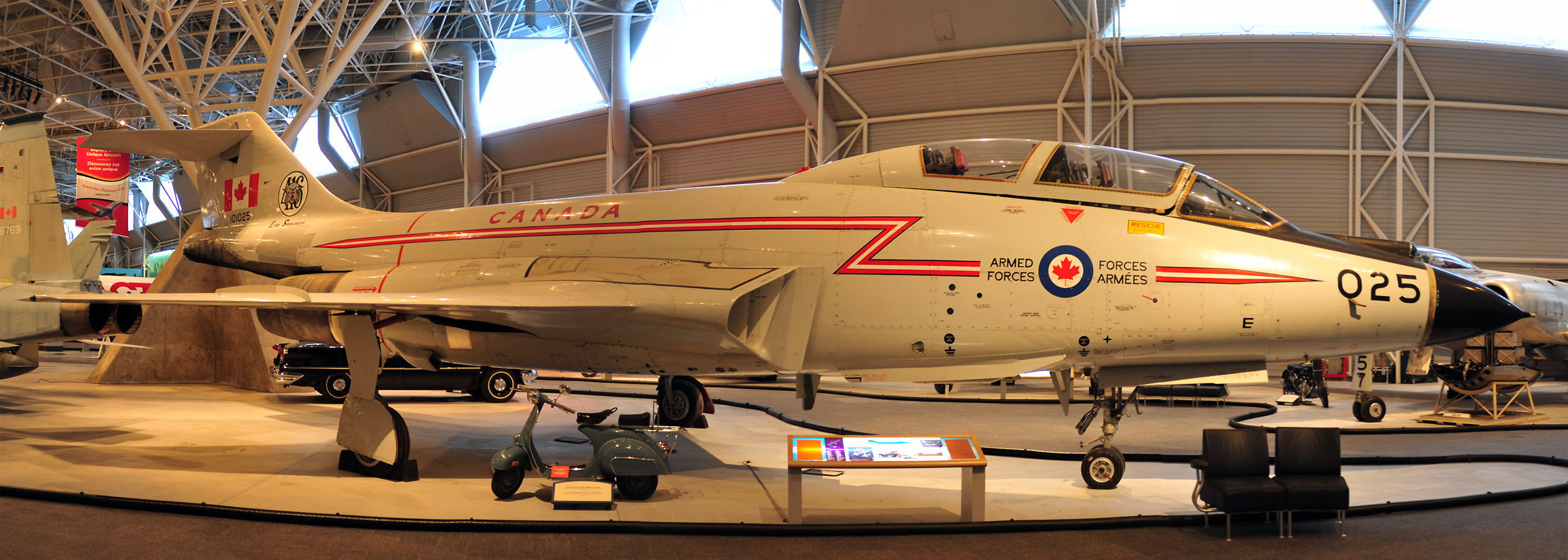
Royal Canadian Air Force McDonnell CF-101 Voodoo at the Canada Aviation and Space Museum.

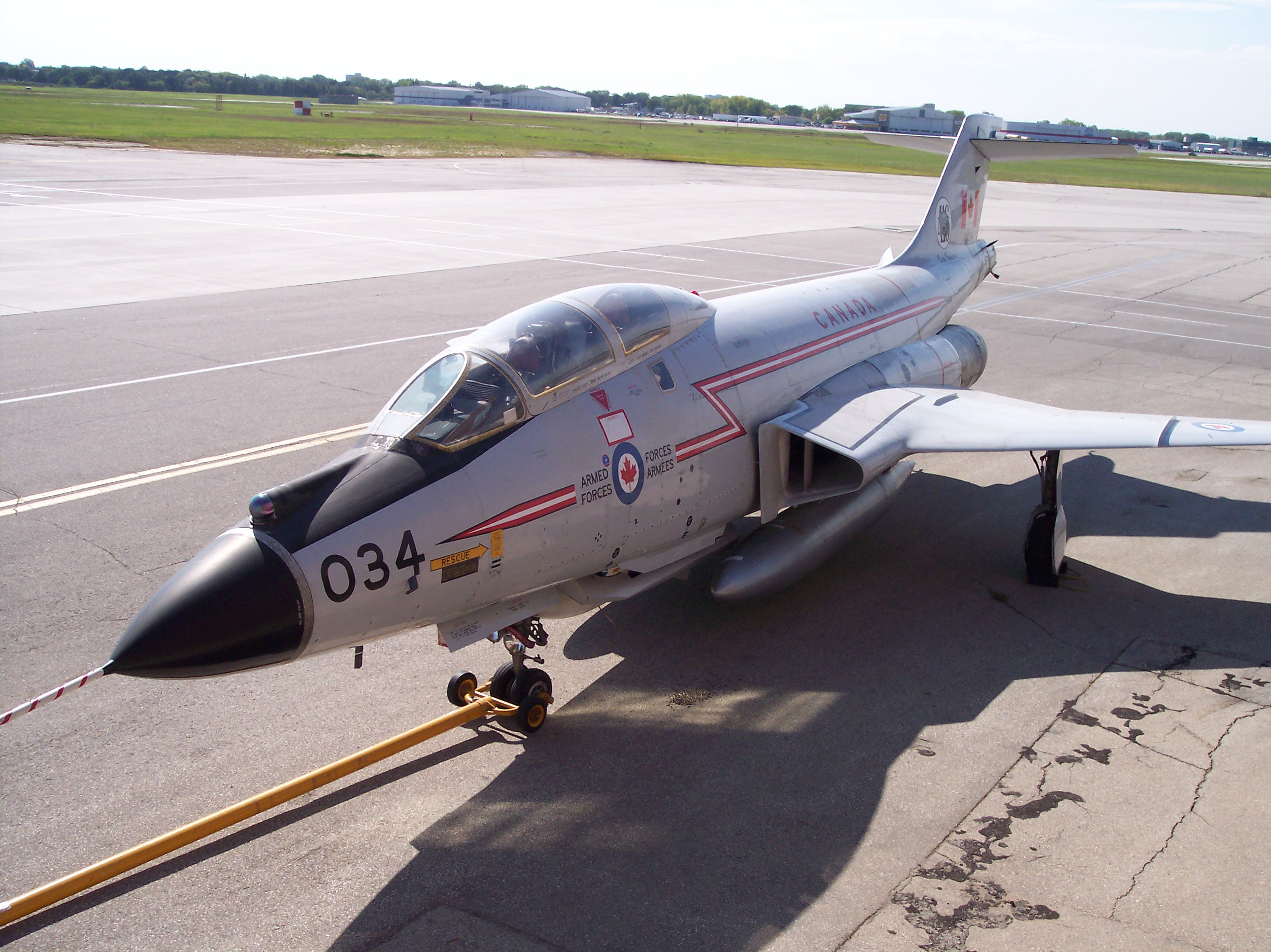
CF-101B at the Western Canada Aviation Museum, Winnipeg, Manitoba, c. 2005.

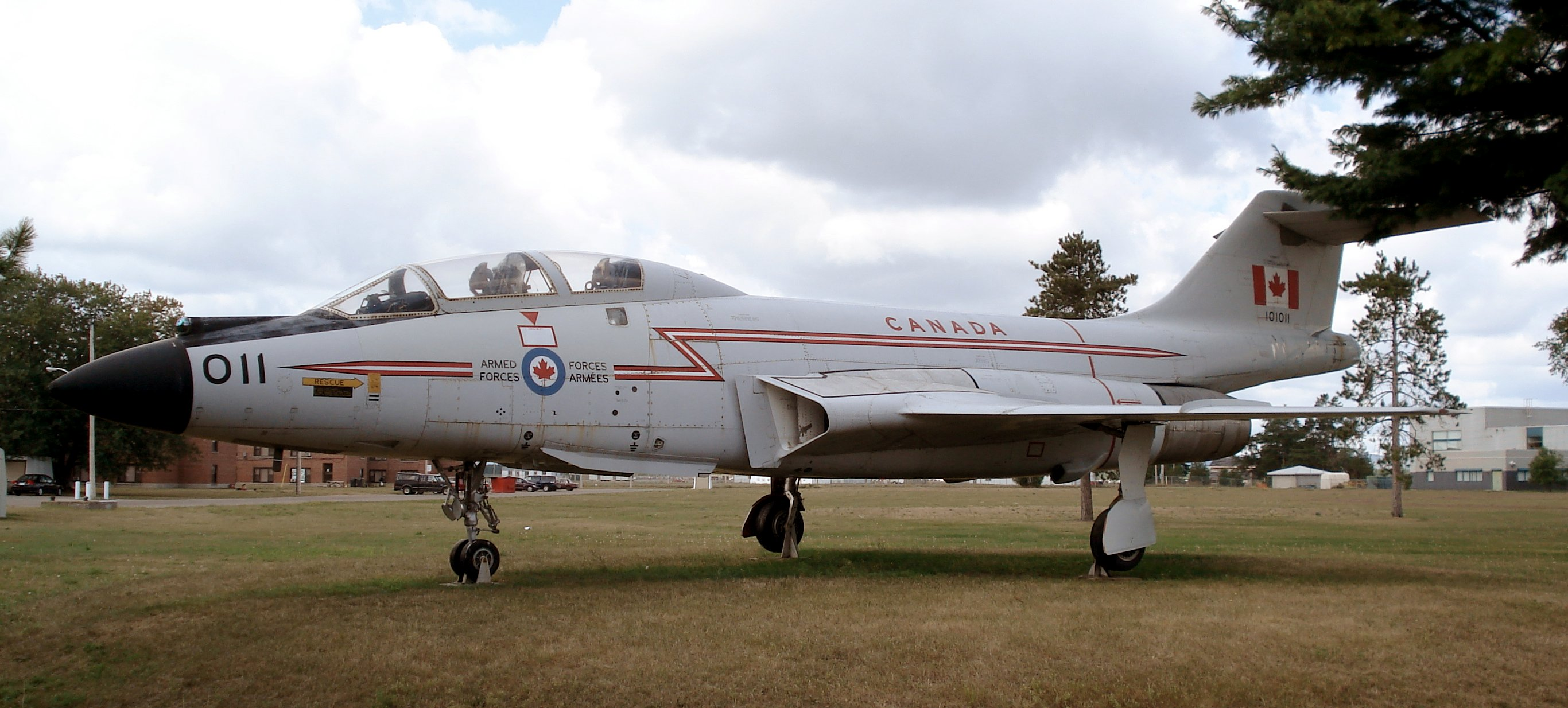
CF-101 displayed at CFB Borden.

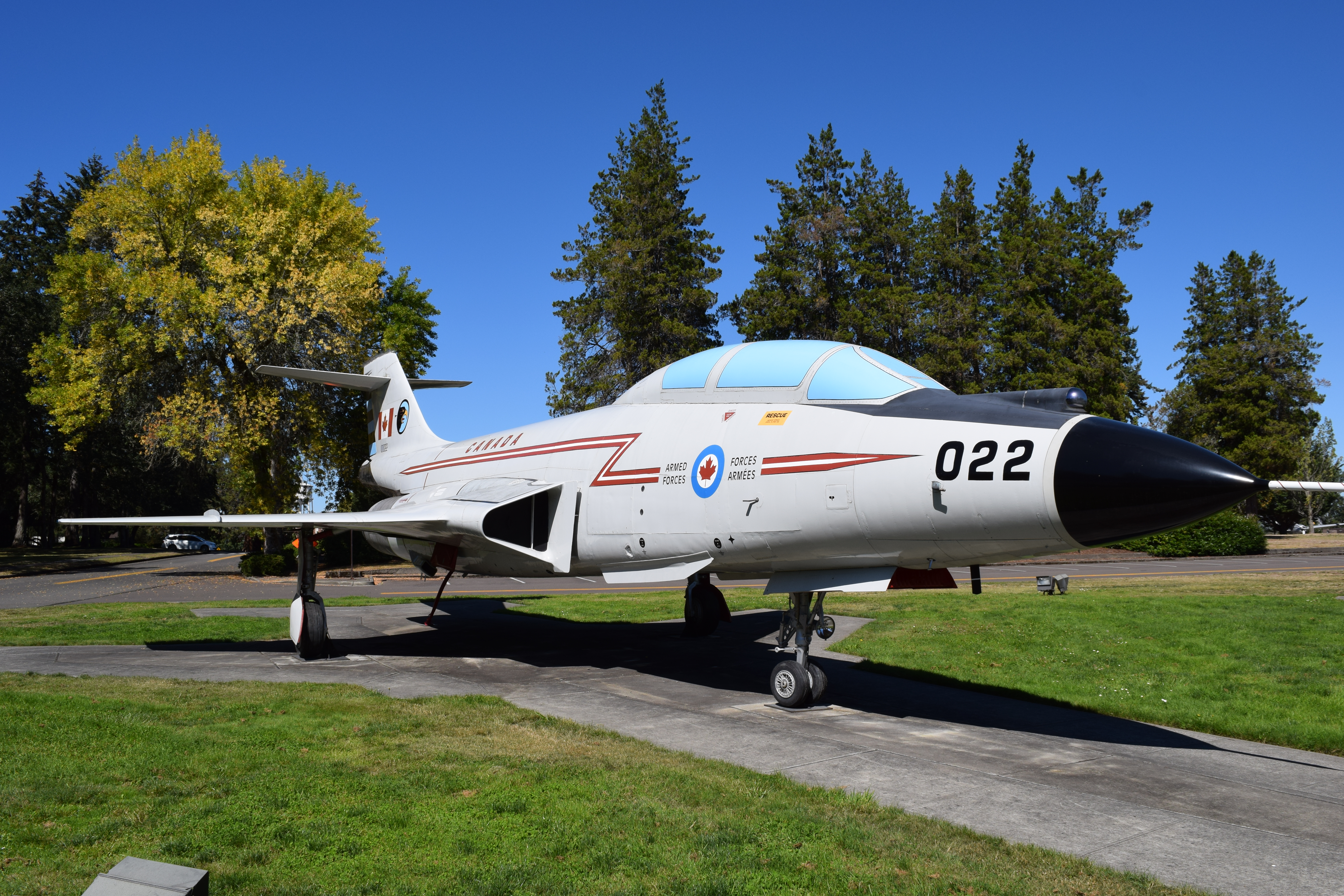
CF-101F S/N 101022 at McChord Air Force Base

Over 30 Canadian and ex-Canadian CF-101s are preserved in museums and as memorials in Canada and the United States.

== Specifications (F-101B) ==
Data from The Great Book of Fighters

General characteristics

- Crew: Two
- Length: 67 ft 5 in (20.55 m)
- Wingspan: 39 ft 8 in (12.09 m)
- Height: 18 ft 0 in (5.49 m)
- Wing area: 368 sq ft (34.20 m^{2})
- Airfoil: NACA 65A007 mod root, 65A006 mod tip
- Empty weight: 28,495 lb (12,925 kg)
- Gross weight: 45,665 lb (20,715 kg)
- Max takeoff weight: 52,400 lb (23,770 kg)
- Powerplant: 2 × Pratt & Whitney J57-P-55 afterburning turbojets, 11,990 lbf (53.3 kN) thrust each dry, 16,900 lbf (75 kN) with afterburner

Performance

- Maximum speed: 1,134 mph (1,825 km/h, 985 kn) at 35,000 ft (10,500 m)
- Maximum speed: Mach 1.72
- Range: 1,520 mi (2,450 km, 1,320 nmi)
- Service ceiling: 54,800 ft (17,800 m)
- Rate of climb: 36,500 ft/min (185 m/s)
- Wing loading: 124 lb/sq ft (607 kg/m^{2})
- Thrust/weight: 0.74

Armament

- Rockets: two AIR-2A Genie unguided nuclear rockets with 1.5 Kt warhead
- Missiles: Two AIM-4D Falcon heat-seeking air-to-air missiles

Avionics

- Hughes MG-13 fire control system

== See also ==
- Canada and weapons of mass destruction

Related development

- McDonnell F-101 Voodoo
- McDonnell XF-88 Voodoo

Aircraft of comparable role, configuration, and era

- Avro Canada CF-100 Canuck
- Convair F-106 Delta Dart
- Lavochkin La-250
- McDonnell Douglas F-4 Phantom II
- Tupolev Tu-28

Related lists

- List of fighter aircraft
- List of surviving McDonnell F-101 Voodoos
