= List of surviving McDonnell F-101 Voodoos =

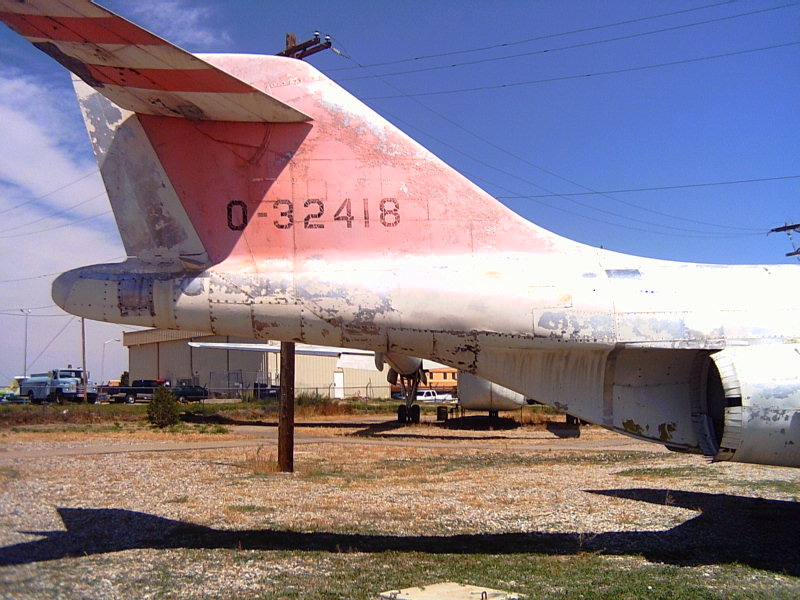
F-101A previously at Pueblo Weisbrod Aircraft Museum, Pueblo, CO

List of surviving McDonnell F-101 Voodoos identifies those Voodoos that are on display by country, model number, serial number, and location (museum or park and city); for USAF and other nations Voodoos.

The F-101 (USAF) and CF-101 (Canadian) were a Cold War supersonic escort fighter, interceptor, and tactical reconnaissance aircraft.

== Surviving aircraft ==
=== Canada ===
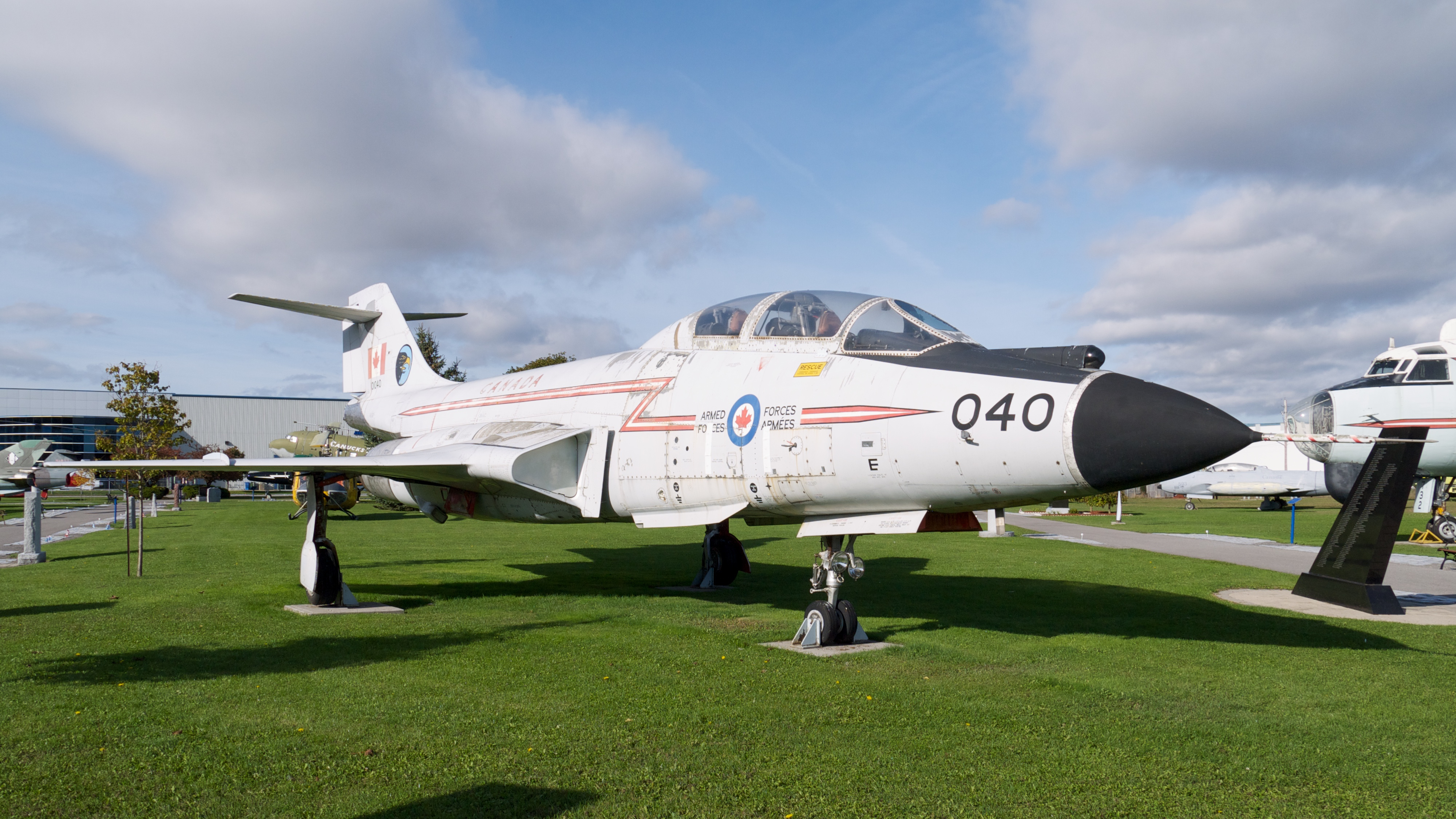
CF-101B tail number 101040 at National Air Force Museum of Canada

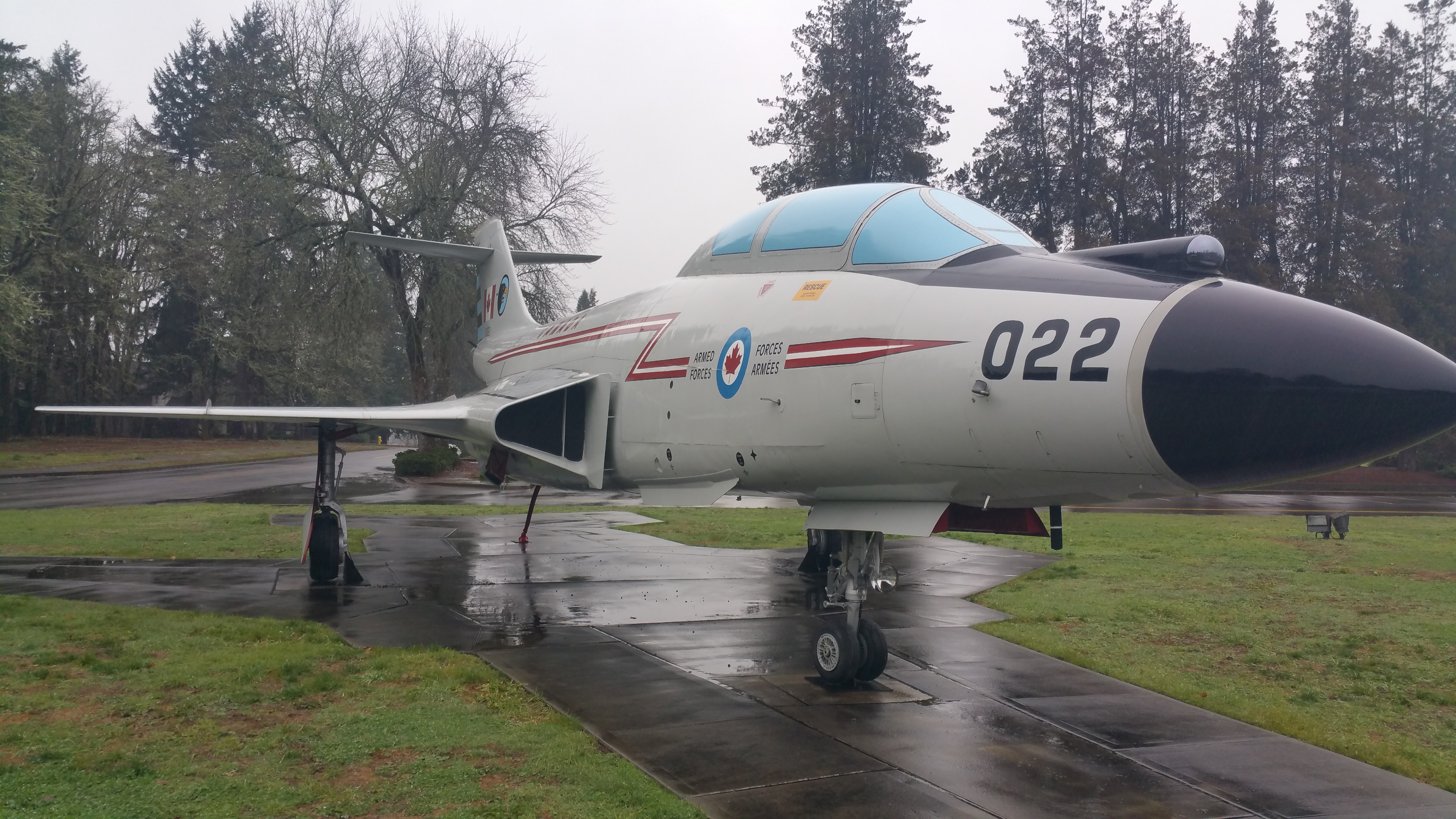
CF-101B tail number 101022 at McChord Air Museum

On display

CF-101B

- 101008 – Air Force Heritage Park, 17 Wing, Winnipeg, Manitoba. It is a monument fixed on a pedestal.
- 101011 – Base Borden Military Museum, 16 Wing Borden, Ontario.
- 101015 – Parc Commémoratif des Vétérans, Lévis, Quebec.
- 101021 – The Hangar Flight Museum, Calgary, Alberta.
- 101025 – Canada Aviation and Space Museum, Ottawa, Ontario.
- 101027 – Bagotville Air Defense Museum, 3 Wing Bagotville, Quebec.
- 101028 – New Brunswick Railway Museum, Hillsborough, New Brunswick.
- 101030 – Comox Air Force Museum Heritage Air Park, 19 Wing Comox, British Columbia.
- 101032 - The Military Museums, Calgary, Alberta.
- 101034 - Royal Aviation Museum of Western Canada, Winnipeg, Manitoba.
- 101035 – Abbotsford International Airport, Abbotsford, British Columbia *was not 101035 while in service.
- 101038 – Reynolds-Alberta Museum, Wetaskiwin, Alberta.
- 101040 – National Air Force Museum of Canada, 8 wing Trenton, Ontario.
- 101043 – Atlantic Canada Aviation Museum, Halifax, Nova Scotia.
- 101045 – Canadian Warplane Heritage Museum, Hamilton, Ontario.
- 101051 – Thetford Mines Airport, Thetford Mines, Quebec.
- 101053 – Pollard Blvd, Miramichi, New Brunswick
- 101057 – CFB Comox gate guard, CFB Comox, British Columbia.
- 101060 – Alberta Aviation Museum, Edmonton, Alberta.
- 101065 – North Atlantic Aviation Museum, Gander, Newfoundland and Labrador.

CF-101F

- 101002 – Canadian War Museum, Ottawa, Ontario.
- 101003 – Labrador Military Museum, 5 Wing Goose Bay, Newfoundland and Labrador.
- 101006 – Jet Aircraft Museum (JAM), London, Ontario.
- 101022 – McChord Air Museum McChord Field, Washington. The original serial number was 57-0322, and the aircraft was manufactured in the United States as the F-101F type.

EF-101B

- 101054 (displayed as 101067) - CFB North Bay

=== France ===
On display

F-101B

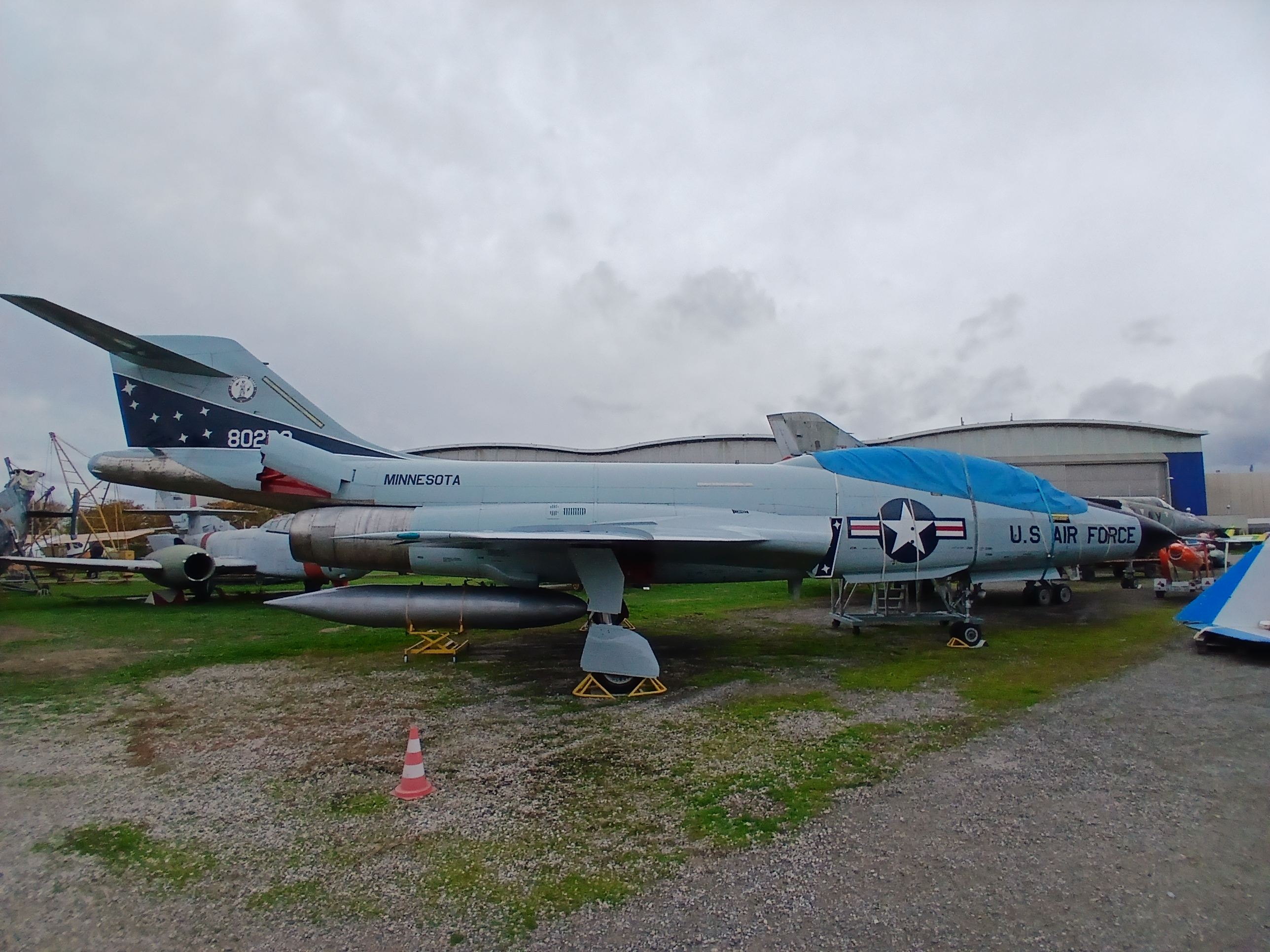
F101B Voodoo of the Minnesota Air National Guard at Ailes Anciennes Toulouse

- 58-0282 Minnesota Air National Guard – Ailes Anciennes Toulouse, Due to severe damage, it has beenrepainted and parts removed for repair.

=== Germany ===
On display

F-101B

- 58-0265 United States Air Force – Speyer Auto and Technik Museum

=== Taiwan ===
On display

RF-101A

- 54-1499 Republic of China Air Force – Hualien Airport.
- 54-1505 Republic of China Air Force – Chung Cheng Aviation Museum
- 54-1506 Republic of China Air Force – Aviation Education Exhibition Hall.

=== United Kingdom ===
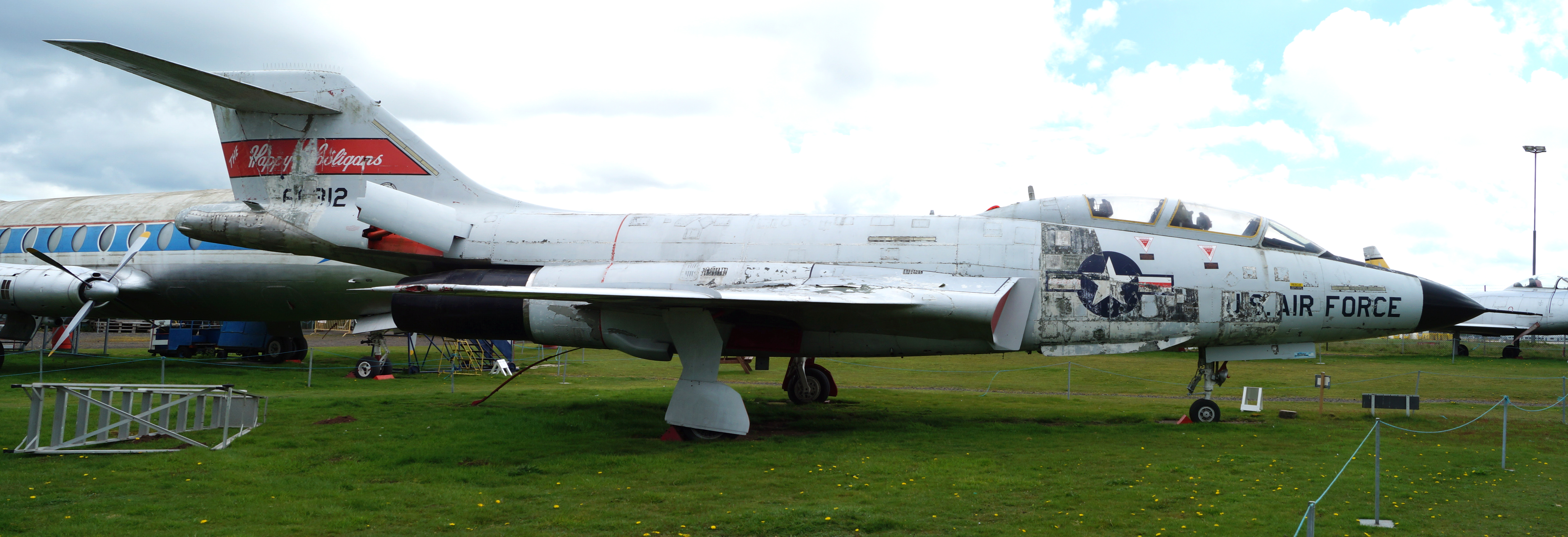
F-101F at Coventry Airport

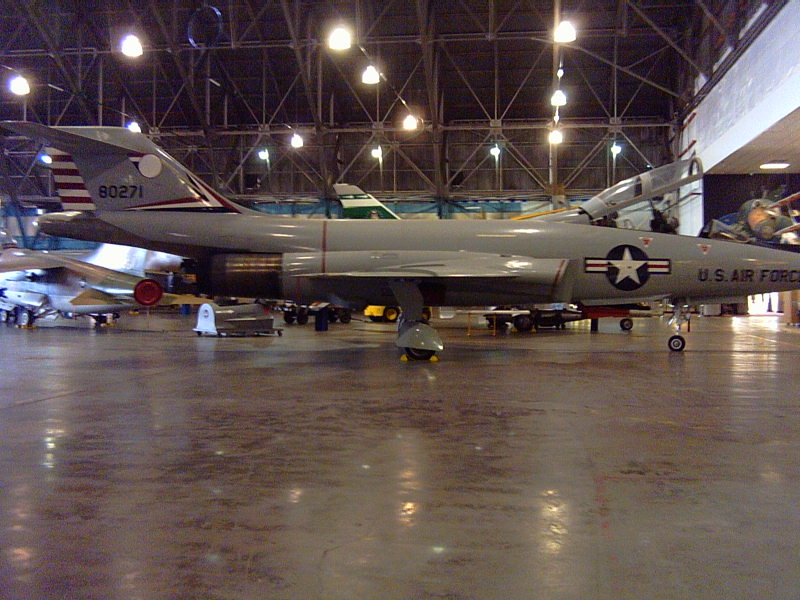
F-101B at Wings Museum

On display

TF-101B

- 56-0312 United States Air Force – Midland Air Museum, Coventry Airport.

=== United States ===
On display

F-101A

- 53-2418 – Evergreen Air and Space Museum, McMinnville, Oregon.
- 53-2422 – While not displayed as such, the aircraft sits derelict on the southeastern edge of the Edwards AFB photo range California, and has been located there since at least 1979.
- 54-1443 – In front of Atlantic Heating & Cooling, 553 Central Dr, Virginia Beach, VA 23454 as of July 2023.

CF-101B

- 101044 – Peterson Air and Space Museum, Peterson AFB, Colorado.

CF-101F

- 17400 – Valiant Air Command Warbird Museum, Space Coast Regional Airport, Titusville, Florida. The original serial number was 59-0400.

F-101B

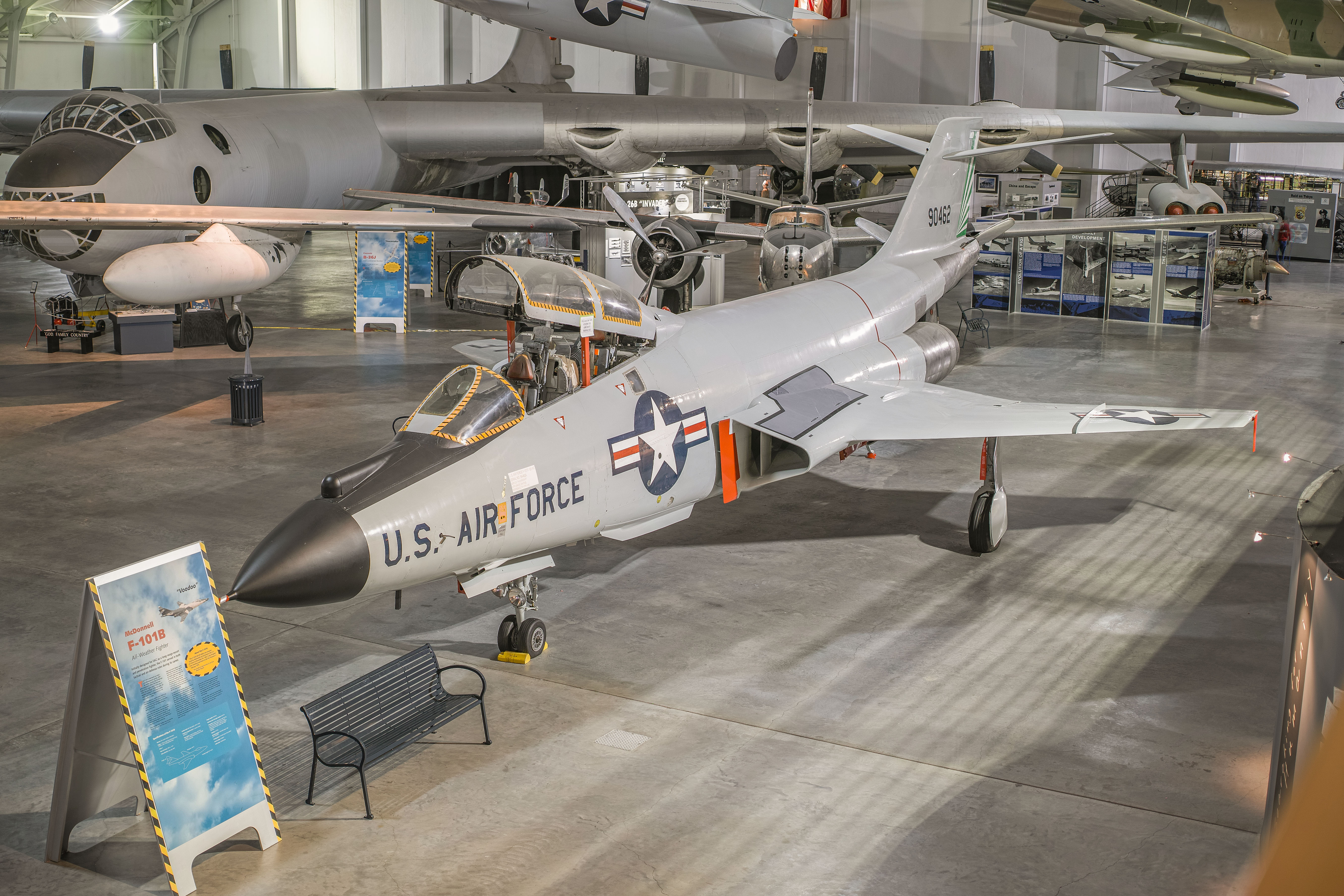
F-101B on display at the Strategic Air Command & Aerospace Museum in Nebraska

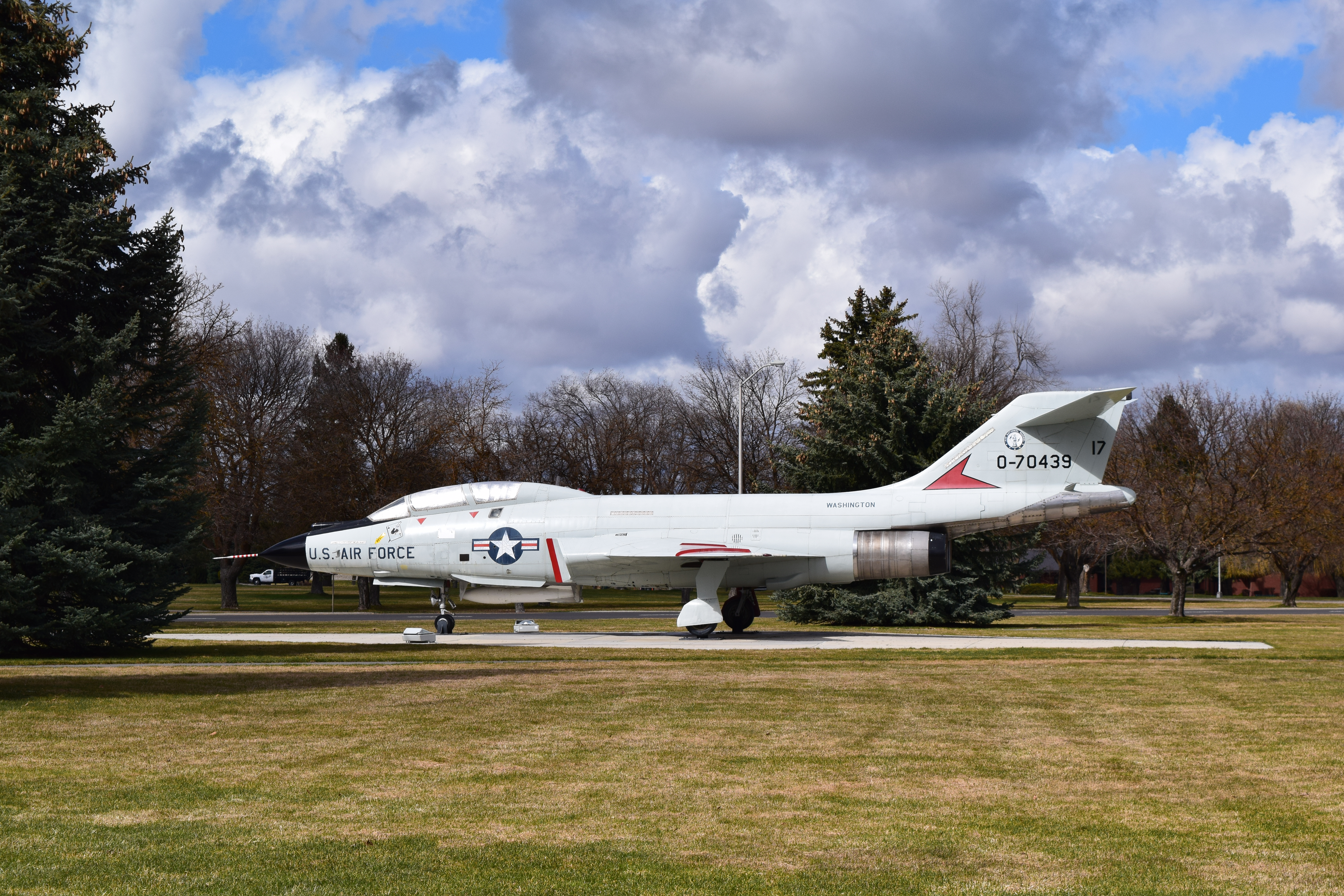
F-101B at Fairchild AFB

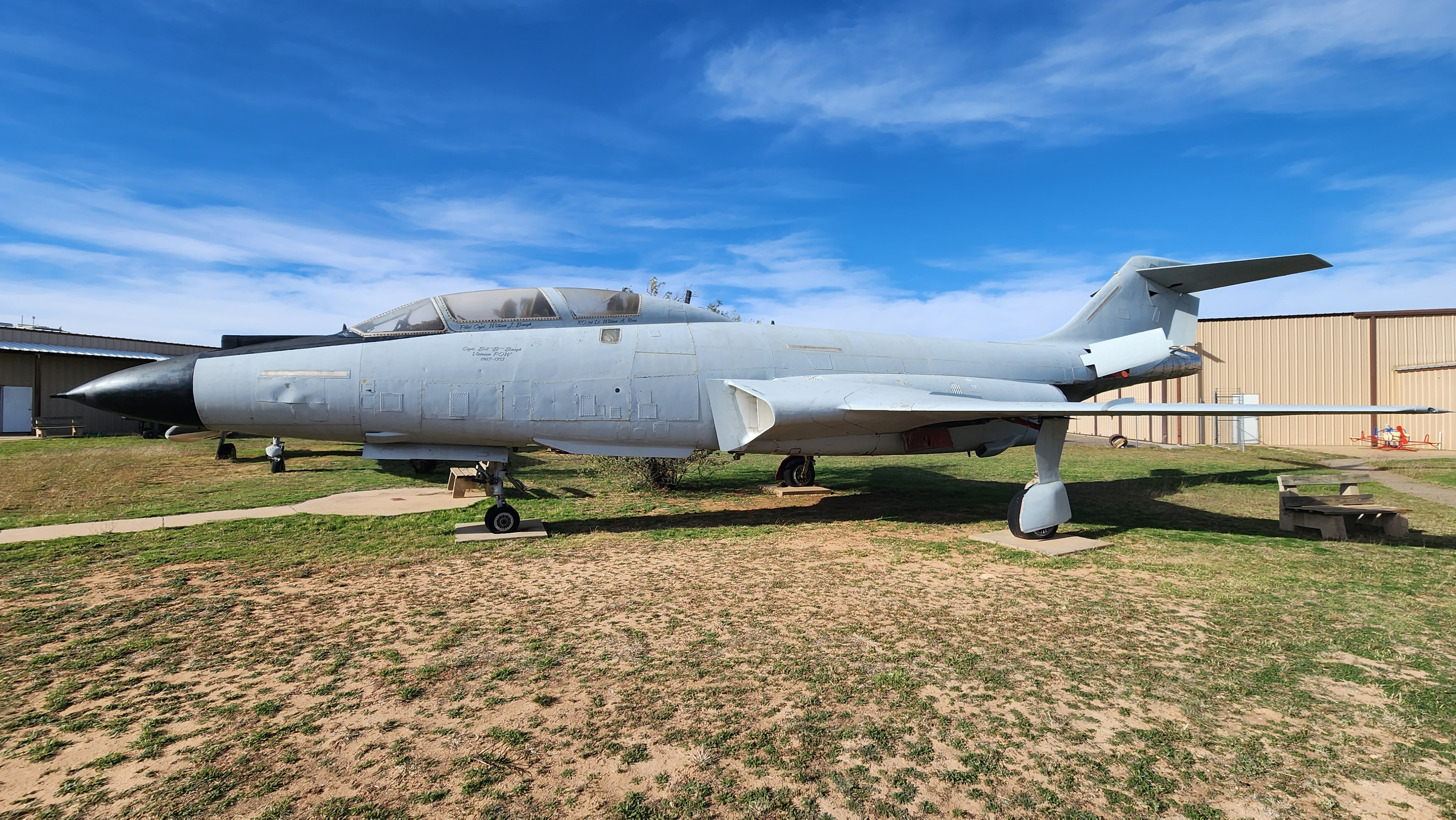
F-101 Voodoo at the Texas Air Museum in Slaton, Texas.

- 57-0252 – Hill Aerospace Museum, Hill AFB, Utah
- 57-0282 – Pima Air & Space Museum, adjacent to Davis-Monthan AFB, Tucson, Arizona
- 57-0294 – Washington National Guard Museum, Camp Murray, Washington. It is a monument fixed on a pedestal.
- 57-0308 – Wilmington Airport Collection, Wilmington Airport, Ohio.
- 57-0374 – Maine Air National Guard, Bangor Air National Guard Base, Bangor, Maine. It is a monument fixed on a pedestal.
- 57-0410 – Combat Air Museum, Topeka, Kansas. N8234, nickname, ‘the Gray Ghost'; previously at Colorado State University.
- 57-0412 – Castle Air Museum, Castle Airport (formerly Castle AFB), Atwater, California.
- 57-0417 (painted as 56-0417) – Callaway Recreational Complex, Callaway, Florida. It is a monument fixed on a pedestal.
- 57-0427 – Aerospace Museum of California, McClellan Airport (former McClellan AFB), Sacramento, California
- 57-0430 – American Legion Post 4, Mount Clemens, Michigan.
- 57-0436 – Celebrity Row, Davis-Monthan AFB (North Side), Tucson, Arizona. Under the control of the base, it is stored in a mothball state with the details covered with sheets.
- 58-0271 – Wings Over the Rockies Air and Space Museum at the former Lowry AFB, Denver, Colorado.
- 58-0273 – Poinsett Weapons Range, Sumter, South Carolina.
- 58-0274 – Peterson AFB, Colorado. Displayed near the AMC Passenger Terminal, formerly displayed near the West Gate.It is fixed with several pillars, making it impossible to take out the landing gear.
- 58-0281 – Boeing Park, Spirit of St. Louis Airport, Chesterfield, Missouri.
- 58-0285 – Travis Air Force Base Heritage Center (Jimmy Doolittle Air & Space Museum), Travis AFB, California
- 58-0288 – Air Force Flight Test Center Museum, Edwards AFB, California
- 58-0291 – K.I.Sawyer Heritage Museum at the former K.I. Sawyer AFB, K.I. Sawyer, Michigan
- 58-0300 – Minnesota ANG Museum, St. Paul, Minnesota
- 58-0301 – Portland International Airport/Portland Air National Guard Base, Portland, Oregon.
- 58-0303 – Glenn L. Martin Aviation Museum, Baltimore, Maryland The main wings have been removed so that it can be transported by land.
- 58-0312 – Veteran's Park, Rock Springs, Wyoming.
- 58-0315 – Grand Forks AFB, North Dakota.
- 58-0321 – Grissom Air Museum, Grissom ARB (former Grissom AFB), Indiana
- 58-0325 – National Museum of the United States Air Force, Wright-Patterson AFB, Dayton, Ohio
- 58-0329 – Vietnam Veterans Memorial, Rogers, Arkansas. It has become a monument fixed on a pedestal.
- 58-0332 – Evergreen Aviation & Space Museum, McMinnville, Oregon. It is currently dismantled and placed outside.
- 58-0335 – Fairchild AFB, Spokane, Washington.
- 58-0341 – Fargo ANGB, Fargo, North Dakota.
- 59-0412 – Tennessee ANGB, Chattanooga, Tennessee.
- 59-0417 – Pocatello Regional Airport, Pocatello, Idaho.
- 59-0418 – March Field Air Museum, March ARB (former March AFB), Riverside, California
- 59-0421 – Texas Air Museum - Stinson Chapter, San Antonio, Texas.
- 59-0423 – Winston Field Airport, Snyder, Texas. The aircraft is in poor condition overall, and there are defects in various parts of the aircraft.
- 59-0426 – South Dakota Air and Space Museum, Ellsworth AFB, South Dakota
- 59-0428 – Air Mobility Command Museum, Dover AFB, Delaware
- 59-0429 – Texas Air Museum, Slaton, Texas
- 59-0430 – Babe Zaharias Memorial, Beaumont, Texas. It is a monument fixed on a pedestal.
- 59-0462 – Strategic Air & Space Museum, Ashland, Nebraska
- 59-0471 – Historic Aviation Memorial Museum, Tyler, Texas. It is currently being transported to Fort Worth for restoration work.

RF-101B

- 59-0483 – May ANGB, Reno, Nevada.

JF-101B

- 56-0250 – Air Force Armament Museum, Eglin AFB, Florida

NF-101B

- 56-0235 – Yankee Air Museum, Belleville, Michigan
- 56-0273 – Rantoul National Aviation Center, Rantoul, Illinois. Formerly on display at Octave Chanute Aerospace Museum at the former Chanute AFB, Rantoul, Illinois. When this museum closed, the aircraft was to be sent to Southern Museum of Flight, Birmingham, Alabama. It was seen still on tarmac behind the former Octave Chanute Aerospace Museum in July 2018.

TF-101B

- 57-0287 – Linear Air Park, Dyess AFB, Abilene, Texas.

GF-101B

- 58-0290 – Security Police Training Area (north), Kelly Field (formerly Kelly AFB), San Antonio, Texas.

F-101C

- 56-0009 – Sheppard AFB, Wichita Falls, Texas.

RF-101C

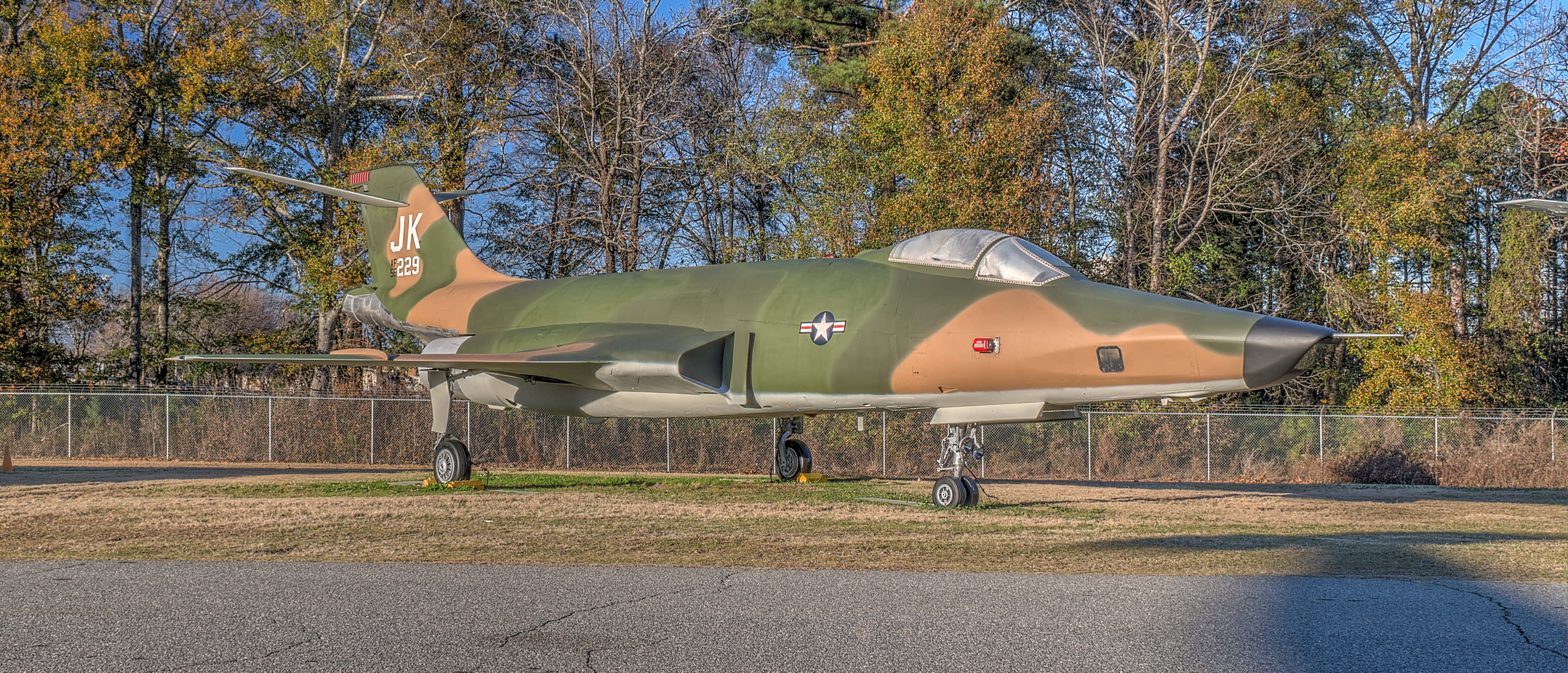
RF-101C display at the Museum of Aviation, Robins AFB

- 56-0048 – Selfridge Military Air Museum, Selfridge ANGB, Mount Clemens, Michigan
- 56-0057 – Camp Robinson National Guard Armory, North Little Rock, Arkansas.
- 56-0068 – Muse Manor front lawn (north), Keesler AFB, Biloxi, Mississippi.
- 56-0099 – Shaw AFB, South Carolina.
- 56-0112 – Gila Bend Municipal Airport Gila Bend, Arizona.
- 56-0119 – in storage at the Paul Garber Facility of the National Air and Space Museum in Silver Hill, Maryland.
- 56-0125 – The Aviation Museum of Kentucky, Blue Grass Airport, Lexington, Kentucky
- 56-0130 – Gila Bend Municipal Airport, Gila Bend, Arizona.
- 56-0135 – Maxwell AFB, Alabama.
- 56-0166 – National Museum of the United States Air Force, Wright-Patterson AFB, Dayton, Ohio
- 56-0185 – Niagara Falls ANGB, Niagara Falls, New York.
- 56-0210 – Museum of Aviation, Robins AFB, Warner Robins, Georgia
- 56-0214 – Pima Air & Space Museum, adjacent to Davis-Monthan AFB, Tucson, Arizona
- 56-0217 – George Robert Hall Airpark, Bobby Chain Airport, Hattiesburg, Mississippi.
- 56-0229 – Museum of Aviation, Warner Robins AFB, Macon, Georgia
- 56-0231 – Little Rock AFB, Jacksonville, Arkansas.

F-101F

- 56-0246 – Air Power Park, Hampton, Virginia.
- 57-0342 – MAPS Air Museum, North Canton, Ohio
- 58-0269 – James J. Eagan Civic Center, Florissant, Missouri.
- 58-0276 – Museum of Aviation, Robins AFB, Warner Robins, Georgia
- 58-0311 – Devils Lake Municipal Airport, Devils Lake, North Dakota. It is a monument fixed with pillars.
- 58-0324 – Heritage Air Park, Palmdale, California.
- 58-0338 – Buffalo Naval and Servicemens Park, Buffalo, New York.
- 59-0407 – Proctor City Ball Park, Proctor, Minnesota. It is a monument that houses the landing gear and is fixed to a pillar.
- 59-0413 – Empire State Aerosciences Museum, Glenville, New York
- 59-0419 – Malmstrom AFB, Great Falls, Montana It is a monument that houses the landing gear and is fixed to a pillar.

RF-101H

- 56-0001 – Louisville Air National Guard Base, Louisville International Airport, Louisville, Kentucky.
- 56-0011 – Ebing ANG - 188th Tactical Fighter Group, Fort Smith, Arkansas.

== See also ==
- McDonnell XF-88 Voodoo
- McDonnell CF-101 Voodoo
