= List of Royal Canadian Air Force squadrons =

The Royal Canadian Air Force existed from 1924 to 1968, later designated Canadian Forces Air Command under the Canadian Forces, and then renamed to its original historic name of Royal Canadian Air Force in 2011. These are the squadrons that have served with Canada's air force since 1924.

== Early squadrons ==
These early squadron numbers have a history going back to the post-First World War Canadian Air Force which disbanded in 1920. These units were formed after the creation of the RCAF in 1924.

- No. 1 Squadron RCAF
- No. 2 Squadron RCAF
- No. 3 Squadron RCAF
- No. 4 Squadron RCAF
- No. 5 Squadron RCAF
- No. 6 Squadron RCAF
- No. 7 Squadron RCAF
- No. 8 Squadron RCAF
- No. 9 Squadron RCAF
- No. 10 Squadron RCAF
- No. 11 Squadron RCAF
- No. 12 Squadron RCAF
- No. 13 Squadron RCAF
- No. 14 Squadron RCAF
- No. 18 Squadron RCAF

== 100-series squadrons ==
Established in Canada in the 1930s most of these units were either disbanded or reassigned a 400 series number for overseas service.

- No. 110 Squadron RCAF
- No. 111 Squadron RCAF
- No. 112 Squadron RCAF
- No. 113 Squadron RCAF
- No. 114 Squadron RCAF
- No. 115 Squadron RCAF
- No. 116 Squadron RCAF
- No. 117 Squadron RCAF
- No. 118 Squadron RCAF
- No. 119 Squadron RCAF
- No. 120 Squadron RCAF
- No. 121 Squadron RCAF
- No. 122 Squadron RCAF
- No. 123 Squadron RCAF
- No. 124 Squadron RCAF
- No. 125 Squadron RCAF
- No. 126 Squadron RCAF
- No. 127 Squadron RCAF
- No. 128 Squadron RCAF
- No. 129 Squadron RCAF
- No. 130 Squadron RCAF
- No. 131 Squadron RCAF
- No. 132 Squadron RCAF
- No. 133 Squadron RCAF - established at Lethbridge, Alberta on 3 June 1942. The squadron was issued with Canadian-built Hawker Hurricanes. The squadron moved to RCAF Station Boundary Bay, BC, on 4 October 1942.
- No. 134 Squadron RCAF
- No. 135 Squadron RCAF
- No. 145 Squadron RCAF
- No. 147 Squadron RCAF
- No. 149 Squadron RCAF
- No. 160 Squadron RCAF
- No. 161 Squadron RCAF
- No. 162 Squadron RCAF
- No. 163 Squadron RCAF
- No. 164 Squadron RCAF
- No. 165 Squadron RCAF
- No. 166 Squadron RCAF
- No. 167 Squadron RCAF
- No. 168 Squadron RCAF
- No. 170 Squadron RCAF

== 400-series squadrons ==
During the Second World War, the British Commonwealth Air Training Plan (BCATP) set out co-operation between the various British Commonwealth air forces. Under Article XV of the BCATP, RCAF squadrons were attached to and/or formed within British RAF operational formations. These squadrons were known as 'Article XV squadrons'. To avoid confusion with squadron numbers of other Commonwealth nations, RCAF units were assigned squadron numbers from 400 to 449. Not all squadrons up No. 449 were formed, however. This squadron series continued through the post-war years, and the majority of current Royal Canadian Air Force operational squadrons are still numbered in the 400s due to their legacy as wartime units. For this historical reason current squadrons are listed here with their original RCAF names.

- 400 Squadron RCAF
- 401 Squadron RCAF
- 402 Squadron RCAF
- 403 Squadron RCAF
- 404 Squadron RCAF
- 405 Squadron RCAF
- 406 Squadron RCAF
- 407 Squadron RCAF
- 408 Squadron RCAF
- 409 Squadron RCAF
- 410 Squadron RCAF
- 411 Squadron RCAF
- 412 Squadron RCAF
- 413 Squadron RCAF
- 414 Squadron RCAF
- 415 Squadron RCAF
- 416 Squadron RCAF
- 417 Squadron RCAF
- 418 Squadron RCAF
- 419 Squadron RCAF
- 420 Squadron RCAF
- 421 Squadron RCAF
- 422 Squadron RCAF
- 423 Squadron RCAF
- 424 Squadron RCAF
- 425 Squadron RCAF
- 426 Squadron RCAF
- 427 Squadron RCAF
- 428 Squadron RCAF
- 429 Squadron RCAF
- 430 Squadron RCAF
- 431 Squadron RCAF
- 432 Squadron RCAF
- 433 Squadron RCAF
- 434 Squadron RCAF
- 435 Squadron RCAF
- 436 Squadron RCAF
- 437 Squadron RCAF
- 438 Squadron RCAF
- 439 Squadron RCAF
- 440 Squadron RCAF
- 441 Squadron RCAF
- 442 Squadron RCAF
- 443 Squadron RCAF

== 600-series squadrons ==
During the Second World War pilots who served in the 600-series RCAF squadrons were recruited from the Royal Canadian Artillery in England and Italy, and trained to fly at No. 2 Elementary Flying Training School RAF Cambridge (England), completing their operational flying training at 43 O.T.U. (RAF Andover). Observers were trained at Larkhill (England); these were selected 'Other Ranks' from the Royal Canadian Air Force and Royal Canadian Artillery. The three Canadian 'air observation post' squadrons operated under the command of No. 70 Group RAF, RAF Fighter Command; the first two squadrons saw action while serving with No. 84 Group RAF, RAF Second Tactical Air Force.

- No. 664 Squadron RCAF
- No. 665 Squadron RCAF
- No. 666 Squadron RCAF

== Post-war squadrons ==
Subsequent to the Second World War the RCAF expanded their squadron numbers to include 444–450. No. 450 was also a Royal Australian Air Force squadron during the war and the Canadian squadron duplicated the number by error, which was discovered when No. 450 Squadron RCAF was formed in 1968.

- No. 444 Squadron RCAF
- No. 445 Squadron RCAF
- No. 446 Squadron RCAF
- No. 447 Squadron RCAF
- No. 448 Squadron RCAF
- No. 449 Squadron RCAF
- No. 450 Squadron RCAF

== Other squadrons ==
- 21 Aerospace Control and Warning Squadron
- 103 Search and Rescue Squadron – This unit was operational in the RCAF from 1947 to 1968. Initially as 103 Search and Rescue Flight it was renamed as 103 Rescue Unit in 1950 and remained active until 1968. It was reactivated in 1977 by the Canadian Forces and redesignated a squadron in 1997.
- 107 Rescue Unit – formerly a detachment of 103 Search and Rescue Squadron was created in 1954 and remained there until the RCAF left and transferred it back to Transport Canada as civilian airport St. John's International Airport.
- No. 242 (Canadian) Squadron RAF
- 10 Squadron or Heavier-than-air Experimental Air Squadron VX 10 – not part of RCAF (or mistaken for No. 10 Squadron RCAF) it was established in 1953 to test and evaluate aircraft for the Royal Canadian Navy within the Royal Canadian Naval Air Station Shearwater. It was disbanded in 1970.

== See also ==
- List of Royal Air Force aircraft squadrons
- List of Fleet Air Arm aircraft squadrons
- List of Army Air Corps aircraft units
