= RCAF Eastern Air Command =

Eastern Air Command
- Active: 15 November 1938 – 1 March 1947
- Country: Canada
- Allegiance: Canada
- Branch: Royal Canadian Air Force
- Part of: RCAF Home War Establishment, Canadian Northwest Atlantic Command (after 1943)
- Motto(s): Seaward
- Engagements: Second World War: Battle of the Atlantic; Battle of the St. Lawrence

Eastern Air Command was the part of the Royal Canadian Air Force's Home War Establishment responsible for air operations on the Atlantic coast of Canada during the Second World War. It played a critical role in anti-submarine operations in Canadian and Newfoundland waters during the Battle of the Atlantic. Eastern Air Command also had several fighter squadrons and operational training units under its umbrella.

== Order of battle ==
=== 10 September 1939 ===
HQ Halifax, Nova Scotia.

Squadron	Type of Aircraft	Station
No. 1 Squadron RCAF	Hawker Hurricane	RCAF Station St. Hubert
No. 2 Squadron RCAF	Armstrong Whitworth Atlas	RCAF Station Saint John - disbanded 16 December
No. 5 Squadron RCAF	Supermarine Stranraer	RCAF Station Dartmouth
No. 8 Squadron RCAF	Northrop Delta	RCAF Station Sydney
No. 10 Squadron RCAF	Westland Wapiti	RCAF Station Halifax
No. 116 Squadron RCAF	No aircraft	RCAF Station Halifax - disbanded 2 November
No. 117 Squadron RCAF	No aircraft	RCAF Station Saint John - disbanded 28 October

=== 1 January 1943 ===
HQ Halifax, Nova Scotia

Squadron	Type of Aircraft	Station
No. 10 Squadron RCAF	Douglas Digby	RCAF Station Dartmouth
No. 11 Squadron RCAF	Lockheed Hudson	RCAF Station Dartmouth
No. 113 Squadron RCAF	Lockheed Hudson	RCAF Station Yarmouth
No. 116 Squadron RCAF	Consolidated PBY Catalina	RCAF Station Dartmouth
No. 117 Squadron RCAF	Consolidated Canso	RCAF Station Dartmouth
No. 119 Squadron RCAF	Lockheed Hudson	RCAF Station Sydney
No. 121 Squadron RCAF	Various	RCAF Station Dartmouth
No. 126 Squadron RCAF	Hawker Hurricane	RCAF Station Dartmouth
No. 128 Squadron RCAF	Hawker Hurricane	RCAF Station Dartmouth
No. 129 Squadron RCAF	Hawker Hurricane	RCAF Station Dartmouth
No. 130 Squadron RCAF	Hawker Hurricane	RCAF Station Bagotville
No. 162 Squadron RCAF	Consolidated Canso	RCAF Station Yarmouth

No. 1 Group. HQ St. John's, Newfoundland

Squadron	Type of Aircraft	Station
No. 5 Squadron RCAF	Consolidated Canso	RCAF Station Gander
No. 125 Squadron RCAF	Hawker Hurricane	RCAF Station Torbay
No. 127 Squadron RCAF	Hawker Hurricane	RCAF Station Torbay
No. 145 Squadron RCAF	Lockheed Hudson	RCAF Station Torbay

=== 6 June 1944 ===
HQ Halifax, Nova Scotia

Squadron	Type of Aircraft	Station
No. 113 Squadron RCAF	Lockheed Ventura	RCAF Station Yarmouth - Moved to Torbay 21 June, disbanded 23 August
No. 119 Squadron RCAF	Lockheed Hudson	RCAF Station Sydney
No. 121 Squadron RCAF	Various	RCAF Station Dartmouth
No. 126 Squadron RCAF	Hawker Hurricane	RCAF Station Dartmouth
No. 128 Squadron RCAF	Hawker Hurricane	RCAF Station Dartmouth
No. 145 Squadron RCAF	Lockheed Ventura	RCAF Station Yarmouth
No. 160 Squadron RCAF	Consolidated Canso	RCAF Station Yarmouth
No. 167 Squadron RCAF	Various	RCAF Station Dartmouth

No. 1 Group, HQ St. John's, Newfoundland

Squadron	Type of Aircraft	Station
No. 5 Squadron RCAF	Consolidated Canso	RCAF Station Torbay
No. 10 Squadron RCAF	Consolidated B-24 Liberator	RCAF Station Torbay
No. 11 Squadron RCAF	Consolidated B-24 Liberator	RCAF Station Torbay - Moved to Dartmouth 18 June
No. 116 Squadron RCAF	Consolidated Canso	RCAF Station Gander
No. 127 Squadron RCAF	Hawker Hurricane	RCAF Station Gander
No. 129 Squadron RCAF	Hawker Hurricane	RCAF Station Dartmouth

No. 5 (Gulf) Group, HQ Gaspé, Quebec

Squadron	Type of Aircraft	Station
No. 161 Squadron RCAF	Consolidated Canso	RCAF Station Gaspé
No. 162 Squadron RCAF	Consolidated Canso	RAF Reykjavik - On loan to Coastal Command
No. 119 Squadron RCAF	Lockheed Hudson	RCAF Mount Joli - Disbanded in March 1944

== No. 12 (Operational Training) Group ==
No. 12 Group was headquartered at Halifax, Nova Scotia and No. 3 Training Command RCAF had its headquarters at Montreal, Quebec.

No. 3 Training Command provided training for the British Commonwealth Air Training Plan (BCATP), flying from air bases throughout Quebec and the Maritime provinces. The schools were operated by the RAF or the RCAF however the operational training units were RCAF units and under command of No. 12 Group, RCAF Eastern Air Command. The assigned training schools and units conducted advanced flying courses including Service Flying Training (SFTS), Air Observer (AOS), Bombing and Gunnery (BGS), General Reconnaissance (ocean patrol) (GRS), Naval Aerial Gunnery (NAGS), Air Navigation (ANS) and Operational (OTU) training throughout the war (see the following table).

Together with some of the advanced aircraft types these units mainly flew hundreds of older bomber and patrol aircraft that had been relegated to armed training roles. Training Command aircraft were very active everywhere over the entire Eastern Command Area of Operations and therefore made an important contribution to the surveillance of the region acting as a force multiplier -providing extra eyes and ears on watch for enemy U-Boats during flying patrols -particularly during the emergency of the Battle of the St. Lawrence when some of the units temporarily took part as a stop gap measure.

A good example of the training schools involvement in operations with the EAC during the emergency of the battle is illustrated by author Hugh A. Haliday wrote: "The need for Atlantic patrols was undiminished, yet the Battle of the St. Lawrence stretched EAC resources. Based at Charlottetown, 31 General Reconnaissance School was mobilized to fly patrols using Avro Ansons, each carrying two 250-pound bombs. At the very outset of the war the Anson and its ordnance had failed in RAF anti-submarine work. Now in Canada it was remobilized as an aerial scarecrow. German views varied as to Canadian countermeasures. The captain of U-517 found his operations increasingly restricted by strengthened air patrols. In October 1942, U-69 reported "strong sea patrol and constant patrol by aircraft with radar."

Squadron	Type of Aircraft	Station
No. 1 GRS BCATP	Avro Anson	RCAF Summerside PEI
No. 31 GRS BCATP	Avro Anson	RCAF Charlotteown PEI
No. 2 ANS BCATP	Avro Anson	RCAF Charlotteown PEI
No. 32 Air Navigation School RAF	Avro Anson	RCAF Charlottetown PEI
No. 9 SFTS BCATP	Avro Anson	RCAF Summerside PEI - moved to RCAF Centralia ON July 1942
No. 8 SFTS BCATP	Avro Anson	RCAF Moncton NB
No. 13 SFTS BCATP	North American Harvard	RCAF St. Hubert PQ - moved to N. Battleford SK Feb 1944
No. 8 Air Observer School	Avro Anson	RCAF Quebec City PQ
No. 9 Air Observers School RCAF	Avro Anson	RCAF St. Jean PQ
No. 10 AOS BCATP	Avro Anson	RCAF Chatham NB
No. 9 BGS BCATP	Avro Anson, Bristol Bolingbroke, Westland Lysander, Fairey Battle	RCAF Mt. Joli PQ
No. 10 BGS BCATP	Avro Anson, Bristol Bolingbroke, Westland Lysander, Fairey Battle	RCAF Mt. Pleasant PEI
No. 1 OTU BCATP	Hawker Hurricane	RCAF Bagotville PQ
No. 7 OTU BCATP	Lockheed Hudson, DeHavilland Mosquito	RCAF Debert NS
No. 6 OTU BCATP	Avro Anson, Bristol Beaufort, Handley Page Hampden, Fairey Swordfish	RCAF Greenwood NS
No. 8 OTU BCATP	Lockheed Hudson, DeHavilland Mosquito	RCAF Greenwood NS
No. 34 OTU BCATP	Lockheed Ventura	RCAF Pennfield Ridge NS
No. 1 NAGS BCATP	Fairey Swordfish	Yarmouth NS

== See also ==
- RCAF Western Air Command
- David Ernest Hornell
- Convoy ONS 5
- Battle of the St. Lawrence
- Leonard Birchall
- Canadian Northwest Atlantic
