= No. 119 Squadron RCAF =

- Active: 15 May 1935 – 15 March 1944
- Country: Canada
- Branch: Royal Canadian Air Force
- Role: Bomber-Reconnaissance
- Nickname: Hamilton Tigers
- Mottos: Latin: Noli Me Tangere ("Touch Me Not")
- Battle honours: North-West Atlantic 1940–44

Insignia
- Squadron Codes: DM (May 1938 - June 1942), GR (April 1942 - March 1944)

No. 119 Squadron was an RCAF Canadian Home War Establishment (HWE) Squadron. Created 15 May 1935 in Hamilton, Ontario, it came to be tasked with coastal patrol and anti-submarine duty over the Gulf of St. Lawrence and the Atlantic Ocean around Nova Scotia. It was disbanded 15 March 1944 in Sydney, Nova Scotia.

== The 'Hamilton Tigers' Squadron ==
Originally formed as No. 19 (Bomber) Squadron (Auxiliary) in Hamilton, Ontario, on 15 May 1935, it only began active flying in May 1937. Renumbered No. 119 (Bomber) Squadron on 30 November 1937, with the start of World War II, it converted to voluntary full-time service on 3 September 1939. Soon leaving Hamilton, for RCAF Western Air Command, on 4 January 1940, it moved to Jericho Bay, BC for operations from 9 Jan. 1940 to 15 July 1940.

On 21 July 1940, the squadron returned to RCAF Eastern Air Command for service at Yarmouth, Nova Scotia, and began a rotation of duty locations to Sydney, NS, deploying two plane detachments to RCAF Stn. Dartmouth, NS, and shorter RCAF Stn. Chatham, NB, and Mont-Joli, QU. Now assigned to anti-submarine duty, it flew in support of RCN/RN (and later USN activities), over the Gulf of St. Lawrence and the waters adjacent to Cabot Strait. Flying Bristol Bolingbrokes, twin-engine aircraft, its first operational mission, 16 April 1942, while at Yarmouth was to escort HMS Ramillies through the Bay of Fundy, a Revenge-class battleship assigned for North Atlantic convoy escort from Halifax, on March 17, 1941, to Saint John, New Brunswick.

119 (BR) Sqn Bolinbrokes in formation out of Yarmouth on 25 August 1941
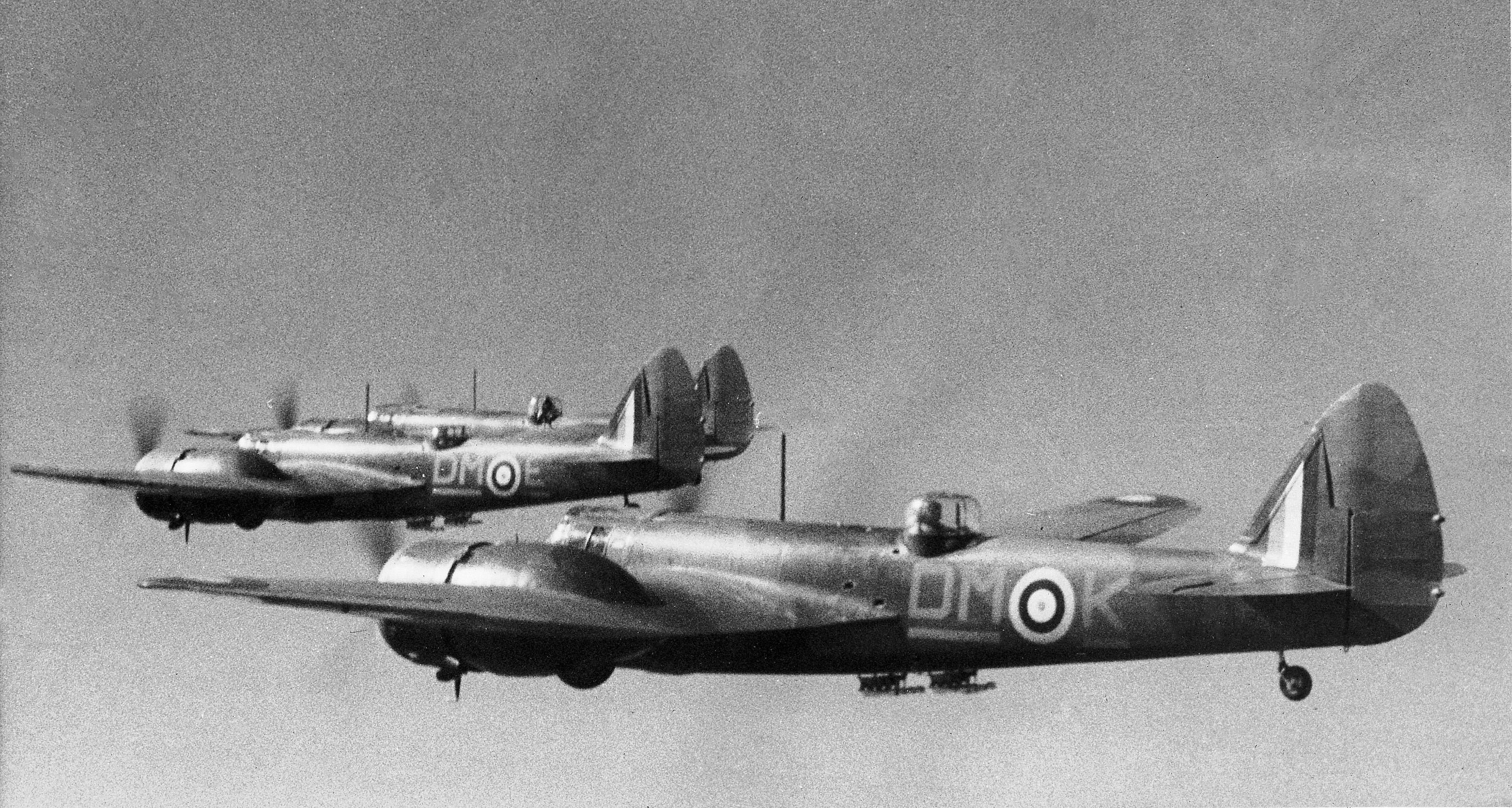

In August 1942, approval was 'sought' for an ‘Official Crest’ and the Hamilton Tigers 'Interprovincial Rugby Football Union' Club agreed to the use of their Tiger in a ‘Badge Design’ as prepared by artist J.D. Heaton-Armstrong. Submitted to the Chester of Herald of the Royal College of Arms, in London, England, the Squadron nickname became the “Hamilton Tigers” with motto – [Touch Me Not] approved by King George VI, in October 1942. In the badge, the Tiger's speed and effectiveness in action are noted as consonant with the squadron's aircraft, as with the Tiger to spring on its prey from above, symbolic of the squadron's dive-bombing actions.

| Squadron Name | Effective Date | Flying Location | Mission / Task |
|---|---|---|---|
| No. 19 (Bomber) Squadron (Auxiliary) | 15.05.1935 | Hamilton Aero Club | NPAAF Training (No Flying) |
| No. 119 (Bomber) Squadron (Auxiliary) | 15.11.1937 | Hamilton - Roxborough Park Field | Air Training Command NAAAF |
| 119 (Bomber Reconnaissance) Squadron | 03.09.1939 | Hamilton - Roxborough Park Field | HWE - Air Training Command RCAF |
| 119 (Bomber Reconnaissance) Squadron | 09.01.1940 | RCAF Stn. Vancouver, BC | WAC - Jericho Beach Airfield |
| 119 (Bomber Reconnaissance) Squadron | 21.07.1940 | RCAF Stn. Yarmouth, NS | EAC - Coastal Reconnaissance |
| 119 (Bomber Reconnaissance) Squadron | 10.01.1942 | RCAF Stn. Sydney, NS | EAC - Anti-Submarine Patrols |
| 119 (Bomber Reconnaissance) Squadron | 04.05.1943 | RCAF Stn. Moni Joli, QU | No5 Gulf Group - Submarine Hunting |
| 119 (Bomber Reconnaissance) Squadron | 02.12. 1943 | RCAF Stn. Sydney, NS | Disbanded 15.03.1944 |

Again based at Sydney, Nova Scotia, flying four aircraft Lockheed Hudson Mk. IIIs, it continued on anti-submarine reconnaissance over the Gulf of St. Lawrence and Cape Breton Island, flying its last operational mission on 11 March 1944. Disbanded at Sydney, Nova Scotia, on 15 March 1944, it had conducted four U-boat attacks on eleven sightings. On 10 March 1944, the City of Hamilton was advised their No. 119 ‘Hamilton Tigers’ Squadron was being disbanded, and flowing up the early actions of the “Hamilton Tiger Squadron Fund”, the City of Hamilton came to ‘officially adopt’ No. 424 Bomber Squadron RCAF in September 1944.

No 119 Squadron RCAF earned the Battle Honour "Atlantic 1939 - 1945" for operations with Eastern Air Command, RCAF, for operations by aircraft of RAF Coastal Command and others employed in the coastal role over the Atlantic Ocean from the outbreak of war to VE Day, this battle honour also encompasses service during the Battle of the Gulf of St. Lawrence.

== Equipment ==
- Northrop Delta (Mar - May 1940)
- Bristol Bolingbroke Mk I (Aug 40 - Aug 41), Mk IVW (Aug - Nov 41) and Mk IV (Nov 41 - Jun 42)
- Lockheed Hudson Mk III (Mar 42 - Mar 44)

== Bases ==
- RCAF Station Jericho Beach
- RCAF Station Yarmouth
- RCAF Station Sydney NS
- RCAF Station Mont-Joli QU
- RCAF Station Hamilton

== See also ==
Related lists

- List of Royal Canadian Air Force squadrons
- List of aircraft of the Canadian Air Force
- List of Royal Canadian Air Force stations
