= Gander Public Library =

Public library in Gander, Newfoundland and Labrador

- 48°57′29″N 54°36′28″W
- Location: Gander, Newfoundland and Labrador, Canada
- Established: 1937

Collection
- Size: 29563 (2012)

Access and use
- Circulation: 57245 (2012)
- Population served: 11,054

Other information
- Website: http://www.nlpl.ca/index.php/component/jumi/library.html?site_id=ggr

The Gander Public Library is a public library located in Gander, Newfoundland and Labrador, Canada. It has been part of the community since 1937, occupying five different buildings including its first and current locations. Public library services in Newfoundland and Labrador are provided by the Provincial Information & Library Resources Board (the "Provincial Board"), an independent board established by the Provincial Government through the Public Libraries Act (RSN 1990, Chapter P-40).

== History ==
The first home of the Gander Public Library was created by and for the personnel of the Royal Canadian Air Force in 1937 in one room of a multipurpose building in the RCAF Station Gander. Upon their departure after the end of World War II the forces donated the contents of the library to the remaining inhabitants. The library moved locations to follow the growth of the town away from the military base changing to a new building in both 1947 and 1952. In 1967, the library was moved again to the town hall, buying additional books in an auction from Boots UK as the firm discontinued the sale of these items in their business. The current building was established on Sept. 17, 1987. During the September 11 attacks, the library was used as a communications center after planes were diverted to the Gander International Airport, accommodating over 1,100 people through the five days the service was in use. The use of the library was also referenced in the 9/11 musical Come from Away, in the song Prayer.

== Services ==
=== Collections ===
The Gander Public Library contains approximately 30,000 books including fiction, non-fiction and reference files in both English and French. The library has almost 3,000 DVDs and over 500 CDs in its collection.

=== Technology ===
The Gander Public Library provides free wifi and public access computers with free internet. Books from other libraries can be transferred upon request. Further, there is a selection of audiobooks and E-Books available. In addition, the Library offers photocopying, scanning and colour and laser printing equipment.

== News ==
Travellers passing through Gander Airport can now dive into a free book while waiting for their flights to take off. The airport has partnered with Newfoundland and Labrador Public Libraries to unveil a small "Flybrary" — a give-a-book, take-a-book trolley inside the airport's departures area.

=== Future State Plan ===
The Department of Education and Early Childhood Development engaged Ernst & Young LLP (EY) in June 2016 to conduct an organizational review of Newfoundland and Labrador Public Library System (NLPL). The review titled, Organizational and Service Review of the Newfoundland and Labrador Public Library System was completed in May 2017, and included 18 recommendations. The 2018 Future State Plan of NLPL addresses these 18 recommendations.
