= CFB Gander =

Canadian Forces base in Newfoundland and Labrador

CFB Gander
- Gander, Newfoundland and Labrador in Canada
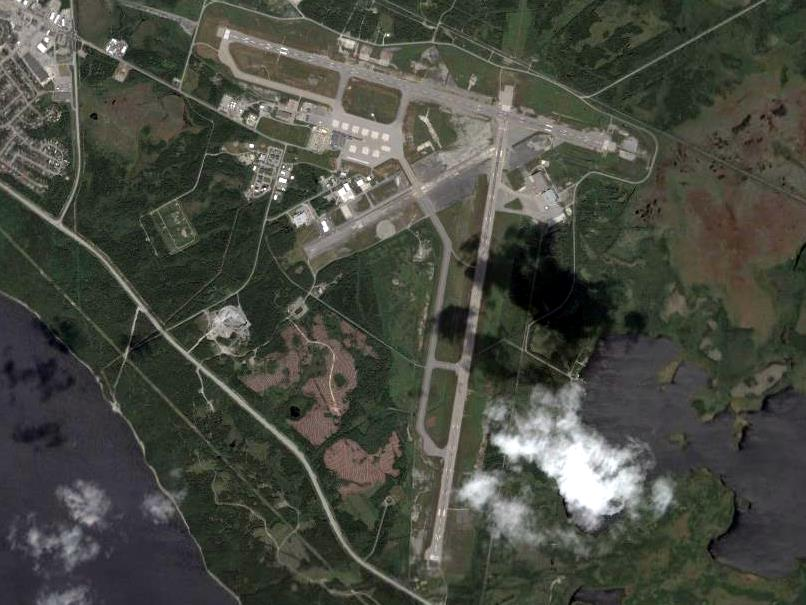

Site information
- Type: Military air base / civilian airport
- Owner: Department of National Defence
- Operator: Royal Canadian Air Force; 1941 – present
- Civilian operator: Gander Airport Corporation
- Website: http://www.rcaf-arc.forces.gc.ca/en/9-wing/index.page?

Location
- Location in Newfoundland and Labrador
- Coordinates: 48°56′13″N 054°34′05″W

Site history
- Built: 1936 – 1941
- Built by: Royal Canadian Air Force
- In use: 1936 – present
- Battles/wars: Battle of the Atlantic

Garrison information
- Current commander: Lieutenant Colonel Rhea MacLean
- Garrison: 9 Wing
- Occupants: 103 Search and Rescue Squadron; 5 Canadian Rangers; CFS Leitrim Detachment; International Ice Patrol (1982−1989); 226 Aircraft Control and Warning Squadron (1953−1990); 4th Antisubmarine Squadron (1943); 6th Antisubmarine Squadron (1943); 19th Antisubmarine Squadron (1943); No. 10 Squadron (1941−1945); No. 5 Squadron (1941−1945); No. 116 Squadron (1941−1945); No. 126 Squadron (1942−1945); No. 127 Squadron (1942−1945); No. 129 Squadron (1942−1945); 21st Reconnaissance Squadron

Airfield information
- Identifiers: IATA: YQX, ICAO: CYQX
- Elevation: 496 ft (151 m) AMSL
Runways
Direction	Length and surface
03/21	10,200 ft (3,100 m) Asphalt concrete
13/31	8,900 ft (2,700 m) Asphalt concrete
09/27	1,848 ft (563 m) Asphalt concrete
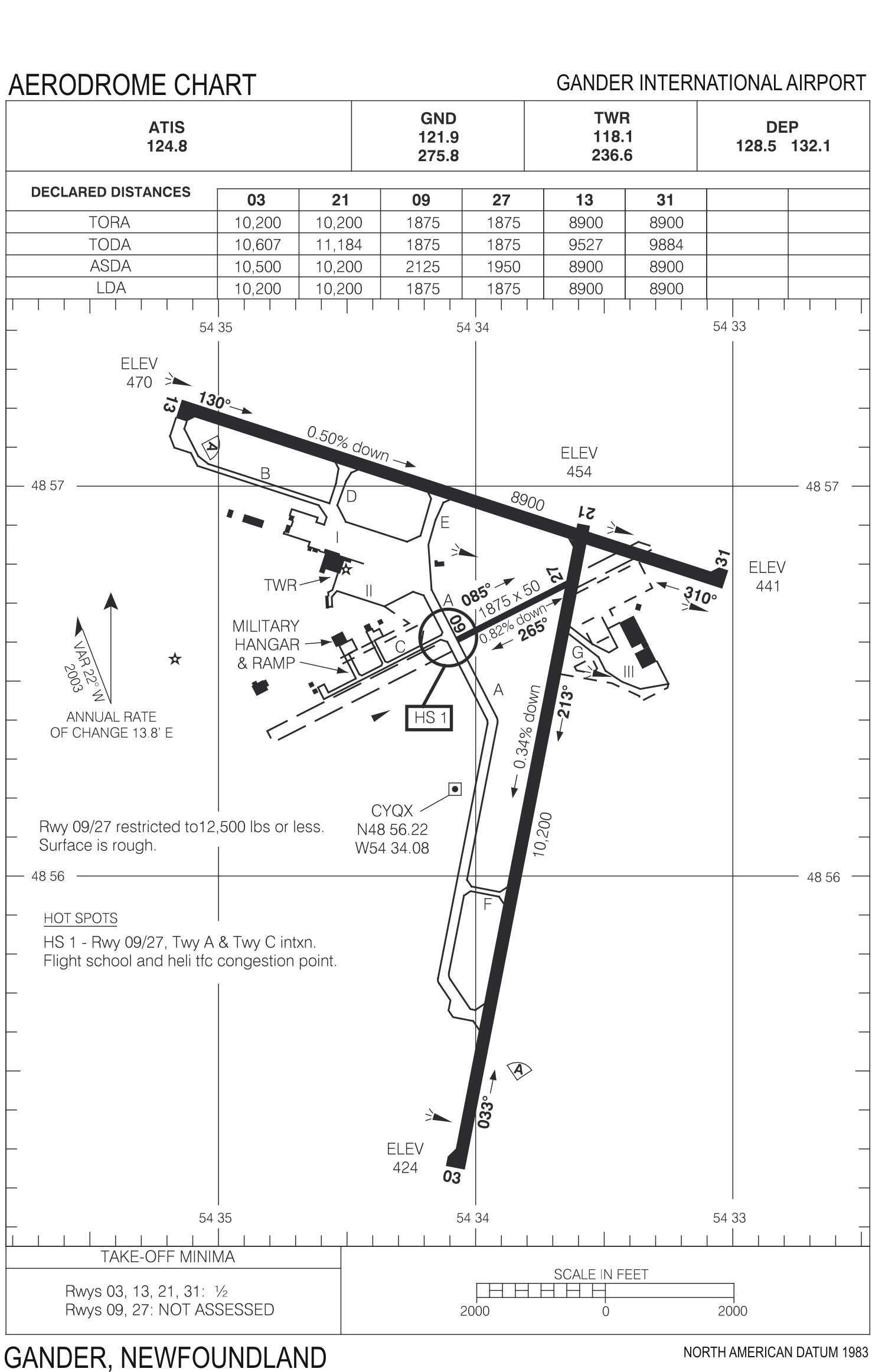
- CFB Gander Diagram

Canadian Forces Base Gander (also CFB Gander, IATA: YQX, ICAO: CYQX), is a Canadian Forces base located in Gander, Newfoundland and Labrador. It is operated as an air force base by the Royal Canadian Air Force and is home to search and rescue operations that cover a vast swath of the western North Atlantic and southern Arctic and a Canadian Coastal Radar station amongst other things. It is home to 9 Wing Gander.

CFB Gander is co-located at Gander International Airport.

== RCAF Station Gander ==
The Newfoundland Airport was established by the Dominion of Newfoundland in 1936 and it became a strategically important airfield for piston-engined aircraft in the late 1930s.

Shortly after World War II was declared, the Government of Newfoundland turned the operation of the airfield over to the Royal Canadian Air Force (RCAF) in 1940, which had been tasked by the United Kingdom the responsibility to provide aerial defense for the dominion. The No. 10 Bomber and Reconnaissance (BR) Squadron began operating from the airfield, flying Douglas Digbys and later, Liberators with responsibility to protect supply convoys in the North Atlantic from enemy U-boats.

The airfield was renamed RCAF Station Gander in 1941 and it became heavily used by Ferry Command for transporting military aircraft from Canada and the United States to the European theatre. By 1943, Gander was the largest RCAF station in the world (in terms of physical size) and the Canadian Army maintained a strong presence at the airfield, providing anti-aircraft and airfield defense.

Several units were based at RCAF Station Gander during the war. No. 10 Squadron remained until August 1945 and was reinforced at times by No. 5 Squadron and No. 116 Squadron flying Cansos for anti-submarine patrols and search and rescue. From 1942 Hurricane fighters of the Royal Air Force No. 126 Squadron, No. 127 Squadron, and No. 129 Squadron were based at RCAF Station Gander. Throughout the war the Royal Canadian Navy (RCN) maintained a communications station at RCAF Station Gander, Its main task was high-frequency direction finding (HFDF) and communications monitoring of German U-boat radio transmissions.

The United States Army Air Forces Antisubmarine Command assigned several squadrons of long-range antisubmarine aircraft (B-24 Liberator, B-18 Bolo) to fly killer-hunter flights over the Grand Banks and also provide convoy escort overflights from Newfoundland. After the fall of 1943, these missions were undertaken by the United States Navy.

The RCAF handed operation of the airfield back to the Government of Newfoundland in March 1946 and removed its presence at what was promptly renamed Gander Airport (it was later upgraded to international status), although the RCN's radio monitoring station remained in operation. The airfield was taken over by Canada's federal government under the Department of Transport in 1949 after Newfoundland became Canada's tenth province. Facilities and runways were enlarged and modified for larger aircraft.

When Newfoundland joined Confederation, the RCN formally acquired the property known as the "Old Navy Site" and Naval Radio station Gander, call sign CGV, was born. Naval Radio Station (NRS) Gander consisted of four buildings, four sailors and a few civilian personnel.

=== Aerodrome ===
In approximately 1942 the aerodrome was listed as RCAF Aerodrome - Gander, Newfoundland at 48°57′N 54°34′W with a variation of 30 degrees west and elevation of 452 ft (138 m). The field was listed as "All hard surfaced" and had four runways listed as follows:

Runway Name	Length	Width	Surface
5/23	4,500 ft (1,400 m)	600 ft (180 m)	Hard Surfaced
9/27	4,800 ft (1,500 m)	1,200 ft (370 m)	Hard Surfaced
12/30	4,700 ft (1,400 m)	600 ft (180 m)	Hard Surfaced
18/36	4,450 ft (1,360 m)	600 ft (180 m)	Hard Surfaced

=== Pinetree Line Radar site ===
In 1952, the United States Air Force constructed a General Surveillance radar station near the airfield as part of the Pinetree Line, designated "N-25". The new station was reassigned in 1953 to the Royal Canadian Air Force and took up the retired name RCAF Station Gander (designated "C-25"). The station functioned as a Ground-Control Intercept (GCI) and warning station housing the 226 Aircraft Control and Warning Squadron. As a GCI station, the squadron's role was to guide interceptor aircraft toward unidentified intruders picked up on the unit's radar scopes.

It was equipped with the following radars:

- Search Radar: AN/FPS-3C, AN/FPS-20A, AN/FPS-93A, AN/FPS-117
- Height Radar: AN/TPS-502, AN/FPS-6B, AN/FPS-26

On 1 July 1990, the site was inactivated and closed.

== Canadian Forces Station Gander ==
On February 1, 1968, the RCN, RCAF and Canadian Army were unified and reorganized into the Canadian Forces. RCAF Station Gander, operating the Pinetree Line radar station and the Naval Radio Station Gander, was renamed Canadian Forces Station Gander, or CFS Gander.

In 1970 a new expanded communications monitoring facility was constructed for Communications Command, replacing Naval Radio Station Gander in 1971. CFS Gander's Pinetree Line radar and its new communications facilities provided support to NORAD fighter-interceptors operating from CFB Chatham and CFB Bagotville with the CF-101 Voodoo.

In 1977, Gander saw its first military flying unit return to the area since the war when a detachment of 424 Squadron, flying CH-113 Labrador helicopters moved to CFS Gander to provide search and rescue (SAR) operations (this being in response to Canada declaring its 200-nautical-mile (370 km) Exclusive Economic Zone offshore, resulting in increased Canadian fishing activities). Having found a permanent home at Gander, the SAR helicopters were no longer a 424 Squadron detachment and a new unit identifier was required. Thus, in May 1977, 103 Search and Rescue Flight was reactivated at Gander. Air Command (AIRCOM) also regained control of CFS Gander from Communications Command in May 1977, although Communications Command continued to operate the radio intercept facility. 103 Squadron was housed in a separate facility constructed some distance from the civilian airfield terminal.

== Canadian Forces Base Gander ==
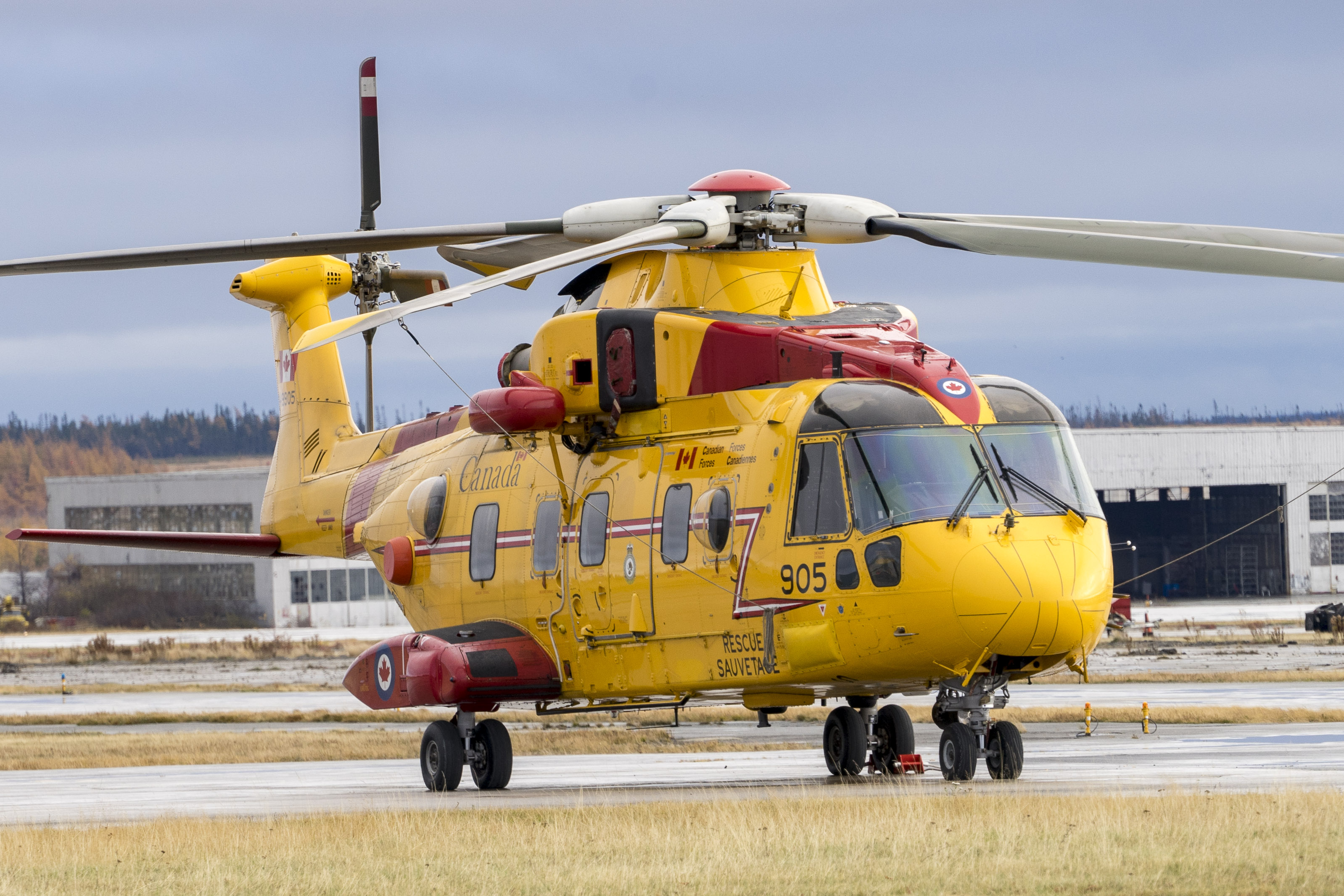
Canadian CH-149 Cormorant at CFB Gander

By 1984 CFS Gander was the largest Canadian Forces Station in the Canadian Forces. Because Gander was such a large establishment and because 103 Rescue Unit had such a high-profile with its ocean rescue mission, the station was officially upgraded to a Canadian Forces Base, becoming Canadian Forces Base Gander or CFB Gander in March 1984.

During the early 1990s the federal government began to cut back on its defence budget, resulting in numerous base closures across Canada. AIRCOM units were consolidated into wings in April 1993, which became the high-level "lodger unit" at Canadian Forces Bases which operated as air force bases. Thus while the actual base is known as CFB Gander, its primary lodger unit (or operational unit) is 9 Wing, frequently referred to as 9 Wing Gander.

Among its many roles, 9 Wing Gander is responsible for providing search and rescue services throughout Newfoundland and Labrador, northeastern Quebec, the eastern Arctic and offshore waters of these regions. Crews of 103 Search and Rescue Squadron are on 24-hour standby, ready to answer the call.

103 Squadron also offers transient aircraft servicing to visiting Canadian Forces and allied aircraft as requested.

9 Wing includes the 9 Air Reserve Augmentation Flight. It augments and support the operations, administrative and technical functions of the base. Its Airfield Engineers Flight provides trained engineer reservists from various trades to support UN and Canadian Forces deployments worldwide.

CFB Gander is also host to Leitrim Detachment which operates and maintains signals intelligence and utilizes a Wullenweber AN/FRD-10 circularly disposed antenna array for High-frequency direction finding of high-priority targets. 9 Wing Telecommunications provides all military air units at Gander with message transmission and reception services.

In addition, CFB Gander operates and maintains a Canadian Coastal AN/FPS-117 Radar on behalf of Fighter Group Canadian NORAD Region Headquarters. Also based at CFB Gander is the Headquarters of 5 Canadian Rangers Patrol Group which is part of the Army's 5th Canadian Division.

== Units ==
=== Current units ===
- 103 Search and Rescue squadron
- 9 Mission Support Squadron
- 9 Operations Support Squadron
- 9 Wing Air Reserve Flight
- 5 Canadian Ranger Patrol Group
- 29 Military Police flight
- Air Reserve Flight Detachment Torbay
- CFS Leitrim Detachment Gander

=== Former units ===
==== Royal Canadian Air Force ====
- 226 Aircraft Control and Warning Squadron
- 770 Communications Research Squadron
- No. 5 Squadron
- No. 10 Squadron
- No. 116 Squadron

==== United States Air Force ====
- 24th Tactical Missile Squadron
- 6th Tactical Missile Squadron
- 19th Antisubmarine Squadron
- 6th Antisubmarine Squadron
- 4th Antisubmarine Squadron
- International Ice Patrol

== See also ==
- Gander International Airport
