= 160 Squadron =

160 Squadron may refer to:

- 160 Squadron (Israel)
- 160 Squadron, Republic of Singapore Air Force; see list of Republic of Singapore Air Force squadrons
- No. 160 Squadron RCAF, Canada
- No. 160 Squadron RAF, United Kingdom
- 160th Aero Squadron, Air Service, United States Army
- 160th Fighter Squadron, United States Air Force
