= 145 Squadron =

145 Squadron may refer to:

- No. 145 Squadron RCAF, Canada
- No. 145 Squadron RAF, United Kingdom
- 145 Squadron, Republic of Singapore Air Force
- VA-145 (U.S. Navy)

== See also ==
- I/145 Polish Fighter Squadron
