= No. 116 Squadron RCAF =

- Active: 1938-1939, 1941-1945
- Disbanded: 20 June 1945
- Country: Canada
- Allegiance: Canada
- Branch: Royal Canadian Air Force
- Role: Bomber Reconnaissance
- Part of: RCAF Eastern Air Command
- Engagements: Second World War: Battle of the Atlantic; Battle of the St. Lawrence
- Battle honours: North-West Atlantic 1941-1945

No. 116 (Bomber Reconnaissance) Squadron was a Royal Canadian Air Force squadron that was active during the Second World War. It was originally formed as a Coast Artillery Co-operation squadron and then a fighter squadron before being disbanded in 1939, and then reformed in 1941. It was primarily used in an anti-submarine role and was based at Dartmouth and Sydney, Nova Scotia and Gander, Newfoundland. The squadron flew the Catalina and Canso before disbanding on 20 June 1945.

== See also ==
- RCAF Eastern Air Command
