= No. 147 Squadron RCAF =

- Active: 1 July 1942 - 15 March 1944
- Country: Canada
- Allegiance: Canada
- Branch: Royal Canadian Air Force
- Role: Bomber-Reconnaissance
- Part of: Western Air Command
- Battle honours: Pacific Coast, 1942-1944.

== History ==
147 Squadron RCAF was a Canadian Home War Establishment (HWE) Squadron. It was formed as part of Western Air Command (WAC) on 1 July 1942 at Sea Island, B.C. where it served as a Bomber Reconnaissance (BR) unit tasked with anti-submarine duty. 147 Squadron moved to RCAF Station Tofino, B.C. in March 1943 and, with the reduced threat of Japanese action on the Canadian Pacific coast, was disbanded 15 March 1944.

== Equipment ==
- Bristol Bolingbroke I and IV (Jul 42 - Mar 44)

Two letter Squadron code was briefly SZ from July 1942 until the use of Squadron codes was discontinued in the RCAF HWE on the 16 Oct 1942, "for security reasons".

== Bases ==
- RCAF Station Sea Island, B.C. (Jul 42 - Mar 43)
- RCAF Station Tofino, B.C. (Mar 43 - Mar 44)

== See also ==
Related lists

- List of Royal Canadian Air Force squadrons
- List of aircraft of the Canadian Air Force
- List of Royal Canadian Air Force stations
