= No. 2 Squadron RCAF =

Canadian military aviation unit of late 1930s

- Active: 1935–1936, 1936–1939
- Country: Canada
- Branch: Royal Canadian Air Force
- Role: Army Co-Operation
- Size: Seven serviceable aircraft (1938)
- Part of: Eastern Air Command (1939)
- Garrison/HQ: Saint John (September–October 1939)

Insignia
- Unit code: KO (1939)

Aircraft flown
- Armstrong Whitworth Atlas; Westland Lysander

No. 2 (Army Co-Operation) Squadron was a Royal Canadian Air Force (RCAF) squadron active during the late 1930s. The squadron operated army cooperation aircraft from 1935, and upon the outbreak of World War II was selected for overseas duty. However, a shortage of aircraft forced its disbandment in late 1939 to reinforce two other squadrons.

The lineage of the squadron originates with the first Canadian 2 Squadron, formed in 1918 as part of the Canadian Air Force and disbanded in 1920. The squadron number was carried by No. 2 (Operations) Squadron, which flew forestry patrols in Alberta to support civil government operations between 1925 and 1927. It was transferred to civilian control at the end of that period and its designation lapsed. The squadron was reformed on paper as No. 2 (Training) Squadron in 1928, but never became active under that designation.

== History ==
The squadron traced its lineage back to No. 2 Squadron, Canadian Air Force (CAF), and No. 2 (Operations) Squadron RCAF.

=== Day bombing squadron ===
The formation of two Canadian-manned squadrons in England, No. 123 (Canadian Squadron) Squadron RAF, a day bombing unit, and a fighter unit, was authorized by the Air Ministry on 5 August 1918 during World War I; these were to be the first formations of the Canadian Air Force. Canadian flying ace Temporary Lieutenant Colonel Billy Bishop was placed in charge of pilot selection for the squadrons; he prioritized officers who had seen service on the Western Front over recent volunteers, effectively creating what military historian Sydney F. Wise described as two "elite squadrons". Bishop selected Captain Walter Lawson DFC, a veteran Royal Naval Air Service and Royal Air Force (RAF) pilot, to command 2 Squadron, but the former's departure for Canada after giving up his position in early October delayed the formation of the squadrons as Bishop had completed a list of pilots for the fighter squadron but left Lawson to select the pilots of the bomber squadron; the Air Ministry did not receive a complete pilot list until 19 November. In addition to Bishop's departure, the delay in the pilot selection process occurred due to difficulties in transferring Lawson and the other squadron commander from the RAF and doubts about the continued existence of the Canadian Air Force after the war ended on 11 November. Ground crew for the Canadian Air Force were selected from men with relevant civilian careers in Canadian depots in England in a process that began in August, which resulted in them spending a lengthy period in training.

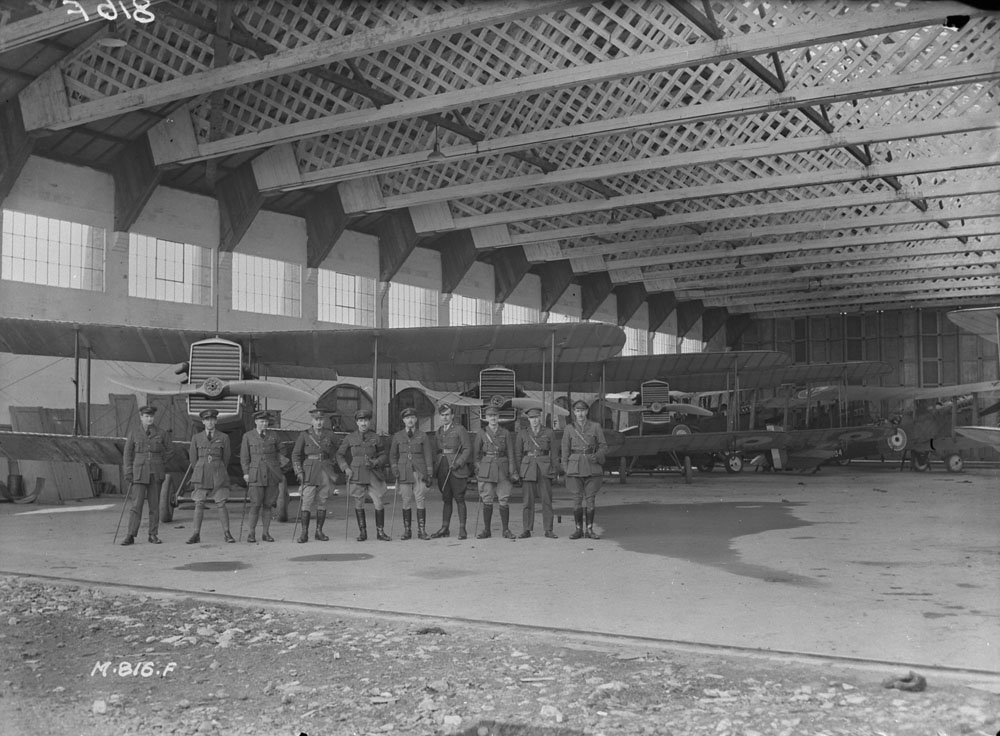
Officers of No. 2 Squadron CAF at Upper Heyford in front of their DH.9As, 1918 or 1919.

The squadron was officially formed as No. 2 Squadron, CAF on 20 November at Upper Heyford following approval for the formation of the two squadrons from Canadian Prime Minister Robert Borden, who received a guarantee from the Air Ministry that the squadrons would remain intact units. Its formation was actually delayed by five days to allow an RAF squadron to leave the quarters it was assigned to. No. 2 Squadron conducted training flights during its existence. Equipped with the de Havilland DH.9A, the squadron was assigned to No. 2 Group RAF of RAF Home Command. Due to his belief that the DH.9A was obsolete, Lawson unsuccessfully requested that the squadron receive Bristol F.2B Fighters instead. In mid-January 1919, the squadron established the Hounslow Detached Flight in order to transport senior officials between London and Paris for the Paris Peace Conference.

No. 2 Squadron also operated two Fokker D.VII fighters from May 1919 to January 1920, one of which crashed with the loss of its pilot on 22 May, the squadron's sole fatal accident. Later commanders were Captains J.O. Leach MC AFC from 29 May 1919, J.A. Glen DSC and Bar from 20 August, and W.I. Bailey from 20 November of that year. When the squadron moved to RAF Shoreham on 1 April 1919, it came under the control of the new No. 1 Wing, CAF, which had been set up to provide a Canadian administrative organization for the two squadrons. No. 2 Squadron, CAF was disbanded on 5 February 1920 along with the wing headquarters after the Canadian government decided against forming a permanent peacetime air force.

=== Civil Government Air Operations squadron ===
RCAF Station High River was redesignated No. 2 (Operations) Squadron in July 1925, retroactive to 1 April under the control of RCAF headquarters, one of five squadrons authorized to carry out missions in support of government agencies. Commanded by Squadron Leader A.A.L. Cuffe, it flew forestry patrols over Alberta to support civil government with sub-bases at Pincher Creek and Eckville. Flight Lieutenant R. Collis replaced Cuffe on 19 October 1926, and would lead the squadron for the rest of its military career. Equipped with the de Havilland DH.4, Avro 552A, and Avro 504N, it tested two Armstrong Whitworth Siskins between 22 June and 14 July 1927. Of the latter, one crashed on 28 June with the loss of its pilot and the other was returned to Camp Borden. Due to opposition to the RCAF performing civil operations, the squadron was transferred to the nominally civilian Directorate of Civil Government Air Operations as the High River Air Station on 1 July 1927 and its service designation lapsed.

The squadron number was immediately repurposed for No. 2 (Training) Squadron. Authorized at Camp Borden on 1 April 1927 and redesignated the following year as an advanced training squadron, the unit only existed on paper due to a lack of aircraft, funding, and personnel. It was deleted from authorized establishments for 1929.

=== Army co-operation squadron ===
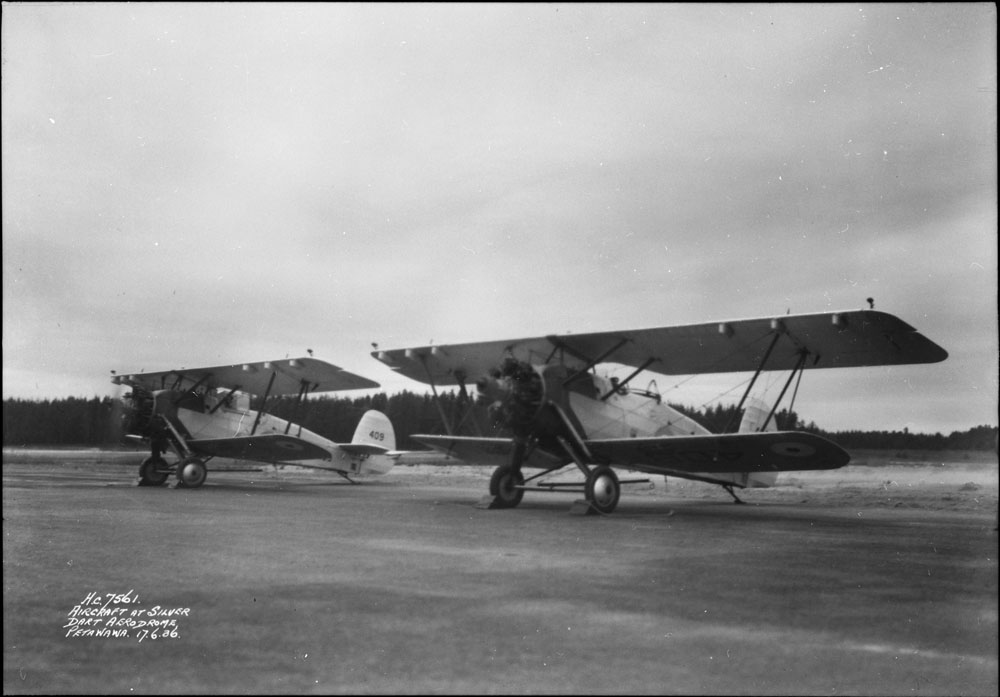
Atlases of the squadron at the June 1936 opening of the Silver Dart Aerodrome at Petawawa, Ontario

As a result of increased tensions in Europe and the development of long range bomber aircraft, the Royal Canadian Air Force expanded during the mid-1930s to provide air defense for Canada. No. 2 (Army Co-operation) Squadron was formed on 1 April 1935 at Trenton, Ontario, equipped with Armstrong Whitworth Atlas Mark I biplanes, under the control of RCAF headquarters. Along with Nos. 3 and 6 Squadrons, It was authorized to be formed with two flights for purely military purposes during Fiscal Year 1936/1937. Under the command of Flight Lieutenant W.D. Van Vliet, it drew on a cadre from the Atlas-equipped Army Co-Operation Flight, which had been formed on 1 April 1930 at Camp Borden and relocated to Trenton, the RCAF training base, in September 1931. Due to a shortage of aircraft and personnel, the squadron included only one flight on 15 April 1936. Flight Lieutenant F.G. Wait replaced Van Vliet on 2 July, and it expanded to two flights on 13 July. On 10 August it was combined into a four-flight composite squadron under the command of No. 3 Squadron commander Squadron Leader A.H. Hull with No. 3 Squadron due to the shortages, with A and B Flights from No. 2.

When it was reactivated on 1 December, the squadron was under the command of Squadron Leader T.A. Lawrence until 4 February 1937. It relocated to Rockcliffe on 17 June of that year, and Squadron Leader G.L. Howsam MC took command on 9 August. During 1937, the squadron was the most active RCAF unit, conducting army co-operation training with militia units by sending detachments to the camps of the latter, and carrying out gunnery and bombing practice. This activity level continued through 1938, with the squadron conducting service training during the fall, winter, and spring months, though dogged by the obsolescence of Atlases and a shortage of personnel. It fielded seven serviceable aircraft for most of that year, during which Lawrence resumed command on 1 April. In the summer months the squadron sent detachments to Shilo, Petawawa, and St. Catharines. supporting concentrated militia training at Camp Borden in August along with No. 3 Squadron. Two aircraft crashed during this period, one of which was written off. During the Munich Crisis in September of that year, the squadron was sent to Halifax with its Atlases to provide artillery observation as there was not yet a coast artillery co-operation squadron in the region. It remained there through October to practice coast artillery co-operation with local militia units.

After returning to Rockcliffe, the squadron commenced individual ground and air training, emphasizing forced landings, message delivery, camera gunnery, night flying, signals, photography, and mechanics. It also sent detachments to the School of Army Co-Operation for demonstration flights. Van Vliet, now a squadron leader, took command on 1 December; he would command No. 2 Squadron for the rest of its existence. It focused on two- and three-aircraft formation flying as well as night flying during January and February 1939. Although training continued during the spring, Van Vliet deplored that it was hampered by personnel shortages and daily drill parades being conducted in preparation for the upcoming visit of King George VI. The squadron returned to Trenton on 21 March 1939, absorbing the School of Army Co-Operation there and thus acquiring training responsibilities in addition to its operational mission. It helped non-permanent squadrons during their summer camps and sent a detachment to Petawawa for artillery observation practice and tactical and photography missions with army units in July.

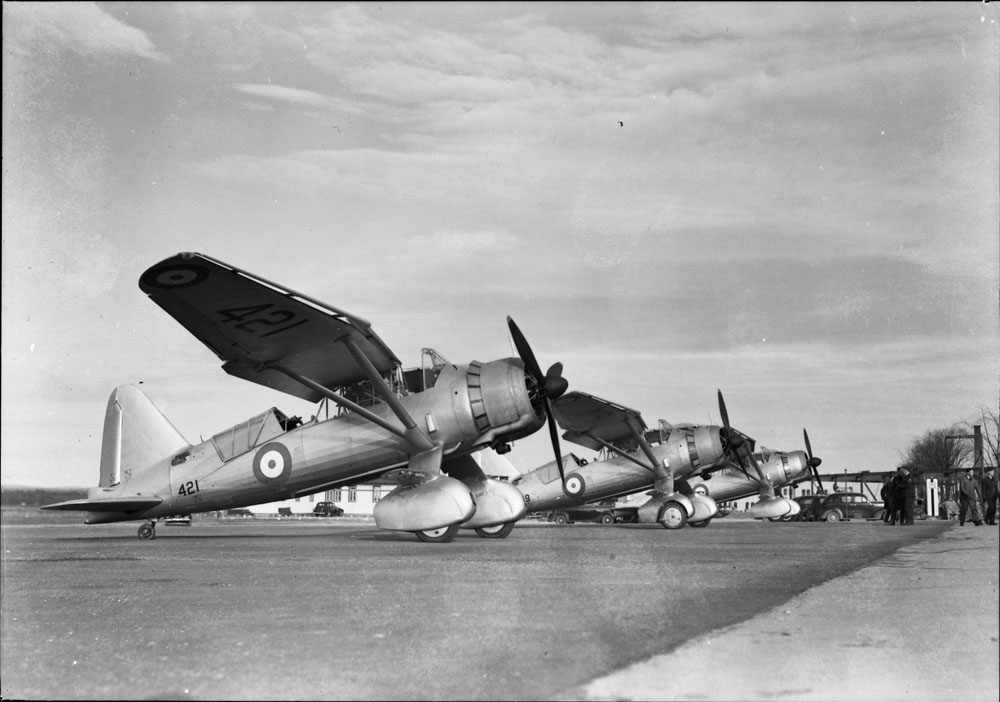
Lysanders of the squadron at Rockcliffe, November 1939

Shortly before World War II began, on 26 August, the squadron was alerted for hostilities, relocating to the civil aerodrome at Halifax, Nova Scotia, where it joined Eastern Air Command. Leaving behind A Flight at Halifax, the squadron again moved to RCAF Station Saint John on 1 September. Between 7 September and 30 October it flew reconnaissance patrols over the Bay of Fundy from both Halifax and Saint John, which amounted to 74 sorties. It was mobilized there on 10 September, and without A Flight fielded eight pilots (officers) and 90 airmen in the second half of October. After being selected for the Canadian Active Service Force, destined for overseas operations, No. 2 Squadron returned to Rockliffe to receive training and re-equip with the newer Westland Lysander Mark II monoplane on 1 November. The squadron turned over its Atlases to the replacement No. 118 Squadron and sent some of its personnel to reinforce the latter. Due to a shortage of aircraft, the squadron was disbanded on 16 December to bring Nos. 110 and 112 Squadrons, slated for transfer to England, up to full strength. Its pilots flew 168 operational and 212 non-operational flying hours during wartime; the squadron received no battle honours.

A subsequent No. 2 (Fighter) Squadron of 1940 to 1941 that later became No. 402 Squadron is not lineally connected to the No. 2 Squadron of 1935 to 1939.

== Lineage ==
- Authorized as No. 2 Squadron, CAF on 20 November 1918

Disbanded on 5 February 1920

- Reformed as No. 2 (Operations) Squadron on 1 April 1925

Redesignated No. 2 Squadron (Training) on 1 April 1927
Disbanded on 1 July 1927

- Reformed on 1 April 1928

Redesignated No. 2 (Army Co-Operation) Squadron on 1 November 1935
Disbanded on 16 December 1939.

=== Assignments ===
- No. 2 Group RAF, 15 November 1918
- No. 1 Group RAF, No. 1 Wing CAF, 1 April 1919 – 5 February 1920
- RCAF Headquarters, 1 April 1925 – 1 July 1927
- RCAF Headquarters, 1 April 1928
- Eastern Air Command, 27 August 1939
- Air Force Headquarters, Canadian Active Service Force, 1 November 1939

=== Stations ===
- Upper Heyford, Oxfordshire, 15 November 1918
- Shoreham, Sussex, 1 April 1919 – 5 February 1920
- High River, Alberta, 1 April 1925 – 1 July 1927
- Trenton, Ontario, 1 April 1935
- Rockcliffe, Ontario, 17 June 1937
- Trenton, Ontario, 21 March 1939
- Halifax, Nova Scotia, 27 August 1939
- Saint John, New Brunswick, 1 September 1939
- Rockcliffe, Ontario, 1 November – 16 December 1939

=== Aircraft ===
- de Havilland DH.9A, 1918–1920
- de Havilland DH.4, 1925–1927
- Avro 552A, 1926–1927
- Avro 504N, 1927
- Armstrong Whitworth Atlas Mark I, 1935–1939
- Westland Lysander Mark II, 1939
