= No. 117 Squadron RCAF =

- Active: 1938-1943
- Disbanded: 15 December 1943
- Country: Canada
- Allegiance: Canada
- Branch: Royal Canadian Air Force
- Role: Bomber Reconnaissance
- Part of: RCAF Eastern Air Command
- Engagements: Second World War: Battle of the Atlantic; Battle of the St. Lawrence
- Battle honours: North-West Atlantic 1941-1943

No. 117 (Bomber Reconnaissance) Squadron was a Royal Canadian Air Force squadron that was active during the Second World War. It was originally formed as a fighter squadron and then a Coast Artillery Co-operation squadron before being disbanded in 1939, and then reformed in its final role in 1941, disbanded later that year, reformed in 1942 and then disbanded permanently in 1943. It was primarily based at Sydney, Nova Scotia and used in an anti-submarine role.

== See also ==
- RCAF Eastern Air Command
