= No. 1 General Reconnaissance School RCAF =

- Country: Canada
- Branch: Royal Canadian Air Force
- Role: General Reconnaissance (Ocean Patrol) Training
- Part of: RCAF Eastern Air Command; No. 3 Training Command

No. 1 General Reconnaissance School RCAF was a flight training unit in 3 Training Command, of the Royal Canadian Air Force, flying Avro Ansons from RCAF Station Summerside, PEI.

RCAF Eastern Air Command was the part of the Royal Canadian Air Force's Home War Establishment responsible for air operations on the Atlantic coast of Canada during the Second World War, including BCATP flight schools. Many of its assigned training schools conducted advanced flying courses including Service Flying Training (SFTS), Air Observer (AOS), Bombing and Gunnery (BGS), General Reconnaissance (ocean patrol) (GRS), Naval Aerial Gunnery (NAGS), Air Navigation (ANS) and Operational (OTU) training throughout the war. Together with some advanced aircraft types these units mainly flew older bomber and patrol aircraft that had been removed from active service.

These schools were not part of the Order of Battle of RCAF Eastern Air Command. However, 3 Training Command aircraft were very active over the entire Eastern Command Area of Operations. They made an important contribution to the surveillance of the region as a force multiplier, providing extra eyes and ears. During the emergency known as the Battle of the St. Lawrence their role was very important and some units undertook combat patrols.

== See also ==
- List of Royal Air Force schools
- British Commonwealth Air Training Plan
- RCAF Eastern Air Command
- List of British Commonwealth Air Training Plan facilities in Canada
