= RCAF Station Saint John =

Former military airfield in New Brunswick, Canada

- Near Saint John, New Brunswick in Canada

Site information
- Owner: Dept of National Defence (Canada)

Location
- Location within New Brunswick
- Coordinates: 45°18′N 66°06′W

Airfield information
- Elevation: 94 feet (29 m) AMSL
Runways
Direction	Length and surface
5/23	1,825 feet (556 m) Gravel
16/34	2,100 feet (640 m) Asphalt

RCAF Station Saint John or RCAF Aerodrome Saint John, was a military aerodrome that was established at the Saint John Municipal Airport in 1939. The airport was located in the neighborhood of Millidgeville in the city of Saint John, New Brunswick.

== History ==
=== 1930-1939 ===
The Saint John Municipal Airport was established on this site in 1928–1929.

=== World War II ===
In 1939 the RCAF took over operation of the Saint John Municipal Airport. The air force constructed a hangar and other buildings at the site. From 1939 until 1940 a flight from No. 2 (Army Cooperation) Squadron was stationed at RCAF Station Saint John. They were replaced by No. 118 (Coastal Artillery Co-operation) Squadron who remained at the station until April 1944 when they were transferred to RCAF Station Dartmouth.

=== Post war ===
The majority of RCAF Station Saint John closed in early 1944. A six-member detachment remained at the station until the airport was turned back to the City of Saint John in May 1947 and the city operated the municipal airport at the site until December 1951, when the aerodrome was decommissioned and flying operations were relocated to the new Saint John Airport.

==== Aerodrome information ====
In approximately 1942 the aerodrome was listed at 45°18′N 66°06′W with a Var. 22 degrees 30' W and elevation of 94 feet (29 m). Two runways were listed as follows:

Runway Name	Length	Width	Surface
5/23	1,825 feet (556 m)	150 feet (46 m)	Gravel
16/34	2,100 feet (640 m)	150 feet (46 m)	Asphalt

== Location ==
The former Municipal Airport and RCAF Station occupied an area that is bounded by the modern day roads: Millidge Avenue, Daniel Avenue, Marlin Drive, Woodward Avenue and Boars Head Road. The main runway followed the same course and distance as present day Donaldson Street.

== Commemoration ==
A plaque commemorating the Saint John Municipal Airport was unveiled in 2009 on the grounds of M. Gerald Teed Memorial School. In 2012 the Wade-Myles Aviation Park was established next to the school.

The M. Gerald Teed school was designed by Saint John architect Jack Myles. Flight Lieutenant Myles, DFC, was a photo reconnaissance pilot during the Second World War.
