= No. 11 Squadron RCAF =

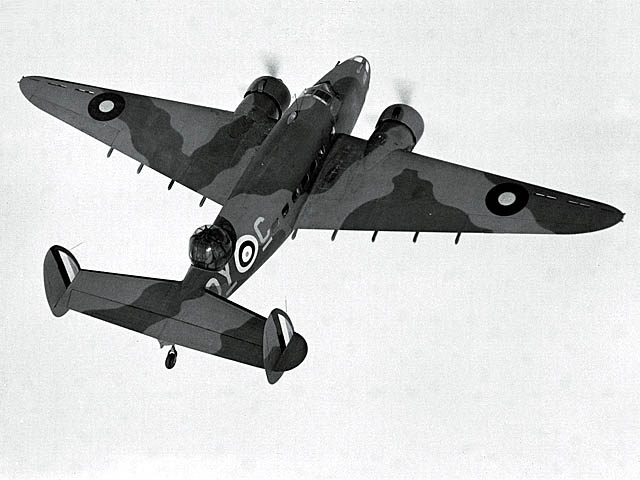
- No. 11 Squadron Lockheed Hudson
- Active: 3 Nov 1939 - 15 Sept 1945
- Country: Canada
- Branch: Royal Canadian Air Force
- Role: Bomber Reconnaissance
- Part of: RCAF No.3 Training Command, Eastern Air Command, Western Air Command
- Nickname(s): The Joe Squadron
- Engagements: Second World War: Battle of the Atlantic; Battle of the St. Lawrence
- Decorations: 8 DFC's, 1 AFC, 1 DFM and 6 MiDs
- Battle honours: North-West Atlantic 1939-1945; Pacific Coast 1945
- Flying hours: 25,386 operational, 13,377 non-operational

Insignia
- Unit Codes: OY (1939-1942); KL (1942)

Aircraft flown
- Patrol: Lockheed Hudson I & III; Consolidated Liberator III, V & VI

No. 11 Squadron RCAF was a Royal Canadian Air Force squadron active during the Second World War. It was primarily used in an anti-submarine role and was based on the east coast of Canada and Newfoundland. It was initially formed at RCAF Station Ottawa before moving to Dartmouth, Nova Scotia on 3 November 1939, where it became operational.

From 26 October 1943 to 17 June 1944, it operated from Torbay, Newfoundland before returning to Halifax for a year, before again moving across the country to Patricia Bay, British Columbia on 31 May 1945. The squadron flew the Lockheed Hudson and Consolidated Liberator maritime patrol bombers before disbanding on 15 September. The unit's first operational flight, on 10 November 1939, was to provide sighting practice for the anti-aircraft guns of the Royal Navy battlecruiser HMS Repulse and aircraft carrier HMS Furious, as well as for the Halifax, Nova Scotia shore batteries.
