= Yarmouth Airport =

Aerodrome in Yarmouth, Nova Scotia

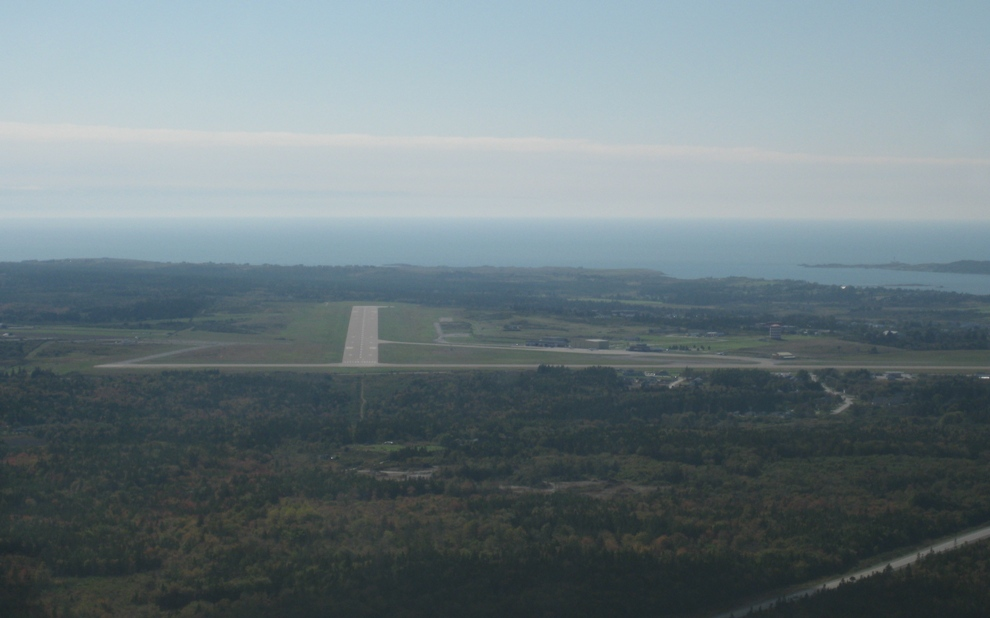
- Final approach, runway 24
- IATA: YQI; ICAO: CYQI; WMO: 71603

Summary
- Airport type: Public
- Owner/Operator: Yarmouth Airport Commission
- Location: Yarmouth County, Nova Scotia
- Time zone: AST (UTC−04:00)
  - Summer (DST): ADT (UTC−03:00)
- Elevation AMSL: 140 ft / 43 m
- Coordinates: 43°49′38″N 066°05′18″W
- Website: yarmouthairport.ca

Map
- Location in Nova Scotia CYQI (Canada)

Runways
Direction	Length		Surface
Direction	ft	m	Surface
06/24	6,002	1,829	Asphalt
15/33	4,999	1,524	Asphalt
- Sources: Canada Flight Supplement; Airport Divestiture Status Report; Environment Canada

Yarmouth Airport (IATA: YQI, ICAO: CYQI) is a registered aerodrome located in Yarmouth County, Nova Scotia, Canada. It began as a World War II Royal Air Force training base.

The airport is classified as an airport of entry by Nav Canada and is staffed by the Canada Border Services Agency (CBSA). CBSA officers at this airport can handle aircraft with no more than 110 passengers or 225 if offloaded in stages.

== History ==
=== Second World War ===
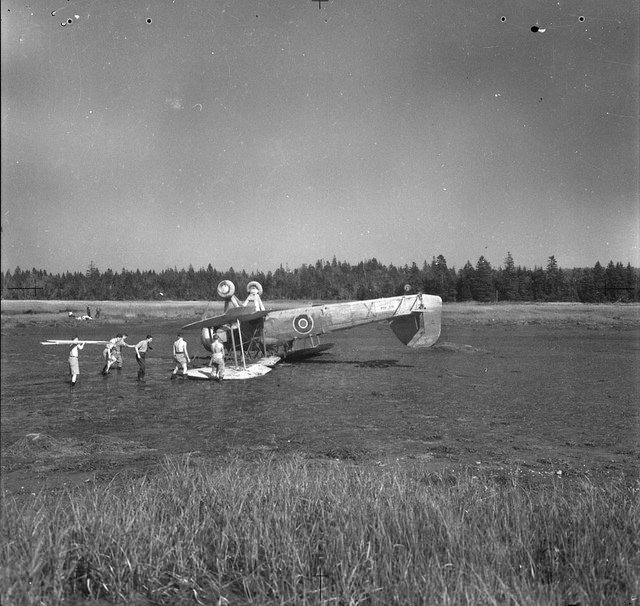
Wreck of Fairey Swordfish at No.1 NAGS, 1943

In 1936, the Department of National Defence selected the site as a base for Maritime patrol aircraft. The airport land was owned by Frederick Eyre and it was taken by the government against his will to build the airport. The airbase had two parts, East Camp and West Camp. The West Camp was home to the Royal Canadian Air Force while the East Camp was part of the British Commonwealth Air Training Plan. At East Camp, the Royal Air Force's No. 34 Operational Training Unit (OTU) was located at Yarmouth from April 1942 to June 1942, when it was relocated to RCAF Station Pennfield Ridge, New Brunswick. In November 1942 the Royal Navy established the No. 1 Naval Air Gunnery School (NAGS), flying the Fairey Swordfish. No. 1 NAGS ceased operations in March 1945.

In addition to the Naval Air Gunnery School, several individual squadrons and units called RCAF Yarmouth home at various times during the war, including:

- No. 5 Squadron RCAF, from August 1944 to May 1945, flying the Consolidated Catalina Mk. 1;
- No. 113 Squadron RCAF, from February 1942 to May 1943, flying the Lockheed Hudson. A 113 Squadron Hudson flying from Yarmouth sank U-754 on 31 July 1942, Eastern Air Command's first kill;
- No. 119 Squadron RCAF, from July 1940 to January 1942, flying the Bristol Bolingbroke;
- No. 160 Squadron RCAF, from July 1943 to August 1944, flying the Consolidated Canso;
- No. 161 Squadron RCAF, from November 1944 to May 1945, flying the Consolidated Canso;
- No. 162 Squadron RCAF, from May 1942 (formation) to September 1943, flying the Consolidated Canso; and
- No. 6 (Canadian Artillery Corps) Detachment, from December 1941 to November 1943, flying the Westland Lysander in a coast artillery cooperation role.

In addition, No. 419 Squadron RCAF and No. 428 Squadron RCAF were disbanded in Yarmouth in September 1945 after the Surrender of Japan. Both squadrons, flying the Avro Lancaster, were to be trained and re-equipped for the Commonwealth Tiger Force in the Pacific Theatre.

==== Aerodrome information ====
In approximately 1942 the aerodrome was listed at 43°50′N 66°05′W with a Var. 20 degrees W and elevation of 133 ft (41 m). Three runways were listed as follows:

Runway name	Length	Width	Surface
2/20	5,000 ft (1,500 m)	150 ft (46 m)	Hard surfaced
7/25	5,000 ft (1,500 m)	150 ft (46 m)	Hard surfaced
16/34	5,000 ft (1,500 m)	150 ft (46 m)	Hard surfaced

=== Postwar ===
After the war, the airfield switched to public/commercial use when it was transferred to Transport Canada. Regularly scheduled service was started by Trans-Canada Air Lines (TCA) which in 1947 was operating daily round trip Halifax - Yarmouth - Saint John - Boston service. By 1962, TCA was continuing to operate daily flights from the airport with nonstop service to Boston as well as direct flights to Halifax via a stop in Saint John both flown with Vickers Viscount turboprop airliners. Trans-Canada then became Air Canada in 1965.

Ownership of Yarmouth Airport was transferred from Transport Canada to the Yarmouth Airport Commission Association on October 1, 1997. Air Canada flights into Yarmouth ceased in January 2003. Since then, several small operators have provided air service between Halifax and Yarmouth at various times. These include Sou'West Air, who covered the route in 2003, and Starlink Airlines, which flew between Halifax, Yarmouth and Portland, Maine in 2009. The latter lasted less than one year, despite a $2 million provincial government subsidy meant to carry the airline through the first few years of startup. From March 15, 2010 to December 31, 2012, an American company, Twin Cities Air Service, provided service between Yarmouth and Portland with scheduled flights several times a week. The airport has no scheduled passenger air service at the present time.

=== Past scheduled Air Canada service ===
In 1975, Air Canada was operating daily flights with McDonnell Douglas DC-9-30 jetliners on a roundtrip routing of Halifax, NS - Saint John, NB - Yarmouth, NS - Boston. Ten years later in 1985, Air Canada was still operating daily DC-9-30 jet service nonstop to Boston as well as direct to Halifax via a stop in Saint John with passengers bound for Toronto, Montreal and Ottawa having to change planes in Halifax according to the Air Canada timetable at the time.

Air Canada then subsequently ceased mainline DC-9-30 jet flights into the airport with this service being replaced by Air Nova operating code sharing flights with regional turboprop aircraft on behalf of Air Canada. According to the Official Airline Guide (OAG), in 1989 Air Nova was operating nonstop flights twice daily to both Boston and Halifax with de Havilland Canada DHC-8 Dash 8 aircraft. Ten years later in 1999, the OAG lists only one daily nonstop Dash 8 flight to Halifax operated by Air Nova on behalf of Air Canada with no service being flown to Boston at this time.

== Facilities ==
Yarmouth Airport facilities include a modern airport terminal building and combined services building which houses a maintenance garage, as well as a 930 m^{2} (10,000 ft^{2}) hangar. The airport has two runways, 06/24 and 15/33. (06/24 6,000 ft × 50 ft [1,829 m × 15 m]), two taxiways and separate parking aprons for commercial and general aviation. In the summer of 2013 its Category I instrument landing system (ILS) was decommissioned, however it does have an RNAV approaches and the NDB. The airport property has 3.16 km^{2} (1.22 sq mi) of easily accessible, industrial real estate.

The Yarmouth Airport is home to the Tri-County Flying Association (informally known as the Yarmouth Flying Club). This non-profit flying club has a small clubhouse located on the field and operates a Cessna 172 available for rental by its members.

== Incidents ==
On November 11, 1971, an Iberia Airlines Boeing 747 jumbo jet en route from Madrid to New York City made an emergency landing at the airport due to a bomb threat. It was the first time a 747 had ever attempted an emergency landing at such a small airport. Even though the jet successfully landed, the runway was too short for the 747 to take off with passengers on board. The passengers were then flown to New York on board three Air Canada DC-9 jets, and early the next morning the 747 took off for New York. No bomb was ever found and the 241 passengers and 18 crew were unharmed.

== See also ==
- Doctor's Lake East Water Aerodrome
- Doctor's Lake West Water Aerodrome
- Yarmouth (Regional Hospital) Heliport
