= No. 164 Squadron RCAF =

164 Squadron
Squadron badge
Information
Role
Aircraft flown
Wing
Base
Motto
Call Sign
History
Date founded
Badge
Notable Battle Honours
Previous Designation

No. 164 Squadron was a transportation squadron of the Royal Canadian Air Force that formed at Moncton, New Brunswick in January 1943. It was the primary source of crews and aircraft for airlift within Canada.

Squadron detachments operated out of Dartmouth, Nova Scotia, Rivers, Manitoba, Edmonton, Alberta and Winnipeg, Manitoba. An unofficial jacket patch manufactured by Crest Craft of Saskatoon was available to Squadron members during the war.

Following World War II the squadron was split up with the detachment at Dartmouth becoming No. 426 Squadron RCAF and the detachment at Edmonton becoming No. 435 Squadron RCAF. Both squadrons still operate as transport squadrons with the Canadian Forces

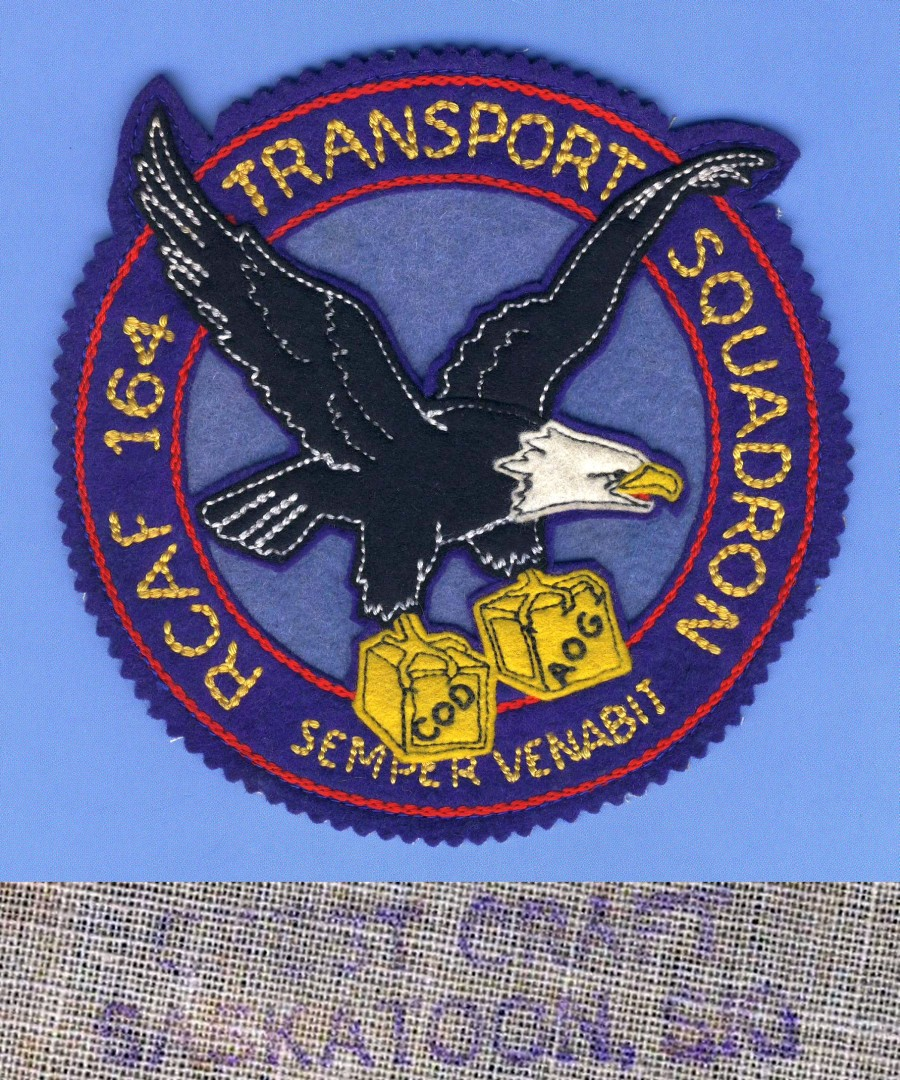
RCAF 164 Transport Squadron, World War II era.
