= No. 145 Squadron RCAF =

- Active: 1942–1945
- Disbanded: 30 June 1945
- Country: Canada
- Branch: Royal Canadian Air Force
- Role: Bomber Reconnaissance
- Part of: RCAF Eastern Air Command
- Nickname(s): FUROR NON SINE FRENIS (Fury with balance)
- Engagements: Second World War: Battle of the Atlantic; Battle of the St. Lawrence
- Battle honours: North-West Atlantic 1942-1945

No. 145 (Bomber Reconnaissance) Squadron was a Royal Canadian Air Force squadron that was active during the Second World War. It was primarily used in an anti-submarine role and was based on the east coast of Canada and Newfoundland. The squadron flew the Lockheed Hudson and Lockheed Ventura before disbanding on 30 June 1945.
