= No. 10 Squadron RCAF =

- Active: 5 September 1939 – 15 August 1945
- Disbanded: 15 August 1945
- Country: Canada
- Branch: Royal Canadian Air Force
- Role: Bomber Reconnaissance
- Part of: Eastern Air Command
- Nickname(s): North Atlantic Squadron
- Engagements: Second World War: Battle of the Atlantic; Battle of the St. Lawrence
- Battle honours: North-West Atlantic 1940–1945

Insignia
- Squadron Codes: PB (Aug 1939 - May 1942), JK (May - Oct 1942)

Aircraft flown
- Bomber: Westland Wapiti Mk.IIA; Douglas Digby; Consolidated Liberator III, V & VI

No. 10 (Army Cooperation) Squadron RCAF was formed on 5 October 1932 and renumbered as No. 110 Squadron on 15 November 1937, and then as No. 400 Squadron on 1 March 1941, as the first of the Article XV squadrons, manned and led by Canadians, but equipped with aircraft provided by the British. No. 10 (Bomber) Squadron RCAF was a new, unrelated unit that was formed by the Royal Canadian Air Force on 5 September 1939 for anti-submarine warfare using the same, now disused squadron number, and was active for the duration of the Second World War.

While based on the east coast of Canada and Newfoundland it established an RCAF record for 22 attacks on U-boats and successfully sank 3, garnering the unofficial nickname of North Atlantic Squadron. The squadron flew the Westland Wapiti, Douglas Digby, and Consolidated Liberator.

== Victories ==
- 30 October 1942 – U-520
- 19 September 1943 – U-341
- 26 October 1943 – U-420
