= Mont-Joli Airport =

Airport in Mont-Joli, Quebec, Canada

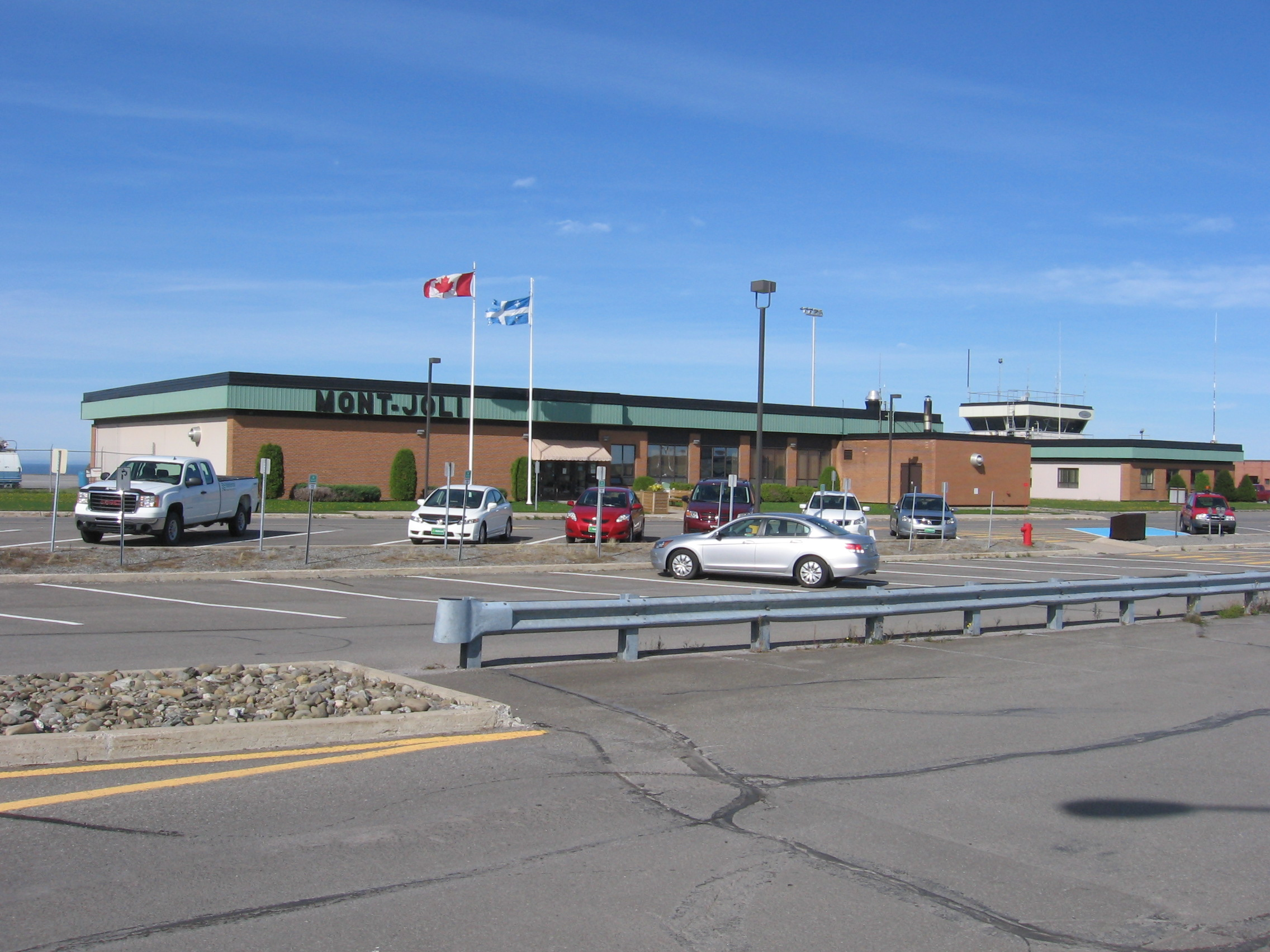
- IATA: YYY; ICAO: CYYY; WMO: 71718

Summary
- Airport type: Public
- Operator: Régie Intermunicipale
- Location: Mont-Joli, Quebec
- Time zone: EST (UTC−05:00)
  - Summer (DST): EDT (UTC−04:00)
- Elevation AMSL: 172 ft (52 m)
- Coordinates: 48°36′32″N 068°12′29″W
- Website: aeroportmontjoli.com

Map
- Location in Quebec CYYY (Canada)

Runways
Direction	Length		Surface
Direction	ft	m	Surface
06/24	6,000	1,829	Asphalt
15/33	3,954	1,205	Asphalt

Statistics (2010)
- Aircraft movements: 5,798
- Sources: Canada Flight Supplement; Environment Canada; Movements from Statistics Canada

Mont-Joli Airport (IATA: YYY, ICAO: CYYY) is located 1.5 nautical miles (2.8 km; 1.7 mi) north northwest of Mont-Joli, Quebec, Canada. It is the only airport with scheduled service in the Bas-Saint-Laurent region.

== History ==
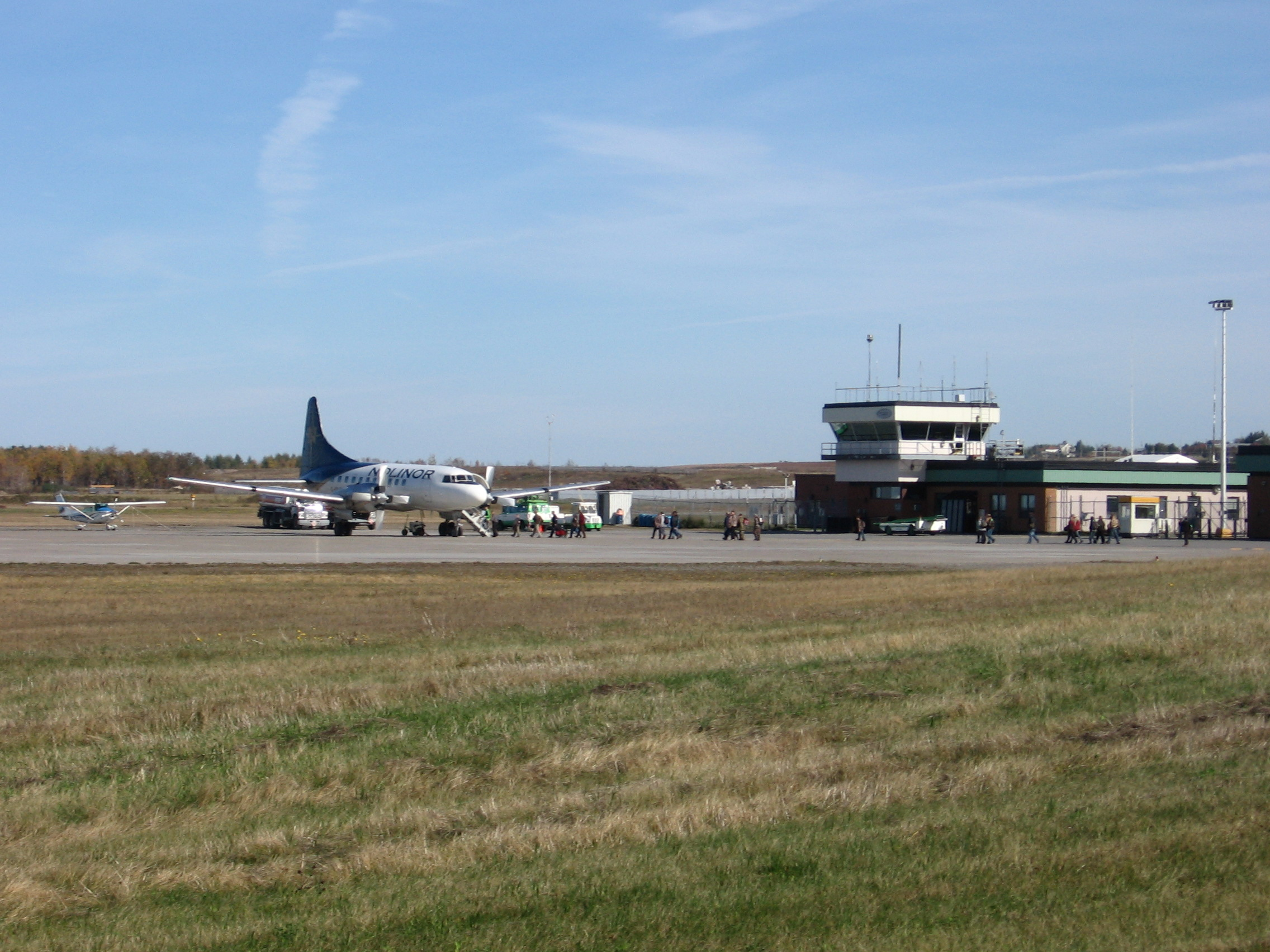
Apron, terminal, and control tower

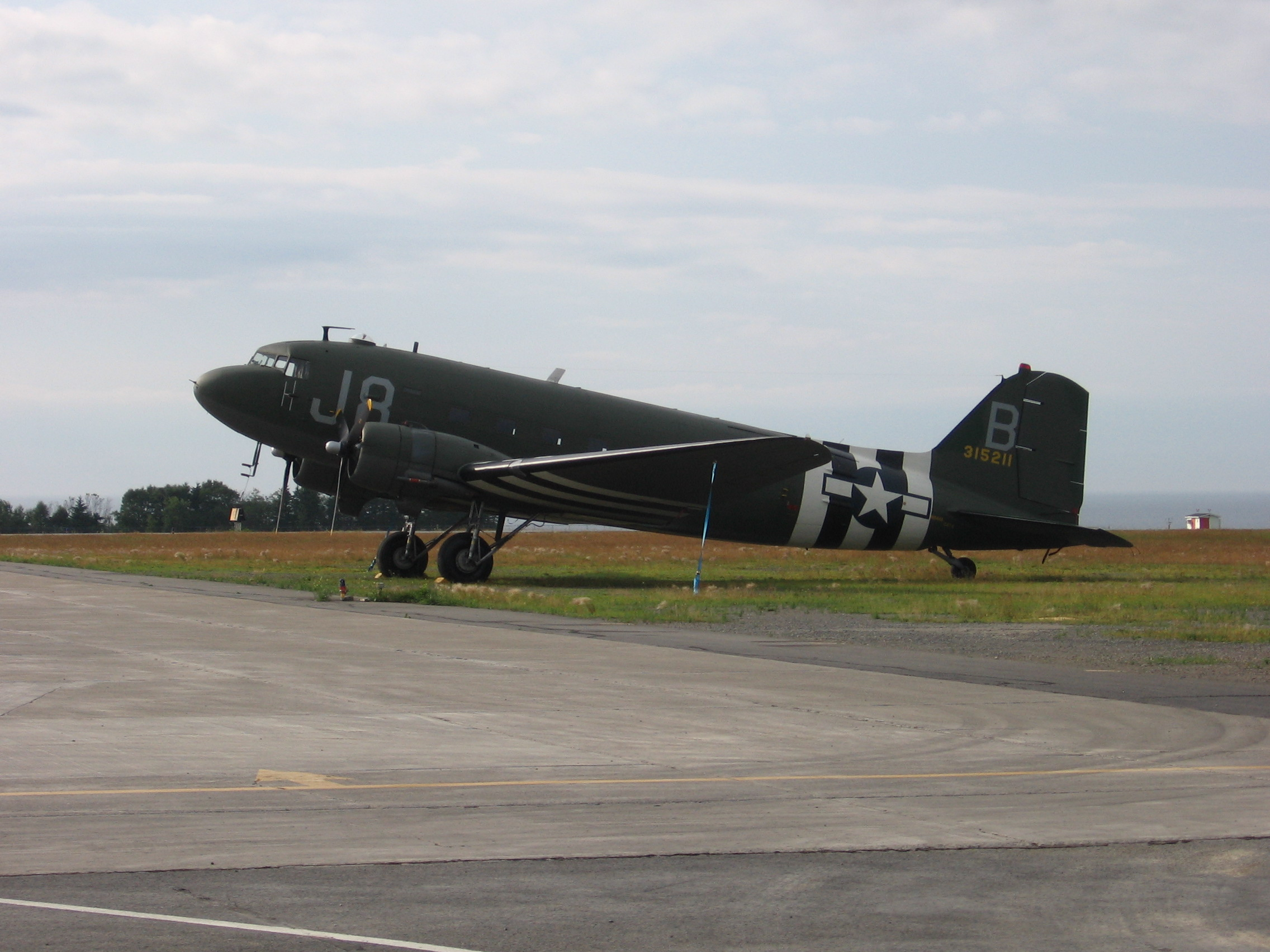
World War II plane in operation at Mont-Joli Airport

=== World War II ===
In the summer of 1940 the Royal Canadian Air Force selected a flat area of farmland between Mont-Joli Station (on the Montreal-Halifax Canadian National Railway mainline) and the Saint Lawrence River for a military airfield. Construction on the aerodrome began in October 1941 and was completed by April 1942 at a cost of $200,000. Three paved runways and 50 buildings were constructed for what became known as RCAF Station Mont-Joli.

Inaugurated on April 15, 1942, RCAF Station Mont-Joli was a training base for the British Commonwealth Air Training Plan and hosted No. 9 Bombing and Gunnery School from 15 December 1941 until 14 April 1945. RCAF Station Mont-Joli was used by RCAF Eastern Air Command during the Battle of the St. Lawrence as a coastal patrol base; during 1942–1944, Canadian cargo ships and warships were sunk by German U-boats in an effort to close the Saint Lawrence Seaway off to shipping. Aircraft staging out of Mont-Joli were among those used to ward off U-boats and ensure the safety of shipping to the eastern tip of the Gaspé Peninsula at Cap-Gaspé.

==== Aerodrome information ====
In approximately 1942 the aerodrome was listed at 48°36′N 68°12′W with a Var. 24 degrees W and elevation of 100 feet (30 m). The aerodrome was listed as with three runways as follows:

Runway name	Length	Width	Surface
6/24	5,000 feet (1,524 m)	150 feet (46 m)	4000' paved
16/34	4,600 feet (1,402 m)	150 feet (46 m)	4000' paved
2/20	5,000 feet (1,524 m)	150 feet (46 m)	4300' paved

=== Post-war (1945–1995) ===
RCAF Station Mont-Joli was decommissioned by the air force in 1945 and became the property of the Department of Transport (now Transport Canada) on December 15, 1945 for use as a civilian airport.

=== Current (1995–present) ===
Its ownership was transferred again in 1995 to the "Régie intermunicipale de l’aéroport régional de Mont-Joli".

It is the busiest airport in eastern Quebec, though still very far from the Québec/Jean Lesage International Airport in Quebec City and Montréal–Trudeau International Airport in Montreal.

In 2007 a second runway (15/33) was opened and runway 06/24 decreased in length from 6,000 ft (1,829 m) to 5,000 ft (1,524 m). In 2017, runway 06/24 was once again extended to 6,000 ft (1,829 m), in order to accommodate the Boeing 737-800. Sunwing Airlines started flying that aircraft type from Mont-Joli to Punta Cana in December 2017.

Air Canada indefinitely suspended its operations at Mont-Joli Airport in June 2020 due to the financial impact of the COVID-19 pandemic in Canada.

== Airlines and destinations ==
Airlines	Destinations
PAL Airlines	Moncton, Wabush
