= JA Douglas McCurdy Sydney Airport =

JA Douglas McCurdy Sydney Airport J.A. Douglas McCurdy Sydney Airport

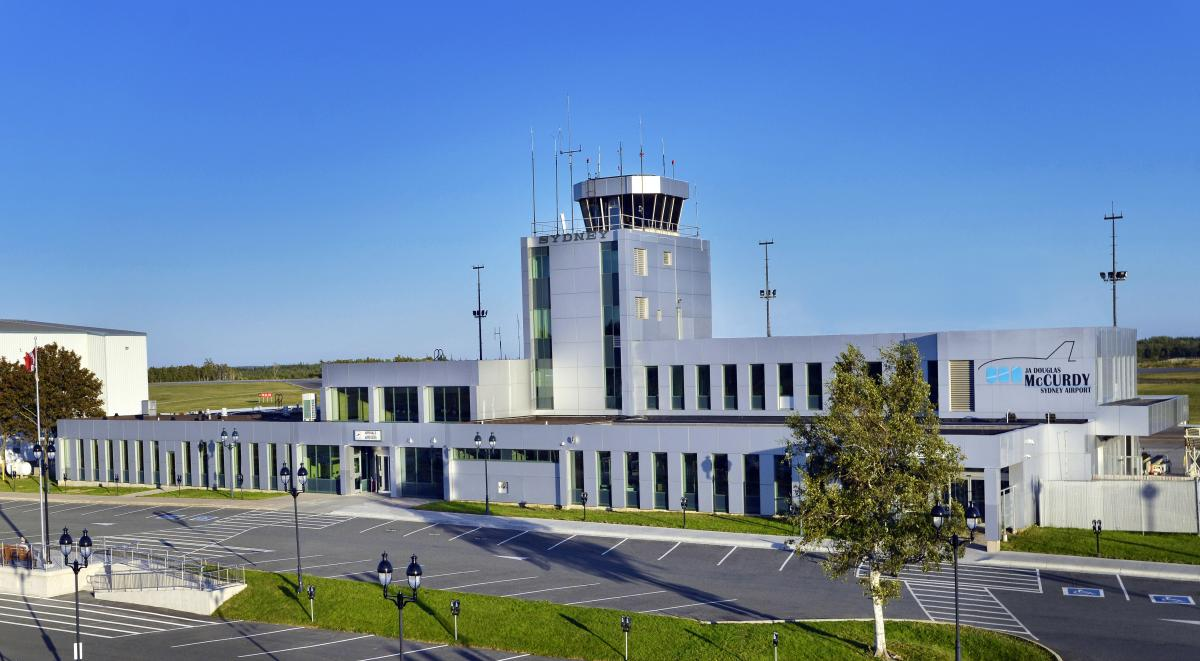
- IATA: YQY; ICAO: CYQY; WMO: 71707

Summary
- Airport type: Public
- Owner/Operator: Sydney Airport Authority
- Serves: Cape Breton Regional Municipality
- Location: Reserve Mines, Nova Scotia
- Opened: June 6, 1929; 97 years ago
- Time zone: AST (UTC−04:00)
  - Summer (DST): ADT (UTC−03:00)
- Elevation AMSL: 203 ft (62 m)
- Coordinates: 46°09′41″N 060°02′53″W
- Website: flyyqy.ca

Map
- Location on Cape Breton Island CYQY (Canada)

Runways
Direction	Length		Surface
Direction	ft	m	Surface
06/24	7,070	2,155	Asphalt
18/36	5,997	1,828	Asphalt

Statistics (2014)
- Aircraft movements: 8,278
- Sources: Canada Flight Supplement; Environment Canada; Movements from Statistics Canada

JA Douglas McCurdy Sydney Airport (IATA: YQY, ICAO: CYQY) is a regional airport located in Reserve Mines in the Canadian province of Nova Scotia. The airport serves the Cape Breton Regional Municipality (CBRM) and the surrounding areas of Cape Breton Island. McCurdy Sydney Airport has the distinction of being the oldest public airport in Nova Scotia, first licensed on August 3, 1929.

The airport features two runways and one passenger terminal, along with several hangars and maintenance facilities.

Nav Canada classifies Sydney as an airport of entry by and as such is staffed by the Canada Border Services Agency (CBSA). CBSA officers at this airport can handle aircraft with no more than 44 passengers, or with staged offloading of up to 200 passengers.

== Airlines and destinations ==
Airlines	Destinations
Air Canada Express	Montréal–Trudeau, Toronto–Pearson
WestJet	Seasonal: Calgary

== Facilities ==
=== Terminal ===
The present Air Terminal Building (ATB) was opened in 1967, and, upon opening, included immigration and customs facilities for international passengers; a restaurant, lounge, gift shop, and car rentals, as well as other amenities for air travelers; a control tower and administrative offices. The terminal has undergone renovations and an expansion over the years. Today, the terminal serves over 180,000 passengers per year.

In addition to passenger services the airport provides facilities and services to business travelers including a boardroom and business centre available for rental.

=== Runways and taxiways ===
There are two runways at McCurdy, one with ILS-I capabilities and the other served by RNAV. The two runways, 06/24 and 18/36, are approximately aligned in the east-west and north-south direction and are served by taxiway K.

Runways
Number	Length	Width	Surface
06/24	7,070 ft (2,150 m)	200 ft (61 m)	Asphalt
18/36	5,997 ft (1,828 m)	150 ft (46 m)	Asphalt

=== Operations ===
The airport serves general aviation, charter and business aircraft with a tarmac with built-in tie downs, self-serve pay-at-the-pump aviation fuel 100LL, a crew room and hangar facilities, catering is available onsite. Jet fuel provided by ASIG (Aircraft Service International Group / Menzies); Ground handling services provided by Airconsol Aviation.

==== Private and charter aircraft services ====
Private aircraft operators have the choice of self-handling, or they can arrange for full FBO (fixed-base operator) services with Gateway Sydney FBO. Hangarage and Helicopter charter services are available on site through Gateway Sydney FBO.

== Ongoing developments ==
On 6 May 2022 Brian Comer, MLA for Cape Breton East, on behalf of Economic Development Minister Susan Corkum-Greek announced a $6.3-million investment from the Province. Some of the funding – $1 million – was to be used to establish a new Air Access Fund, which the Sydney Airport Authority could use for incentives to airlines to establish new routes at the airport. The other $5.3 million was for infrastructure upgrades at the airport including repairs to the primary and secondary runways, upgrades to the main terminal and paving the main road to airport.

On 14 November 2023, Member of Parliament for Cape Breton—Canso, Mike Kelloway, on behalf of the Minister of Transport, Pablo Rodriguez, announced that the Government of Canada funding, through Transport Canada’s Airports Capital Assistance Program, is providing more than $7.4 million to rehabilitate Runway 06-24, including associated edge lights.

== Statistics ==
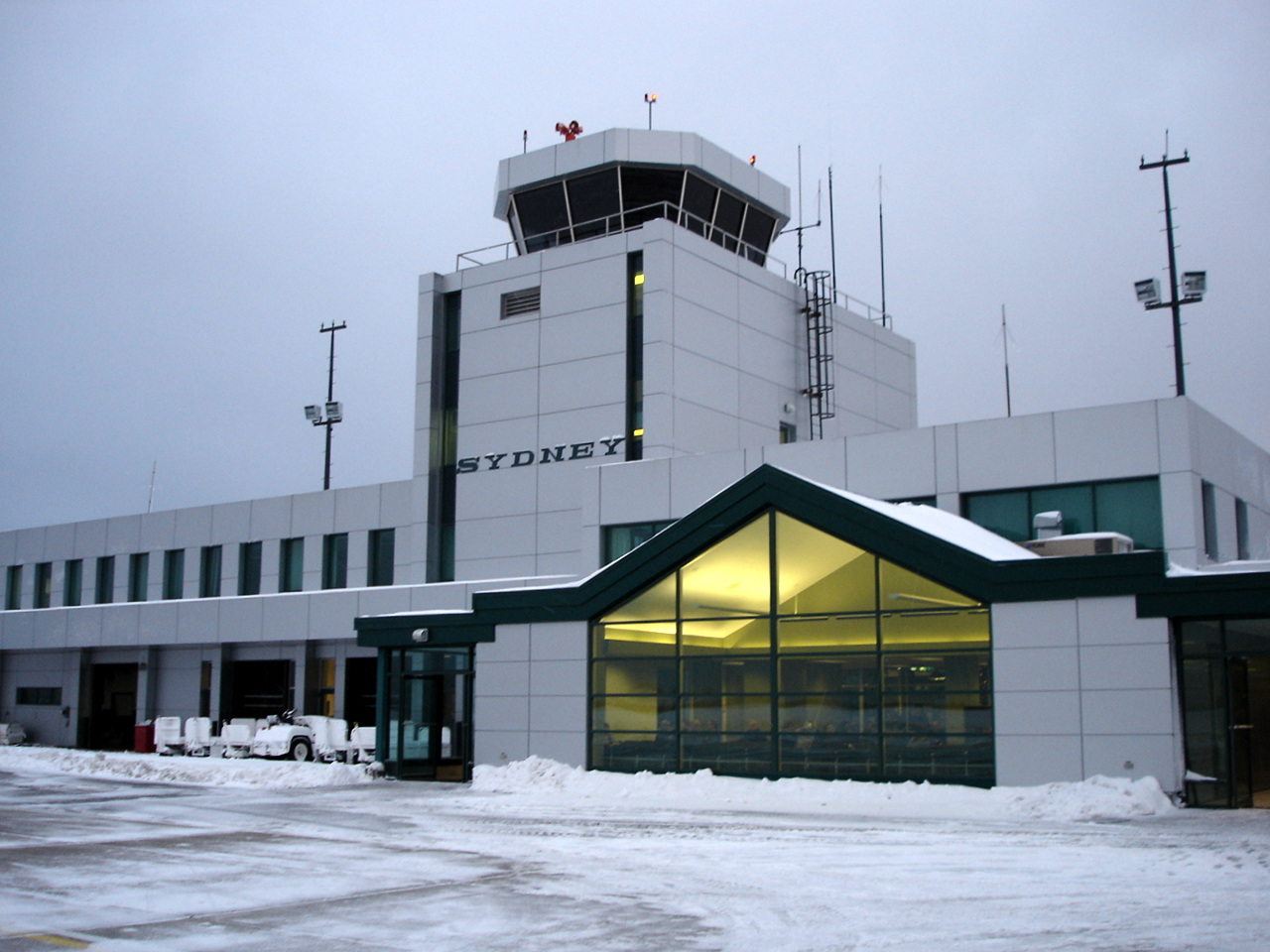
J.A. Douglas McCurdy Airport Terminal in winter

Annual passenger traffic (enplaned and deplaned) at JA Douglas McCurdy Sydney Airport, 1996 through 2020
Year	Passengers	Year	Passengers	Year	Passengers	Year	Passengers
2020		2010	137,946	2000		1990	
2019	179,397	2009	120,896	1999		1989	
2018	190,956	2008	110,709	1998		1988	183,000
2017	188,551	2007	105,699	1997		1987	
2016		2006	99,819	1996		1986	
2015	187,288	2005	91,709	1995		1985	
2014	199,655	2004		1994		1984	
2013	170,022	2003		1993		1983	
2012	154,010	2002		1992		1982	
2011	139,080	2001		1991		1981	

== Ground transportation ==
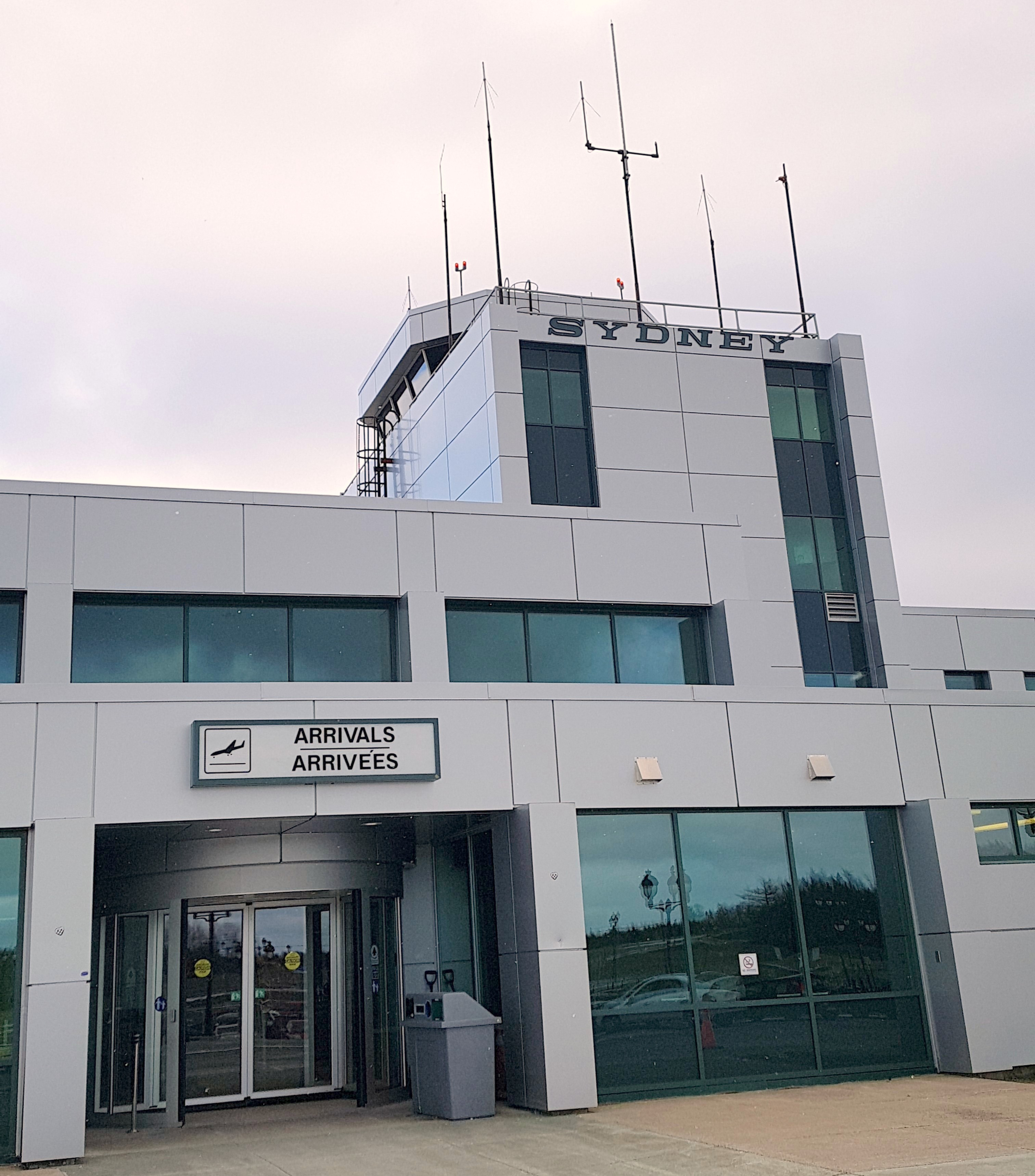
The Sydney/J.A. Douglas McCurdy Airport Arrivals Entrance

=== Car ===
The airport is located on Nova Scotia Trunk 4. It is a 14-minute drive from Downtown Sydney and a 12-minute drive from Glace Bay. There is onsite parking with daily, weekly and yearly rates.

=== Taxi ===
City Wide Taxi provides service at the airport. Arrangements can be made in advance.

== History ==
=== 1928 - The Cape Breton Flying Club ===
By the late 1920s the Canadian government, in hopes of building the nation's aviation sector, made it policy to encourage the establishment of local flying clubs that could lead to increased flight training and the development of community airfields across the country. An Order-in-Council was passed in September 1927 and the Controller of Civil Aviation was tasked with supporting and approving the creation of these flying clubs.

Through this flying club movement the Cape Breton Flying Club was formed in 1928, and in 1929 the club opened an aerodrome on land located along Grand Lake Road, near the community of Reserve, leased from one of its members, Dan MacMillan. All work to build the club's two air strips, each initially 1,800 feet (550 m) long, was done by volunteers, with the nearby town of Glace Bay loaning bulldozers to help clear and level the land, and Mr. MacMillan loaning the club a barn to use as a hangar. The first aircraft to land at the new Cape Breton Flying Club Field was a Buhl Airsedan, named Bluenose, owned by Rollie D. Archibald and flown from San Francisco by Vernon Dorell, arriving at the airfield on June 6, 1929. The flight took thirty hours to complete.

On August 3, 1929, the site was given a temporary airport licence and was listed as a Public Airport in the 1929 List of Licenced Public Airports, Intermediate and Private Aerodromes, Public Seaplane Ports, Seaplane Anchorages in Canada with the following runways:

Runway name	Location	Length
N.-E	N 46 10' 30" - W 60 3' 0"	1,900 ft (580 m)
N.-W	N 46 10' 30" - W 60 3' 0"	1,800 ft (550 m)

The club operated the airport through the 1930s primarily for local air traffic, visiting aviators, and pilot training. From 1929 through at least to 1940 the club operated a number of different Avro 616 Avian IVM aircraft, registrations CF-CAY, CF-CAZ, CF-CDE, CF-CDF, and CF-CDG, and at least one De Havilland DH.60 Moth, registration CF-CED.

=== 1937 to 1945 - RCAF Aerodrome - Sydney ===
In 1937 the government chose a site near the Cape Breton Flying Club's air strip for a new aerodrome for the Royal Canadian Air Force, and in 1938 began construction of the aerodrome which included three four-thousand foot runways. By December 1940, as the new airdrome was nearing completion, No. 8 (BR) Squadron moved operations to Sydney from its former base at Kelly Beach in North Sydney. The new airport was operated through World War II as a RCAF Aerodrome with 8 Squadron tasked with anti-submarine duty while serving with RCAF Eastern Air Command. The RAF Ferry Command and the Return Ferry Service used Sydney as a staging point and as an alternate on their transatlantic operations.

By 1942 all three runways had been extended to 5,000 feet (1,500 metres) to accommodate the largest aircraft. The aerodrome was listed as RCAF Aerodrome - Sydney, Nova Scotia at 46°10′N 60°02′W with a variation of 26 degrees west and elevation of 192 ft (59 m). The field was listed as "all hard surfaced" and had three runways listed as follows:

Runway name	Length	Width	Surface
5/23	5,000 ft (1,524 m)	200 ft (61 m)	Hard surfaced
10/28	5,000 ft (1,524 m)	200 ft (61 m)	Hard surfaced
17/35	5,000 ft (1,524 m)	200 ft (61 m)	Hard surfaced

By May 1942 Sydney Airport had become a regular stop on Trans-Canada Airlines's passenger service which was operating flights across Canada, connecting Sydney to Moncton, New Brunswick, and St. John's, Newfoundland, with the cost per ticket for inter-airport flight, Sydney-Gander or Sydney-St. John's at $8.00.

=== Post-World War II ===
In December 1945, with hostilities at an end, the RCAF handed control of the airport over to the Department of Transport to develop into a civilian aerodrome. All the buildings not required by Transport were declared surplus and sold; the airport was designated as an alternate for the North Atlantic air route, and a licence was issued on March 10, 1947.

Trans-Canada Airlines continued their passenger service to Sydney, with flights from Halifax to Sydney increased to two each day. By 1948 direct operations between Sydney, Moncton, and Saint John's were in place.

=== 1950s through 1990s ===
In October 1950, runway 07-25 was extended to 7,070 feet (2,150 metres), and in 1958 runway 01-19 was extended to 6,000 feet (1,800 metres). In March 1962, runway 14-32 was closed because of its poor condition. A large-scale rebuilding program followed, which included the construction of a new terminal building in 1967.

The western half of the runway 14-32 was reactivated for summer operation in 1976. The ILS (Instrument landing system) on runway 07 was replaced in 1977, and VASIS (Visual approach slope indicator) was installed on runway 25. A new ILS was installed on runway 19 in 1978 to replace one destroyed in a storm in October 1974. The main ramp and taxiway K were extended in 1982.

According to the December 15, 1978 edition of the Official Airline Guide (OAG), two airlines were serving Sydney at this time including Air Canada with two daily nonstops from Halifax, NS operated with McDonnell Douglas DC-9-30 jets with these flights also providing direct no change of plane service from Montreal and Ottawa, and Eastern Provincial Airways with three daily flights operated with Boeing 737-200 jets with two nonstops from Halifax and one nonstop from Stephenville, NL with these services also providing direct no change of plane flights from Gander, NL, Montreal, Saint John, NB and St. John's, NL plus a fourth flight operated daily except on Sundays nonstop from Halifax flown with a Hawker Siddeley HS 748 turboprop.

By 1988 Sydney was served by Air Canada, Canadian Airlines, Air Nova, Air Atlantic, and Air Saint-Pierre. Cape Breton Flying School, Eastern Flying Services Ltd., Versatile Air Services, and Bras d'Or Construction were also based at the airport. Sydney Airport had 183,000 passengers and 17,462 aircraft movements.

=== 1997 divestiture and Sydney Airport Authority ===
The Sydney Airport Authority was created on 7 April 1997. As a result of the National Airports Policy of 1994, Transport Canada was undergoing a program of commercializing and divesting itself of airports, the air navigation system, and ports and harbours across Canada. As a result, on October 1, 1997, ownership of Sydney Airport was transferred to the Sydney Airport Authority who continue to own and operate the airport to this day.

=== 2009 Renaming ===
On July 27, 2009, the Sydney Airport was renamed after John Alexander Douglas McCurdy, a Canadian aviation pioneer who set a series of aviation records, the first British subject to fly a heavier-than-air machine, and the first Canadian to pilot a flying machine in Canada when he flew the Silver Dart off the ice in Baddeck. He was also the holder of Canada's first pilot's licence. He established the first aviation school in Canada, the Curtiss Flying School, and was the first manager of Long Branch Aerodrome, Canada's first airport. At the beginning of the Second World War, McCurdy became Assistant Director General of Aircraft Production. In 1947, McCurdy was appointed Lieutenant Governor of Nova Scotia, a post he continued until 1952.

=== 2024 Unusual visitor ===
On 24 November 2024, an Airbus A300-600ST Beluga enroute from Terceira Island in the Azores, to St. John's diverted to YQY due to inclement weather in St. John's. The aircraft landed around 3 p.m. on Sunday and remained on the terminal apron for the remainder of the day. After an overnight stay, the aircraft flew out at 9 a.m. Monday, heading to Melbourne Orlando International Airport in Florida via Portsmouth International Airport in New Hampshire.

== Misidentification for Sydney, Australia ==
Several travellers intending to fly to Sydney Kingsford Smith Airport in Sydney, Australia mistakenly arrived at JA Douglas McCurdy Sydney Airport after they or their travel agents erroneously booked the wrong airport. The most recent was on March 31, 2017 when a Dutch traveller booked his own flight from Amsterdam arrived in Sydney, Nova Scotia after a layover in Toronto.
