= No. 160 Squadron RCAF =

- Active: 1943–1945
- Disbanded: 15 June 1945
- Country: Canada
- Allegiance: Canada
- Branch: Royal Canadian Air Force
- Role: Bomber Reconnaissance
- Part of: RCAF Eastern Air Command
- Engagements: Second World War: Battle of the Atlantic; Battle of the St. Lawrence
- Battle honours: North-West Atlantic 1943–1945

No. 160 (Bomber Reconnaissance) Squadron was a Royal Canadian Air Force squadron that was active during the Second World War. It was primarily used in an anti-submarine role and flew the Consolidated Canso before disbanding on June 15, 1945.

== See also ==
- RCAF Eastern Air Command
