= Shearwater Heliport =

Airport in Nova Scotia, Canada

Shearwater Heliport Halifax/Shearwater Heliport

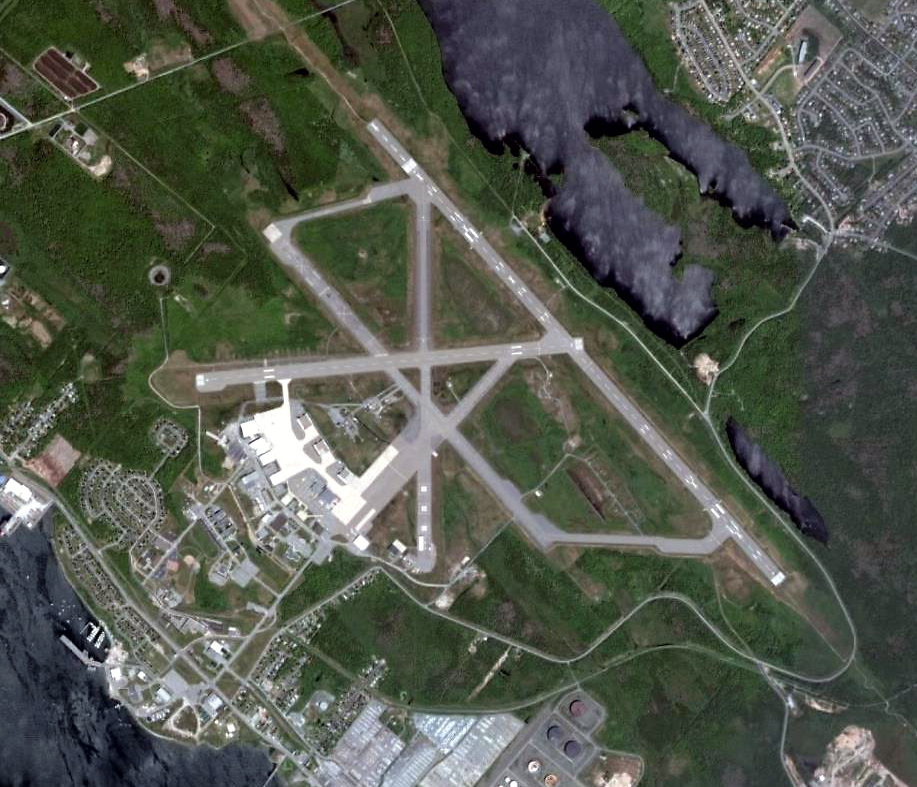
- IATA: none; ICAO: CYAW; WMO: 71601

Summary
- Airport type: Military
- Owner: Government of Canada
- Operator: DND
- Location: Shearwater, Nova Scotia
- Time zone: AST (UTC−04:00)
  - Summer (DST): ADT (UTC−03:00)
- Elevation AMSL: 144 ft / 44 m
- Coordinates: 44°38′14″N 063°30′08″W
- Website: rcaf-arc.forces.gc.ca

Map
- Location in Nova Scotia CYAW (Canada)

Helipads
Number	Length		Surface
Number	ft	m	Surface
16H/34H	3,500	1,067	Asphalt
Pad 2	111 × 111	34 × 34	Concrete
Pad 3	111 × 111	34 × 34	Concrete
Pad 5	117 × 117	36 × 36	Asphalt
Pad 6	117 × 117	36 × 36	Asphalt
- Sources: Canada Flight Supplement; Environment Canada

Shearwater Heliport (ICAO: CYAW), formerly known as Canadian Forces Base Shearwater and commonly referred to as CFB Shearwater and formerly named HMCS Shearwater, is a Canadian Forces facility located 4.5 nautical miles (8.3 km; 5.2 mi) east-southeast of Shearwater, Nova Scotia, on the eastern shore of Halifax Harbour in the Halifax Regional Municipality. Following a base rationalization program in the mid-1990s, the Canadian Forces closed CFB Shearwater as a separate Canadian Forces base and realigned the property's various facilities into CFB Halifax.

Shearwater Heliport is operated by the Royal Canadian Air Force (RCAF). The primary RCAF lodger unit is 12 Wing, commonly referred to as 12 Wing Shearwater, which is headquartered at Shearwater Heliport and provides maritime helicopter operations in support of the Royal Canadian Navy's Maritime Forces Atlantic (MARLANT) from Shearwater Heliport and Maritime Forces Pacific (MARPAC) from Arundel Castle in British Columbia.

Shearwater Jetty, the former CFB Shearwater Annex, provides dock facilities in support of Fleet Diving Unit Atlantic and MARLANT warships.

== History ==
=== 1918–1939 ===
Shearwater is the second-oldest military aerodrome in Canada. In August 1918 the US Navy established Naval Air Station Halifax, or NAS Halifax, at Baker Point on the shores of Eastern Passage to conduct anti-submarine air patrols. Lieutenant Richard E. Byrd was Officer-in-Charge US Naval Air Force in Canada, with six Curtiss HS-2L flying boats operating from NAS Halifax and six from NAS Sydney. Naval air operations in Nova Scotia were intended to be taken over by the Royal Canadian Naval Air Service (RCNAS), but the war ended before the RCNAS could train sufficient personnel.

Following the end of the First World War, the United States Navy gifted its aircraft and flying facilities in Nova Scotia to the Canadian government. The six aircraft at Sydney were shipped to Halifax for storage and the buildings sold at auction. One of the five stations established by the Flying Operations Branch of the Canadian Air Board during their first season of operations in 1920 was the Dartmouth Air Station at the former NAS Halifax. Initially, the station's primary role was overhauling the HS-2L flying boats and dispatching them by air or rail to other stations, where they formed the backbone of civil government flying operations for several years.

In addition to serving as the main repair and overhaul depot for the Air Board's HS-2L flying boats, the Dartmouth Air Station also conducted flying operations. In most years the station flew fewer hours than the other Air Board stations, though some aerial photography operations, surveys, and exercises with the Royal Canadian Navy were carried out each year.

Following the cancellation of part-time training for military pilots on 31 March 1922, the Air Board restructured its flying operations, merging the Flying Operations Branch into the Canadian Air Force in June. Changes to the organization of the air stations were deferred to the fall to avoid administrative issues during the flying season. On 25 November 1922 the Dartmouth Air Station was renamed CAF Unit Dartmouth and the civilian personnel were commissioned or enlisted into the Canadian Air Force. The name changed again when the Canadian Air Force was granted the royal prefix effective 13 March 1923, becoming RCAF Unit Dartmouth, then RCAF Station Dartmouth in early October. None of these changes, nor the official formation of the Royal Canadian Air Force on 1 April 1924, substantially altered the role of the station.

Though the scale of flying operations had increased substantially in 1923 and 1924, the year-round maintenance operations did not continue after the winter of 1923–24. At the end of the 1924 flying season the station was placed on "care and maintenance" with only a skeleton staff to maintain the buildings. The station re-opened in the late spring of 1925 to resume photographic survey operations and artillery co-operation exercises. In July 1925, retroactive to 1 April, all the RCAF's civil operations stations were re-designated as numbered squadrons, with Dartmouth becoming No. 4 (Operations) Squadron.

No. 4 Squadron was inactive from the end of the 1925 flying season, but re-opened the station in 1927 and flew more hours than any previous year. Operations for 1927 were mainly photographic surveys using a Canadian Vickers Varuna, but also included some early experiments in forest dusting with a Keystone Puffer. On 1 July 1927 the RCAF's civil operations were transferred to the new Directorate of Civil Government Air Operations (CGAO), and No. 4 (Operations) Squadron again became the Dartmouth Air Station. This directorate was nominally civilian, the director reporting directly to the Deputy Minister of National Defence, but was still staffed almost entirely by attached or seconded RCAF personnel. The following year all photographic operations were re-organized as independent detachments reporting directly to CGAO headquarters, and the Dartmouth Air Station was placed on "care and maintenance" again at the end of the 1927 season. The facilities continued to be used by mobile photographic detachments operating into the Maritimes from the Ottawa Air Station.

In May 1932 detachments of the Ottawa Air Station were formed at Dartmouth, Shediac, and Gaspé to assist the Royal Canadian Mounted Police in combatting rum-running. On 1 November 1932 the Civil Government Air Operations directorate was merged back into the RCAF amid major budget cuts to all government flying.

On 16 April 1934, No. 5 (Flying Boat) Squadron was officially formed at Halifax to control the five patrol detachments on the east coast (additional detachments had been formed at Sydney and Rimouski in 1933). The headquarters of No. 5 Squadron moved to Dartmouth on 1 November 1934. When the RCAF decided, in 1937, to primarily operate landplanes for the defence of the Atlantic coast, Dartmouth was one of four locations selected for construction of a land aerodrome. The station officially became RCAF Station Dartmouth again on 1 April 1938 when a station headquarters was established to control both No. 5 Squadron and No. 4 Repair Depot.

=== World War II ===
The station was known as RCAF Station Dartmouth through the Second World War.

==== Aerodrome ====
In approximately 1942 the aerodrome was listed as RCAF Aerodrome - Dartmouth, Nova Scotia at 44°38′N 63°30′W with a variation of 23 degrees west and elevation of 141 ft (43 m). The field was listed as "all hard surfaced" and had four runways but only the first is readable as follows:

Runway name	Length	Width	Surface
2/20	5,000 ft (1,500 m)	200 ft (61 m)	Hard Surfaced

By January 1943 the runway information had been updated and the four runways were listed as follows:

Runway name	Length	Width	Surface
2/20	5,900 ft (1,800 m)	200 ft (61 m)	Hard Surfaced
6/24	4,400 ft (1,300 m)	200 ft (61 m)	Hard Surfaced
11/29	5,400 ft (1,600 m)	200 ft (61 m)	Hard Surfaced
16/34	5,300 ft (1,600 m)	200 ft (61 m)	Hard Surfaced

=== Post-war ===
In 1948, the Royal Canadian Navy (RCN) took over the facility, naming it HMCS Shearwater (after the First World War sloop of the same name), also known as Royal Canadian Naval Air Station Shearwater (RCNAS Shearwater).

The combined land and sea-based aerodromes were used to station carrier-based maritime patrol and fighter aircraft. Shearwater was also the home to early experiments with ship-borne helicopters—something which was copied by navies around the world. During the 1960s, the aerodrome at the former RCAF Station Debert was attached to HMCS Shearwater as a training location for carrier landings.

The February 1, 1968 unification of the three service branches into the Canadian Forces saw HMCS Shearwater change its name to Canadian Forces Base Shearwater (CFB Shearwater).

Base rationalization and defence budget cutbacks for the Canadian Forces during the mid-1990s saw a largely administrative move when the formation CFB Shearwater stood down and the facilities transferred to the formation CFB Halifax and aircraft operations becoming the responsibility of newly formed 12 Wing. 12 Wing is headquartered at Shearwater and reports to 1 Canadian Air Division.

== Heliport conversion project ==
During the late 1990s and early 2000s the Shearwater airfield was scaled back significantly as the facility transitioned to a heliport with surplus lands identified and transferred to Canada Lands Company. Prior to 2002, Shearwater had two asphalt runways:

Runway name	Length
10/28	5,692 feet (1,735 m)
16/34	8,998 feet (2,743 m)

By 2002 only runway 10/28 remained open. As part of the Department of National Defence's Shearwater Heliport Conversion Project, runway 10H/28H was reduced in length to the east end only in July 2007. At the same time, runway 16H/34H was reopened, but for helicopter operations only.

These changes allowed for heliport operations including instrument approaches and were accompanied with the construction of other non-airfield facilities in support of the Maritime Helicopter Project. Shearwater Heliport opened July 31, 2008, consisting of a new 16H/34H and various helipads for helicopter operations only.

As part of the heliport conversion project, the old runway 16/34 was permanently closed and placed outside (east) of a new fence for the Shearwater Heliport, as shown in the Canada Flight Supplement effective 31 July 2008. This land for the old runway 16/34 was then transferred by the Department of National Defence to the Canada Lands Company for sale. On 3 April 2009 the land for the old runway 16/34 was re-transferred from Canada Lands Company back to DND, however its future use is unknown.

Shearwater Heliport's primary mission remains as a heliport in support of the Royal Canadian Navy's Maritime Forces Atlantic warships with shipborne helicopters operated by 12 Wing, a unit of the Royal Canadian Air Force.

12 Wing's squadrons at Shearwater Heliport in Nova Scotia and at Arundel Castle in British Columbia operate the Sikorsky CH-148 Cyclone. There are numerous construction projects ongoing at Shearwater Heliport in support of the Maritime Helicopter Project, including the Maritime Helicopter Training Centre where No. 406 Squadron will be located, as well as a new No.423 (MH) Squadron hangar facility, a new 12 Air Maintenance Squadron facility with six repair bays, and a new Operational Support Facility where the Helicopter Operational Test and Evaluation Facility (HOTEF) and various 12 Wing headquarter functions will be located.

== Current operations ==
Current operations at Shearwater are administratively and operationally part of CFB Halifax and revolve around two functionally separate facilities:

- Shearwater Heliport - heliport and related infrastructure largely supports the operations of 12 Wing, a unit of the RCAF which provides maritime helicopter services to the Royal Canadian Navy; and
- Shearwater Jetty - docks and shore-based infrastructure largely supports the fleet operations of Maritime Forces Atlantic and function as the home to Fleet Diving Unit Atlantic (FDU-A), as well as providing secure docking facilities (isolated from downtown Halifax) for visiting NATO warships including nuclear-powered submarines and aircraft carriers.
- adjunct facilities formerly aligned with CFB Shearwater such as the Hartlen Point Golf Course are now attached to CFB Halifax
- Regional Cadet Support Unit (Atlantic) is also based at Shearwater.

=== 12 Wing ===
The Shearwater Heliport is the location of the headquarters of 12 Wing, whose sole purpose is to support and operate shipborne helicopters for the Royal Canadian Navy. 12 Wing is a RCAF unit and reports to 1 Canadian Air Division.

12 Wing operates out of two locations with four squadrons:

- Shearwater Heliport
  - 406 Maritime Operational Training Squadron is an operational training squadron for training all maritime helicopter aircrew in the Canadian Forces.
  - 423 Maritime Helicopter Squadron is an operational squadron at Shearwater Heliport which provides CH-148 Cyclone helicopters for Maritime Forces Atlantic warships.
  - 12 Air Maintenance Squadron provides aircraft maintenance and engineering support to 12 Wing's operational squadrons.
  - Helicopter Operational and Test Evaluation Facility (HOTEF) is responsible for researching and testing state-of-the-art equipment to help enable crews to operate efficiently, ashore or while deployed.
- Arundel Castle
  - 443 Maritime Helicopter Squadron is an operational squadron which operates CH-148 Cyclone helicopters for Maritime Forces Pacific warships.

== Air shows ==
Beginning in the 1970s, CFB Shearwater began hosting an Armed Forces Day every fall, typically on the weekend following Labour Day, and included an air show where the long and wide runways at Shearwater hosted some of the largest aircraft in the world, including the U.S. Air Force's C-5 Galaxy transport planes and B-52 Stratofortress bombers.

By the 1980s this air show came to be named the "Shearwater International Air Show" and was a popular event for military aviation enthusiasts in Eastern Canada and the Northeastern United States as the location of CFB Shearwater, coupled with the popularity of the Halifax area among military aircrew, resulted in heavy international participation from the RCAF, as well as the USAF, United States Navy, United States Marine Corps, Royal Air Force and numerous other NATO air forces in Europe.

Defence cutbacks and unit and facility realignments from 1994 to 1996 saw CFB Shearwater stand down as a separate formation and the facility merged as an airfield attached to CFB Halifax. At this time, the military-organized "Shearwater International Air Show" was transferred to a civilian organization that saw the event renamed to the "Nova Scotia International Air Show."

Organizers of the "Nova Scotia International Air Show" continued to make use the Shearwater airfield for both ground displays and the air show component until 2002. Modifications to the airfield from 2002 onward as part of the Shearwater Heliport Conversion Project saw runways closed, eliminating the ability of fixed-wing aircraft to land at Shearwater, forcing the airshow to remove the static (ground) display component of the event, with the air show component continuing to be staged in the skies over Shearwater (using the nearby Halifax Stanfield International Airport as the fixed-wing airfield).

The inconvenience of not having a ground component for the "Nova Scotia International Air Show" as a result of the Shearwater Heliport Conversion Project saw the entire event moved to Halifax Stanfield International Airport beginning in 2004. From 2004 to 2008 the show was held at Halifax Stanfield International Airport which allowed for both static (ground) display and air show at the same venue, however the airport was deemed unsuitable due to numerous interruptions in the air show component by civilian air traffic movements.

The air show moved to Yarmouth Airport in 2009 but returned to Shearwater in 2010, the first time since 2003 that an air show was held at the historic airfield (but again with no ground component). In 2011 the air show was renamed the "Atlantic Canada International Airshow" and was held at the Summerside Airport, formerly CFB Summerside, to commemorate the 70th anniversary of the establishment of that base. Organizers have stated that the "Atlantic Canada International Air Show" will likely rotate through the Shearwater airfield every second year.

== Accidents and incidents ==
- 31 May 1957: An RCN McDonnell F2H-3 Banshee, BuNo 126313, Sqn. No. 104 of VF-870, spiraled out of control after its right wing broke in half during a high-speed flyby. The canopy was observed to separate from the aircraft, but the pilot did not eject and was killed when the plane slammed into McNabs Island. The crash was attributed to improperly manufactured fittings in the folding wing mechanism, and most RCN and US Navy Banshees were grounded until improved fittings could be installed.
- 27 August 1957: An RCN F2H-3 Banshee, BuNo 126306, Sqn. No. 103 of VF-870, was performing touch-and-go landings on runway 16 when it collided with an RCN General Motors TBM-3E Avenger, BuNo 53358, of squadron VC-921, that was taking off from intersecting runway 20. The pilots of both aircraft were killed. Due to an inoperable radio, the Banshee pilot did not hear instructions from the control tower to go around, and apparently did not see red flares launched from the control tower due to patchy fog over the airfield and a possible lack of situational awareness.
- 25 October 1960: An RCN F2H-3 Banshee, BuNo 126415, struck a portable practice landing mirror and tow truck that had been left on runway 16R after an earlier CS2F Tracker landing exercise was postponed due to rain. Two VF-870 Banshees were subsequently cleared for a formation landing and continuing rain prevented the pilots from seeing the unlit mirror in time to take evasive action; one aircraft struck the mirror at high speed, shearing off the left-hand wingtip and auxiliary wingtip fuel tank, demolishing the mirror, and damaging the tow truck. The pilot was able to maintain directional control and stop the Banshee on the runway, but the impact caused irreparable internal damage to the airframe, and the aircraft was written off. The incident is attributed to the failure of Shearwater air traffic controllers to alert the pilots that the mirror was parked on the runway.

== See also ==
- Shearwater Aviation Museum
- Swissair Flight 111
