= No. 5 Squadron RCAF =

- Active: 1934-1945
- Disbanded: 15 July 1945
- Country: Canada
- Branch: Royal Canadian Air Force
- Role: Bomber Reconnaissance
- Part of: RCAF Eastern Air Command
- Nickname(s): Gannet
- Motto(s): VOLANDO VINCIMUS - "By Flying We Conquer"
- Engagements: Second World War: Battle of the Atlantic; Battle of the St. Lawrence
- Battle honours: North West Atlantic, 1939-1945

No. 5 Squadron RCAF was a Royal Canadian Air Force squadron that was active during the Second World War. It was primarily used in an anti-submarine role with Eastern Air Command and was based at Dartmouth, Nova Scotia, Gander, Newfoundland, Torbay, Newfoundland, Yarmouth, Nova Scotia and Sydney, Nova Scotia. The squadron flew the Supermarine Stranraer, Consolidated Canso and Consolidated Catalina before disbanding on 15 July 1945.

== History ==
No. 5 (Flying Boat) Squadron was formed at Dartmouth, Nova Scotia by the 16 April 1934 consolidation of Nos. 8, 9, 10, 11, and 12 Detachments in The Maritimes, which had been formed at Ottawa in 1932. Equipped with the Fairchild 71, the squadron flew anti-smuggling and -illegal immigration patrols in support of the Royal Canadian Mounted Police.

== Victories ==
- 4 May 1943 - U-209

== See also ==
- Convoy ONS 5
