= RCAF Western Air Command =

Western Air Command
- Active: 15 March 1938 – 1 March 1947
- Country: Canada
- Allegiance: Canada
- Branch: Royal Canadian Air Force
- Engagements: Second World War: Pacific Coast; Aleutian Islands Campaign; Fūsen Bakudan Campaign

Western Air Command was the part of the Royal Canadian Air Force's Home War Establishment responsible for air operations on the Pacific coast of Canada during the Second World War.

== History ==
=== Patrol operations ===
When Canada declared war against Germany in September 1939 the command consisted of only five squadrons. Four of them equipped with obsolete aircraft including a bomber squadron with aircraft from the Great War and there were no fighter aircraft at all for its only fighter squadron (113 Fighter Squadron was thus disbanded).

With the Japanese threat after Pearl Harbor it grew rapidly and played a critical role in fighter and anti-submarine operations in Canadian and American waters during the Aleutian Islands Campaign. It was there that Squadron Leader K.A. Boomer of No. 111 Squadron shot down a Rufe fighter, the RCAF's only kill in the Pacific Theatre. On 7 July 1942 a Bristol Bolingbroke pressed home an attack on the Japanese submarine Ro-32 the pilot F/Sgt. P.M.G. Thomas of No. 115 Squadron RCAF then led American destroyers to sink the damaged submarine.

By January 1943 Western Air Command had expanded to include many bomber, fighter and operational units under its control. By the end of the war the command would involve some twenty squadrons when the last units to join were added in 1943. These were the 163 Army Cooperation Squadron in March flying Bristol Bolingbrokes and Hawker Hurricanes. In May the 160 Bomber-Reconnaissance Squadron was added flying Cansos (Catalinas) from Sea Island BC (before moving to Yarmouth, NS in July) and the 166 Communication Squadron formed in September flying various types. In addition to the new squadrons, new aircraft types came on line replacing the command's remaining Supermarine Stranraers and Blackburn Sharks with Cansos and the Bolingbrokes and Beauforts with the Lockheed Ventura. Countless training missions and operational patrols bolstered the air activity over the coastal areas but there was not much action until RCAF Western Command was on the look out for General Kusaba's fire balloons that the Japanese called the Fūsen Bakudan Campaign.

In February and March 1945, P-40 fighter pilots from 133 Squadron, Royal Canadian Air Force operating out of RCAF Patricia Bay (Victoria, British Columbia), intercepted and destroyed two fire balloons, On 21 February, Pilot Officer E. E. Maxwell While shot down a balloon, which landed on Sumas Mountain, in Washington State. On 10 March, Pilot Officer J. O. Patten destroyed a balloon near Salt Spring Island, British Columbia. During another interception a Canso forced down a fire balloon which was examined at the army headquarters.

=== Operational training units ===
Patrol activity was joined by the Operational Training Schools (OTS) operated by Number 4 Training Command of the BCATP. They were the No. 3 OTS flying the Canso and Catalina and No. 32 OTS with Ansons, Beauforts and Swordfish at Patricia Bay. In April, 1944 the No. 5 OTS Heavy Conversion unit stood up at Boundary Bay when 16 B-24 Liberators arrived fresh from American factories. By the end of September 1944 RCAF 5 O.T.U. had grown to a sizeable force of some 87 aircraft including 38 B-24 Liberators, 35 B-25 Mitchells, 5 Bolingbrokes, 8 P-40 Kittyhawks and a single Norseman.

=== Post war ===
With the end of the war in Europe these aircraft were joined by a number of Victory Aircraft Lancaster X bombers which were to be used to train the British Commonwealth's Very Long Range Bomber Tiger Force that would soon be sent to bomb the Japanese mainland from Okinawa. With the unconditional surrender of Japan the RCAF's Tiger Force bomber squadrons were disbanded before they flew overseas and the total draw down of the Western Air Command was suddenly undertaken. Within several months almost all the flying squadrons would be completely stood down.

== Order of battle ==
=== 1 January 1943 ===
HQ Vancouver, British Columbia.

No. 2 Group. HQ Victoria, British Columbia

Squadron	Type of Aircraft	Station
No. 4 Squadron RCAF	Consolidated Canso	RCAF Station Ucluelet
No. 14 Squadron RCAF	Curtiss Kittyhawk	RCAF Station Sea Island
No. 120 Squadron RCAF	Supermarine Stranraer	RCAF Station Coal Harbour
No. 122 Squadron RCAF	Various	RCAF Station Patricia Bay
No. 132 Squadron RCAF	Curtiss Kittyhawk	RCAF Station Tofino
No. 133 Squadron RCAF	Hawker Hurricane	RCAF Station Boundary Bay
No. 135 Squadron RCAF	Hawker Hurricane	RCAF Station Patricia Bay
No. 147 Squadron RCAF	Bristol Bolingbroke	RCAF Station Sea Island
No. 149 Squadron RCAF	Bristol Beaufort	RCAF Station Patricia Bay

No.4 Group. HQ Prince Rupert, British Columbia

Squadron	Type of Aircraft	Station
No. 6 Squadron RCAF	Supermarine Stranraer	RCAF Station Alliford Bay
No. 7 Squadron RCAF	Blackburn Shark	RCAF Station Prince Rupert
No. 9 Squadron RCAF	Supermarine Stranraer	RCAF Station Bella Bella

Detached operations
"X" Wing. HQ Anchorage, Alaska.

Squadron	Type of Aircraft	Station
No. 8 Squadron RCAF	Bristol Bolingbroke	Anchorage, Alaska- transferred to Sea Island 26 Feb
No. 14 Squadron RCAF	Curtiss Kittyhawk	Anchorage, Alaska- replaced 8 Sqn 2 Mar
No. 111 Squadron RCAF	Curtiss Kittyhawk	Kodiak, Alaska

"Y" Wing. HQ Annette Island, Alaska.

Squadron	Type of Aircraft	Station
No. 115 Squadron RCAF	Bristol Bolingbroke	Annette Island, Alaska
No. 118 Squadron RCAF	Curtiss Kittyhawk	Annette Island, Alaska

== See also ==
- RCAF Eastern Air Command
- No. 113 Squadron RCAF
- 438 Tactical Helicopter Squadron
- 440 Transport Squadron
- 442 Transport and Rescue Squadron
- American Theater (1939-1945)
