= Tofino-Long Beach Airport =

Airport in British Columbia, Canada

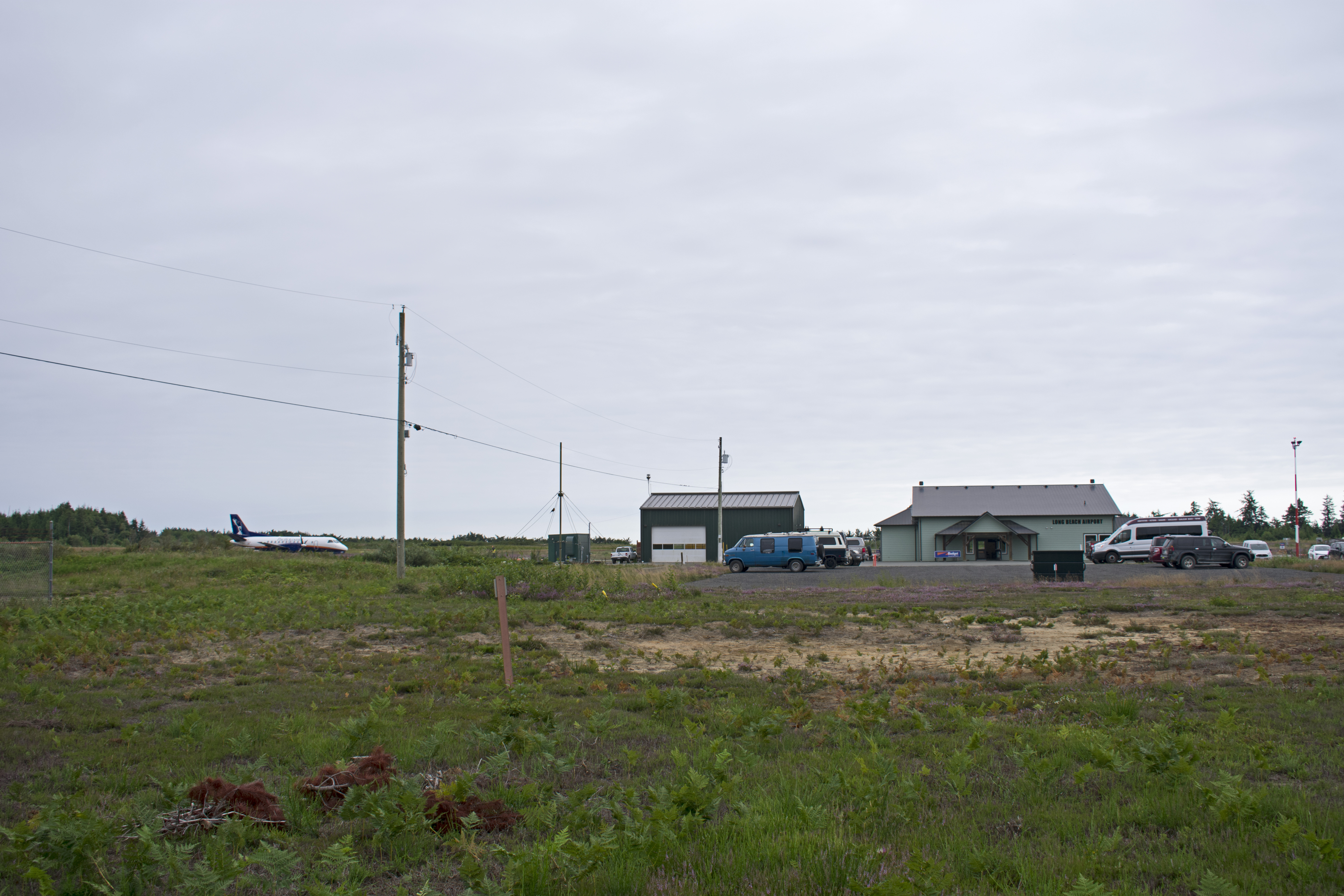
- IATA: YAZ; ICAO: CYAZ; WMO: 71106

Summary
- Airport type: Public
- Operator: Alberni-Clayoquot Regional District Airport
- Serves: Tofino, British Columbia
- Location: Tofino, British Columbia
- Time zone: MST (UTC−07:00)
- Elevation AMSL: 80 ft (24 m)
- Coordinates: 49°04′55″N 125°46′21″W
- Website: www.tofinoairport.com

Map
- Location in British Columbia CYAZ (Canada)

Runways
Direction	Length		Surface
Direction	ft	m	Surface
07/25	5,000	1,524	Concrete
11/29	5,000	1,524	Asphalt
16/34	5,000	1,524	Concrete

Statistics (2010)
- Aircraft movements: 4,679
- Source: Canada Flight Supplement; Environment Canada; Movements from Statistics Canada

Tofino-Long Beach Airport (IATA: YAZ, ICAO: CYAZ) is a non-towered airport that is located within the Pacific Rim National Park Reserve. Immediately adjacent to Long Beach, it is 6 nautical miles (11 km; 6.9 mi) southeast of Tofino, British Columbia, Canada.

It is both a general aviation and commercial airport, used by both private aircraft and seasonal commercial services.

Coastal fog is a common morning phenomenon in the summer, complicating access by air until the weather clears. Global Positioning System (GPS) instrument flight rules (IFR) approaches are available to all runways. Formerly, non-directional beacon (NDB) approaches were possible prior to the decommissioning of the Tofino NDB on March 21st, 2024. Tofino airport is equipped for nighttime operations.

== History ==
RCAF Station Tofino was constructed in 1941 to defend Canada's Pacific coast from Axis attack during the Second World War. In 1945, the site was decommissioned, to be reopened again as a radar station in the Pinetree Line in 1955 to defend against Soviet attack. The radar station was closed in 1958, at which time it became a civilian airfield. It is currently owned and operated by Alberni-Clayoquot Regional District.

== Airlines and destinations ==
Airlines	Destinations
Pacific Coastal Airlines	Vancouver
Harbour Air	Seasonal: Vancouver

== Facilities ==
A small terminal building was completed in 2010. It contains airline kiosks, a waiting area, washrooms, and food vending machines.

Additional Services include:

- Budget Rent a Car - kiosk inside terminal building
- Aviation fuel (cardlock) - Avgas and Jet A
- Parking - 80 spaces, free

Additional structures include:

- Small maintenance hangar
- Service vehicle shed (2 bays)
- Salt dome
- Metal storage sheds (2)
- Long wood shed

Environment Canada has a weather station on site, operated by a private contractor.

== Transportation ==
No direct transit links exist. The nearest bus stop at Long Beach is a 25-minute walk from the airport. Taxis and ridesharing are available upon request.

The airport is adjacent to Pacific Rim Highway which was completed in 1959, connecting Tofino and Ucluelet with Port Alberni. The airport is accessed via a short drive down Airport Road, passing some abandoned Royal Canadian Air Force structures.

== See also ==
- List of airports on Vancouver Island
