= Michael Poole =

Michael Poole may refer to:

- Michael Poole (activist), Canadian intentional community founder
- Michael Poole (producer), Canadian film maker and author
- Mick Poole (footballer) (born 1955), English footballer
- Mick Poole (speedway rider) (born 1966), Australian speedway rider
- Michael Poole (politician) (born 1984), Falkland Islands politician
- Mike Poole (born 1986), Welsh rugby union player
