= No. 6 Squadron RCAF =

- Active: 1936–1945
- Country: Canada
- Branch: Royal Canadian Air Force
- Role: Bomber Reconnaissance
- Part of: RCAF Western Air Command
- Battle honours: Pacific Coast 1941-1945

Insignia
- Unit code: XE (1939–1942), AF (1942)

No. 6 (Bomber Reconnaissance) Squadron was a Royal Canadian Air Force squadron that was active during the Second World War.

It was formed on 4 March 1936 at RCAF Station Trenton as a Torpedo Bomber squadron before moving to RCAF Station Jericho Beach in 1938. During the war it was primarily used in an anti-submarine role with Western Air Command, flying from Jericho Beach and Coal Harbour. The squadron flew the Blackburn Shark, Supermarine Stranraer, Consolidated Canso and Consolidated Catalina before disbanding on 7 August 1945.

== History ==
=== Formation and prewar service ===
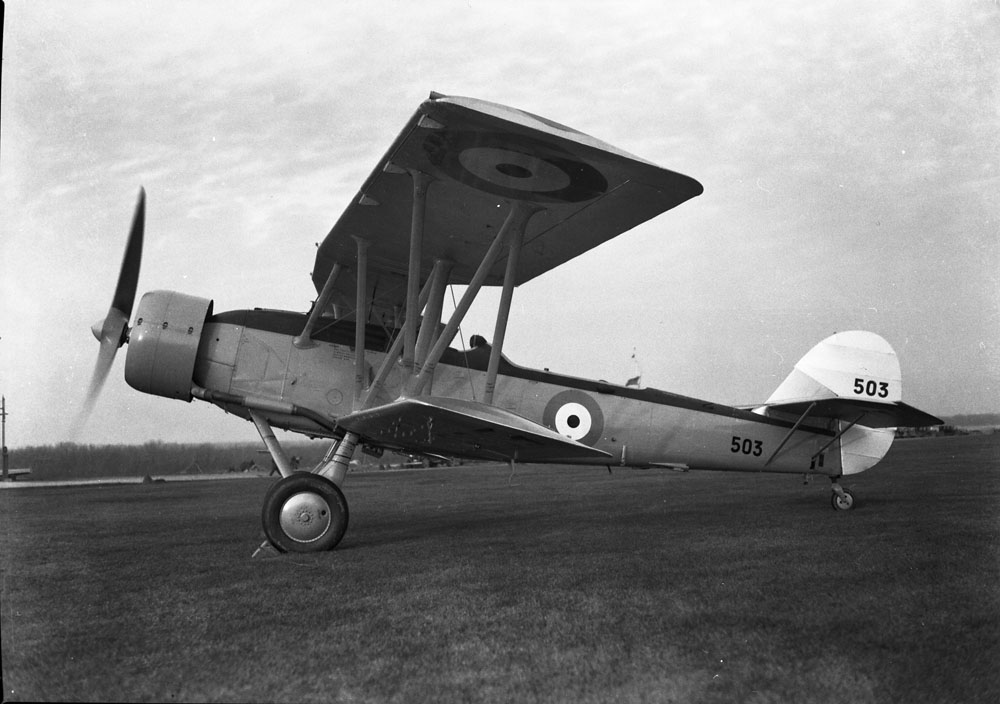
A Blackburn Shark at Rockcliffe destined for No. 6 Squadron, 1936

No. 6 Squadron was authorized as a Torpedo Bomber unit on 4 March 1936 at the RCAF main training base in Trenton, Ontario, under the control of RCAF headquarters. It began service training with Canadian Vickers Vedette flying boats before receiving Blackburn Shark torpedo bombers from England in January 1937. Flight Lieutenant C.L. Trecarten became commander on 23 November 1936; subsequent prewar commanders were RAF Flight Lieutenant E.A. Springall from 18 February 1938, and Wing Commander A.H. Hull from 13 June of the latter year. In November 1938 it relocated to Jericho Beach, British Columbia, joining Western Air Command there on 5 November after departing Trenton on the first day of the month. The squadron trained in torpedo dropping at Jericho Beach.

=== Second World War ===
It was mobilized for the Second World War on 10 September 1939, and flew its first mission on the next day – a patrol of the Strait of Georgia area from Gabriola Island to the Pender Islands. These patrols, which had been begun by the RCAF on 2 September, were to identify and report all shipping transiting the Vancouver area. Between 12 September 1939 and 1 May 1940 the squadron detached two aircraft to Ucluelet. It was redesignated as a bomber reconnaissance squadron on 31 October 1939, and flew anti-submarine patrols for the rest of the war. Squadron Leader L.E. Wray replaced Hull on 4 February 1940; subsequent wartime commanders were Squadron Leaders M.G. Doyle from 6 November, B.N. Harrop from 25 August 1941, H.J. Winny OBE from 1 April 1942, G.C. Upson from 25 August, V.A. Margetts from 14 December, and L.A. Harling from 22 September 1943. Its last commander was Wing Commander A.C. Neale AFC from 20 September 1944. The squadron relocated to Alliford Bay on 15 May 1940, and during the year received at least three Noorduyn Norseman floatplane utility aircraft. After receiving Supermarine Stranraer flying boats in November 1941, it gave up its Sharks and Norsemans in December of that year. The squadron came under the control of the newly formed No. 4 Group RCAF on 16 June 1942 and reverted to Western Air Command on 1 April 1944 when the latter was abolished. Between 19 November and 3 December 1942 the squadron relocated to Bella Bella for a movement exercise. The Stanraers were replaced by the Consolidated Canso A between April and May 1943. In September of that year it received Consolidated Catalina IB and IIIAs, giving up its Cansos in November. The squadron again received Cansos in March 1944, operating these and the Catalinas for the rest of its existence. The squadron relocated to Coal Harbour on 23 April 1944, remaining there for the rest of its existence.

On 12 March 1945, the Canso crew of Flight Lieutenant Moodie sighted a partially deflated Japanese fire balloon over Rupert Inlet, and forced it down on the south side of Rupert Arm by flying above it. The balloon was subsequently recovered by a ground party and sent to Western Air Command headquarters for inspection. As the war drew to a close, the squadron was disbanded on 7 August after flying its last patrol on 1 August. The squadron flew 2,506 sorties during the war, and had a total of 11,716 operational flying hours and 10,565 non-operational flying hours. Its only losses were two aircraft and nine aircrew killed in non-operational incidents. None of its personnel received decorations. It earned the battle honour Pacific Coast 1941-1945, but was never awarded it due to its disbandment.

== Lineage ==
- Authorized as No. 6 (Torpedo Bomber) Squadron on 1 November 1935

Redesignated No. 6 (Bomber Reconnaissance) Squadron on 1 September 1939
Disbanded on 7 August 1945.

=== Assignments ===
- RCAF Headquarters, 4 March 1936
- Western Air Command, 5 November 1938
- No. 4 Group, 16 June 1942–1 April 1944
- Western Air Command, April 1944–7 August 1945

=== Stations ===
- Trenton, Ontario, 4 March 1936
- Jericho Beach, British Columbia, 5 November 1938
- Alliford Bay, British Columbia, 15 May 1940
- Coal Harbour, British Columbia, 23 April 1944–7 August 1945

=== Aircraft ===
- Canadian Vickers Vedette, 1936–1937
- Blackburn Shark Marks II and III, 1937–1941
- Supermarine Stranraer, 1941–1943
- Consolidated Canso A, 1943, 1944–1945
- Consolidated Catalina Marks IB and IIIA, 1943–1945
- Noorduyn Norseman, 1940–1941
