= No. 7 Squadron RCAF =

- Active: 1935-1939, 1941-1945
- Disbanded: 25 July 1945
- Country: Canada
- Branch: Royal Canadian Air Force
- Role: Bomber Reconnaissance
- Part of: RCAF Western Air Command
- Battle honours: Pacific Coast 1941-1945

Aircraft flown
- Patrol: Blackburn Shark Mk.III; Supermarine Stranraer; Consolidated Canso; Consolidated Catalina
- Transport: Fairchild 71; Bellanca Pacemaker

No. 7 (Bomber Reconnaissance) Squadron was a Royal Canadian Air Force squadron that was active during the Second World War.

It was amalgamated from various Rockcliffe based flights on 29 January 1936 at RCAF Station Rockcliffe near Ottawa, Ontario, as No. 7 (General Purpose) Squadron and was disbanded on 10 September 1939 to allow its personnel to bring more critical combat units up to strength with the start of the Second World War.

It was reformed at RCAF Station Prince Rupert on 8 December 1941 as an anti-submarine unit with RCAF Western Air Command. The squadron flew the Blackburn Shark, Supermarine Stranraer, Consolidated Canso and Consolidated Catalina before disbanding a final time on 25 July 1945.
