= Tofino =

Tofino Načiks
- District municipality
- District of Tofino
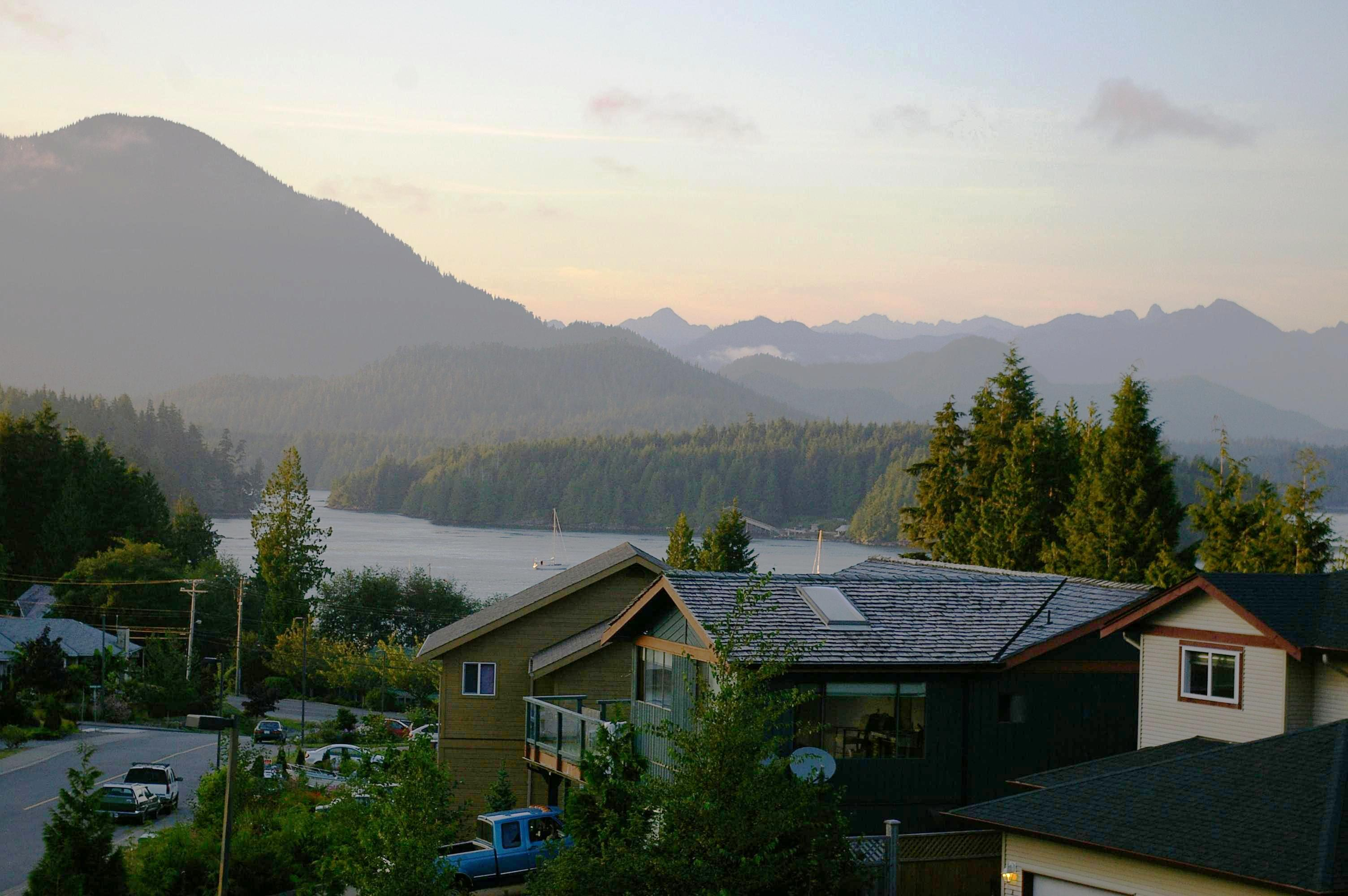
- View toward Meares Island in August 2005

- Location of Tofino Tofino (British Columbia) Tofino (Canada)
- Coordinates: 49°09′11″N 125°54′16″W
- Country: Canada
- Province: British Columbia
- Regional District: Alberni-Clayoquot
- Incorporated: 1932

Government
  - Mayor: Dan Law
  - MP: Gord Johns
  - MLA: Josie Osborne

Area
  - Total: 10.53 km^{2} (4.07 sq mi)
- Elevation: 10 m (33 ft)

Population (2021)
  - Total: 2,516
  - Density: 238.3/km^{2} (617/sq mi)
- Time zone: UTC−07:00 (PT)
- Postal code span: V0R 2Z0
- Area code: 250
- Climate: Cfb
- Website: tofinobc.ca

Tofino (/təˈfiːnoʊ/ tə-FEE-noh, Nuu-chah-nulth: Načiks) is a town of approximately 2,516 residents on the west coast of Vancouver Island in the Canadian province of British Columbia. The District of Tofino is located at the western terminus of Highway 4 on the tip of the Esowista Peninsula at the southern edge of Clayoquot Sound. It is situated in the traditional territory of the Tla-o-qui-aht First Nations, who have occupied Clayoquot Sound for thousands of years. European and American vessels began trading along this coast in the late eighteenth century, and permanent non-Indigenous settlement began in the 1890s; the community took the name Tofino, after nearby Tofino Inlet, in the early 1900s, and its post office opened in 1909. Tofino was incorporated as a municipality in 1932 and as a district in 1982.

A popular year-round tourism destination, Tofino's summer population swells to many times its winter size. It attracts surfers, hikers, nature lovers, bird watchers, campers, whale watchers and fishermen. Despite its small population, the town attracts a number of chefs and culinary professionals, which has resulted in a burgeoning choice of restaurants and specialty shops. In the winter, it is not as bustling, although many people visit Tofino and the West Coast to watch storms on the water. Close to Tofino is Long Beach, a scenic and popular year-round destination, in Pacific Rim National Park Reserve. With its natural hot springs, Maquinna Marine Provincial Park is a popular day-trip destination for tourists. Reachable by boat or floatplane, the park is located about 45 km (28 mi) north of Tofino.

Once a resource-based community sustained chiefly by fishing and logging, Tofino remained accessible only by air, water, or a gated logging road until a highway connection to the rest of Vancouver Island opened in 1959. The town gained international attention in the 1980s and 1990s as the focus of large-scale protests against old-growth logging in Clayoquot Sound, a dispute that contributed to the designation of the Sound as a UNESCO Biosphere Reserve in 2000. Since the 1990s, tourism has become Tofino's dominant industry, and the municipality received Resort Municipality status from the provincial government in 2008.

== Etymology ==
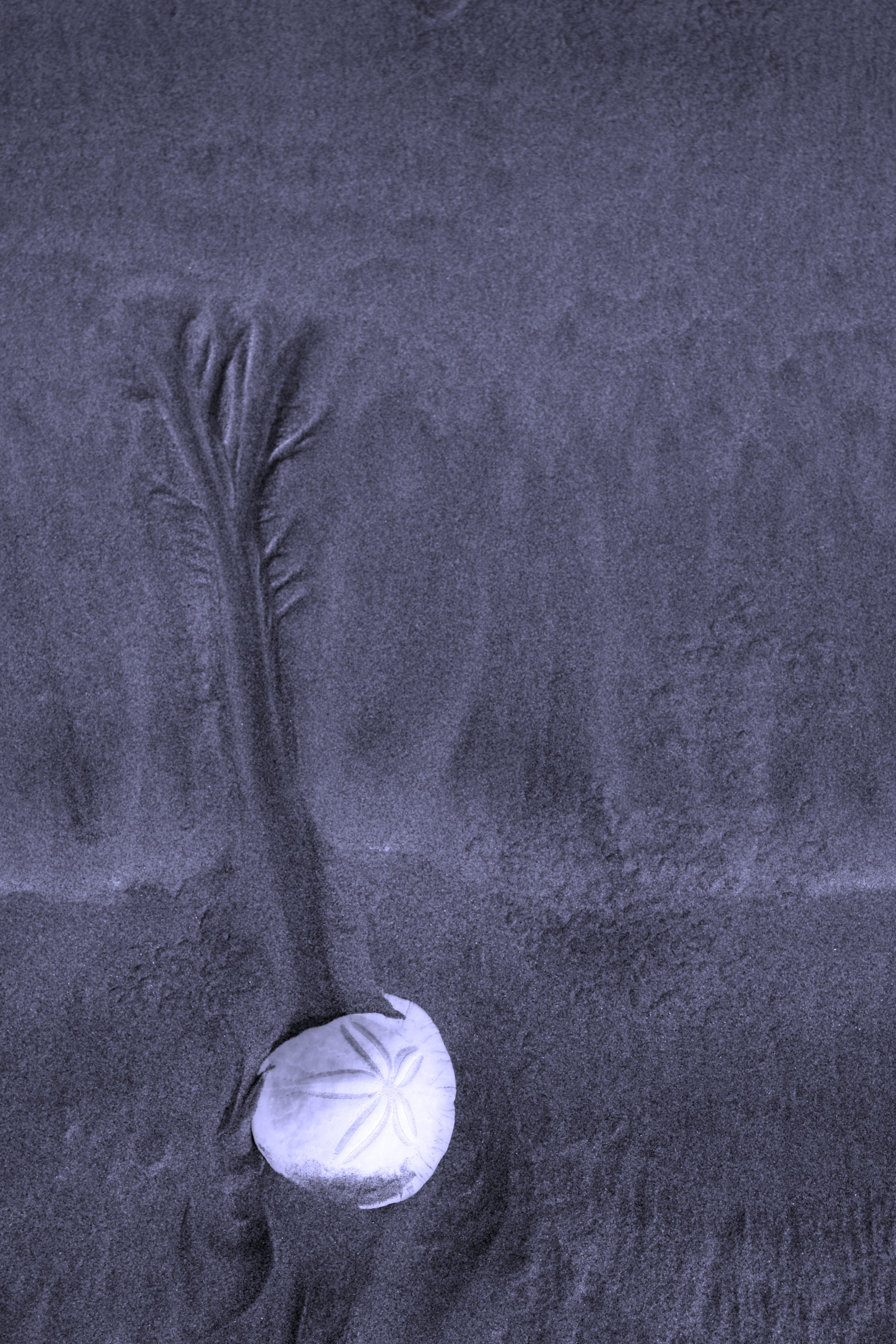
Sand dollar on a Tofino beach

The settlement acquired its name in 1909 with the opening of the Tofino Post Office, named after the nearby Tofino Inlet. This geographical feature had been named in 1792 by the Spanish explorers Galiano and Valdés, in honour of Admiral Vicente Tofiño de San Miguel y Wandewalle (or Vandewalle), under whom Galiano had learned cartography.

== History ==
=== Indigenous settlement ===
Tofino lies within the traditional territory of the Tla-o-qui-aht First Nations, one of the Nuu-chah-nulth peoples who have occupied Clayoquot Sound for thousands of years. The Tla-o-qui-aht formed through the amalgamation of smaller groups originally based around Kennedy Lake, and their territory came to encompass Tofino Inlet, the Esowista Peninsula, and Meares Island. The name "Esowista" is said to derive from a Tla-o-qui-aht war of conquest against the Esowistaht people, who once controlled the peninsula; the word translates as "clubbed to death". The principal Tla-o-qui-aht village, Opitsaht, sits directly across the harbour from present-day Tofino and is believed to have been continuously inhabited for at least 2,000 years, with Indigenous occupation of Clayoquot Sound dating back some 4,200 years. British trader John Meares reported visiting Chief Wickaninnish at Echachis in Clayoquot Sound in 1788 and seeing some 800 people gathered in a single longhouse.

=== European contact and early settlement ===
Spanish captain Juan Josef Pérez Hernández explored the area in 1774, and British captain James Cook arrived at Nootka Island in 1778, initiating a trade in sea otter pelts between the Nuu-chah-nulth and visiting European and American vessels. In 1792, Galiano and Valdés named nearby Tofino Inlet after Vicente Tofiño de San Miguel. British colonial agent William Banfield established a trading post at Stubbs Island, also known as Clayoquot, in 1854, forming the first permanent non-Indigenous settlement in the area. Further settlers arrived on the Esowista Peninsula from the 1890s onward, most of English, Scottish, and Norwegian descent. Surveyor T.S. Gore mapped the peninsula in 1895, assigning the lot numbers still used today. Settler John Grice, who had pre-empted land at the tip of the peninsula in 1893, had his property surveyed and subdivided for a future townsite in 1900, initially naming it "Clayoquot" after the older settlement across the harbour. To avoid confusion between the two "Clayoquots," the name "Tofino" gradually came into use; Father Charles Moser, the Roman Catholic missionary at Opitsaht, is recorded as the first to use the name in his diary, in 1904. A general store, telegraph office, and one-room school followed in the early 1900s, and the settlement's first church, St. Columba Anglican, was built by volunteers in 1913. A government dock was completed in 1908, along with a lifeboat station that remained a fixture of the community for decades.

=== Incorporation and the Japanese Canadian community ===
Tofino was incorporated as a municipality in 1932. From 1917 onward, Japanese Canadian fishermen, many originally from Steveston on the Fraser River, began fishing off the west coast of Vancouver Island in growing numbers. A residency requirement imposed by the federal Department of Fisheries in 1923 led around ninety Japanese Canadian fishermen and their families to settle permanently in the Tofino area, including clusters of homes on Stubbs Island, in Storm Bay, and on land near what is now known as the Eik Tree. By the 1930s, the Japanese Canadian community in Tofino numbered close to one hundred people, more than a third of the town's population, and was closely integrated into local social and economic life.

=== Second World War ===
Following Japan's attack on Pearl Harbor in December 1941, the federal government seized all fishing vessels owned by Japanese Canadians on the coast and, in January 1942, declared all persons of Japanese descent to be enemy aliens. On March 15, 1942, ninety-five Japanese Canadian residents of Tofino and Clayoquot were evacuated from the government wharf aboard the coastal steamer Princess Maquinna. During the war, the Royal Canadian Air Force constructed an air base, RCAF Station Tofino, near Long Beach, which operated from 1942 until 1944 and hosted more than 2,000 service personnel over the course of the war. No Japanese Canadians returned to live in Tofino after the war; in January 1947, the village's municipal council passed a resolution intended to exclude "orientals" from owning property or residing in the municipality, although no such bylaw was ever formally enacted. In 2019, Tofino's mayor issued a formal apology on behalf of the community for the town's treatment of Japanese Canadians during the war.

=== Post-war development and the road to Tofino ===
In the early 1950s, as part of the Cold War-era Pinetree Line early-warning network, a radar station operated on what is now known as Radar Hill from 1954 until its closure in 1958.

Until 1959, Tofino remained accessible only by air, water, or a rough logging road with locked gates. A gravel road connecting Tofino and Ucluelet to Port Alberni opened to public traffic on August 22, 1959, remained gated to daytime logging use until 1964, and was fully paved by 1972. The new road transformed the local economy, allowing fish and freight to be trucked to outside markets and drawing growing numbers of visitors to Long Beach. It also gave rise to a local surfing culture from the mid-1960s onward, and by the late 1960s a countercultural community of young people, sometimes numbering several hundred, had established itself in driftwood shelters at nearby Wreck (Florencia) Bay.

During the late 1960s and early 1970s, Tofino developed a growing reputation as a destination for young people seeking an alternative lifestyle. While Long Beach attracted increasing numbers of visitors, nearby Wreck (Florencia) Bay became a centre of Canada's counterculture. Beginning in 1968 and 1969, hippies, artists, Vietnam War draft dodgers, veterans, and other young travellers established a seasonal community of driftwood shelters and tents, drawn by the area's isolation and natural beauty. At its peak, as many as 500 people spent summers there.

The influx of young visitors transformed Tofino's image and generated mixed reactions among local residents. Many accepted the newcomers, giving hitchhikers lifts and helping them sell their artwork and crafts, while others viewed their unconventional appearance and lifestyle as harmful to the area's reputation and tourism industry. Despite these tensions, the countercultural community became one of the defining features of Tofino during the era, with its improvised driftwood homes, artistic expression, and relaxed lifestyle becoming widely associated with the community's identity. The area's growing popularity among young Canadians coincided with mounting concerns about overcrowding and environmental degradation along Long Beach, strengthening calls for greater protection of the coastline.

The creation of Pacific Rim National Park Reserve gained momentum during this period, with federal and provincial governments reaching an agreement in 1970 after years of lobbying. That same year, Prime Minister Pierre Trudeau visited Long Beach by helicopter to inspect the proposed park and famously tried surfing in the Pacific Ocean. After successfully standing on his surfboard during his first attempt, Trudeau joked with a long-haired young man who asked when marijuana would be legalized, replying, "You mean you need grass to get high on in this magnificent area?".

=== Pacific Rim National Park ===
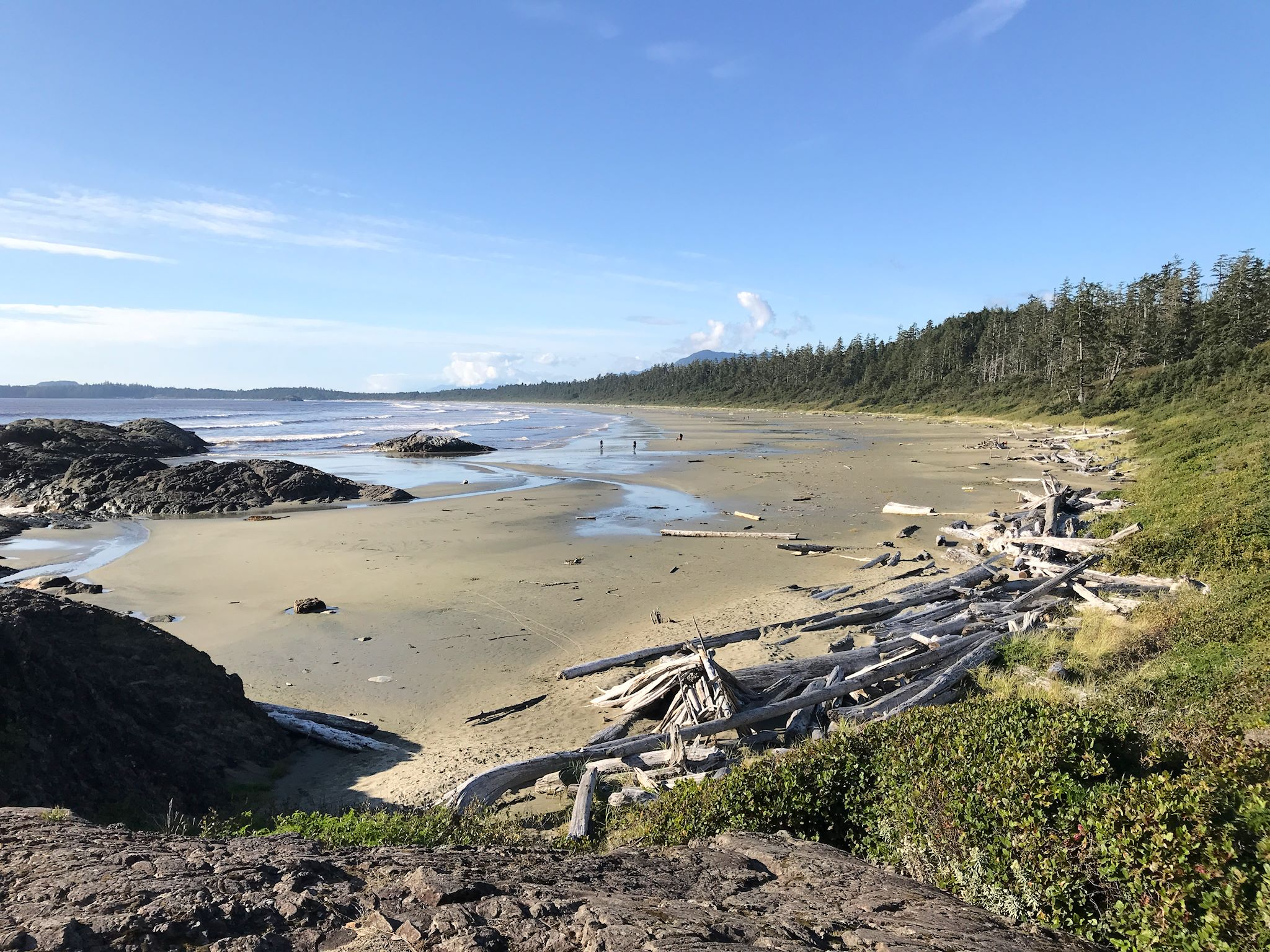
A shot of Long Beach near Tofino, which is a part of Pacific Rim National Park.

Following decades of lobbying, the provincial and federal governments agreed in 1970 to create a national park encompassing Long Beach, the Broken Group Islands, and the West Coast Trail. Pacific Rim National Park was officially opened on May 4, 1971, by Princess Anne. Between 1970 and 1975, homes, resorts, and other structures within the new park's boundaries, including the informal settlement at Wreck Bay, were expropriated and removed.

The establishment of Pacific Rim National Park Reserve did not reduce pressures on Long Beach. Instead, improved access, growing publicity, and the paving of British Columbia Highway 4 in 1972 led to a dramatic increase in visitor numbers. By Easter 1973, thousands of campers were occupying Long Beach and nearby beaches, while the May long weekend brought an estimated 10,000 visitors, widespread disorder, vehicle burnings, and RCMP intervention, prompting Parks officials to conclude that unrestricted beach use was no longer sustainable. Despite strong local opposition and concerns that tourism would suffer, the park prohibited beach camping and vehicle access in 1975. Rather than reducing tourism, the restrictions shifted development outside the park boundaries, fuelling rapid growth in accommodation and visitor services around Tofino.

=== Clayoquot protests ===
Tofino became the focus of major environmental protests over old-growth logging in Clayoquot Sound beginning in 1984, when the Tla-o-qui-aht First Nation declared Meares Island a Tribal Park to prevent the forestry company MacMillan Bloedel from logging it. The provincial government had granted MacMillan Bloedel permission in November 1983 to log 90% of Meares Island, and negotiations through the government-established Meares Island Planning Committee, formed in 1980, failed to produce a compromise before the company withdrew from talks. At a Meares Island Easter Festival held in Tofino on April 21, 1984, attended by some 600 people, Tla-o-qui-aht chief councillor Moses Martin declared the island a Tribal Park, and the carving Weeping Cedar Woman, by Godfrey Stephens, became a symbol of the campaign. A standoff at Heelboom Bay on Meares Island on November 21, 1984, in which a flotilla of boats and shoreline protesters blocked a MacMillan Bloedel crew boat from landing loggers, was followed by a court injunction, granted by the BC Court of Appeal in March 1985, that halted logging on the island pending resolution of Indigenous title claims brought by the Tla-o-qui-aht and Ahousaht First Nations. The dispute had lasting economic effects on Tofino, including the relocation of MacMillan Bloedel's local office and a bank branch to Ucluelet and an estimated 20% drop in local house prices.

Further confrontations followed elsewhere in Clayoquot Sound. In 1988, protesters blockaded logging-road construction by Fletcher Challenge at Sulphur Passage, near Shelter Inlet, resulting in the arrest of thirty-five people, including Ahousaht hereditary chief Earl Maquinna George; several protesters, among them Betty Krawczyk and Judith Robinson, served jail time at Oakalla Prison for defying court injunctions. In April 1991, protesters set fire to the Kennedy River Bridge to block access to a MacMillan Bloedel logging area, an act that idled over 200 loggers and was followed by the sinking of a company barge in Tofino Harbour. International Forest Products (Interfor) began operating in the Sound later that year, adopting smaller cutblocks and helicopter logging in an effort to reduce its environmental impact and avoid the publicity directed at MacMillan Bloedel. Through the early 1990s, environmental organizations including Greenpeace and the Sierra Club ran an international publicity campaign against BC logging practices, coining the term "Brazil of the North" for Clayoquot Sound and prompting European boycotts of forest products from the region.

Protests intensified through the following decade, culminating in the summer of 1993, after Premier Mike Harcourt's government announced the Clayoquot Sound Land Use Decision on April 13, 1993, permitting logging on 62% of the Sound. Thousands of demonstrators gathered at a peace camp, coordinated by Tzeporah Berman, near a former clear-cut close to Kennedy Lake, to blockade logging trucks at the Kennedy River Bridge each morning; by September of that year, 932 people had been arrested, then the largest mass arrest in Canadian history, with 309 people arrested in a single day on August 9, 1993. Supporters of the protest, including the Australian rock band Midnight Oil and American environmental lawyer Robert F. Kennedy Jr, drew additional media attention to the campaign, while the logging-industry-backed group Share BC organized counter-rallies in Ucluelet and later at the provincial legislature in Victoria. Most of those arrested were tried in mass proceedings before the BC Supreme Court, held in the theatre of the Royal BC Museum in Victoria beginning in August 1993, on charges of criminal contempt for violating logging-company injunctions.

The Clayoquot Sound protests, widely covered by international media, contributed to new provincial forest-practices standards and to the 1999 creation of Iisaak Forest Resources, a joint venture between MacMillan Bloedel and Nuu-chah-nulth interests. A nineteen-member scientific panel, established in October 1993 and chaired by Fred Bunnell, released recommendations in May 1995 calling for variable-retention forestry to replace clear-cutting in the Sound, and by 1997 logging levels had fallen to roughly a tenth of their 1991 volume. In March 1994, the provincial government signed an Interim Measures Agreement giving First Nations a role, including an effective veto, in land-use decisions for Clayoquot Sound pending treaty negotiations. In May 2000, Clayoquot Sound was designated a UNESCO Biosphere Reserve.

=== 21st century ===
Tourism has become the dominant sector of Tofino's economy since the 1990s, supplanting fishing and logging as the town's principal industries. Parks Canada estimated that some 769,308 visitors entered the Tofino area in 1993 alone, and by the mid-1990s an estimated 80% to 90% of local floatplane charter business catered to tourists rather than the resource industries. A wave of higher-end accommodation followed, beginning with the Middle Beach Lodge, opened on MacKenzie Beach in 1993, and the Wickaninnish Inn, which opened on Chesterman Beach in 1996 after a contested municipal rezoning process. The Clayoquot Wilderness Lodge opened at the mouth of the Bedwell River in 2000, and Long Beach Lodge opened at Cox Bay in 2002, further establishing the area as a destination for upscale wilderness tourism.

Local development has periodically provoked opposition. In 2002, plans to remove a pair of large old-growth red cedars, including the "Eik Tree," to make way for a condominium development led to the formation of the Tofino Natural Heritage Society and a twenty-eight-day tree-sit; the surviving tree was subsequently fitted with a metal support girdle anchored into bedrock. A separate proposal that year to build condominiums near Tonquin Park led residents to form the Tonquin Nature Reserve Committee, which purchased the land to prevent development.

The municipality received Resort municipality status from the provincial government in 2008. Rapid growth in visitor numbers has periodically strained local infrastructure; voters rejected a proposed $3.8-million upgrade to the town's water system in a June 2004 referendum, and in August 2006 a severe drought forced mayor John Fraser to declare a total water-use ban, requiring hotels and restaurants to close over the Labour Day long weekend before an emergency plan to truck in water from Ucluelet allowed businesses to reopen under continued restrictions. Subsequent federal, provincial, and municipal investment added new reservoirs and a treatment plant to the water system, including a 22.5-million-litre capacity reservoir on Meares Island. Tofino has continued to discharge untreated sewage into the ocean; estimated costs for a secondary treatment facility rose from roughly $18 million in 2013 to nearly $80 million by 2022, when construction began on a new wastewater treatment facility.

Surfing has grown into a significant part of the local tourism economy since the 1990s, with Tofino-raised competitors such as Raph Bruhwiler and Peter DeVries achieving international success and Jenny Hudnall's Surf Sister school, founded in 1999, helping to establish an unusually high proportion of women among local surfers.

The Sound's surrounding old-growth rainforest and the seasonal migration of grey whales through Clayoquot Sound remain among the area's principal tourist draws, with the region receiving several hundred thousand visitors annually. As of 2024, Tofino's tourism sector generated an estimated $657 million in economic output annually.

== Demographics ==
In the 2021 Canadian census, Tofino had a population of 2,516 living in 945 of its 1,205 total private dwellings, a change of 27.9% from its 2016 population of 1,967. With a land area of 10.56 km^{2} (4.08 sq mi), it had a population density of 238.3/km^{2} (617.1/sq mi) in 2021.

=== Religion ===
According to the 2021 census, religious groups in Tofino were:

- Irreligion (1,795 persons or 80.5%)
- Christianity (385 persons or 17.3%)
- Indigenous Spirituality (10 persons or 0.4%)
- Other (10 persons or 0.4%)

== Transportation ==
Tofino-Long Beach Airport (YAZ), 6 nautical miles (11 km; 6.9 mi) southeast of the town, is accessible to private and commercial aircraft. Floatplanes land on the inlet in town. Coastal fog is a common morning phenomenon in the summer, complicating access by air until the weather clears.

Tofino is located at the western end of Highway 4 that connects the community with Port Alberni and the population centres on the east coast of Vancouver Island. A monument in the city declares Tofino to be the western terminus of the Trans-Canada Highway as part of a 1940s campaign by local residents; the highway officially ends in Victoria at the terminus of Highway 1.

Water taxis connect Tofino with coastal communities such as Ahousat and Hot Springs Cove. Wildlife-watching tour boats operate in the area. In October 2015, a whale watching vessel capsized off the coast of Tofino, which resulted in the deaths of six passengers.

== Culture ==
=== Festivities and events ===
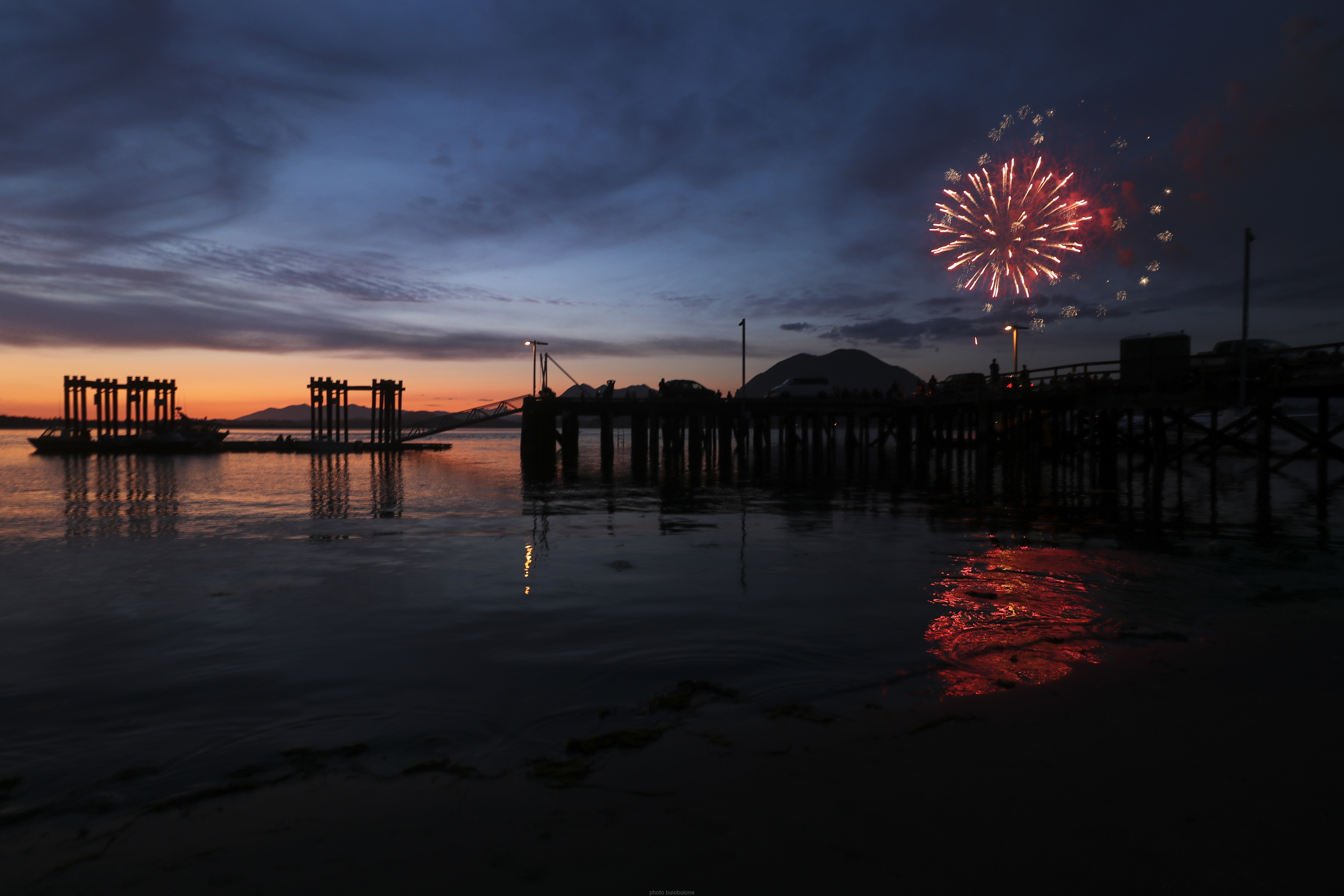
Fireworks on August 15 at the Tofino pier

Every March, the migration of thousands of grey whales is celebrated with the Pacific Rim Whale Festival. The last weekend of April has, up until 2020, been the Tofino Shorebird Festival. The first weekend of June, for 14 years, brought the Tofino Food and Wine Festival, featuring British Columbia wines and showcasing the creations of Tofino chefs. The Tofino Market takes place on the Village Green on every Saturday, from the Victoria Day long weekend through early October. The Tofino Lantern Festival (voted Tofino's most popular event by Tofino Time Magazine), was a Raincoast Education Society fundraiser each August, with its cancellation announced in 2021. Since 2018, early September has the week-long Race for The Blue Tuna Shoot-Out hosted by Tofino Resort + Marina, and Queen of the Peak Women's Surf Championship typically takes place toward the end of the month. In 2010, the O'Neill Coldwater Surf Classic took place on Cox Bay Beach, as the first professional ASP surf event ever held in Canada, with Tofino surfer Pete Devries winning the competition. November has typically hosted the Clayoquot Oyster Festival. Rip Curl Pro Tofino, the official Canadian surfing championship, has been held each year in May, since 2007.

=== Poole's Land ===
Poole's Land was an eco-village and a countercultural intentional community in Tofino on Vancouver Island in British Columbia, Canada, that existed between 1988 and 2020. Operated by founder Michael Poole, the community functioned as a popular tourist destination as well as a place of low-cost residence and accommodation, particularly for seasonal workers working over the summer months. Residents were encouraged to participate in a hippie lifestyle, living in camp-like conditions with an emphasis on sustainability and a community culture that espoused empathy as a core value and that was highly tolerant of soft drug use. Poole's Land came to an end due to a combination of dissatisfaction by local authorities, the failing health of its founder, and the COVID-19 pandemic paralysing operations.

=== Freedom Cove ===
Located within the Tofino vicinity is the man-made floating Island of Freedom Cove. Constructed by Wayne Adams and Catherine King in 1992, the mostly wooden structure is both home to Adams and King as well as a tourist attraction and an art gallery. Freedom Cove attempts to live as sustainably as possible by such means as by using solar power, recycling waste, composting, drinking rainwater, and eating locally grown or caught food.

== Climate ==
Pebble of the morning, on Long Beach in late summer, near Tofino

The climate is marine west coast (Köppen: Cfb, clearly included in the temperate zone). Precipitation is concentrated in the winter, which is a characteristic of Coastal British Columbia; however, the annual amount of 3,270.7 mm (128.77 in) far exceeds nearby areas. By comparison, Victoria, located only 203 km (126 mi) away, receives only 607.6 mm (23.92 in).

Proximity to the Pacific Ocean keeps temperatures cool in the summer and mild in the winter. Average high temperatures in the summer and winter are relatively stable and cool, coming in at 19.1 °C (66.4 °F) and 8.1 °C (46.6 °F), respectively. Compared to the Canadian city of Winnipeg, Manitoba, which rests on a similar latitude, Tofino's average high temperature is 6.8 degrees cooler in the summer and a whopping 19.4 degrees warmer in the winter.

During the cooler season, there is a lot of precipitation, with 492.1 mm (19.37 in) in November alone. Nearly all of the precipitation that falls throughout the year is rain, with 203 days with rain and only 7.8 days with snowfall. Due to its location on the westernmost part of Vancouver Island, Tofino faces the Pacific Ocean, unimpeded by any mountains to the west (and therefore not subject to a rain shadow effect like much of the eastern island and the BC interior). Winter cyclonic storms frequently pass over the town deluging it with rain, making it one of the wettest locations in Canada. The month of November alone brings more precipitation to Tofino than that received for an entire year in parts of the BC interior such as Kamloops and Penticton. Like the rest of coastal BC, summer brings relative dryness; even so, it still receives much more summertime precipitation than the interior (which can often be susceptible to drought-like conditions until the onset of autumn).

The highest temperature ever recorded in Tofino was 35.4 °C (95.7 °F) on June 28, 2021. The coldest temperature ever recorded was −15.0 °C (5 °F) on January 30, 1969.

Climate data for Tofino (Tofino-Long Beach Airport) Climate ID: 1038205; coordinates 49°04′56″N 125°46′21″W; elevation: 24.5 m (80 ft); 1981–2010 normals, extremes 1896–present (Note: Extreme high and low temperatures were recorded at Clayoquot from December 1896 to June 1943 and at Tofino Airport from July 1943 to present.)
Month	Jan	Feb	Mar	Apr	May	Jun	Jul	Aug	Sep	Oct	Nov	Dec	Year
Record high °C (°F)	20.1 (68.2)	19.4 (66.9)	24.4 (75.9)	24.4 (75.9)	29.4 (84.9)	35.4 (95.7)	33.9 (93.0)	32.8 (91.0)	29.4 (84.9)	25.6 (78.1)	21.1 (70.0)	19.4 (66.9)	35.4 (95.7)
Mean daily maximum °C (°F)	8.3 (46.9)	9.0 (48.2)	10.1 (50.2)	11.9 (53.4)	14.5 (58.1)	16.8 (62.2)	18.9 (66.0)	19.1 (66.4)	17.8 (64.0)	13.6 (56.5)	10.0 (50.0)	8.1 (46.6)	13.2 (55.8)
Daily mean °C (°F)	5.3 (41.5)	5.4 (41.7)	6.5 (43.7)	8.0 (46.4)	10.5 (50.9)	12.9 (55.2)	14.7 (58.5)	15.0 (59.0)	13.4 (56.1)	10.0 (50.0)	6.8 (44.2)	5.0 (41.0)	9.5 (49.1)
Mean daily minimum °C (°F)	2.3 (36.1)	1.9 (35.4)	2.7 (36.9)	4.0 (39.2)	6.5 (43.7)	8.9 (48.0)	10.5 (50.9)	10.8 (51.4)	9.0 (48.2)	6.3 (43.3)	3.6 (38.5)	1.9 (35.4)	5.7 (42.3)
Record low °C (°F)	−15.0 (5.0)	−11.1 (12.0)	−6.1 (21.0)	−3.3 (26.1)	−1.1 (30.0)	1.1 (34.0)	3.3 (37.9)	3.3 (37.9)	−0.6 (30.9)	−3.5 (25.7)	−12.7 (9.1)	−12.2 (10.0)	−15.0 (5.0)
Average precipitation mm (inches)	486.6 (19.16)	336.1 (13.23)	329.8 (12.98)	269.9 (10.63)	153.0 (6.02)	129.7 (5.11)	71.0 (2.80)	88.1 (3.47)	132.8 (5.23)	341.9 (13.46)	492.1 (19.37)	440.0 (17.32)	3,270.7 (128.77)
Average rainfall mm (inches)	477.4 (18.80)	327.3 (12.89)	325.7 (12.82)	269.2 (10.60)	153.0 (6.02)	129.7 (5.11)	71.0 (2.80)	88.1 (3.47)	132.8 (5.23)	341.8 (13.46)	489.4 (19.27)	432.0 (17.01)	3,237.2 (127.45)
Average snowfall cm (inches)	9.2 (3.6)	8.7 (3.4)	4.0 (1.6)	0.7 (0.3)	0.0 (0.0)	0.0 (0.0)	0.0 (0.0)	0.0 (0.0)	0.0 (0.0)	0.1 (0.0)	2.8 (1.1)	7.9 (3.1)	33.3 (13.1)
Average precipitation days (≥ 0.2 mm)	22.7	18.7	21.7	18.4	15.7	13.8	10.0	10.9	11.7	19.4	22.9	21.9	207.8
Average rainy days (≥ 0.2 mm)	22.1	18.4	21.5	18.4	15.7	13.8	10.0	10.9	11.7	19.4	22.6	21.6	205.9
Average snowy days (≥ 0.2 cm)	1.9	1.5	1.3	0.4	0.0	0.0	0.0	0.0	0.0	0.0	0.9	2.0	7.8
Average relative humidity (%)	83.6	76.7	75.6	73.2	71.3	71.7	71.7	74.8	73.2	79.3	82.9	84.6	76.5
Mean monthly sunshine hours	58.6	81.6	126.3	170.3	203.1	190.9	226.7	199.6	175.8	116.1	62.5	56.5	1,668.1
Percentage possible sunshine	21.7	28.5	34.3	41.5	42.9	39.4	46.4	44.8	46.4	34.6	22.7	22.0	35.4
Source: Environment and Climate Change Canada

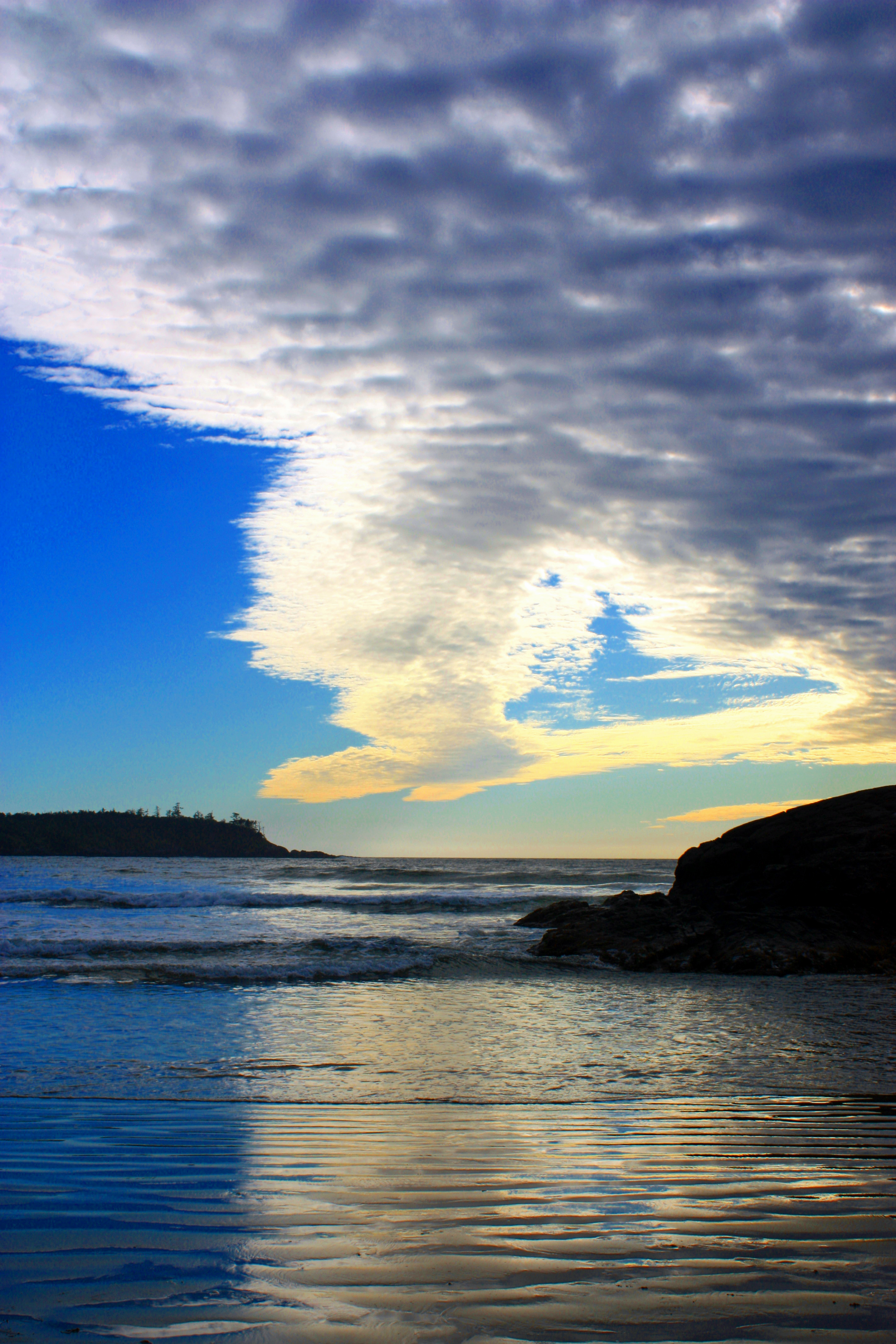
A cold front edge moving over Cox Bay

== Media ==
Tofino has one newspaper, the Tofino-Ucluelet Westerly News. Tofino Time is a monthly magazine that publishes local news and articles about Tofino and the surrounding areas. CHMZ-FM on 90.1 FM, nicknamed Tuff City radio, is a local radio station. Tofino also receives CBC Radio One via CBXZ-FM on 91.5 FM.

== Health and education ==
Public education is offered by the School District 70 Alberni, through the Wickaninnish Community School in Tofino and Ucluelet Secondary School in Ucluelet. The town's hospital is the Tofino General Hospital, operated by the Vancouver Island Health Authority (VIHA).

== Cultural references ==
=== Music ===
- Montreal third wave ska band The Planet Smashers recorded a song on their album Life of the Party entitled "Surfin' in Tofino".
- Canadian band Prairie Dance Club recorded a song entitled "Tofino".

=== Film and television ===
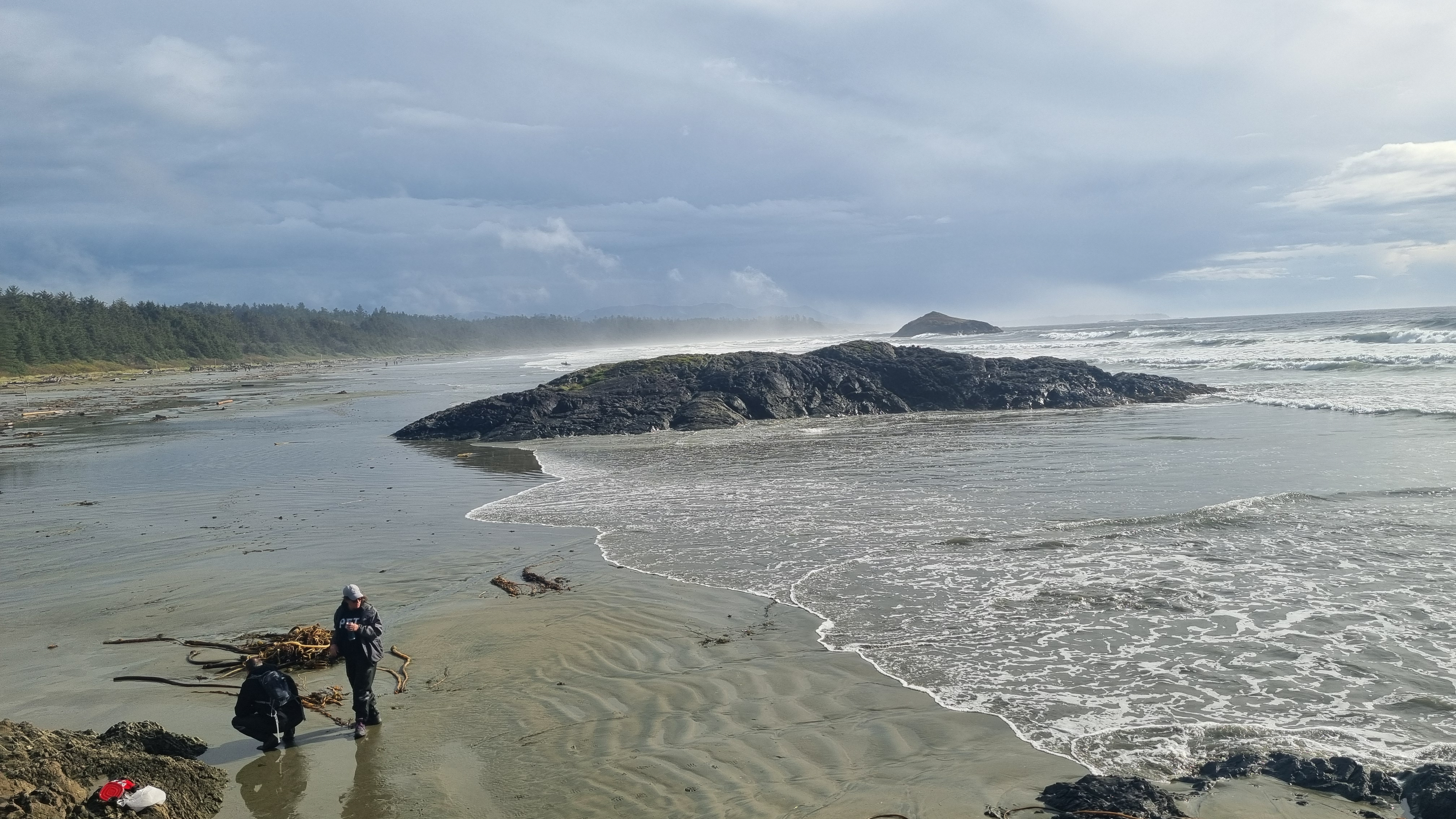
Looking south along Long Beach from Incinerator Rock

- Tofino was a filming location for The Twilight Saga: New Moon in March and April 2009. South Beach, located near Wickaninnish Beach inside Pacific Rim National Park Reserve, and Incinerator Rock at Long Beach were used.
- Tofino was also a filming location for the third instalment of the Planet of the Apes movie series, War for the Planet of the Apes. Long Beach and surrounding areas inside Pacific Rim National Park were used as filming locations.
- In the Canadian film One Week, main character Ben Tyler (played by Joshua Jackson) rides his motorcycle from Toronto, Ontario to Tofino, British Columbia.
- Tofino was one of the many filming locations for the movie The Big Year starring Jack Black, Owen Wilson and Steve Martin. It filmed several scenes in the town of Tofino at Schooner Restaurant and 4th Street dock in the harbour.
- Going the Distance, a 2004 teen comedy film with a group of friends going on a road-trip starting from Tofino beach heading to Toronto.

== Notable people ==
- Andrew Oye (born May 10, 1974), composer
- Sanoa Dempfle-Olin (born July 3, 2005), first surfer to compete for Canada at the Olympics

== See also ==
- List of francophone communities in British Columbia
