= Andrew Oye =

- Born: 10 May 1974 (age 51); Tofino, British Columbia, Canada
- Genres: Television composition
- Occupation: composer
- Years active: 2006–present

Andrew Oye (born May 10, 1974) is a Canadian composer from British Columbia, Canada.

== Biography ==
Oye was born in Tofino, BC. He began playing guitar at the age of 13. At the age of 18 he attended Malaspina College for jazz studies.

He recalls the first time watching Back to the Future as his reason for taking up guitar.

Since 2006 Oye has been writing production music for publishers in the US and Canada. He opened his own production library, DirectComposer.Com. Sonoma Wireworks wrote that Oye is an inspiration to anyone making music in their bedroom. From his home studio setup, Oye has had his music placed in shows such as Lost, CSI, American Horror Story, The Knick, Big Bang Theory, Pretty Little Liars, and Hawaii Five-O. Oye wrote the theme songs for the shows Tabloid and the 2012 Monday Night Football theme. An article by VIU University started with the line "If you watch some of the hottest shows on TV, you have likely heard the music of Andrew Oye."

Oye also has endorsements with Eve Audio, Presonus, and Whitfield, and Godin Guitars.
