= Poole's Land =

Commune on Vancouver Island

Coordinates: 49°07′59″N 125°53′44″W

Poole's Land was an eco-village and a countercultural intentional community in Tofino on Vancouver Island in British Columbia, Canada, that existed between 1988 and 2020. Operated by founder Michael Poole, the community functioned as a popular tourist destination as well as a place of low-cost residence and accommodation, particularly for seasonal workers working over the summer months. Residents were encouraged to participate in a hippie lifestyle, living in camp-like conditions with an emphasis on sustainability and a community culture that espoused empathy as a core value and that was highly tolerant of soft drug use. Poole's Land came to an end due to a combination of dissatisfaction by local authorities, the failing health of its founder, and the COVID-19 pandemic paralysing operations.

== History ==
Founder Michael Poole

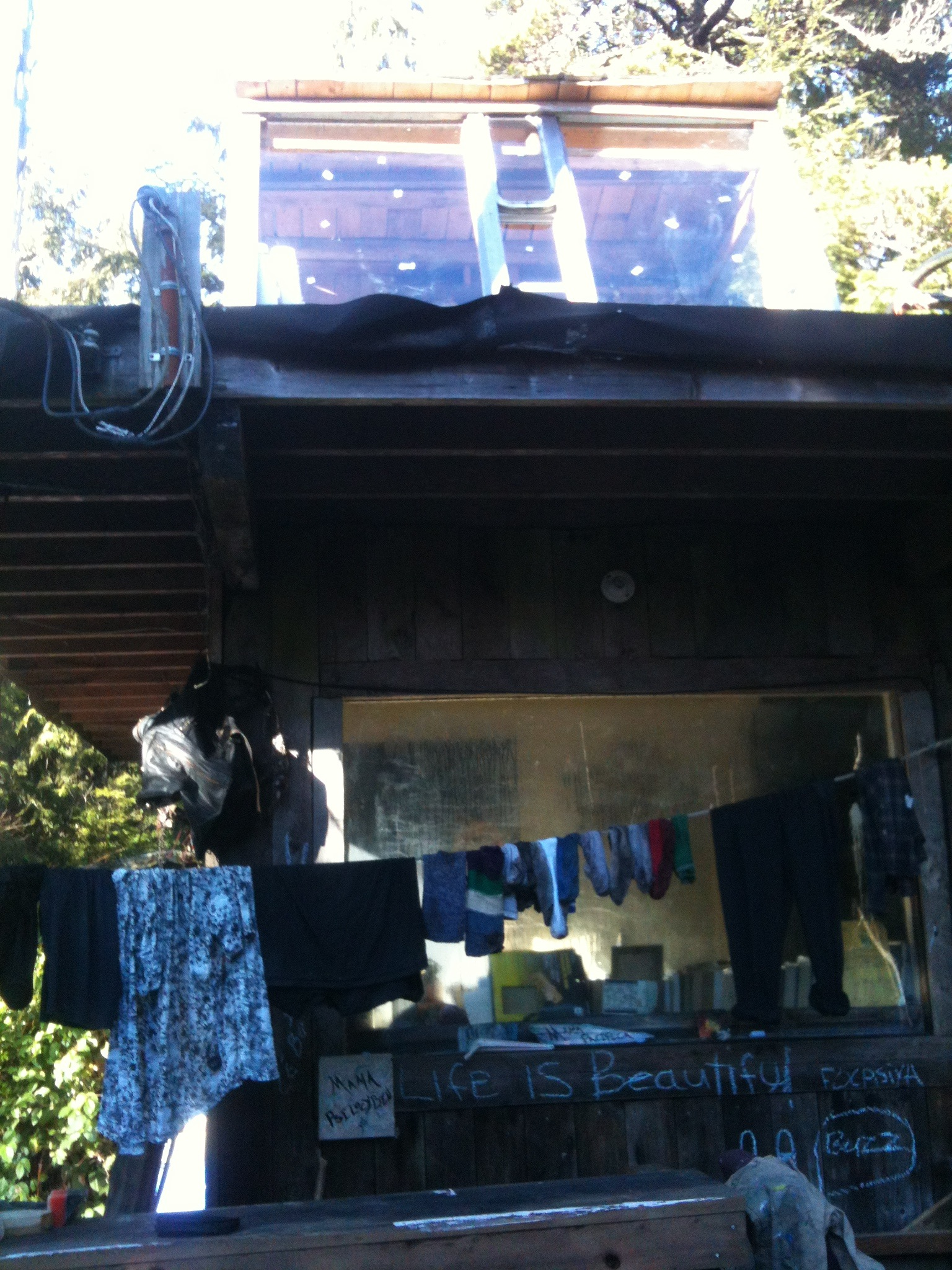
Communal kitchen and greenhouse used in Poole's Land

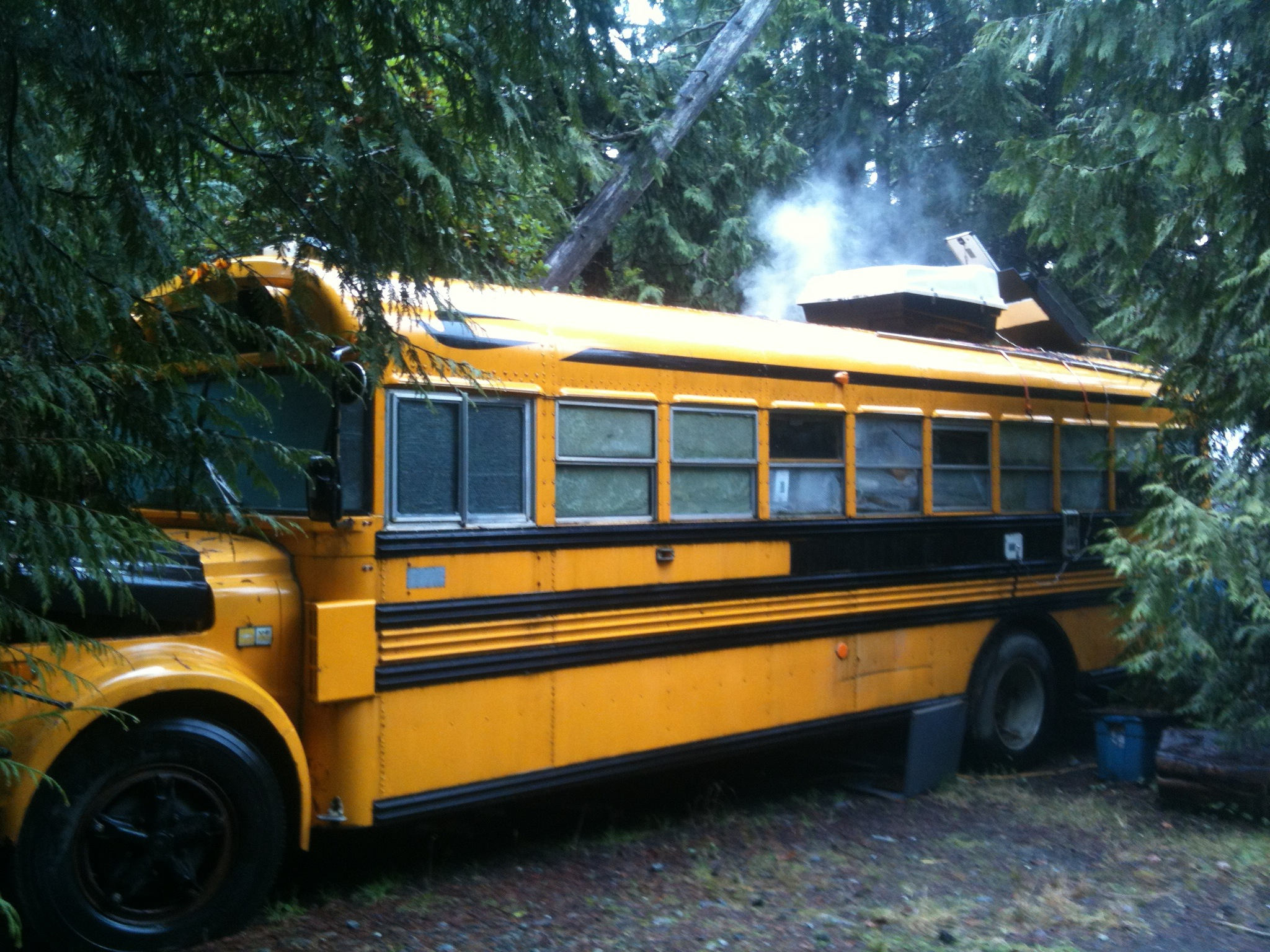
"The Magic Bus" – A school bus converted into a place of residence within Poole's Land

=== Origin ===
Poole's Land was created October 7, 1988, by Michael Poole when he purchased an 18-acre (7.3 ha) forested property in the area of Tofino, a small settlement on the west coast of Vancouver Island. It cost Poole $50,000 to purchase the site, and afterwards he had little funds remaining to develop it further. In keeping with his vision of creating a "communal living area free from any corporate structure", he began to offer accommodation on the site in exchange for labour. This formed the basis of what came to emerge on the site, a "hippie commune" often labelled as "anarchist", although Poole himself considered it more of a humanist venture.

In the summer of 1993 Tofino and the surrounding area was the epicentre for the Clayoquot protests, an organised environmental campaign against clearcutting in the Clayoquot Sound area of Vancouver Island. As the campaign escalated that summer, thousands of environmentalists arrived in the Tofino area to participate in the protests, many of whom came to temporarily stay on Poole's Land and helped establish its reputation and ethos.

=== Culture ===
If guests at Poole's Land were unable to afford to pay for accommodation at the site, they could instead volunteer their labour, such as working in a communal kitchen or in a communal garden. Labour could also be undertaken in exchange for a gift of drugs such as cannabis, magic mushrooms or LSD, the use of which was promoted by founder Poole as "herbal medicines". Other drugs such as cocaine and heroin were shunned by Poole and the community as destructive and addictive. One custom maintained by the camp was that the recruitment of a new resident to the commune would be celebrated by the smoking of cannabis from a peace pipe.

Residents cited the tolerant culture of the camp as one of the main benefits of living at the site. Community Member Michael Goodlife suggested the longevity of Poole's Land over similar communal living communities was due to the community not taking itself too seriously and emphasising the fun of living in the alternative lifestyle of the camp, as well as stating that he felt the camp's overall central philosophy was simply "empathy" and "taking care of the person next to you". Poole's Land practised permaculture, growing some of its own food and plants for its own communal consumption.

Residents of Poole's Land lived in camp-like settings, occupying tents, wooden cabins, treehouses, or tiny homes, many placed on the back of trailers in order to abide by local Tofino housing bylaws. Even the remains of a disused school bus (known as the Magic Bus; not the same bus in the photo) served as a place of residence. There was no on-site plumbing, with the community making use of outhouses and composting toilets for bathroom facilities and using the nearby Pacific Ocean to wash. Poole estimated that, in any given year, during the summer months there could be as many as 100 residents living simultaneously on Poole's Land.

Many Poole's Land residents were poor or even homeless as they arrived but often found work in the area as unskilled labour. Critics of Poole's Land associated the residents with criminality, but supporters suggested that the site offered some of the only affordable accommodation in the area during the summer, as all other accommodation in the town would be rented out to seasonal tourists, and thus was very important to the Tofino workforce. Many of those who sought out residency on Poole's Land also came with mental health issues, something Goodlife acknowledged but said he was committed to attempting to manage.

Poole's Land was a popular destination not just for prospective residents; it was estimated that approximately 20,000 tourists passed through the site in a 30-year period, despite the remoteness of its location.

=== Demise ===
In 2013 founder Poole was diagnosed with prostate cancer. This, coupled with a general feeling of being "burnt out" by 30 continuous years of running the community, resulted in Poole placing the property up for sale in 2018, hoping to secure a price of $2 million to $3 million. It was Poole's ambition to use these profits to purchase a 160-acre (65 ha) lot on nearby Long Beach in order "to solve the staff-accommodation problem and the homelessness".

By 2019, local authorities had begun to apply fines to Poole's Land for violating zoning bylaws, which in turn resulted in most of the permanent structures on the site having to be dismantled or destroyed. In the midst of the global COVID-19 pandemic, Poole's Land was declared "permanently closed" as of March 2020.

On June 25, 2020, Manisha Krishnan, a journalist from Vice magazine who had written a number of articles about Poole's Land as well as created a short documentary about it, wrote an article stating that Poole had died on June 16, 2020. He was 68 years old.

==== Legal dispute ====
Following the death of Michael Poole, legal possession of Poole's land was contested between his daughter Lilly Woodbury and a former romantic partner of Poole's, Sandra Gloria Varga. Varga claimed to be Poole's common law wife due to a purported relationship spanning between 2008 and 2015, and thus entitled to inherit Poole's Land following his death. However, In July 2023 a British Columbia Supreme Court Judge dismissed Varga's claim.
