= No. 9 Squadron RCAF =

- Active: 9 December 1941 - 1 September 1944
- Disbanded: 1 September 1944
- Country: Canada
- Allegiance: Canada
- Branch: Royal Canadian Air Force
- Role: Bomber Reconnaissance
- Part of: Western Air Command
- Battle honours: Pacific Coast 1941-1944

Insignia
- Unit Codes: KA (1939-1942), HJ (1942)

Aircraft flown
- Patrol: Supermarine Stranraer; Consolidated Canso; Consolidated Catalina

No. 9 Squadron RCAF was a Royal Canadian Air Force squadron active during the Second World War, primarily in an anti-submarine role with Western Air Command and was based at Bella Bella, British Columbia. The squadron flew the Supermarine Stranraer, Consolidated Canso and Consolidated Catalina before disbanding on 1 September 1944.
