= No. 4 Squadron RCAF =

- Active: 17 February 1933 - 7 August 1945
- Disbanded: 7 August 1945
- Country: Canada
- Branch: Royal Canadian Air Force
- Role: Flying Boat (FB)unit; General Reconnaissance (GR); Bomber Reconnaissance (BR)
- Part of: RCAF Western Air Command
- Battle honours: Pacific Coast 1941-1945

Aircraft flown
- Bomber: Blackburn Shark Mk.III
- Patrol: Canadian Vickers Vancouver Mk.II; Canadian Vickers Vedette; Supermarine Stranraer; Consolidated Canso A Consolidated Catalina Mk.IV
- Transport: Fairchild 71

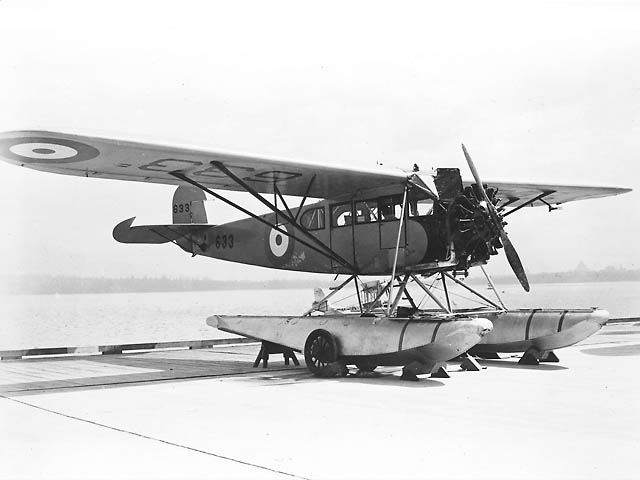
A Fairchild F.71B that was operated by 4 Squadron for coastal patrols in the late 1930s

No. 4 (Bomber Reconnaissance) Squadron was a Royal Canadian Air Force squadron that was active before and during the Second World War. It was formed on 17 January 1933 at RCAF Station Jericho Beach and flew civil operations until 1939, conducting forestry, customs and fishing patrols as well as aerial photography. On 1 January 1938, it was redesignated a General Reconnaissance squadron but continued with the same aircraft, but began training for war operations.

On 10 September 1939, the unit was mobilized for the war and redesignated again, this time as a Bomber Reconnaissance squadron, and it began carrying out anti-submarine patrols under the direction of Western Air Command while based out of RCAF station Tofino, in British Columbia. During the war, the squadron flew the Blackburn Shark, Supermarine Stranraer, Consolidated Canso and Consolidated Catalina before disbanding on 7 August 1945.

== Tofino Canso bomber crash ==
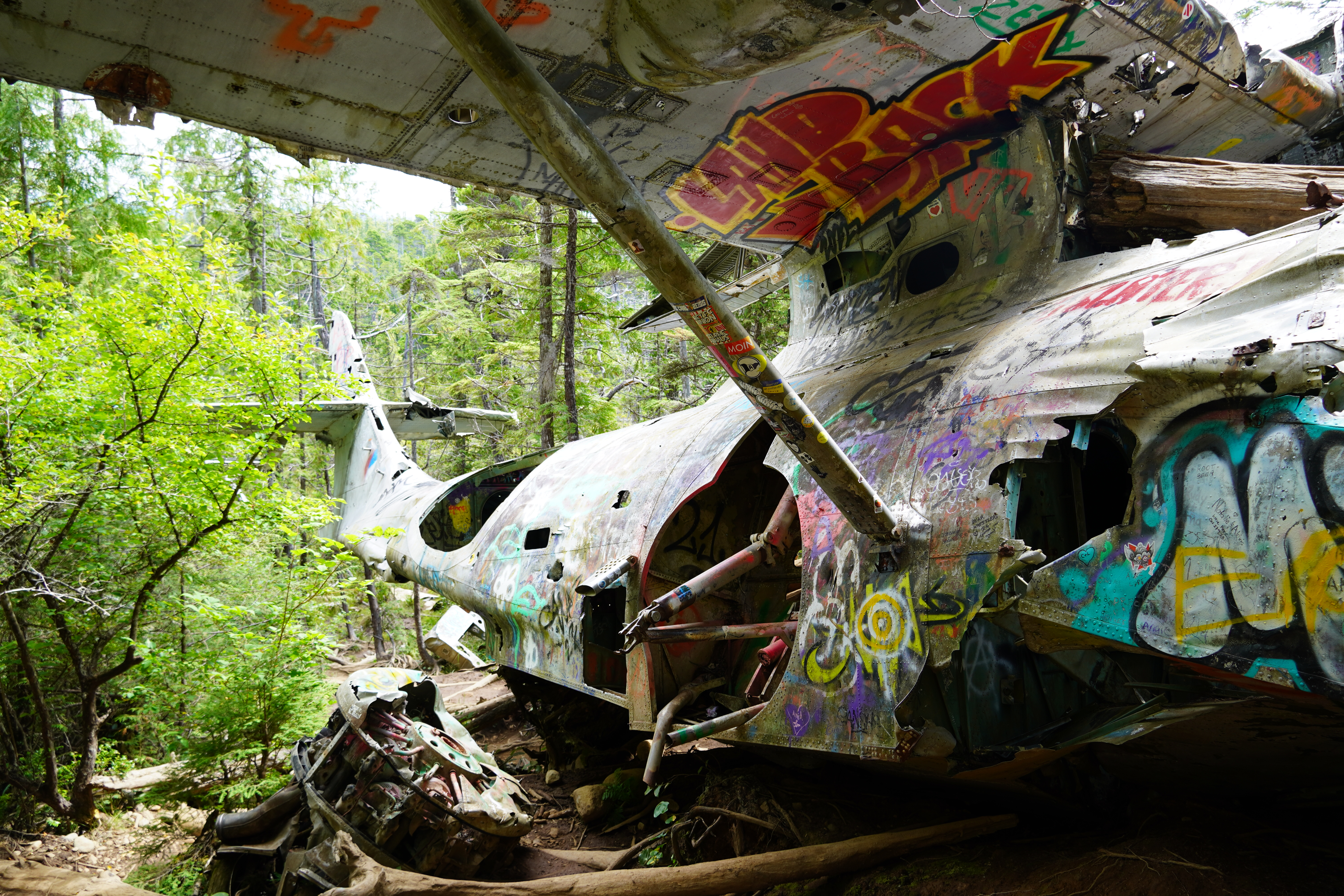
The crash site of Consolidated Canso 11007

On 8 February 1945, Consolidated Canso 11007 was departing RCAF Station Tofino on a routine night anti-submarine patrol of the coastline having been cleared for take-off at 2300 hours and had just passed the end of the runway when the port engine failed. The flight carried 12 personnel, 620 imp gal (2,800 L) of fuel and four 255 lb (116 kg) depth charges. While failing to gain altitude over a forested area the pilot attempted a 180-degree turn to return to the airfield, and impacted the side of a low hill. All on board survived with only minor injuries. Later, the RCAF retrieved all salvageable equipment including radios, radar equipment and machine guns, and detonated the depth charges, leaving a crater. The wreck is in a relatively easy to access location in National Park land (which precludes salvage) close to roads and is a popular destination for hikers despite most of the area being swampy.
