= Sinking of the Leviathan II =

2015 maritime incident in Canada

Capsizing of the Leviathan II
- Date: 25 October 2015
- Location: Off Vargas Island, Tofino, British Columbia, Canada; 49°11′6″N 126°5′7″W
- Cause: Struck by a rogue wave
- Participants: 27
- Deaths: 6

On October 25, 2015, the whale watching boat Leviathan II broached in the vicinity of Plover Reef off the coast of Vargas Island near Tofino, British Columbia, Canada. The 20 m (66 ft) vessel was struck by a breaking wave over the reefs and its sinking resulted in the deaths of 6 of its 27 passengers

The dead were identified as five men and one woman ranging in age between 18 and 76. Five were British citizens, though two were also Canadian residents, and the sixth was an Australian citizen. The Transportation Safety Board of Canada (TSB) said a large rogue wave flipped the ship after striking the rear starboard side. The TSB released its final report in June 2017 recommending changes to emergency safety practices. The TSB's recommendations included 1) Mandatory donning of PFD's for all passengers on all excursions, 2) that Transport Canada implement and oversee risk management guidelines, and 3) mandatory emergency beacons on seafaring vessels.

A plaque was later installed near the wharf in Tofino to commemorate those who died in the capsizing.
