= RCAF Station Tofino =

Former RCAF station in BC

- Part of Pinetree Line
- British Columbia, Canada

Site information
- Type: Radar Station
- Controlled by: Royal Canadian Air Force

Location
- Location within British Columbia
- Coordinates: 49°04′55″N 125°46′51″W

Site history
- Built by: Royal Canadian Air Force
- In use: 1943-1945; 1955-1958
- Fate: Radar Station -Demolished; Airfield - operated as Tofino Airport

Airfield information
- Identifiers: IATA: none, ICAO: none
- Elevation: 65 ft (20 m) AMSL
Runways
Direction	Length and surface
15/33	5,000 ft (1,500 m) Hard Surface
10/28	5,000 ft (1,500 m) Hard Surface
7/25	5,000 ft (1,500 m) Hard Surface

RCAF Station Tofino (ADC ID: C-36) was a Second World War and Cold War-era Royal Canadian Air Force Radar station located in British Columbia. It was located 6 nautical miles (11 km; 6.9 mi) southeast of Tofino, British Columbia, Canada.

== History ==
The site was developed during the early days of World War II and was opened in 1943 as a RCAF "Radio Detachment". The radar at the base was used to protect the Pacific coast from enemy attack. Due to the site's remote location it was equipped with its own airfield. The base was protected by a RCAF Squadron. The site was decommissioned in 1945. In 1955 the station was reopened again as a radar station in the Pinetree Line. The site was under the control of NORAD. The radar station was closed on 10 January 1958 and is now operated as the Tofino Airport.

== Aerodrome information ==
In approximately 1942 the aerodrome was listed as RCAF Aerodrome - Tofino, British Columbia at 49°05′N 125°46′W with a variation of 24.5 degrees east and elevation of 65 ft (20 m). The aerodrome was listed as "Under construction - Serviceable" with three runways as follows:

Runway name	Length	Width	Surface
15/33	5,000 ft (1,500 m)	150 ft (46 m)	Hard surfaced
10/28	5,000 ft (1,500 m)	150 ft (46 m)	Hard surfaced
7/25	5,000 ft (1,500 m)	150 ft (46 m)	Hard surfaced

== Squadrons ==
- No. 4 Squadron RCAF - anti-submarine unit under Western Air Command 1941–1945
- No. 132 Squadron RCAF - fighter unit under Western Air Command 1943–1944; disbanded at Sea Island in 1944
- No. 133 Squadron RCAF - fighter unit under Western Air Command spent time in Tofino
- No. 52 Aircraft Control & Warning Squadron - Pinetree Line 1955–1958
