= RCAF Station Jericho Beach =

Former air station in Vancouver, British Columbia, Canada

Coordinates: 49°16′18″N 123°11′59″W

RCAF Station Jericho Beach, originally known as the Vancouver Air Station, was one of the first Canadian air stations opened by the Canadian Air Board. Jericho Beach is located in Vancouver, British Columbia.

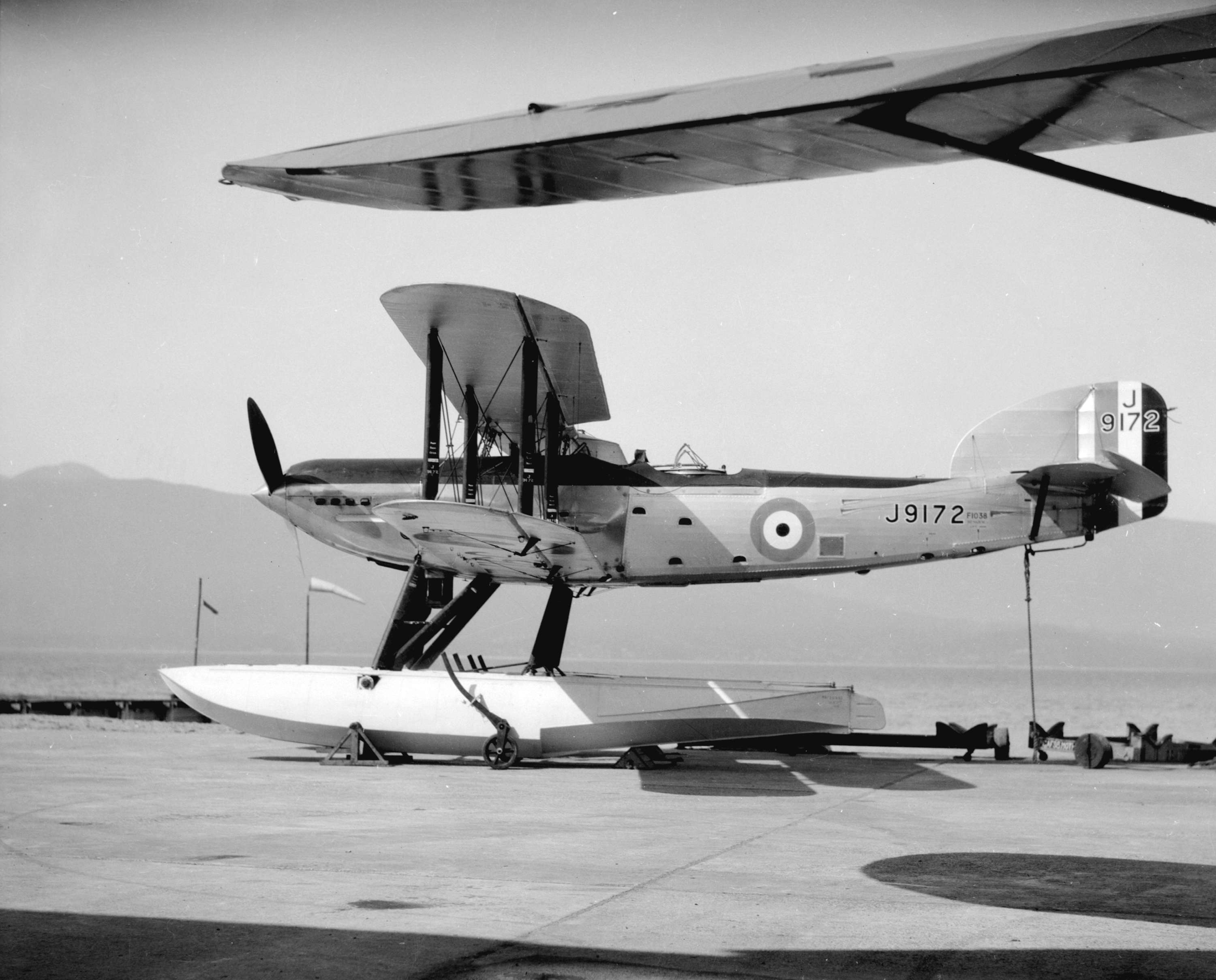
Fairey III being tested at Jericho Beach in 1930.

== History ==
The Vancouver Air Station was one of five stations established by the Canadian Air Board's Flying Operations Branch during its first summer of operations in 1920. Its location at Jericho Beach was on government-owned land which had been declared a naval reserve in 1859, but had been logged and used as a golf course since 1889. The establishment of the station was authorized on 14 February 1920 and construction began in June of that year. The first Curtiss HS-2L aircraft, shipped from the Dartmouth Air Station by rail, was assembled and test flown on 24 September 1920. Various survey, patrol, and transportation flights were flown on behalf of other government departments that fall.

In 1921, Vancouver was second only to High River in number of hours flown among Canadian air stations. The station operated several HS-2L flying boats and a single Felixstowe F.3 on a variety of missions including forest fire patrol, forestry survey, anti-smuggling patrol, fisheries patrol, and transportation in remote areas. In 1922, a permanent hangar and fuel tank were built at the station. Major Clarence MacLaurin, who had helped select the site and been superintendent of the station since its establishment, was killed in an HS-2L crash on 11 September 1922.

Following the cancellation of part-time training for military pilots on 31 March 1922, the Air Board restructured its flying operations, merging the Flying Operations Branch into the Canadian Air Force in June. Changes to the organization of the air stations were deferred to the fall to avoid administrative issues during the flying season. On 25 November 1922 the Vancouver Air Station was renamed CAF Unit Vancouver and the civilian personnel were commissioned or enlisted into the Canadian Air Force. The name changed again when the Canadian Air Force was granted the royal prefix effective 13 March 1923, becoming RCAF Unit Vancouver, then RCAF Station Vancouver in early October. None of these changes, nor the official formation of the Royal Canadian Air Force on 1 April 1924, substantially altered the role of the station.

In 1923, the majority of the station's flying was "preventive patrols" to counter smuggling and illegal fishing. With the passage of the Eighteenth Amendment to the United States Constitution, patrols were required to combat rum-running in addition to narcotics smuggling. On behalf of the Department of Marine and Fisheries, an HS-2L was detached to Prince Rupert to spot vessels fishing illegally. The station also began conducting experimental flights to capture samples of white pine blister rust to analyze airborne transmission patterns for the Department of Agriculture. The same year the station became the RCAF's main center for seaplane conversion training for pilots trained on landplanes at Camp Borden. For 1924 the station's aircraft consisted of two HS-2Ls and a Vickers Viking.

In July 1925, retroactive to 1 April, all the RCAF's civil operations stations were re-designated as numbered squadrons, with Vancouver becoming No. 1 (Operations) Squadron. The majority of flying time that year was dedicated to fisheries patrol, with 3 HS-2Ls detached to Casey Cove near Prince Rupert for much of the summer and a single aircraft to Bamfield for the same purpose in the fall. In 1926 fisheries patrol operations were curtailed by budget cuts.

On 1 July 1927 the RCAF's civil operations were transferred to the new Directorate of Civil Government Air Operations (CGAO). The reorganization left Camp Borden and Vancouver as the only military air stations in Canada and No. 1 (Operations) Squadron again became RCAF Station Vancouver. Nos 4 and 5 squadrons, for training and service respectively, were authorized to form at Vancouver but were never organized in practice. The station instead retained a small staff to provide seaplane training.

By 1928 the last HS-2L flying boats had been replaced by Avro 504N floatplanes for seaplane training. In 1930, responsibility for administrative and supply support to No. 1 Photographic Detachment was transferred to Vancouver from High River. No. 1 PD had been conducting photographic survey along the British Columbia coast using Fairchild FC-2 floatplanes each summer since its formation in 1928 and was disbanded at the end of 1931. By 1931 the station's fleet of training seaplanes included de Havilland Gipsy Moths, Canadian Vickers Vedettes, Canadian Vickers Vancouvers, a Consolidated Courier, and the Canadian Vickers Vista.

In May 1932 No. 11 (MP) Detachment was formed at Bamfield to assist the Royal Canadian Mounted Police in combatting rum-running, and in 1933 No. 1 General Purpose Detachment was assigned to Vancouver on photographic survey duties.

In the spring of 1934 RCAF Station Vancouver and its two detachments (Nos. 1 and 11) were re-organized into No. 4 (Flying Boat) Squadron, which had been authorized to form at Vancouver effective 17 February 1933. No. 4 Squadron began training in Royal Air Force coastal reconnaissance tactics using the Vickers Vancouvers in addition to the civil duties inherited from its detachments.

Effective 1 April 1937, a station headquarters for RCAF Station Vancouver was again authorized, with No. 4 Squadron and No. 3 Repair Depot (authorized to form at Jericho Beach on the same date) as subordinate units.

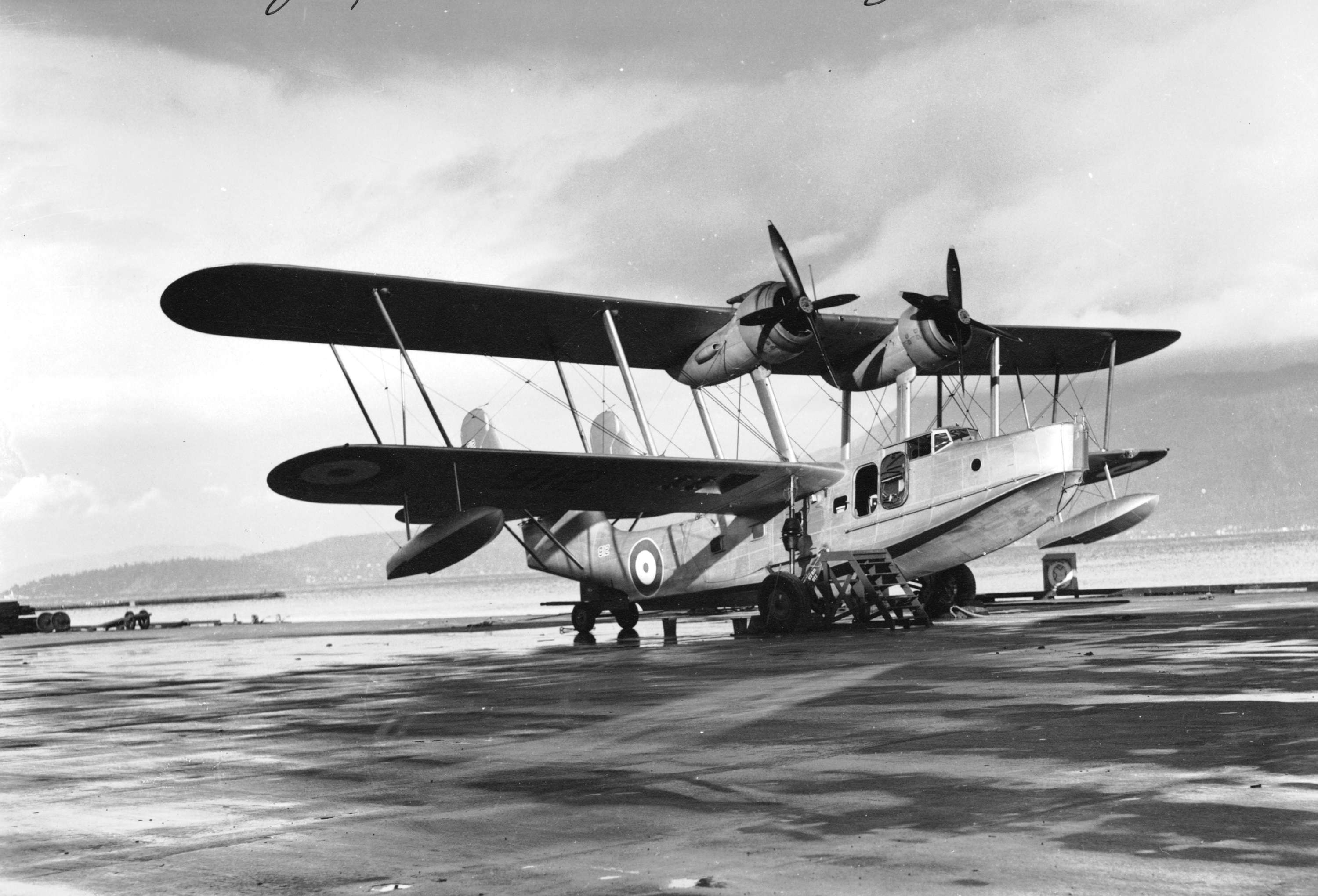
Supermarine Stranraer at Jericho Beach circa 1942.

By 1940, the seaplane squadrons had moved to RCAF Station Sea Island, and No. 3 Operational Training Unit (OTU) began operations, training aircrew on flying boats. No. 3 Repair Depot was also established in 1940, and along with No. 3 OTU, would remain until 1945.

In 1942 the army's Pacific Command Headquarters moved to Jericho Beach, and in 1947, the army took control of the station. There remained, however, a small RCAF presence. Over the years, the station hosted many other army and Canadian Forces units. Most of the base facilities were transferred to the City of Vancouver in 1969, and the area renamed "Jericho Park."

Jericho Beach detachment was closed in 1996. Most of the base's buildings, including the old flying boat hangars, have been taken down. The few that remain and are being used for non-military purposes.

== See also ==
- Jericho Beach
