= Supermarine Stranraer =

British flying boat introduced in 1937

Stranraer
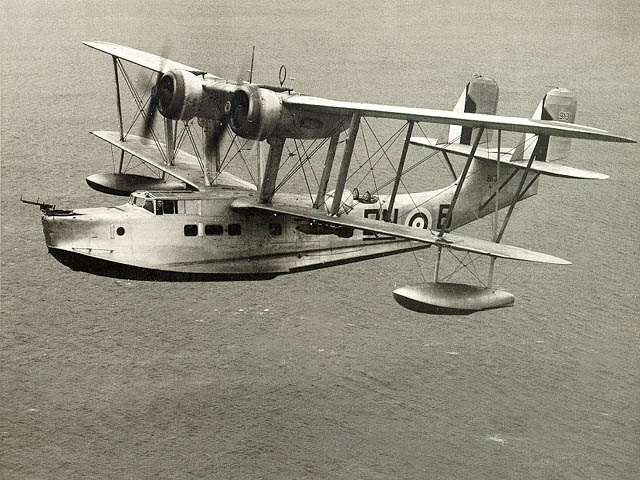

General information
- Type: Maritime reconnaissance
- National origin: United Kingdom
- Manufacturer: Supermarine
- Designer: R. J. Mitchell
- Primary users: Royal Air Force Royal Canadian Air Force
- Number built: 57

History
- Manufactured: 1937–1939
- Introduction date: 1937
- First flight: 24 July 1934
- Retired: 1943 (military use); 1958 (civilian use)
- Developed from: Supermarine Scapa

The Supermarine Stranraer is a flying boat designed and built by the British Supermarine Aviation Works company at Woolston, Southampton. It was developed during the 1930s on behalf of its principal operator, the Royal Air Force (RAF). It was the RAF's last and fastest biplane flying boat. Derived from the Supermarine Scapa, the aircraft's design was heavily shaped by Specification R.24/31, issued in 1931. After an initial rejection by the Air Ministry, Supermarine persisted with development as a private venture under the designation Southampton V. During 1933, a contract was placed for a single prototype; it was around this time that the type was named after Stranraer. First flown on 24 July 1934, the Stranraer entered frontline service with the RAF during 1937; most examples of the type were in service by the outbreak of World War II.

The Stranraers typically undertook anti-submarine and convoy escort patrols during the early years of the conflict. During March 1941, the model was withdrawn from frontline service, but continued to be operated in a training capacity until October 1942. In addition to the British-built aeroplanes, the Canadian Vickers company in Montreal, Quebec, also manufactured 40 Stranraers under licence for the Royal Canadian Air Force (RCAF). These Canadian Stranraers served in anti-submarine and coastal defence capacities on both Canada's Atlantic and Pacific coasts, and were in regular service until 1946. Following their withdrawal from military service, many ex-RCAF Stranraers were sold off to fledgling regional airlines, with whom they served in various commercial passenger and freighter operations into the 1950s.

== Design and development ==
=== Background ===
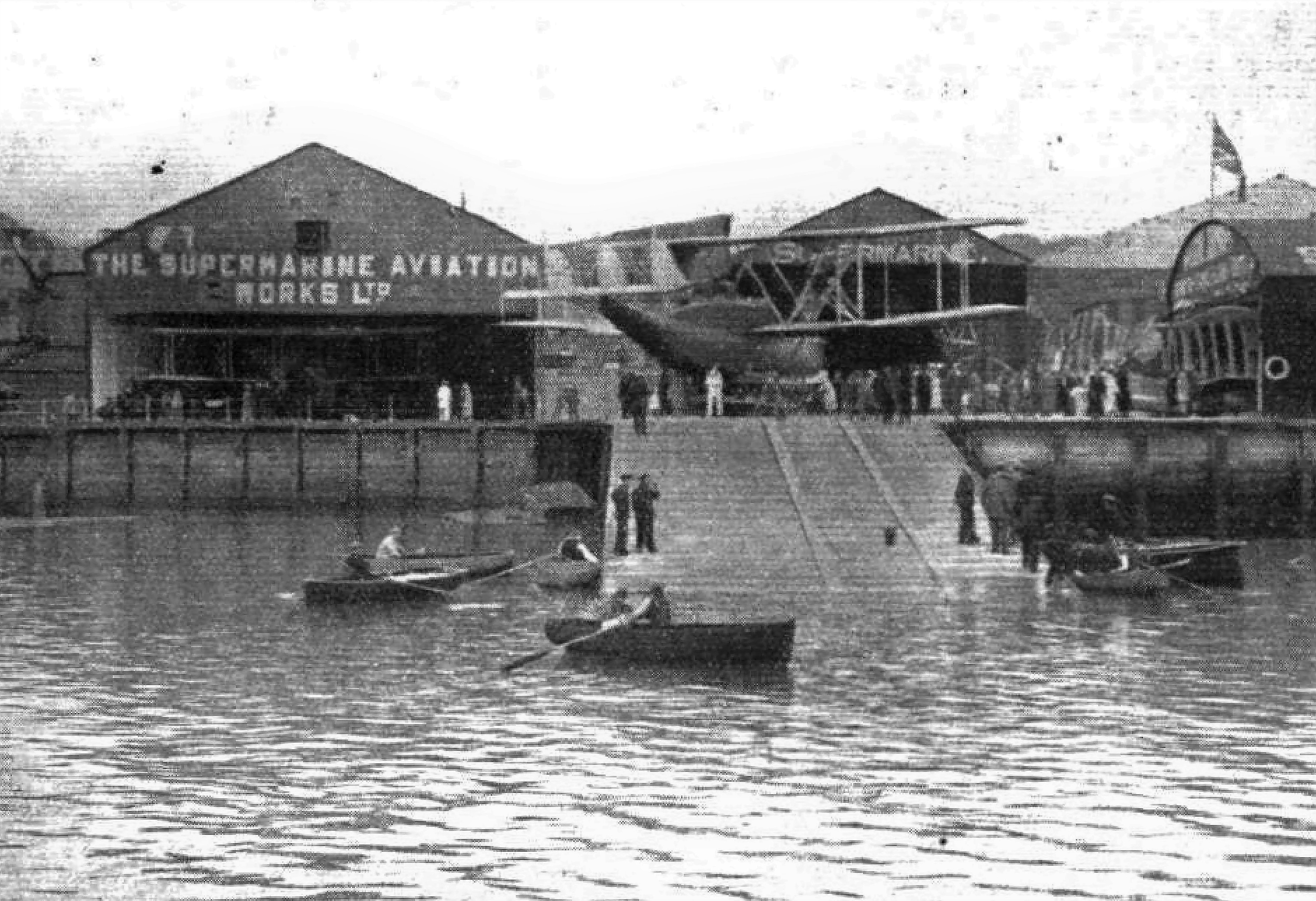
Supermarine's works at Woolston, Southampton

The Supermarine Stranraer, which was directly derived from the Supermarine Scapa, was the final aircraft in a series of flying boats designed by R. J. Mitchell for the Royal Air Force (RAF). The Stranraer was produced by Supermarine at its works in Woolston, Southampton, with deliveries taking place between 1937 and 1939. Development of the series began during the early 1930s, with Supermarine's design team headed by Mitchell. The project was pursued as a response to the Air Ministry's issuing of Specification R.24/31 in 1931, which called for a general purpose coastal reconnaissance flying boat for the RAF.

This specification demanded a payload 1,000 pounds (450 kg) greater than that of the Scapa and the ability to maintain level flight on only a single engine, which the Scapa could not do. Supermarine's initial response to the specification was a larger model of the Scapa; the company competed against a bid from Saunders-Roe. The Air Ministry favoured Saunders-Roe's proposal and rejected Supermarine's design. Despite this, Supermarine chose to continue development work on the design as a private venture, which was first known as the Supermarine Southampton V.

=== Prototypes and production ===
In 1933 a contract was placed for a single prototype powered by two 820 horsepower (610 kW) Bristol Pegasus IIIM engines, and the type was named the Stranraer. On 24 July 1934, the first prototype, K3973, made its maiden flight, piloted by Joseph Summers. Over the following months, a relatively intense initial flight test programme was conducted. On 24 October 1934 it was delivered to the Marine Aircraft Experimental Establishment (MAEE) at RAF Felixstowe for official trials.

On 29 August 1935, soon after the completion of proving flights, an initial order for 17 aircraft (serial numbers K7287 to K7303) was placed by the Air Ministry to fulfil Specification 17/35; six more aircraft (K9676 to K9681) were ordered in May 1936, but this order was subsequently cancelled. The first production standard aircraft made its first flight in December 1936, and entered service operation with the RAF on 16 April 1937. The final Stranraer was delivered on 3 April 1939. In addition, a total of 40 Stranraers were manufactured under licence in Canada by Canadian Vickers Limited, as both Supermarine and Canadian Vickers were subsidiaries of Vickers-Armstrongs.

== Description ==
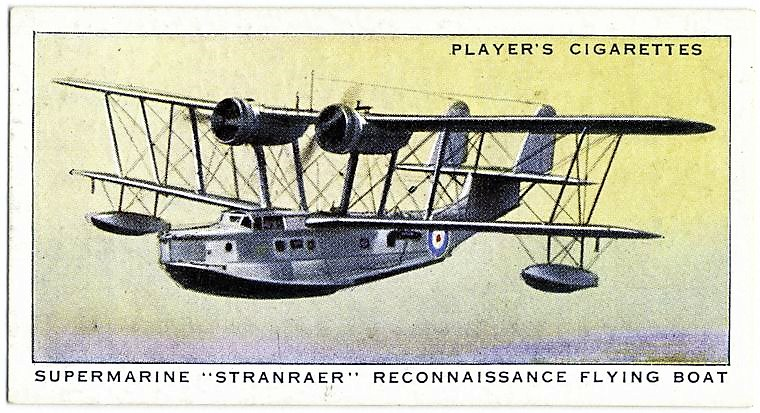
A 1935 cigarette card depicting the Supermarine Stranraer

The Stranraer was a twin-engined biplane flying boat accommodating a crew of 6–7. Its empty weight was 11,250 pounds (5,100 kg), with a maximum take-off weight of 19,000 pounds (8,600 kg). As the design of the Stranraer progressed, it was changed from that of the Scapa, having a two-bay structure. The Stranraer's weight, and the surface area and span of its wings, were 12 per cent greater; the elevator was also 7 per cent larger, while the rudders featured trim tabs capable of holding the aircraft straight under single-engine flight. The moderately supercharged Bristol Pegasus IIIM radial engine was selected. Much of the airframe was alclad, while detailed fittings were made of stainless steel; metal components were anodised as an anti-corrosion measure.

For additional strength, a second pair of interplane struts were added. The hull was considerably larger, its cross-section being increased by 18 per cent, yet it had identical hydrodynamic performance. The forward gun was redesigned to be retractable, the middle gunner's position was lowered, and a tail gunner position was added just aft of the control surfaces, completed with a hooded windshield. In general, the equipment of which the aircraft was to be fitted with were the result of lessons learnt from operations of the earlier Southamptons. The production model of the Stranraer differed in a few ways from the first prototype, chiefly of which was the use of the more powerful 920 horsepower (690 kW) Pegasus X engine. The engines were placed in nacelles under the upper wing, so that the propellers were well clear of any sea spray.

Two petrol tanks, each of 250 imp gal (1,100 L) capacity, were placed in the centre section of the upper wing; petrol was fed by gravity, but fuel pumps were also incorporated. The two-bladed wooden propellers of the prototype were replaced by three-bladed metal Fairey-Reed propellers when the aircraft went into production. The wing structure was redesigned to have two bays. The Stranraer was armed with three 0.303-inch (7.7 mm) Lewis guns, positioned in the nose, dorsal and tail. The aircraft could carry up to 1,000 pounds (450 kg) of bombs.

== Operational history ==
=== Military use prior to September 1939 ===
The Stranraer and its contemporary, the Saro London, were the last multi-engine, biplane flying-boats to see service with the RAF. The RAF operated 17 Stranraers from 1937, although they were already considered obsolete when they entered service. (Note: They were ordered by the RAF in August 1935, the month the name was changed to Stranraers.) Before the war, the type served primarily with No. 228 Squadron, No. 209 Squadron and No. 240 Squadron. Generally, the aircraft was not well-received, with numerous pilots considering its performance being typically marginal.

Others noted that it had superior seaworthiness to several aircraft in common use, such as the Consolidated PBY Catalina. As early as 1938, some Stranraer squadrons had begun to re-equip themselves with other aircraft, such as the Short Sunderland and Short Singapore flying boats. Early on in its career, Stranraers made several challenging long-distance flights; one such flight, covering 4,000 miles (6,400 km), was performed during a single exercise during September 1938.

RAF Stranraers SOC ("struck off charge") before September 1939
| Serial | Delivered | Fate | Notes |
|---|---|---|---|
| K3973 | October 1934 | SOC (30 October 1938) | Prototype, became obsolete |
| K7288 | September 1937 | Hit the sea on night exercise, caught fire and sank (28 March 1938) | 6 killed |
| K7297 | September 1938 | Lost over the North Sea (19 August 1939) | 6 killed |

=== Second World War ===
No Stranraers saw action away from British territorial waters during the war. Immediately following the outbreak of the war in September 1939, Stranraers patrolled the North Sea, intercepting opposing shipping between Scotland and Norway. Aircraft assigned to such duties were typically armed with bombs underneath one wing and an overload fuel tank underneath the other one. Use of the Stranraer for such patrols came to an end on 17 March 1941. Stranraers saw service with No. 240 Squadron, and limited numbers were deployed at the No. 4 (Coastal) Operational Training Unit. The final Stranraer flight in RAF service was conducted by K7303 at Felixstowe on 30 October 1942.

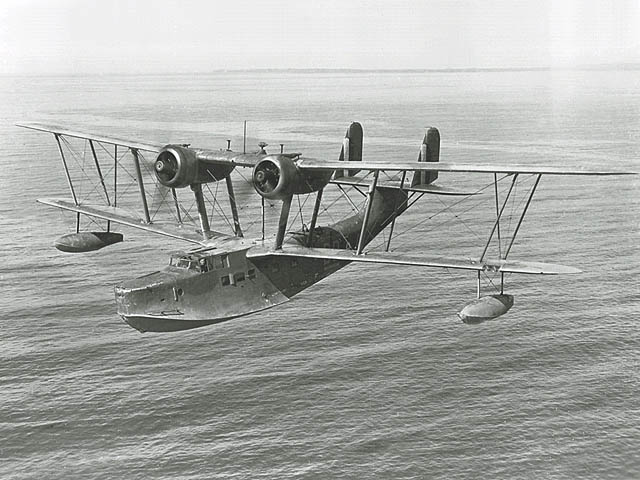
RCAF Stranraer in wartime camouflage

Having acquired a less than favourable reception by flight and ground crews alike, the Stranraer gained a large number of derisive nicknames during its service life. It was sometimes referred to as a "whistling shithouse" because the toilet opened out directly to the air and when the seat was lifted, the airflow caused the toilet to make a whistling sound. The Stranraer also acquired "Flying Meccano Set", "The Marpole Bridge", "Seymour Seine Net", "Strainer", "Flying Centre Section of the Lion's Gate Bridge", as well as a more genteel variant of its usual nickname, "Whistling Birdcage".

The Royal Canadian Air Force (RCAF) Stranraers were exact equivalents of their RAF counterparts. In Canadian service, they were usually employed in coastal patrol against submarine threats in a similar role to the British Stranraers. Aviation author Dirk Septer stated that no enemy action was ever recorded by the RCAF's Stranraers. However, the crew of a 5 Squadron Stranraer, flown by Flight Lieutenant Leonard Birchall, were responsible for the capture of an Italian merchant ship, the Capo Nola, in the Gulf of Saint Lawrence, hours after Canada issued its declaration of war on Italy on 10 June 1940. (Note: Flight Lieutenant Birchall had been tasked with locating any Italian vessels still in Canadian waters as war became imminent. On 10 June, he located the Capo Nola, which had recently departed from Quebec. Birchall had been informed of the declaration of war by radio and so made a low pass over the freighter, as if making an attack. This panicked the captain into running his vessel aground against a sandbank. Birchall then touched down nearby and waited until Royal Canadian Navy vessels reached the scene. The Capo Nola's crew were the first Italian prisoners taken by the Allies during the war.) The Canadian Vickers-built Stranraers served with the RCAF throughout the war, the last example being withdrawn on 20 January 1946.

RAF Stranraers SOC or destroyed 1939–1942
| Serial | Delivered | Fate | Notes |
|---|---|---|---|
| K7287 | April 1937 | SOC (25 June 1941) | |
| K7289 | December 1937 | unknown after June 1941 | |
| K7290 | January 1938 | Sank in gale (21 November 1940) | |
| K7291 | June 1938 | Hit by light boat and sank (10 November 1940) | |
| K7292 | February 1938 | SOC (13 May 1941) | |
| K7293 | March 1938 | Sunk in gale (17 February 1941) | |
| K7294 | May 1938 | Damaged beyond repair after hitting the water (3 November 1939) | |
| K7295 | July 1938 | Damaged beyond repair after hitting the water (4 September 1942) | |
| K7296 | August 1938 | SOC (22 September 1939) | |
| K7298 | September 1938 | Crashed into the sea (12 June 1941) | 9 killed |
| K7299 | October 1938 | SOC (4 April 1941) | |
| K7300 | November 1938 | Sank in gale (20 October 1941) | |
| K7301 | December 1938 | Sank in gale (21 August 1940) | |
| K7302 | January 1939 | Sank in gale (20 October 1941) | |
| K7303 | April 1939 | SOC (31 October 1942) | |

=== Civilian use ===
From May 1935, the Stranraer was developed for civilian use into the Type 237. Approximately 20 of the 40 RCAF Stranraers survived the war intact enough for potential reuse. Of these, 13 were sold to civilian operators through Crown Assets after the end of hostilities, with registrations in Canada and the US. Several were converted to Super Stranraer configuration with 1,200 horsepower (890 kW) Wright GR-1820-G202GA engines replacing the original Pegasus units.

After the end of the war, several examples served with Queen Charlotte Airlines (QCA) in British Columbia, operating until 1958. Queen Charlotte Airlines became at one point the third-largest airline in Canada; it was popularly known as the Queer Collection of Aircraft. With limited money, it flew a mixture of types that were often the cast-offs of other operators. In QCA use, the Stranraer gained a more suitable reputation and was "well liked" by its crews. A total of eight surplus Stranraers were also sold to Aero Transport Ltd. of Tampa, Florida.

== Operators ==
=== Military ===
Canada

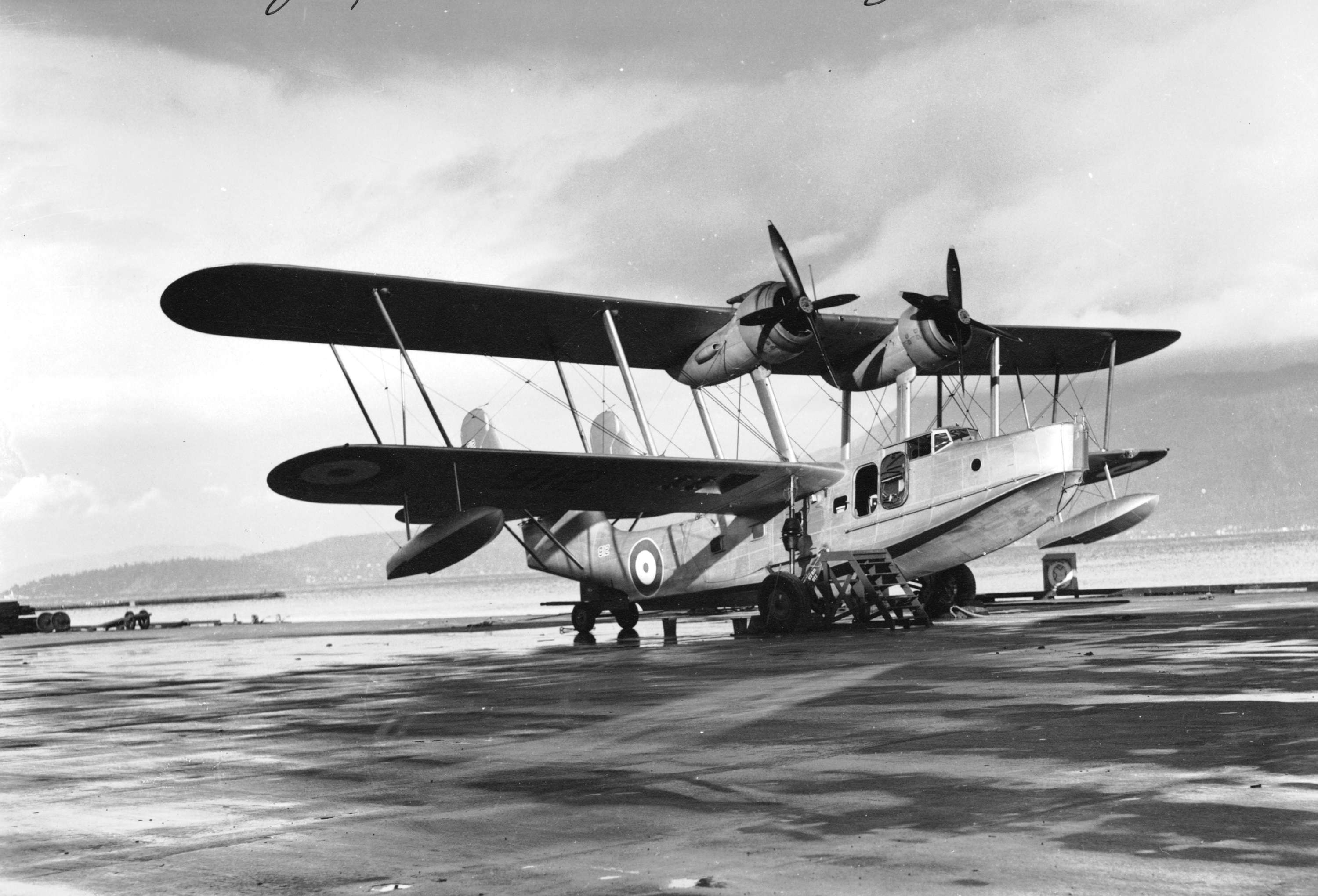
Supermarine Stranraer 912 of the RCAF at RCAF Station Jericho Beach

- RCAF – Operational Squadrons of the Home War Establishment (HWE) (Based in Canada)
  - Eastern Air Command
    - No. 5 Squadron RCAF Used Supermarine Stranraer (Nov 38 – Sep 41)
    - No. 117 Squadron RCAF Used Supermarine Stranraer (Sep 41 – Oct 41)
  - Western Air Command
    - No. 4 Squadron RCAF Used Supermarine Stranraer (Jul 39 – Sep 43)
    - No. 6 Squadron RCAF Used Supermarine Stranraer (Nov 41 – May 43)
    - No. 7 Squadron RCAF Used Supermarine Stranraer (Feb 43 – Mar 44)
    - No. 9 Squadron RCAF Used Supermarine Stranraer (Dec 41 – Apr 43)
    - No. 13 (OT) Squadron RCAF Used Supermarine Stranraer (Oct 41 – Nov 42)
    - No. 120 Squadron RCAF Used Supermarine Stranraer (Nov 41 – Oct 43)
    - (OT)-Operational Training;

United Kingdom

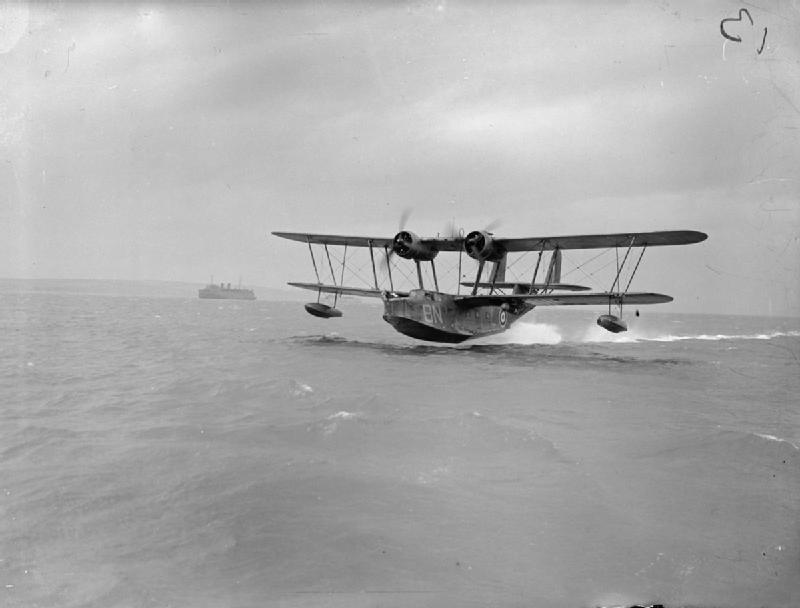
A Stranraer Mark I of No. 240 Squadron RAF landing on Loch Ryan

- Royal Air Force
  - No. 201 Squadron RAF
  - No. 209 Squadron RAF
  - No. 210 Squadron RAF
  - No. 228 Squadron RAF
  - No. 240 Squadron RAF

=== Civilian ===
United States

- Aero Transport Ltd.

Canada

- Pacific Western Airlines
- Queen Charlotte Airlines
- Wardair

== Specifications ==
Data from Supermarine Aircraft since 1914, Database: Supermarine Stranraer

General characteristics

- Crew: 6–7
- Length: 54 ft 9 in (16.69 m)
- Wingspan: 85 ft 0 in (25.91 m)
- Height: 21 ft 9 in (6.63 m)
- Wing area: 1,457 sq ft (135.4 m^{2})
- Empty weight: 11,250 lb (5,103 kg)
- Gross weight: 19,000 lb (8,618 kg)
- Powerplant: 2 × Bristol Pegasus X nine-cylinder air-cooled radial piston engines, 920 hp (690 kW) each
- Propellers: 3-bladed variable-pitch metal propellers

Performance

- Maximum speed: 165 mph (266 km/h, 143 kn) at 6,000 ft (1,800 m)
- Alighting speed: 58.5 mph (50.8 kn; 94.1 km/h)
- Cruise speed: 105 mph (169 km/h, 91 kn)
- Range: 1,000 mi (1,600 km, 870 nmi) at 105 mph (91 kn; 169 km/h) and 5,000 ft (1,500 m)
- Service ceiling: 18,500 ft (5,600 m)
- Rate of climb: 1,350 ft/min (6.9 m/s)
- Time to altitude: 10,000 ft (3,000 m) in 10 minutes
- Wing loading: 13 lb/sq ft (63 kg/m^{2})
- Power/mass: 0.097 hp/lb (0.159 kW/kg)

Armament

- Guns: Three × 0.303 in (7.70 mm) Lewis guns
- Bombs: 1,000 lb (454 kg) of bombs or depth charges on external racks under the mainplanes

Eight × 20 lb (9 kg) bombs housed in internal bays in the lower mainplanes

== Surviving aircraft ==
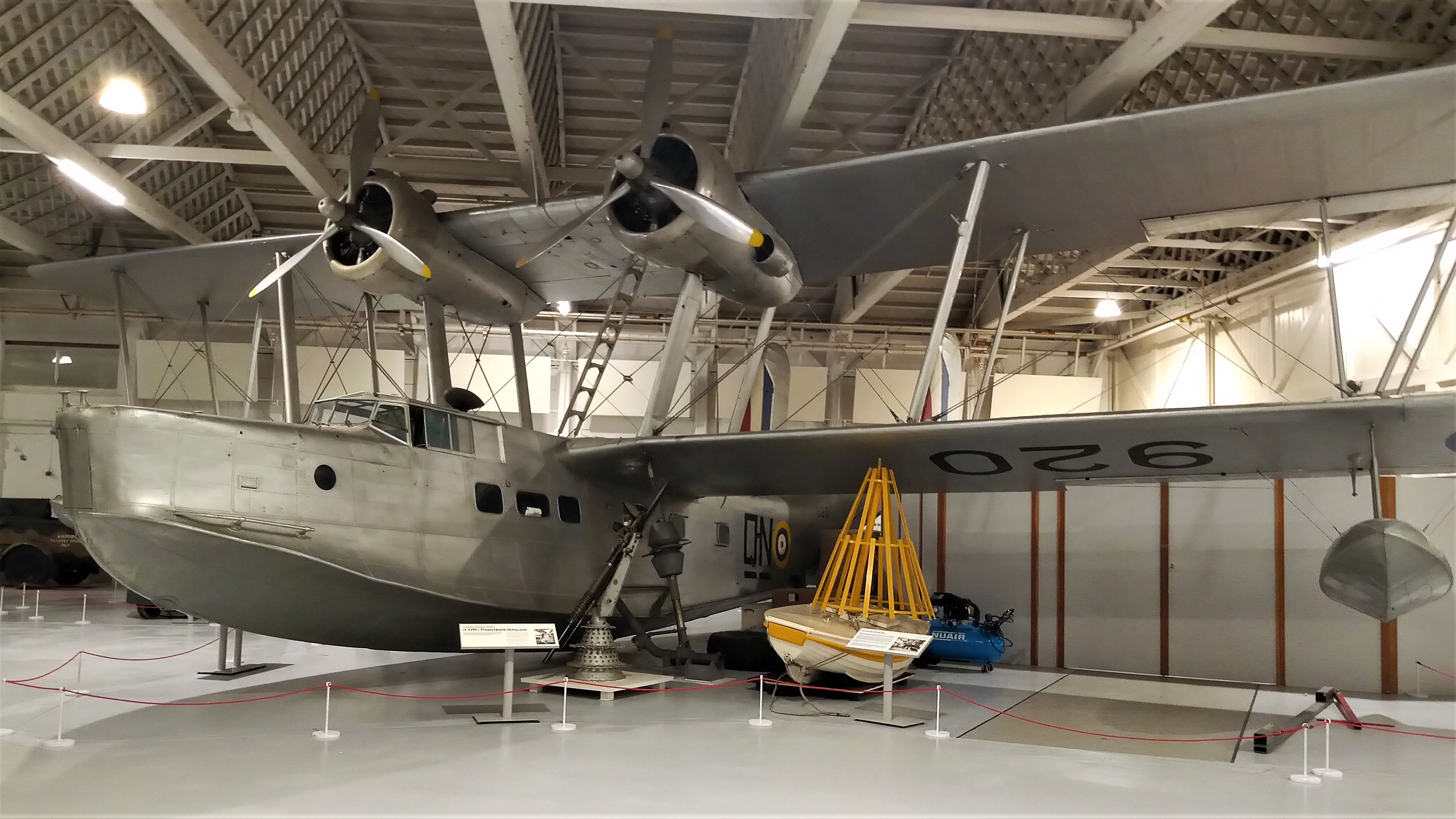
The only surviving Supermarine Stranraer, on display at the RAF Museum London, 2021

A Stranraer, 920/CF-BXO, survives in the collection of the Royal Air Force Museum London. This aircraft was built in 1940, one of 40 produced by Canadian Vickers. In service with the RCAF, it flew with several squadrons, on anti-submarine patrols, as a training aircraft and carrying passengers. In 1944, it was disposed of. It was flown by the civilian airline Canadian Pacific Airlines until 1947, then by Queen Charlotte Airlines, who replaced its original engines with American Wright R-1820 Cyclone engines. Queen Charlotte Airlines flew the aircraft on passenger flights until 1952, flying from Vancouver along the Pacific coast of British Columbia. It flew with several other private owners until it was damaged by a ship in 1966. In 1970, it was bought by the RAF Museum and transported to the UK. Parts of a second Stranraer, 915/CF-BYJ, are owned by the Shearwater Aviation Museum, Halifax, Canada. This aircraft also operated with Queen Charlotte Airlines until it crashed on Christmas Eve 1949 at Belize Inlet, British Columbia. Initial parts of the aircraft were recovered in the 1980s, with additional wreckage transported to the museum in November 2008 for eventual restoration, excluding the forward fuselage and cockpit. As of 2025, the parts remain in storage at the museum awaiting restoration.

== See also ==
- Short Knuckleduster

Related development

- Supermarine Southampton
- Supermarine Scapa

Aircraft of comparable role, configuration, and era

- Saro London

Related lists

- List of aircraft of the Royal Air Force
- List of aircraft of World War II

== Sources ==
- Andrews, C. F.; Morgan, Eric B. (1981). Supermarine Aircraft since 1914. London: Putnam. ISBN 978-03701-0-018-0.
- Bowyer, Michael J.F. (1991). Aircraft for the Few: the RAF's fighters and bombers in 1940. Sparkford, UK: Patrick Stephens Ltd. ISBN 978-1-85260-040-2.
- Kostenuk, S.; Griffin, J. (1977). RCAF Squadron Histories and Aircraft: 1924–1968. Toronto: Samuel Stevens, Hakkert & Company. ISBN 978-0-88866-577-5.
- London, Peter (2003). British Flying Boats. Stroud, UK: Sutton Publishing. ISBN 978-0-7509-2695-9.
- March, Daniel J. (2000). British Warplanes of World War II. Hoo (Rochester), UK: Aerospace Publishing Ltd. ISBN 1-84013-391-0.
- Morgan, Eric (April 2001). "Database: Supermarine Stranraer". Aeroplane. No. 235. Stamford, UK: Key Publishing. pp. 53–65.
- Oliver, David (2003). Wings over Water: a chronicle of the flying boats and amphibians of the twentieth century. London: Quantum. ISBN 978-08628-8-559-5.
- "Operational Requirements" (PDF). Aeromilitaria. No. 4. Air Britain. 1996. pp. 87–106. ISSN 0262-8791.
- Pegram, Ralph (2016). Beyond the Spitfire: The Unseen Designs of R.J. Mitchell. Cheltenham, UK: The History Press. ISBN 978-0-7509-6515-6.
- Petrescu, Relly Victoria; Petrescu, Florian Ion (2013). The Aviation History: New Aircraft I - Color. Norderstedt: GmbH. ISBN 978-38482-6-639-5.
- Pigott, Peter (2003). Taming the Skies: A Celebration of Canadian Flight. Toronto; Oxford: Dundurn. ISBN 978-1-55002-469-2.
- Robertson, Bruce (1967). British Military Aircraft Serials 1912–1966. London: Ian Allan ltd. OCLC 6400372.
- Septer, Dirk (April 2001). "Canada's Stranraers". Aeroplane. No. 235. Stamford, UK: Key Publishing.
- Thetford, Owen (1979). Aircraft of the Royal Air Force since 1918. London: Putnam. ISBN 978-03703-0-186-0.
