= Long Beach (British Columbia) =

Beach in British Columbia

Coordinates: 49°03′00″N 125°43′00″W

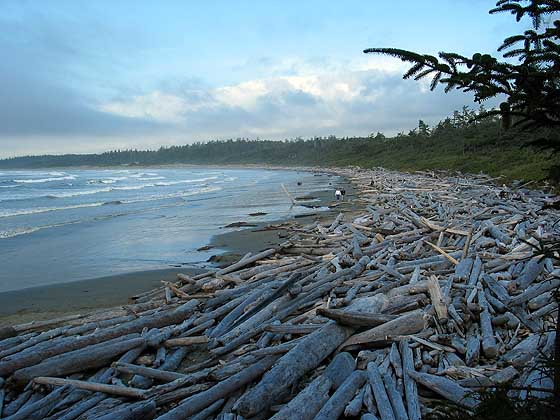
Driftwood logs on Long Beach

Location of Long Beach in British Columbia

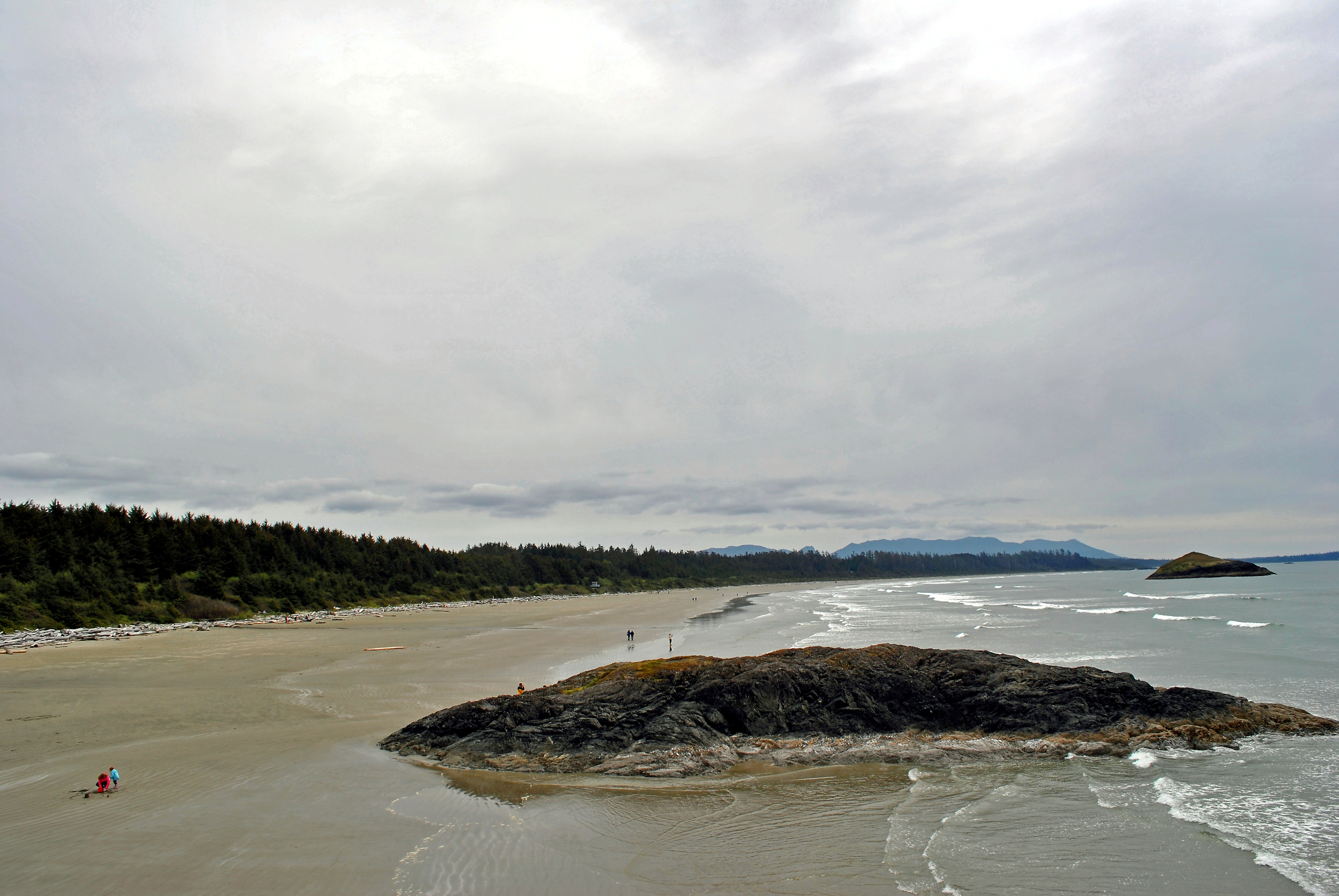
Long Beach, Vancouver Island

Long Beach is the largest and longest beach in the Pacific Rim National Park Reserve on the west coast of Vancouver Island, British Columbia, Canada. It is on Wickaninnish Bay between Tofino (NW) and Ucluelet (SE) and is adjoined by campgrounds and picnic areas. The Tofino–Ucluelet highway parallels the entirety of the beach. The beach's consistent surf, exposed to the open Pacific Ocean, established it as one of the earliest and most popular surfing locations in British Columbia.

Long Beach features rocky 'islands' in the mid-tidal zone of the beach that are accessible only at low tide. When the tide is high, these islands are either surrounded by water or thrashed by ocean swells. In addition, dangerous rip currents exist around the larger islands, and to some extent in the open sea further out. Unsupervised swimming is considered extremely hazardous, and park visitors have been swept from shorebound rocks during storm season. For this reason, beach access is restricted during heavy storm weather. Several posted signs warn about the danger of visiting the beach during high tide, as shorebound logs can be shifted unexpectedly by swells that wash onto the higher reaches of the beach.

== See also ==
- Wickaninnish
