= Hartland Molson =

Canadian politician (1907–2002)

The Honourable Hartland de Montarville Molson OC OBE OQ
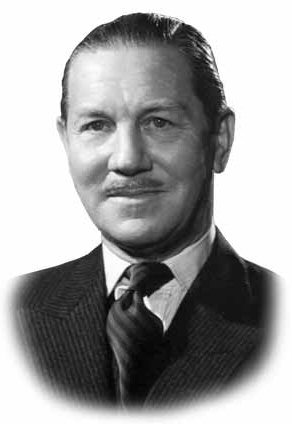

Senator for Alma, Quebec
- In office July 28, 1955 – May 31, 1993
- Appointed by: Louis St. Laurent
- Preceded by: Charles Ballantyne
- Succeeded by: W. David Angus

Personal details
- Born: May 29, 1907 Montreal, Quebec, Canada
- Died: September 28, 2002 (aged 95) Montreal, Quebec, Canada
- Party: Independent
- Relations: Michael Meighen, stepson
- Education: Royal Military College of Canada
- Committees: Chairman, Special Committee on the Rules of the Senate; Chairman, Committee on Standing Rules and Orders
- Civilian awards: Officer of the Order of Canada; Officer of the National Order of Quebec

Military service
- Allegiance: Canada
- Branch/service: Militia (1928–33); Royal Canadian Air Force (1939–45)
- Years of service: 1928–1933; 1939–1945
- Rank: Group Captain
- Unit: 27th Field Battery; No. 115 Squadron RCAF; No. 1 Squadron RCAF; RCAF HQ Ottawa
- Commands: No. 118 Squadron RCAF; No. 126 Squadron RCAF; No. 8 Service Flying Training School RCAF; RCAF Station St-Hubert
- Battles/wars: Second World War: Battle of Britain; Battle of the Atlantic
- Military awards: Officer of the Order of the British Empire

Hartland de Montarville Molson OC OBE OQ (May 29, 1907 – September 28, 2002) was an Anglo-Quebecer statesman, Canadian senator, military aviator, and a member of the Molson family of brewers.

== Education ==
Born in Montreal, Quebec, Canada to a wealthy brewing family (father was Colonel Herbert Molson), Hartland Molson was educated at Selwyn House School in Montreal, Bishop's College School in Lennoxville, Quebec and Charterhouse School in England before attending the Royal Military College of Canada at Kingston, Ontario arriving in 1924, there he played ice hockey for the Kingston Juniors team that made it to 1926 Memorial Cup finals. An all-around athlete, Molson also played first string football, made it to the college's boxing finals twice, and was a member of the track and field team. After graduating in 1928, the bilingual Molson was then sent for training in finance as an employee at a bank in Paris, France. On his return home, he earned his Chartered Accountant designation and in his spare time took flying lessons. In accord with his arrangement with the service following military college, Molson served as a reserve officer in the Militia for five years. He reached the rank of Lieutenant while with the 27th Field Battery between 1928 and 1933.

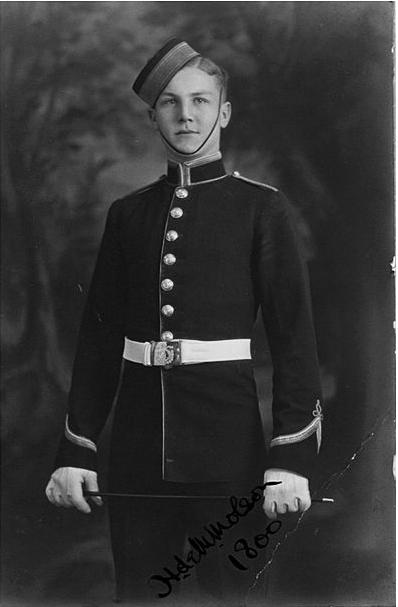
Hartland Molson as an RMC cadet in the mid 1920s

== Family ==
In 1931, he married Helen Hogg but divorced in 1938. They had a daughter, Zoe. She married Henry Nicholas Paul Hardinge, 5th Viscount Hardinge, and moved to live in Jersey.

His second wife, Magdalena Posner, died in 1982. In 1990 Molson married Peggy deLancey Robinson, the widow of former Senator Theodore Meighen. He remained married to Peggy until her death on 18 December 2000. Through his marriage to Peggy, he was also a stepfather to Senator Michael Meighen.

== Wartime military service ==
Molson enlisted in Montreal, Quebec on 21 September 1939 within weeks of the onset of World War II becoming a member of the Royal Canadian Air Force. He earned his wings on 11 April 1940 and was assigned to No. 115 Squadron RCAF in Montreal. He was one of a handful of No. 115 Squadron pilots transferred to No. 1 Squadron RCAF in the spring of 1940 to bolster its numbers in preparation for shipment to the United Kingdom. Arriving in England in June 1940, the squadron underwent rapid training in Royal Air Force (RAF) procedures before being thrown into the desperate battles in the skies over the UK. During the Battle of Britain, he damaged a Do 17 on 26 August, damaged two Messerschmitt Bf 110s on 4 September and claimed a Heinkel He 111 destroyed on 11 September. Molson was shot down during combat with enemy fighters over Canterbury on 5 October, bailed out, wounded, and was admitted to Chartham Hospital. His Hurricane, P3873, crashed at Deering Farm, Smarden. It was his last operational flight. Molson had flown 62 combat missions.

Molson was repatriated to Canada for convalescence. Upon being declared once again fit for flying duties, he was promoted to squadron leader and given command of No. 118 Squadron RCAF flying Grumman Goblins and later Curtiss Kittyhawks at RCAF Dartmouth, Nova Scotia. A command he held from 23 July 1941 to 14 June 1942. When No. 118 Squadron was transferred to the Pacific coast, Molson remained in Dartmouth taking command of 126 Squadron flying Hurricanes. He commanded No. 126 Squadron until 6 September 1942. He took command of No. 8 Service Flying Training School at RCAF Station Moncton in October and oversaw its move to RCAF Station Weyburn Saskatchewan in January 1944. In March 1944 Molson, now a Group Captain, was given command of RCAF Station St-Hubert after a very short stay back in Moncton. On 7 June 1945, Molson was transferred to RCAF Headquarters in Ottawa where he would work at the Directorate of Personnel for the remainder of his time in uniform. He was discharged from the service in September 1945 following the German surrender. For his leadership and wartime service, he was made an Officer of the Order of the British Empire in 1946.

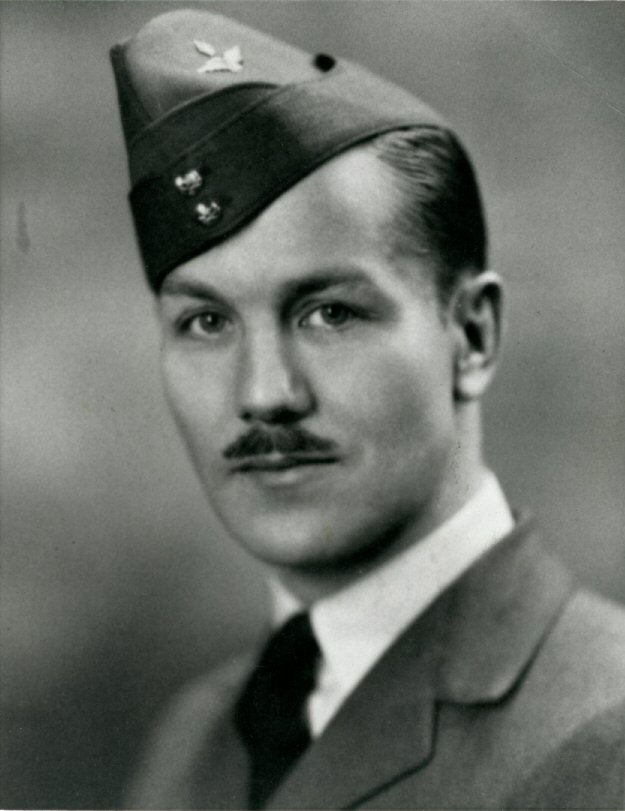
Flying officer Hartland Molson 115 Sqn RCAF, April 1940

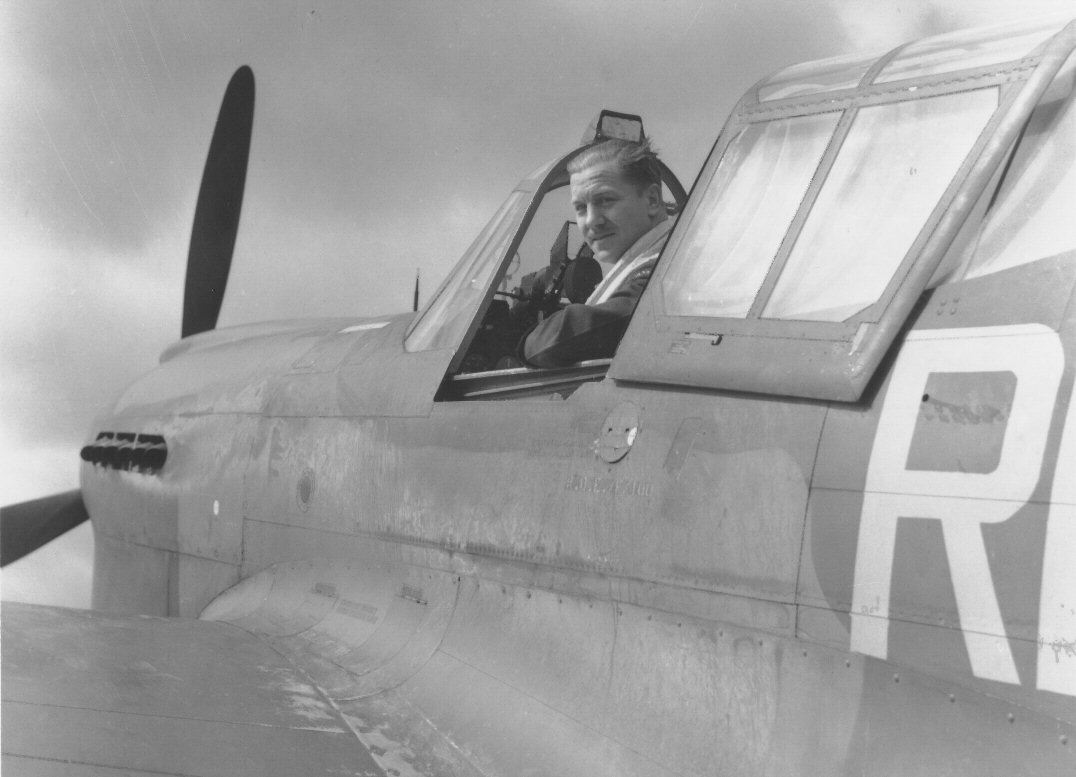
Squadron leader Hartland Molson CO 118 Sqn RCAF in his Kittyhawk fighter at RCAF Dartmouth, Nova Scotia 1942

== Business ==
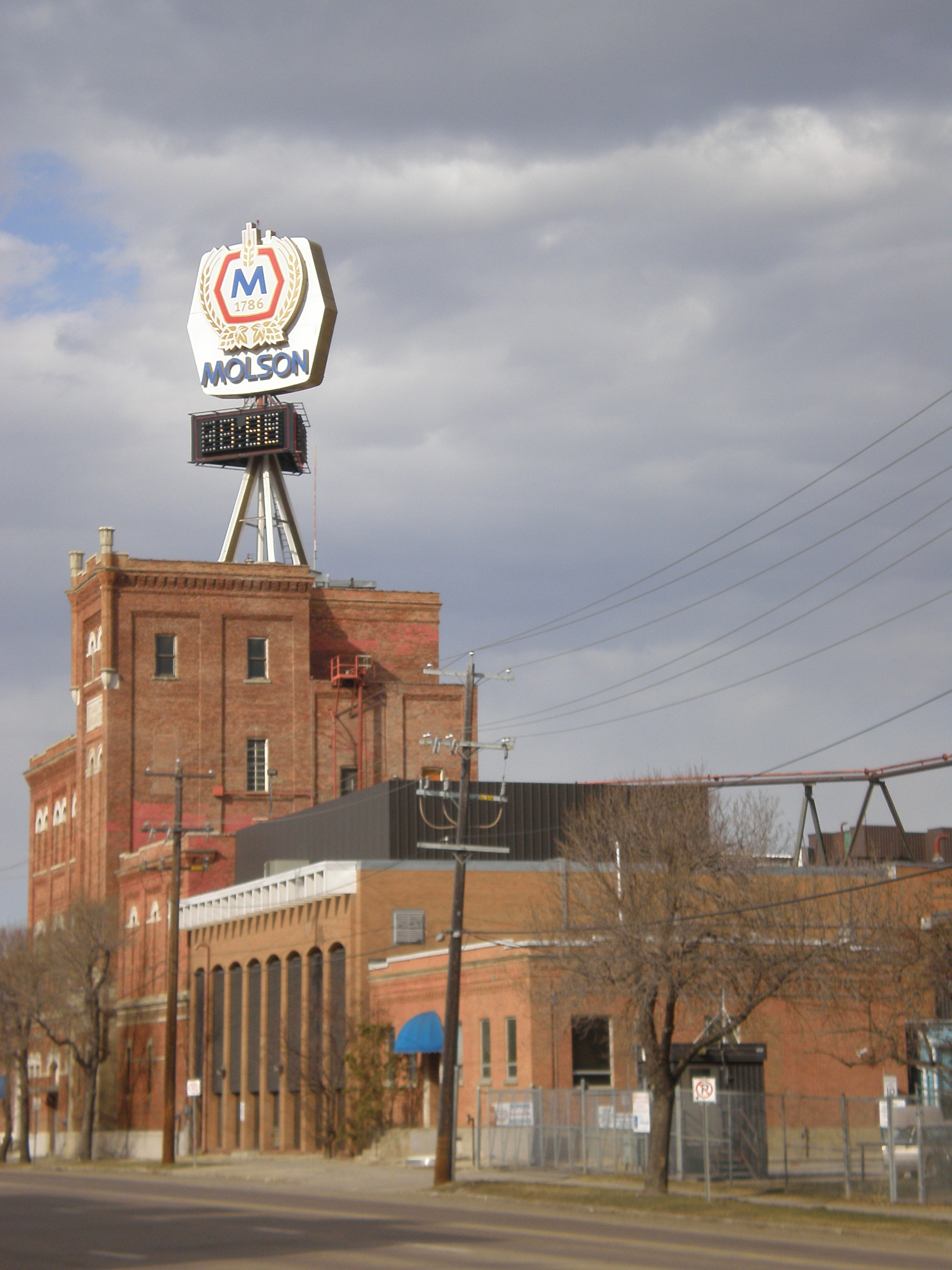
Molson Brewery

At home in Montreal, in 1948 Hartland Molson was named Governor of McGill University, a position he held for the next twenty years. In 1953, he was appointed President of the family's brewing empire, Molson Breweries. He served as president between 1953 and 1966, then Chairman until 1974 and Chairman emeritus until 1983, retiring completely in 1988. During his tenure, the company experienced substantial growth, expanding operations across Canada. Outside of the Molson family businesses, Hartland Molson served on the Board of Directors of a number of major Canadian companies including the Bank of Montreal and Sun Life Assurance.

== Senate ==
In 1955, Prime Minister Louis St. Laurent appointed Molson to the Senate of Canada. Hartland Molson retired from the Senate in 1993 at the age of 86—one of the last Senators to serve past the mandatory retirement age of 75 as he was appointed before the institution of the limit in 1965 and thus exempt. John Michael Macdonald was the last senator to serve past the age of 75 (he died in office in 1997).

== Hockey ==
In 1957, in partnership with his brother Thomas Henry Pentland Molson (1901–1978), Molson purchased the Montreal Canadiens ice hockey team. As a member of the Board of Governors of the National Hockey League, Molson was instrumental in raising the profile of both the league and his brewing company through sponsorship of the Hockey Night in Canada television broadcasts. As head of the Montreal Canadiens team, he helped develop the personnel to end the Detroit Red Wings dominance, building one of the greatest dynasties in all of sport. After winning the 1968 Stanley Cup Hartland retired, and David, Peter, and William Molson took over control of the Canadiens. The team was sold in 1972 to Edward and Peter Bronfman. Senator Hartland Molson's name was engraved on the Stanley Cup 6 times 1958-59-60-65-66-68. In 1973, he was inducted into the builders category of the Hockey Hall of Fame.

== FLQ threat ==
Molson's high-profile image made him a prime target for the Front de libération du Québec (FLQ), a terrorist organization dedicated to Quebec sovereignty. During the 1970 October Crisis, when British diplomat James Cross was kidnapped and Pierre Laporte, the Vice-Premier of Quebec, was kidnapped and murdered, Hartland Molson's name was found on a terrorists' list of future victims.

== Philanthropy ==
Molson was involved with a number of philanthropic causes. He co-initiated the Molson Foundation in 1958, with his brother Thomas Henry Pentland Molson, which has contributed to a broad spectrum of areas, including the arts, sports, infrastructure projects, the Molson nature reserve, and several faculties. Renamed the Molson Family Foundation in 1981, it has dispersed over $120 million in grants. It has also made major gifts to the Montreal Neurological Institute and Montreal General Hospital, the Canadian Paraplegic Association, the Douglas Hospital Corporation, and the Boy Scouts of Canada.

== Awards and recognition ==
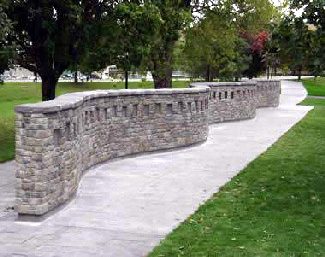
Wall of Honour, Royal Military College of Canada

In 1995, Molson was made an Officer of the Order of Canada and in 2000, the Ordre national du Québec, the highest civilian honor of his country and his native province. Hartland Molson Hall at Bishop's College School is named for him. 438th Tactical Helicopter Squadron in Saint-Hubert named their hangar and a cenotaph after him on August 28, 2009. In 2009, 1800 Honourable Hartland de Montaville Molson, OC, OBE, OQ, DCL, FCA (1907–2002) was added to the wall of honour at the Royal Military College of Canada in Kingston, Ontario.

== Fishing ==
Molson was a well-known salmon fisherman on the Bonaventure River; in Gaspesie.

== Archives ==
The Molson fonds at Library and Archives Canada include a Hartland Molson sub-series.

== See also ==
- List of Bishop's College School alumni
