= No. 9 Service Flying Training School RCAF =

- Country: Canada
- Branch: Royal Canadian Air Force
- Role: Service Flying Training
- Part of: No. 3 Training Command RCAF
- Garrison/HQ: RCAF Station Centralia

No. 9 Service Flying Training School (SFTS), Royal Canadian Air Force, was a flight training school, formed in January 1941, located at RCAF Station Summerside, PEI, and later, RCAF Station Centralia, Ontario. It was part of No. 3 Training Command RCAF, carrying out British Commonwealth Air Training Plan (BCATP) training operations.

Other schools which were the responsibility of No. 3 Training Command included Air Observer (AOS), Bombing and Gunnery (BGS), General Reconnaissance (ocean patrol) (GRS), Naval Aerial Gunnery (NAGS), Air Navigation (ANS) and Operational (OTU) training. On 6 July 1942, the unit was relocated to RCAF Station Centralia in Ontario. There, 9 SFTS continued operations until it was disbanded in June 1945.

Aircraft types flown during its period at these stations included the Avro Anson and North American Harvard, which were standard trainers used for multi-engine and advanced pilot instruction. Relief landing fields supporting Centralia were located at Grand Bend and St. Joseph, Ontario.

== See also ==
- Article XV squadrons
- British Commonwealth Air Training Plan
- RCAF Eastern Air Command
- List of British Commonwealth Air Training Plan facilities in Canada
