= No. 2 Air Navigation School RCAF =

No. 2 Air Navigation School
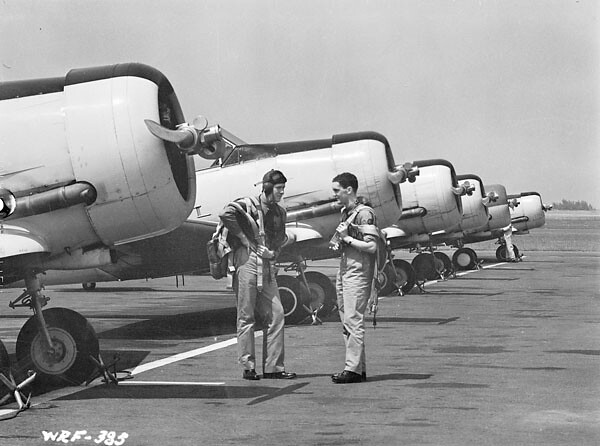
- Active: 1941-1942
- Country: Canada
- Branch: Royal Canadian Air Force
- Role: Air Navigation training
- Part of: RCAF Eastern Air Command; No. 3 Training Command
- Garrison/HQ: RCAF Station Charlottetown

No. 2 Air Navigation School was a navigation training school in No. 3 Training Command RCAF, of the British Commonwealth Air Training Plan("BCATP"), flying Avro Anson's from RCAF Station Pennfield Ridge. It was opened on 21 July 1941 and closed on 30 April 1942. A second school with the same number opened at RCAF Station Charlottetown on 21 February 1944 and closed on 7 July 1945.

RCAF Eastern Air Command was part of the Royal Canadian Air Force's Home War Establishment responsible for air operations on the Atlantic coast of Canada during the Second World War, including BCATP flight schools. Many of its assigned training schools conducted advanced flying courses including Service Flying Training (SFTS), Air Observer (AOS), Bombing and Gunnery (BGS), General Reconnaissance (ocean patrol) (GRS), Naval Aerial Gunnery (NAGS), Air Navigation (ANS) and Operational (OTU) training throughout the war. Together with some advanced aircraft types these units mainly flew older bomber and patrol aircraft that had been removed from active service.

These schools were not part of the Order of Battle of RCAF Eastern Air Command. However, 3 Training Command aircraft were very active over the entire Eastern Command Area of Operations. They made an important contribution to the surveillance of the region as a force multiplier, providing extra eyes and ears. During the emergency known as the Battle of the St. Lawrence, their role was very important and some units undertook combat patrols.

== See also ==
- Article XV squadrons
- British Commonwealth Air Training Plan
- RCAF Eastern Air Command
- List of British Commonwealth Air Training Plan facilities in Canada
