= RCAF Station Pennfield Ridge =

Former military airfield in New Brunswick, Canada

RCAF / RAF Station Pennfield Ridge
- Part of RCAF Eastern Air Command
- Pennfield Parish, near St. George, New Brunswick
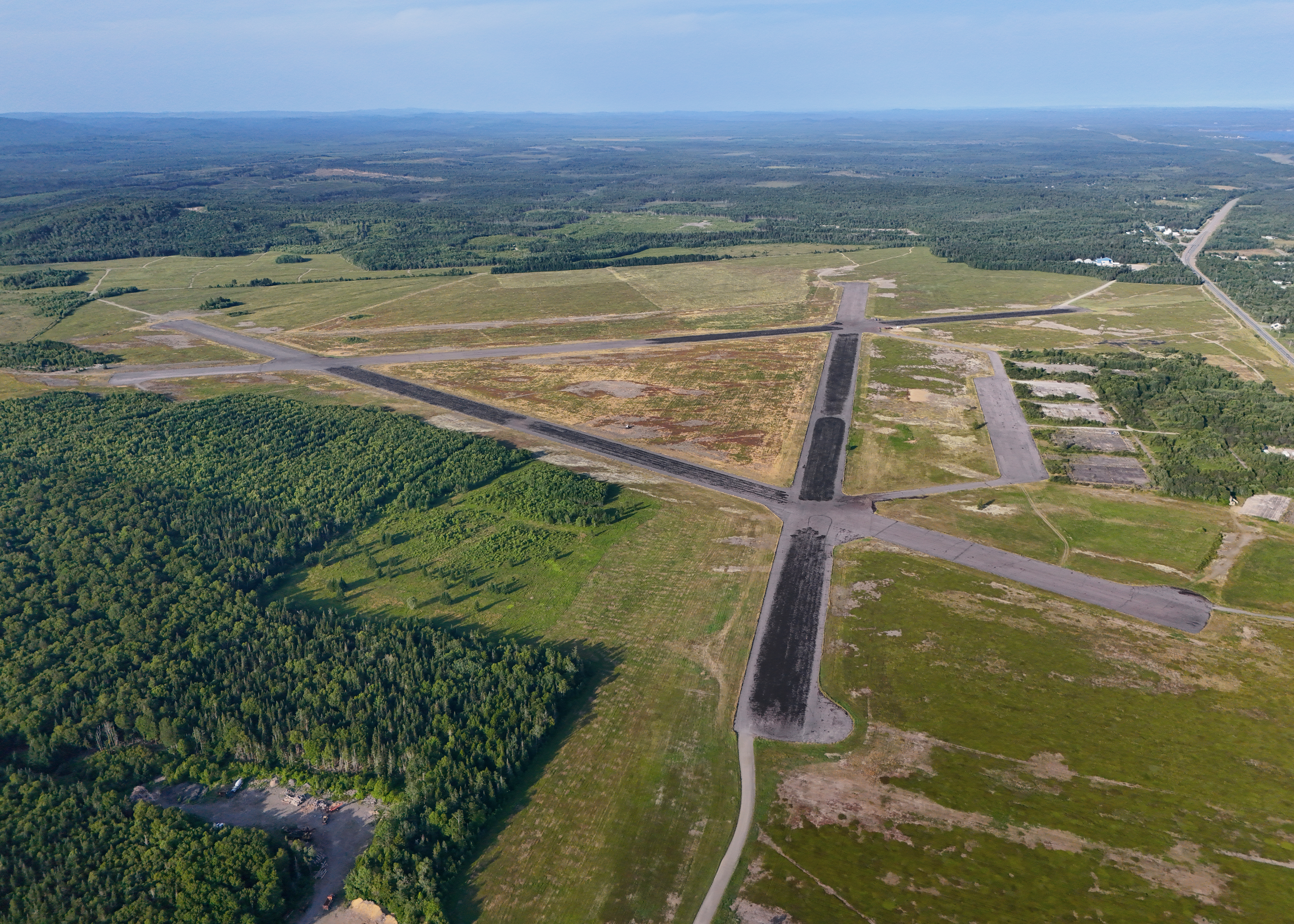
- RCAF / RAF Station Pennfield Ridge in 2025

- Roundel of the Royal Canadian Air Force

Site information
- Type: Royal Canadian Air Force . Royal Air Force training station
- Owner: Department of National Defence (Canada)
- Operator: Royal Canadian Air Force / Royal Air Force
- Controlled by: British Commonwealth Air Training Plan
- Open to the public: No
- Condition: Runways remain, deteriorating

Location
- Location in New Brunswick
- Coordinates: 45°07′38″N 66°41′40″W

Site history
- Built: 1940-1941
- Built by: Royal Canadian Air Force
- In use: 1941–1951
- Materials: Asphalt, concrete
- Fate: Closed; airfield repurposed for civil use
- Events: World War II

Garrison information
- Occupants: RAF Ferry Command, No. 34 Operational Training Unit RAF, No. 2 Air Navigation School RCAF

Airfield information
- Elevation: 240 ft (73 m) AMSL
Runways
| Direction | Length and surface |
|---|---|
| 3/21 | 5,010 ft (1,530 m) Hard surface |
| 15/33 | 4,980 ft (1,520 m) Hard surface |
| 9/27 | 5,085 ft (1,550 m) Hard surface |

RCAF / RAF Station Pennfield Ridge was a Royal Canadian Air Force and Royal Air Force training station located in coastal Charlotte County, New Brunswick in the hamlet of Pennfield Ridge.

== History ==
Construction of the aerodrome began in the summer of 1940 after a suitable site was selected on a ridge high above the surrounding coastal plain of the north shore of the Bay of Fundy, east of the town of St. George. Proximity to a Canadian Pacific Railway line running between St. Stephen and Saint John eased the transport of building materials. General contractor Dexter Construction had 200 workers on the project by August 1940 and the runways were finished by November.

The base was located southwest of the Camp Utopia, an army training facility for southwestern New Brunswick. The rugged, often foggy, coastline of the Bay of Fundy allowed pilots to train in conditions similar to those they would face in Southern England.

The first test flights took place on January 1, 1941 and the base officially opened on July 21 of that year, housing No. 2 Air Navigation School RCAF and later No. 34 Operational Training Unit RAF, under the command of No. 3 Training Command RCAF, which was headquartered in Montreal as part of the British Commonwealth Air Training Plan (BCATP).

By the end of summer 1941, over 40 buildings were constructed on the base, including 4 large hangars, an observation tower, barracks, drill hall, mess halls and classrooms, along with a water supply and internal telephone system. The three runways were lengthened in the fall of 1941 into the classic BCATP triangle arrangement.

The airfield was decommissioned by the RCAF toward the end of World War II, with air force activities in eastern Canada being concentrated at RCAF Station Greenwood, RCAF Station Debert, RCAF Station Summerside and RCAF Station Chatham. The Pennfield Ridge base became the operational location for heavy transport until it was purchased several years later and operated by a commercial airline company as an alternative to the inadequate airport serving Saint John at Millidgeville.

After the new Saint John Airport was opened in the early 1950s, Pennfield Ridge closed as an operational airfield. One of its runways was used as a drag racing track by the New Brunswick Drag Racing Association during the 1950s-1970s.

Today, two of the three runways are used for drying seaweed which is then marketed as a natural plant fertilizer. The remaining runway is still able to handle small aircraft under visual flight rules (VFR) conditions; there is a small fuel reserve tank for the use of J.D. Irving Limited and New Brunswick Department of Natural Resources aircraft.

Less than 2 km (1.2 mi) to the east of the airfield is the location of the Jim Mollison landing in August 1932, in which Mollison completed the first solo east-to-west transatlantic flight. His aircraft was a de Havilland Puss Moth (G-ABXY) dubbed The Heart's Content.

On 24 September 2006, a memorial was erected at a nearby park in Pennfield by the Charlotte County War Memorial Committee (Members: J. David Stuart, Mark Pedersen and Morris Harris) to honour the sixty men who died while on training at Pennfield Ridge. Subsequent research by Pennfield Parish Military Historical Society shows that there were sixty-eight men who died while serving/training at Pennfield Ridge Air Station. There were also six civilian casualties as well.

== Aerodrome information ==
In approximately 1942 the aerodrome was listed as RCAF Aerodrome - Pennfield Ridge, New Brunswick at 45°08′N 66°41′W with a variation of 22 degrees west and elevation of 240 ft (73 m). Three runways were listed as follows:

| Runway name | Length | Width | Surface |
|---|---|---|---|
| 3/21 | 5,010 ft (1,530 m) | 150 ft (46 m) | Hard surfaced |
| 15/33 | 4,980 ft (1,520 m) | 150 ft (46 m) | Hard surfaced |
| 9/27 | 5,085 ft (1,550 m) | 150 ft (46 m) | Hard surfaced |
