= Greater Moncton Roméo LeBlanc International Airport =

International airport serving Moncton, New Brunswick, Canada

Greater Moncton Roméo LeBlanc International Airport Aéroport international Roméo-LeBlanc du Grand Moncton

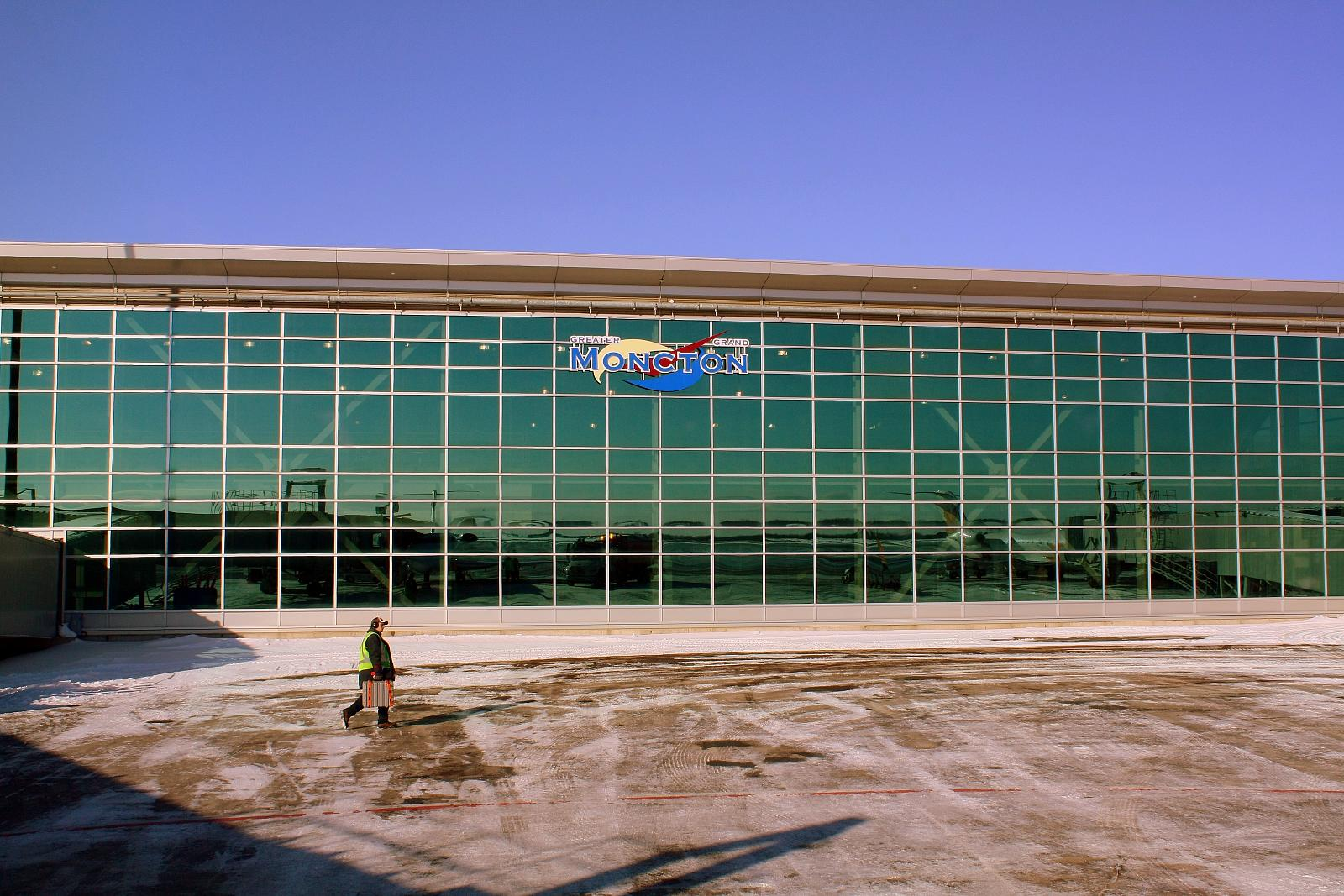
- Terminal building
- IATA: YQM; ICAO: CYQM; WMO: 71705

Summary
- Airport type: Public
- Owner: Transport Canada
- Operator: Greater Moncton International Airport Authority
- Serves: Moncton, New Brunswick
- Location: Dieppe, New Brunswick
- Time zone: AST (UTC−04:00)
  - Summer (DST): ADT (UTC−03:00)
- Elevation AMSL: 232 ft (71 m)
- Coordinates: 46°06′58″N 064°40′43″W
- Website: www.cyqm.ca

Map
- Location within New Brunswick Location within Canada

Runways
Direction	Length		Surface
Direction	ft	m	Surface
06/24	10,001	3,048	Asphalt
11/29	8,000	2,438	Asphalt

Statistics (2025)
- Number of passengers: 656,246
- Sources: Canada Flight Supplement; Environment Canada; Movements from Statistics Canada; Passenger statistics from Greater Moncton International Airport Authority

Greater Moncton Roméo LeBlanc International Airport (GMIA, French: Aéroport international Roméo-LeBlanc du Grand Moncton) or Moncton/Greater Moncton Roméo LeBlanc International Airport (IATA: YQM, ICAO: CYQM) is located in the city of Dieppe 4 nautical miles (7.4 km; 4.6 mi) east northeast of downtown Moncton, New Brunswick, Canada. Originally named Greater Moncton International Airport, the airport was renamed in 2016, in honour of former Governor General Roméo LeBlanc.

The GMIA handled 674,406 passengers and 122,308 aircraft movements in 2019.

GMIA covers a total land area of 760 hectares (1,878 acres) of airport property.

Designated as an international airport by Transport Canada, it is staffed by the Canada Border Services Agency (CBSA). CBSA officers at this airport currently can handle aircraft with up to 300 passengers, although planes as large as the 580 passenger Boeing 747 have been handled.

GMIA is home to the Moncton Flight College, the largest flight college in Canada.

== History ==
On January 11, 1928, the first scheduled air flight out of the Greater Moncton area took place. This flight was carrying mail and passengers to the Magdalen Islands. Two sites were considered for the first air strip. Leger's Corner was chosen however because of more favourable landing conditions. Part of this land was donated by Simon B. LeBlanc of Leger's Corner, a developer, land owner and owner of the LeBlanc general store and post office located on the south corner of the now named streets of Acadie Avenue and Champlain Street.

In 1929, a local private company bought the land at Léger's Corner airstrip and through the years two runways were constructed as well as structures for aircraft maintenance. It was also in 1929 that the Moncton Aero Club was founded, as was the International Airways Flying School. These later became the Moncton Flight College, one of the pre-eminent flight schools in Canada. Also in the same year, the airport expanded its air mail service to include Prince Edward Island and Montreal.

In 1936, Transport Canada and the local government discussed the possibility of the construction of an airport suitable for trans-Canadian routes. The Léger's Corner site was unsuitable for expansion and instead they chose a site in nearby Lakeburn as the new site for the airport. A paved runway and two additional dirt landing strips were constructed.

In March 1940, the Department of National Defence opened a No. 8 Service Flying Training School(SFTF) at the newly developed RCAF Station Moncton under the auspices of the British Commonwealth Air Training Plan. The school trained war pilots for the Commonwealth nations. A new hangar was also constructed at the airport during the war to serve as a repair and maintenance facility.

During the 1940s, civilian air services expanded and became available serving Montreal, Halifax, Charlottetown, Sydney, Saint John, Fredericton and Newfoundland. The hangar of Trans-Canada Air Lines (later Air Canada), became the location for the first air terminal. In 1952, a larger hangar was converted into a modern air terminal but it was very shortly thereafter destroyed by fire. In 1953, a replacement air terminal was constructed.

Further expansion in 1964 brought many changes to the airport including an air traffic control tower and a new operations building. In 1976, the air terminal was again expanded.

Throughout the years, many renovations have been made to the air terminal building, including in 1998–99, an international arrivals area to suit the needs of 1999's eighth Sommet de la Francophonie. A large landing apron was constructed at the same time at the opposite side of the airport in a location which would later become the site of the new international airport terminal. This landing apron would be pressed into service in a dramatic manner on September 11, 2001, when airspace over North America was shut down following the World Trade Center attacks. A dozen flights with over 2,000 passengers were diverted to the Greater Moncton Airport. In May 2001, the new, state-of-the-art international air terminal was completed and officially opened in 2002 by Queen Elizabeth II. The Greater Moncton International Airport is the busiest airport in New Brunswick, serving more than 552,629 passengers per year.

In May 2006, Continental Airlines' subsidiary Continental Express began Moncton's only nonstop service to the United States with once-daily (sometimes twice daily) flights to Newark Liberty International Airport in Newark, New Jersey, near New York City. However, the service between Moncton and Newark was ended on September 19, 2014.

FedEx Express, TC Ventus Freight and Purolator Courier also have large hangars at the airport.

== Airlines and destinations ==
=== Passenger ===
Airlines	Destinations
Air Canada	Toronto–Pearson; Seasonal: Montréal–Trudeau
Air Canada Express	Montréal–Trudeau, Ottawa
Air Canada Rouge	Montréal–Trudeau, Toronto–Pearson
Air Transat	Seasonal: Cancún, Punta Cana
Flair Airlines	Seasonal: Toronto–Pearson
PAL Airlines	Deer Lake, Mont-Joli, St. John's, Wabush
Porter Airlines	Ottawa, Toronto–Billy Bishop; Seasonal: Hamilton (begins May 21, 2027), Montréal–MET, Toronto–Pearson
WestJet	Calgary; Seasonal: Edmonton, Montego Bay, Puerto Plata, Punta Cana

=== Cargo ===
Airlines	Destinations
Cargojet Airways	Halifax, Hamilton (ON), Montreal–Mirabel, St. John's
FedEx Express	Halifax, Montreal–Mirabel

== Statistics ==
=== Annual traffic ===
Annual passenger traffic
Year	Passengers	% change
2010	552,629	Steady
2011	579,329	▲4.8%
2012	615,085	▲6.2%
2013	647,682	▲5.3%
2014	677,159	▲4.6%
2015	644,275	▼ -4.9%
2016	657,272	▲2%
2017	665,630	▲1.3%
2018	681,437	▲2.4%
2019	674,406	▼ -1.0%
2020	173,404	▼ -74.3%
2021	177,040	▲2.1%
2022	468,821	▲164.8%
2023	600,121	▲28.0%
2024	661,629	▲10.2%
2025	656,246	▼ -0.8%

== Accidents and incidents ==
- On February 11, 1963, a Curtiss C-46E Commando operated by Maritime Central Airways was destroyed in a hangar fire at the airport.
- On March 24, 2010, a Boeing 727 operated by Cargojet Airways was damaged after its crew was unable to stop on the available landing distance. The aircraft overran the runway and became stuck in deep mud off the end of the runway. None of the crewmembers onboard were injured and the aircraft received minor damage. Investigators found that the presence of standing water on the runway caused the aircraft to hydroplane, causing a loss of directional control and braking ability, significantly increasing the required stopping distance. The reduction of reverse thrust following touchdown to realign with the runway centreline, in accordance with the manufacturer's recommended practice, increased the aircraft's required stopping distance. The crew's decision to fly the instrument approach by hand instead of monitoring an autopilot-coupled approach likely contributed to the aircraft's higher than required airspeed that was maintained until touchdown. The combination of delayed touchdown, a higher-than-required touchdown speed, and standing water on the runway prevented the aircraft from stopping within the available landing distance.
- On October 14, 2016, a Beechcraft 1900D operated by Exploits Valley Air Services suffered a hard landing following a steep flare. Though the crew did not notice any damage on their postflight walkaround, the operator's maintenance personnel subsequently discovered that the rear tail strakes had suffered damage from a previous landing. An investigation into the incident is ongoing.

== See also ==
- Moncton/McEwen Airport
- Transportation in Greater Moncton
