= CFB St. Hubert =

Former Canadian Forces airbase in Quebec

- Montreal Metropolitan Airport in Canada
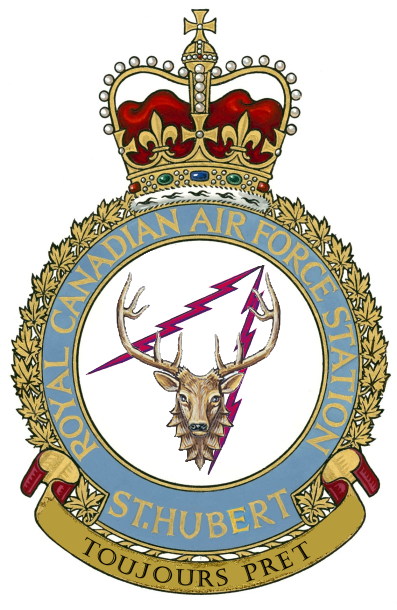
- Badge of RCAF Station St-Hubert (pre-1969)

Site information
- Type: Airbase
- Owner: Department of National Defence
- Operator: Canadian Armed Forces

Location
- Location within Quebec
- Coordinates: 45°30′58.54″N 73°25′14.77″W

Garrison information
- Occupants: Current: 438 Squadron; 34 Service Battalion; 5 Military Police Platoon; Past: 13 SFTS RCAF; 115 Squadron; 118 Squadron; 401 Squadron; 410 Squadron; 416 Squadron; 421 Squadron; 423 Squadron; 425 Squadron; 426 Squadron; 429 Squadron; 444 Squadron; 450 Squadron; EWU RCAF; Air Defence Command HQ; Mobile Command HQ; 712 Communication Squadron

Canadian Forces Base St. Hubert was a Canadian Forces base in the city of Saint-Hubert, Quebec. The base began as a civilian airfield in the 1920s and was later also used by RCAF auxiliary (reserve) squadrons, beginning in the mid-1930s. It became a fully-fledged Royal Canadian Air Force (RCAF) station early in World War II, being extensively used for training as part of the British Commonwealth Air Training Plan. After the war, it grew into one of the most important air bases in Canada, and remained so for decades.

== History ==
=== World War II ===
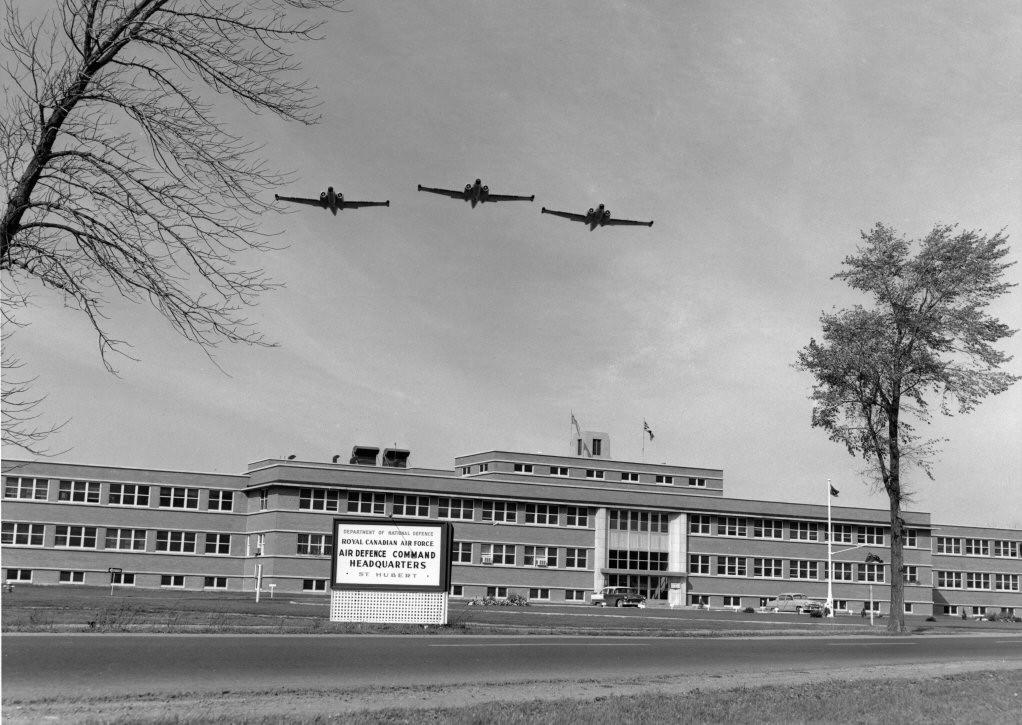
Avro Canada CF-100 Canucks flying over Air Defence Command HQ at RCAF Station St-Hubert in the 1950s. The building later became the Canadian Army HQ until 1997, and after a major overhaul, is now the Longueuil City Hall.

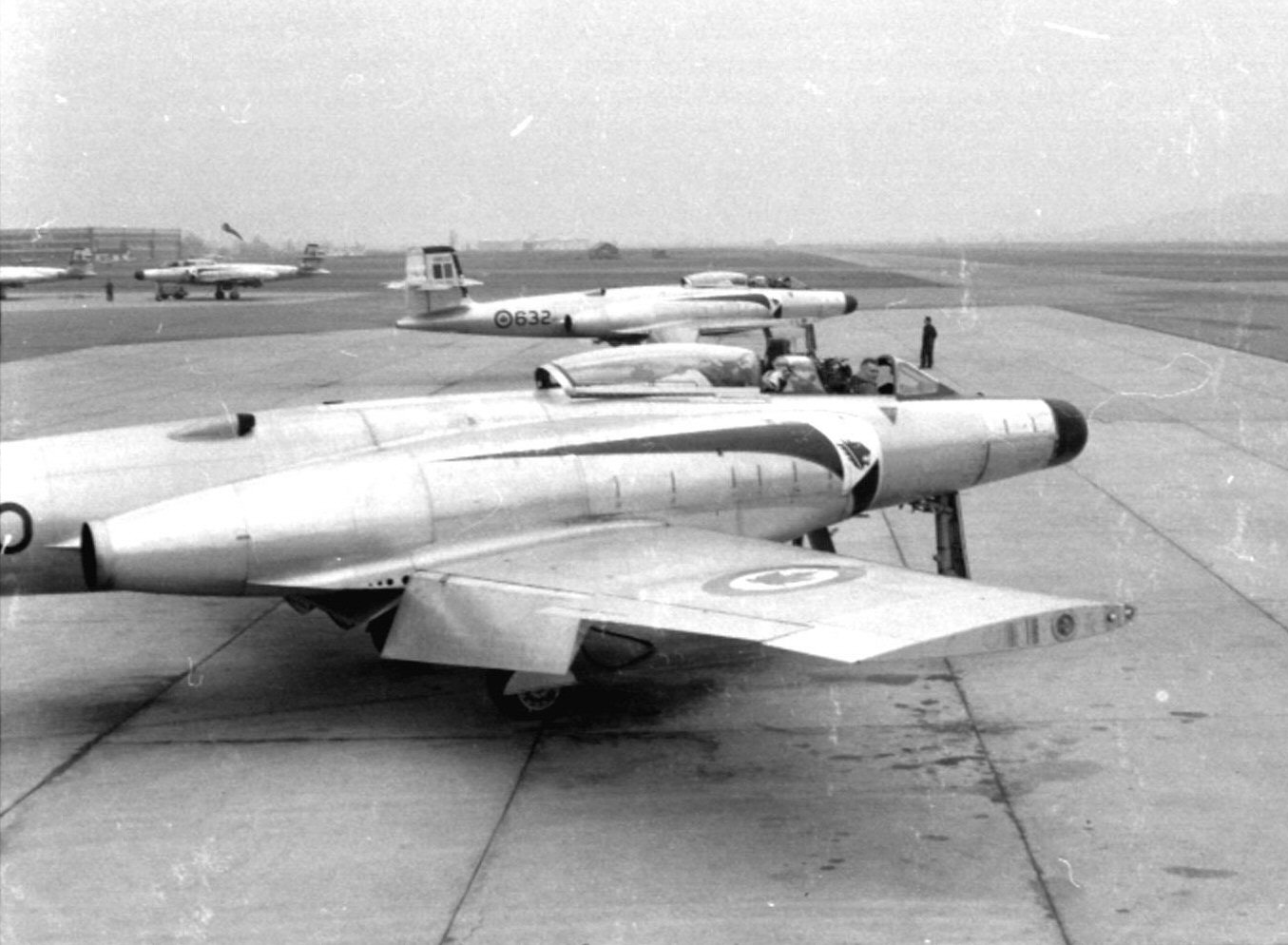
Avro Canada CF-100 Canuck fighters of 416 All Weather Fighter Squadron on the ramp at RCAF Station St-Hubert

RCAF Station St Hubert was a Royal Canadian Air Force (RCAF) airbase established in World War II at the Montréal/Saint-Hubert Airport. As part of the British Commonwealth Air Training Plan the station was home to the No. 13 Service Flying Training School (13 SFTS) from 1 September 1941 to February 1944 when it moved to North Battleford, Saskatchewan. It had a relief field located at Farnham, Quebec. It operated the North American Harvard and the Avro Anson as advanced training aircraft. In 1942 the aerodrome was listed as RCAF Aerodrome - St.Hubert, Province of Quebec at 45°31′N 73°26′W with a variation of 16 degrees west and elevation of 87 ft (27 m). Three runways were listed as follows:

Runway name	Length	Width	Surface
6/24	4,840 ft (1,480 m)	150 ft (46 m)	Hard surfaced
10/28	2,840 ft (870 m)	150 ft (46 m)	Hard surfaced
1/19	3,630 ft (1,110 m)	150 ft (46 m)	Hard surfaced

=== Postwar ===
As early as 1946, RCAF squadrons that had been previously disbanded overseas the year before following the end of hostilities were being reformed in Canada. Both regular and auxiliary units were reactivated in St-Hubert, such as 410 Squadron, a regular RCAF unit flying the new Vampire jet fighter, 401 Squadron, and 438 (Aux) Squadron, which flew Harvard trainers before converting to the Vampire, and later the Canadair CT-133 Silver Star.

In its heyday as an operational air force station, it was host to multiple jet squadrons flying the Avro Canada CF-100 Canuck all-weather interceptor, as well as two Royal Canadian Air Force Reserve Canadair Sabre fighter squadrons and two multi-engine transport squadrons. It was the host station to RCAF Air Defence Command Headquarters. It became part of CFB Montreal upon the unification of the Canadian Armed Forces in 1968, with the headquarters now serving as the Mobile Command Headquarters. The main base was decommissioned by the Canadian Forces in the mid-1990s, being downsized to a garrison under the administrative control of CFB Montreal.

=== Post-decommissioning ===
The airport remains in use as Montreal Metropolitan Airport. The married quarters housing area remains under military control. Several of the buildings were taken over by the city of St-Hubert for their police and civic administration. Some of the hangars have been converted to motion picture sound stages. Barracks blocks and dining facilities have either been demolished or converted to commercial spaces.

== Operations ==
438 Tactical Helicopter Squadron operates from the former base's airfield. No longer using the runways, 438 Squadron has separate helipads located next to a hangar on rue Leckie.

A Canadian Forces garrison remains at the airport. New army recruits in the Primary Reserve often take their Basic Military Qualification course under the supervision of 34 Service Battalion, a unit of 34 Canadian Brigade Group, at this location.
