= Air Defence Command (Canada) =

1951–1975 Royal Canadian Air Force unit

Air Defence Command was a command of the Royal Canadian Air Force and later the Canadian Armed Forces, active from 1951 to 1975.

Originally, post-war plans called for air defence to be the responsibility of reserve, auxiliary squadrons only. Vampire jet fighters and older P-51 Mustangs were earmarked for these squadrons. With the rise of the "Iron Curtain" and the increasing tension in Europe, a change was seen as necessary and regular, full-time squadrons became the force's frontline.

In December 1948, No. 1 Air Defence Group was created in Ottawa, Ontario. In November 1949 Group Headquarters moved to RCAF Station St. Hubert, Quebec. No. 1 Air Defence Group became Air Defence Command in June 1951. The command reached its highest strength in 1955, by which time nine Regular Force squadrons (flying Avro Canada CF-100 Canucks) and ten Auxiliary squadrons (flying Vampires and Mustangs) fell under its control. Among the reserve/Auxiliary squadrons was No. 401 Squadron RCAF, flying from St. Hubert and Montreal. De Havilland Vampires served in both operational and air reserve units (Nos 400, 401, 402, 411, 438 and 442 Squadrons RCAF) until retirement in the late 1950s when they were replaced by the Canadair Sabre.

Among the CF-100 units were:

- No. 428 Squadron RCAF, the first CF-100 All-Weather Fighter Squadron, 1954 - 1961.
- No. 410 Squadron RCAF, flying CF-100s from RCAF Station Uplands, Ontario (1956-)
- No. 414 Squadron RCAF, flying CF-100s and later CF-101 Voodoos from RCAF Station North Bay, 1957–64
- No. 433 Squadron RCAF, flying CF-100s, 1955-1961
- No. 445 Squadron RCAF, flying CF-100s from North Bay, 1 April to 31 August 1953.

As equipment capability increased, and the perceived Soviet bomber threat diminished, the requirement for numbers decreased, and the nine CF-100 squadrons were replaced by five CF-101 squadrons, which later fell to three. The auxiliary squadrons also lost their air defence role. At the same time, the Pinetree Line, the Mid-Canada Line and the DEW Line radar stations, largely operated by the RCAF, were built across Canada because of the growing Soviet nuclear threat.

On January 1, 1957, the Commander-in-Chief of the U.S. joint-service Continental Air Defense Command placed the US defenses in a geometric "Canadian Northeast Area" under the operational control of the Canadian Air Defence Command. Installations affected appear to have included the Hall Beach DEW Line station constructed 1955–1957 and the Hopedale stations set up as part of the 1954 Pinetree Line and 1957 Mid-Canada Line.

In September 1957, the Command became part of the new North American Air Defense Command (NORAD).

Air Defence Command headquarters moved to CFB North Bay, Ontario, in August 1966.

In 1968 the units of the command were listed as:

- No. 409 AW (F) Squadron CFB Comox, British Columbia. Flew the CF-101B aircraft.
- No. 414 (EWOT) Squadron CFB St. Hubert, Quebec. Flew the CF-100 5 aircraft.
- No. 416 AW (F) Squadron CFB Chatham, New Brunswick. Flew the CF-101B aircraft.
- No. 417 (ST/R) Squadron CFB Cold Lake, Alberta. Flew the CF-104D aircraft.
- No. 425 AW (F) Squadron CFB Bagotville, Quebec. Flew the CF-101B aircraft.
- No. 445 (SAM) Squadron CFB North Bay, Ontario. Equipped with the Bomarc missile.
- No. 447 (SAM) Squadron La Macaza, Quebec. Equipped with the CIM-10 Bomarc missile.

In 1974 CFB Chatham, St. Margarets Detachment became the site for a Satellite Tracking Unit (SITU). In September 1975 the Command was reduced to Air Defence Group and came under command of Air Command. In 1984 Air Defence Group was renamed as Fighter Group. In 1987 Fighter Group was merged with Canadian NORAD Region to create a unified air defence command for Canada.

Fighter Group/Canadian NORAD Region was amalgamated into 1 Canadian Air Division on its formation in 1997.

== References and further reading ==
- A History of the Air Defence of Canada, 1948-1997. Commander Fighter Group. 1997. ISBN 978-0-9681973-0-1.
- Milberry, Lawrence "Larry" (1984). Sixty Years: The RCAF and Air Command 1924–1984. Toronto: Canav Books. ISBN 0-07-549484-1.
- Don Nicks, A History of the Air Services in Canada, CanMilAir.com
