= Herbert Molson =

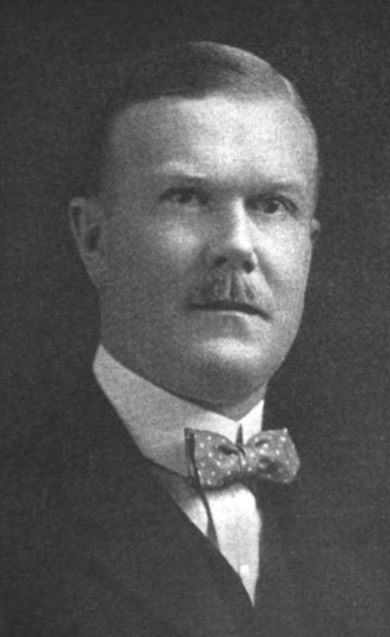
- Born: May 29, 1875; Montreal, Quebec
- Died: March 21, 1938 (aged 62); Montreal, Quebec
- Resting place: Mount Royal Cemetery
- Education: McGill University
- Occupation: Entrepreneur
- Spouse: Elizabeth Zoe Pentland (m. 1899)
- Children: 4
- Awards: Order of St. Michael and St. George

Colonel Herbert Molson CMG MC (May 29, 1875 – March 21, 1938) was a Canadian entrepreneur and philanthropist. He was a former owner of Molson Brewery and a member of the Molson family.

== Life and career ==
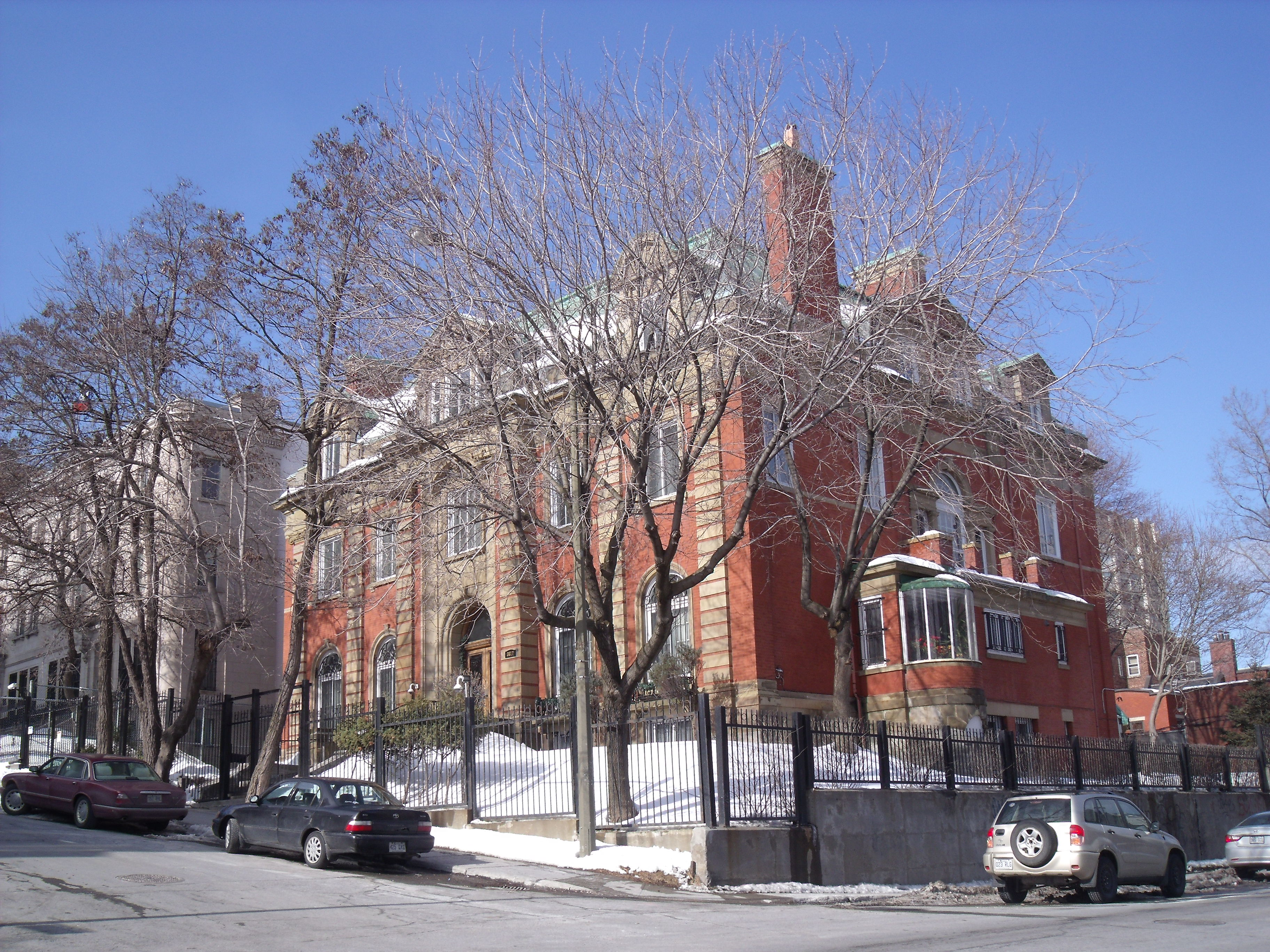
Herbert Molson House, Montreal

He was born on May 29, 1875, the son of John Thomas Molson (1837-1910) and Jane Baker Butler (1850-1926), at Montreal, Quebec, Canada. He was educated at McGill University (B.A.Sc., 1894), and Herbert also attended the United States Brewing Academy in New York.

He entered the family business in 1897 and in 1910 became owner of Molson Brewery. In partnership with Frederick William Molson, he formed Molson's Brewery Ltd. in 1911 and began mechanizing and modernizing the existing plant.

His work was interrupted by the First World War: Herbert went overseas as a Captain and rose to the rank of Colonel. He was wounded in 1916 and awarded the Military Cross (MC), and in 1919, the Most Distinguished Order of St. Michael and St. George (CMG) for his services with the headquarters staff. He was a director of many important Canadian corporations and a generous benefactor of McGill University and the Montreal General Hospital.

In 1899, Herbert was married to Elizabeth "Bessie" Zoe Pentland, daughter of Charles Pentland. Herbert and Bessie had four children: Thomas Henry Pentland Molson (1901-1978); Mary Dorothy Molson MacDougall (1904-1992); Naomi Elizabeth Molson Mather (1906-1992); and Hartland de Montarville Molson (1907-2002).

Molson died on March 21, 1938, in Montreal. His home in the Golden Square Mile is today the Russian Consulate.
