= No. 13 Service Flying Training School RCAF =

- Branch: Royal Canadian Air Force
- Role: Service Flying Training
- Part of: No. 3 Training Command RCAF
- Garrison/HQ: RCAF Station St Hubert

No. 13 Service Flying Training School RCAF was an RAF flight training unit flying Avro Ansons from RCAF Station St Hubert, Quebec and later from RCAF Station North Battleford, Saskatchewan. It was part of No. 3 Training Command RCAF carrying out British Commonwealth Air Training Plan ("BCATP") operations.

== History ==
The school was opened at St Hubert on 1 September 1941, moved to North Battleford on 25 February 1944, and was closed on 30 March 1945. It operated the North American Harvard and the Avro Anson as advanced training aircraft and while at St Hubert fell under No. 3 Training Command.

RCAF Eastern Air Command was the military formation of the Royal Canadian Air Force responsible for air operations on the Atlantic coast of Canada during the Second World War, including BCATP flight schools. Many of its assigned training schools conducted advanced flying courses including flying training, Air Observer, Bombing and Gunnery, General Reconnaissance (ocean patrol), Naval Aerial Gunnery, Air Navigation and Operational training throughout the war. Together with some advanced aircraft types these units mainly flew older bomber and patrol aircraft that had been removed from active service.

These schools were not part of the Order of Battle of RCAF Eastern Air Command. However, three training command aircraft were very active over the entire eastern command area of operations. They made an important contribution to the surveillance of the region as a force multiplier, providing extra eyes and ears. During the emergency known as the Battle of the St. Lawrence their role was very important and some units undertook combat patrols.

== See also ==
- List of Royal Air Force schools
- British Commonwealth Air Training Plan
- List of British Commonwealth Air Training Plan facilities in Canada
