= Moncton Flight College =

Pilot training school in Dieppe, New Brunswick, Canada

Coordinates: 46°06′14″N 64°40′25″W

MFC Training
- Motto: Where dreams take flight
- Type: Private
- Established: 1929
- Location: Dieppe, New Brunswick; Lincoln, New Brunswick
- Campus: Urban
- Website: mfctraining.com

The Moncton Flight College (MFC) is a pilot training school based at the Greater Moncton International Airport (CYQM) in Dieppe, New Brunswick, Canada. They have a second location at the Fredericton International Airport (YFC) in Lincoln, NB. In a year, MFC has the capacity to train 450 students between the Moncton and Fredericton Campus. Currently the Moncton Campus offers domestic and international programs with a 260-student capacity and a staff of 55. The Fredericton campus is primarily for Chinese student training with some modular based flight training and has a capacity of 190 students and employs 75 people. Both of the campuses have on-site kitchens and residences. MFC is the largest private flight school in Canada. It is also one of six, out of 150 schools in Canada, to be given integrated status. The college has trained over 20,000 pilots from approximately 70 countries since 1929. MFC has an approved FTU, ATO and AMO from Transport Canada and also has CAAC (China) approval.

== History ==
The official organizational date of the Moncton Flying Club coincides with the date of the first Air Pageant, held July 1, 1929, to raise money for the airport. A group of citizens had decided that Moncton should be an air center of the Maritimes. The site for the first airport in Moncton was chosen, and work was started in April 1929. However, hard times followed shortly after the airport was complete with the onset of the Great Depression, and all flight activity virtually ceased. It was not until the late 1930s that flight training began again at the Moncton Flying Club. By the end of 1939, the Flying Club was officially incorporated and had a fleet of two privately owned planes.

Canada declared war on Germany on September 10, 1939 and the Moncton Flying Club was given the opportunity to run the "Elementary Flying Training School, Royal Canadian Air Force," (#21 E.F.T.S., R.C.A.F.) newly opened in Chatham, New Brunswick. Training got started at the school in early July 1941, immediately after the first intake of airmen. The Fleet Finch biplane used by the school was a hardy machine with a five-cylinder engine and fabric-covered wings and fuselage. By 1945, Moncton Flying Club was operating three Elementary Flying Training Schools across Canada.

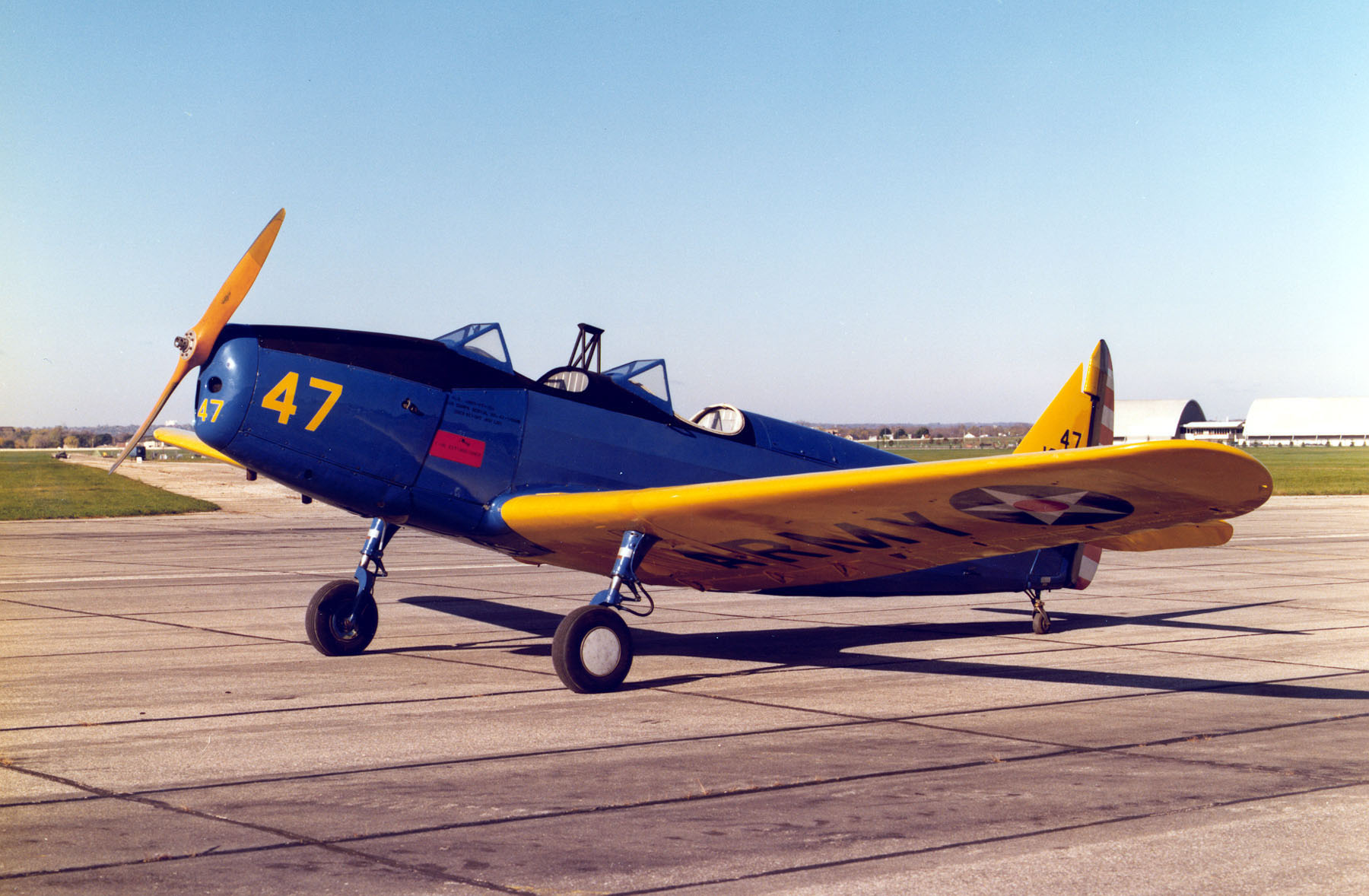
A Fairchild Cornell, one of MFC's main training aircraft during the 1950s

By the 1950s, the Moncton Flying Club had acquired a considerable fleet of aircraft, including four or five Tiger Moths, two Fairchild Cornells, three Aeroncas, and a Cessna T50. Despite tough economic times, membership numbers increased and the Club's notoriety grew. When an allocation of Air Cadets arrived for training, a dormitory and canteen were set up on the premises. In 1949, night flying was added to the curriculum, despite the lack of radar equipment. The Club even put together an air show, the first of many to come, with Harvards and Sea Furies competing and a stunt pilot from Quebec City participating.

The school grew quickly in the late 1950s and early 1960s, and in 1961 the Flying Club was awarded its first Yorath Trophy, symbolic of Canada's top Flying Club. In 1962 the Club took over operation of Atlantic Central Airlines, which consisted of a twin Apache and amphibious Cessna 180. These additions complimented the Club's single engine charter service and enabled it to conduct twin engine training.

June 12, 1965 marked a black day in the club's history, the historic hangar was destroyed in a devastating fire. However, those involved with the Club were determined to rebuild the premises, and on October 8, 1966 the new hangar and dormitory was officially opened.

By the mid-1970s, students were joining from almost every country in Europe and Asia. An eight bay "T" hangar was built during 1974–75, and were used by private owners and the club's aircraft.

In the 1980s, MFC changed its marketing name to "Moncton Flight Centre". For a time a fleet of Piper Navajo aircraft were operated for charters and light parcel express, initially under the name "Hummingbirds" and eventually "Eastwind Flights". In the fall of 1989, the Board of Directors chose to focus on flight training and the assets of Eastwind were sold.

In more recent times the college had been growing quicker than ever, becoming the largest in Canada. In 2006 the school was awarded the largest pilot training contract ever in Canada, to train 800 Chinese pilots. The college announced in 2007 it would soon open a new campus in Fredericton to handle the quickly increasing student population.

Partnering with Mount Allison University, in nearby Sackville, MFC offers an interdisciplinary degree programs combining professional flight training with studies in subjects relevant to the field of aviation in either science or business. The Aviation program at Mount Allison is one of only a few in Canada that allows you to earn an undergraduate degree that incorporates flight and ground school training.

In 1997, under the direction of Brad Mundle, a two-year Diploma in Aviation Technology was created and the organization changed its name to the Moncton Flight College. In the spring of 1998, Mike Doiron resigned from Transport Canada and arrived at MFC to become the new CEO and Principal.

Mr. Doiron developed various programs for target markets such as China and Europe. He also focused considerable attention to improving MFC's curriculum and safety standards. In 2006, MFC received approval from the Civil Aviation Authority of China to train Airline cadets. The College then signed then the largest commercial training contract in Canadian history with the Beijing University of Aeronautics and Astronautics which lead to rapid growth. In 2007, as the Moncton campus reached its capacity, a second campus opened in Fredericton in partnership with CANLink Aviation (CLA). MFC was eventually acquired by CLA in April, 2011.

In December 2011, the Fredericton Campus (CYFC) began operating at full capacity to offer services to the incoming Chinese students as demand for flight training grew. As of May 2014, a portion of the new Chinese classes have been operating out of the Moncton Campus, which made both campuses operate at full capacity.

In 2025, MFC Training announced a partnership with Western University and London International Airport to expand aviation education in Ontario. As part of the agreement, MFC established its first Ontario-based training operation at London International Airport, providing pilot training for students enrolled in Western University’s Commercial Aviation Management program who select the flight training stream. The partnership integrates Western’s academic aviation curriculum with MFC’s Transport Canada–approved Integrated Airline Transport Pilot Licence (iATPL) program, creating a structured pathway from university studies to professional pilot certification. The expansion included the development of training facilities, aircraft, and simulator resources at the London airport and marked a significant geographic expansion of MFC Training’s national operations.

== Location ==
MFC is located in New Brunswick, Canada. With one campus in Moncton and another in Fredericton, both campuses benefit from efficient airport infrastructure and low commercial flight activity. There are 21 combined training areas in Moncton for local training: all within five minutes flying time from the airport. Because of its location, pilots allegedly benefit from four-season training, and are better equipped to safely manage different weather conditions. There is a wide geographical variety including coastal, flat and mountainous.

== Programs and courses ==
- Bachelor of Science, Aviation Major (BSc) - in conjunction with Mount Allison University
- Bachelor of Commerce, Aviation major (BComm) - in conjunction with Mount Allison University
- Bachelor of Arts, Aviation major (BA) - in conjunction with Mount Allison University
- Bachelor of Arts, Aviation major (BA) - in conjunction with St. Thomas University (Canada)
- Bachelor of Management and Organizational Studies (BMOS), iATPL program - in conjunction with Western University (Canada)
- Diploma in Aviation Technology (PILOT)
- Integrated Commercial Pilot Course (ICPC)
- Royal Canadian Air Cadet flying training for the Air Cadet League of Canada and DND
- Traditional Pilot Training Program
  - Recreational Pilot Permit
  - Private Pilot License (PPL)
  - Commercial Pilot License (CPL)
  - Instrument Ratings
  - Multi-Engine Rating
  - Class 4 Instructor Rating
  - Advanced Education
  - Safety Management Systems (SMS)
  - Crew Resource Management (CRM)
  - Airside Vehicle Operator Permit (AVOP)

== Fleet ==
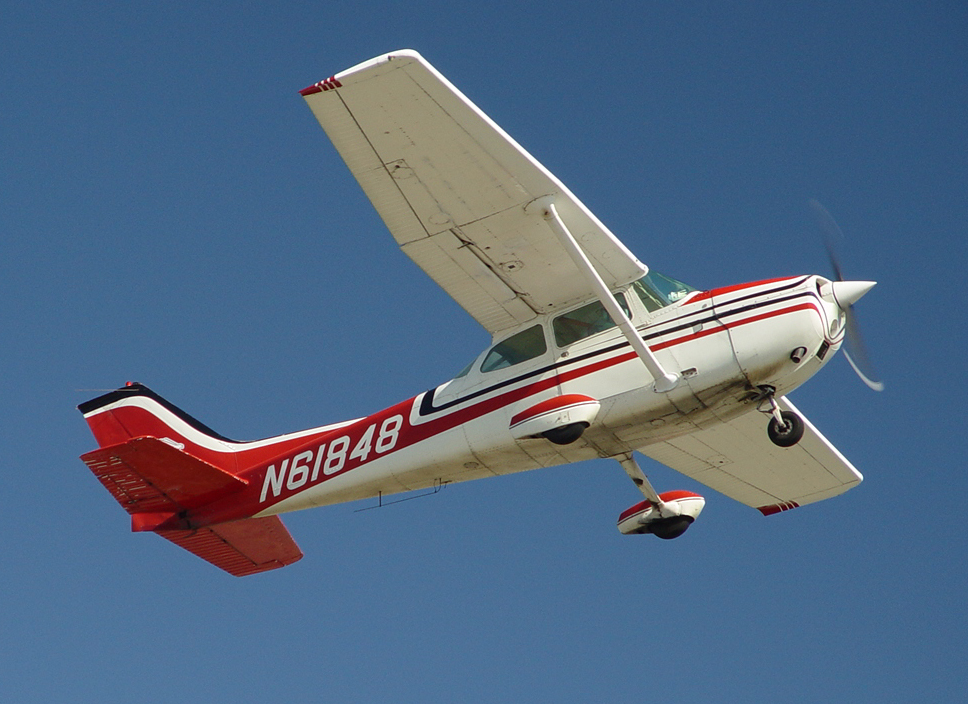
A Cessna 172

Diamond DA20-C1 Eclipse
The Diamond Eclipse had become the college's primary trainer as of September 2003. The college owns and operates 45 Eclipses.

Cessna 172

The college owns and operates 2 Cessna 172S aircraft.

Piper Seminole
The college owns and operates 5 Seminoles, which are used for multi-engine and multi-IFR training.

King Air C90B
The College owns and operates 3 King Air C90B aircraft.

King Air 200 Flight Training Device (FTD) / Simulator
The King Air 200 FTD is a Transport Canada certified level V device. Although not a full motion sim, has a 200 degree view from the flight deck, and is used to simulate various mechanical and weather situations, particularly in training of crew resource management (CRM). This is the first one of its type bought in Canada.

ATC 810 Simulator
The ATC 810 Simulator is used to introduce the student to the first stages of instrument flying by concentrating on procedures and IFR navigation. The Moncton Flight College owns and operates 3 ATC 810's which simulate the Piper Navajo. Both are fitted with HSI's, DME's VOR's, ADF's and dual radios. Each simulator also has a plotter to allow the student to see exactly what they have done during their session.

== See also ==
- Higher education in New Brunswick
- List of universities and colleges in New Brunswick
