= North Battleford Airport =

Airport in Saskatchewan, Canada

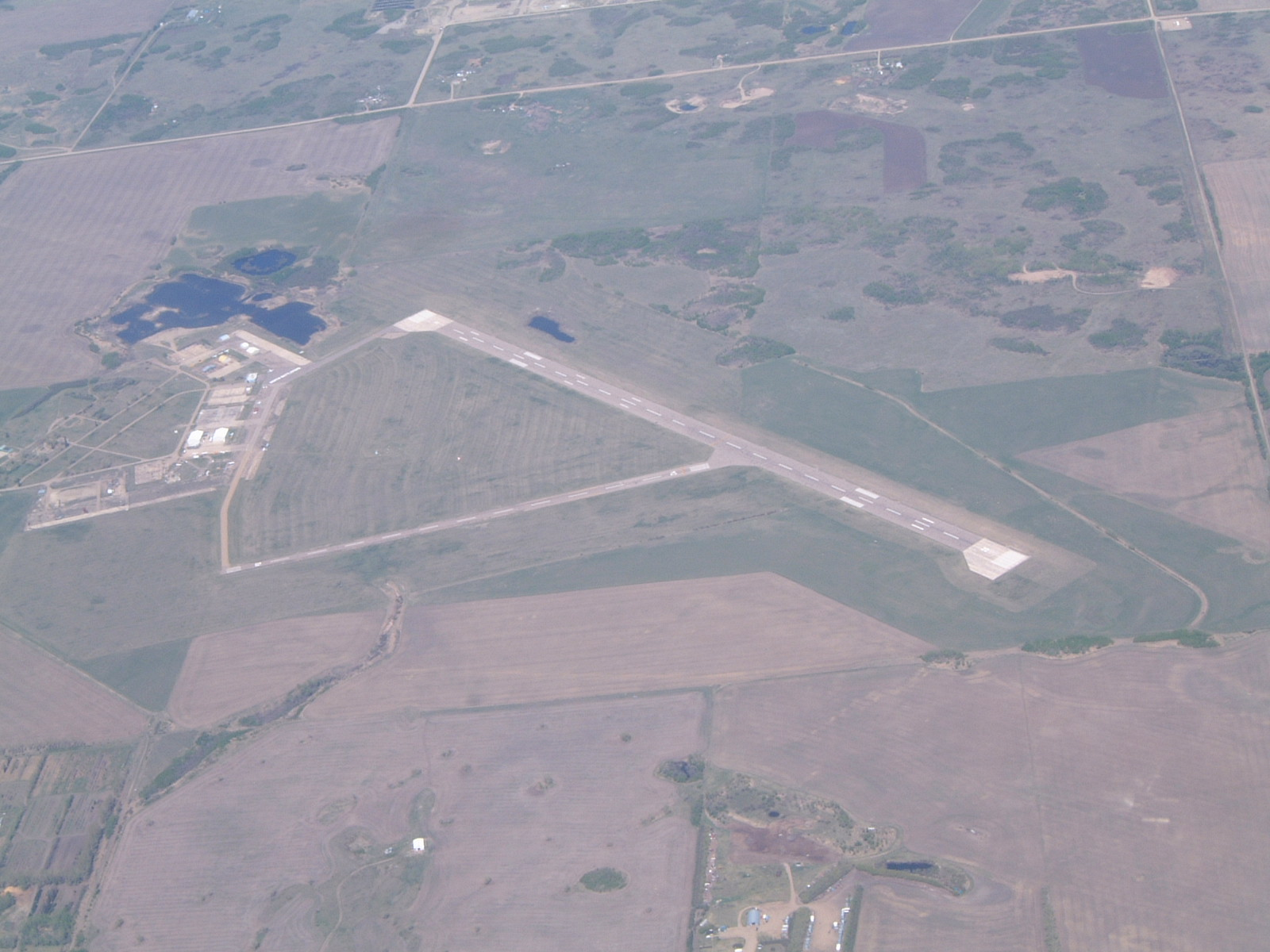
- North Battleford Airport
- IATA: YQW; ICAO: CYQW; WMO: 71876

Summary
- Airport type: Public
- Operator: City of North Battleford
- Location: North Battleford, Saskatchewan
- Time zone: CST (UTC−06:00)
- Elevation AMSL: 1,799 ft / 548 m
- Coordinates: 52°46′09″N 108°14′40″W

Map
- Location in Saskatchewan CYQW (Canada)

Runways
Direction	Length		Surface
Direction	ft	m	Surface
12/30	5,000	1,524	Asphalt

Statistics (2006)
- Aircraft movements: 9
- Source: Canada Flight Supplement; Environment Canada; Movements from Statistics Canada

North Battleford Airport (IATA: YQW, ICAO: CYQW) is located 1.5 nautical miles (2.8 km; 1.7 mi) east of North Battleford, Saskatchewan, Canada.

== History ==
=== World War II ===
The airport was built during World War II as part of the British Commonwealth Air Training Plan and was known as RCAF Station North Battleford. The station hosted the Royal Air Force's No. 35 Service Flying Training School RAF from September 4, 1941 to February 25, 1944, and then No. 13 Service Flying Training School RCAF until March 30, 1945. Relief airfields were located at Brada and Hamlin.

==== Aerodrome information ====
In approximately 1942 the aerodrome was listed as RCAF & D of T Aerodrome - North Battleford at 52°46′N 108°16′W with a variation of 22 degrees east and elevation of 1,787 ft (545 m). Six runways were listed as follows:

Runway name	Length	Width	Surface
16/34	2,700 ft (820 m)	100 ft (30 m)	Hard surfaced
16/34	2,700 ft (820 m)	100 ft (30 m)	Hard surfaced
12/30	2,700 ft (820 m)	100 ft (30 m)	Hard surfaced
12/30	3,000 ft (910 m)	100 ft (30 m)	Hard surfaced
6/24	2,900 ft (880 m)	100 ft (30 m)	Hard surfaced
6/24	2,700 ft (820 m)	100 ft (30 m)	Hard surfaced

==== Relief landing field – Brada ====
A relief landing field for RCAF Station North Battleford was located approximately 7 mi (11 km) south-east. The site was located east of the community of Brada, Saskatchewan. The relief field was constructed in the typical triangular pattern.

In approximately 1942 the aerodrome was listed as RCAF Aerodrome - Brada, Saskatchewan at 52°43′N 108°07′W with a variation of 21 degrees 30' east and elevation of 1,830 ft (560 m). Though listed as a turf all way field, three runways were listed as follows:

Runway name	Length	Width	Surface
16/34	3,300 ft (1,000 m)	---'	Turf
10/28	3,300 ft (1,000 m)	---'	Turf
4/22	3,300 ft (1,000 m)	---'	Turf

A review of Google Maps on June 7, 2018 shows no visibility of the airfield at the listed coordinates.

=== Postwar (1945-2010) ===
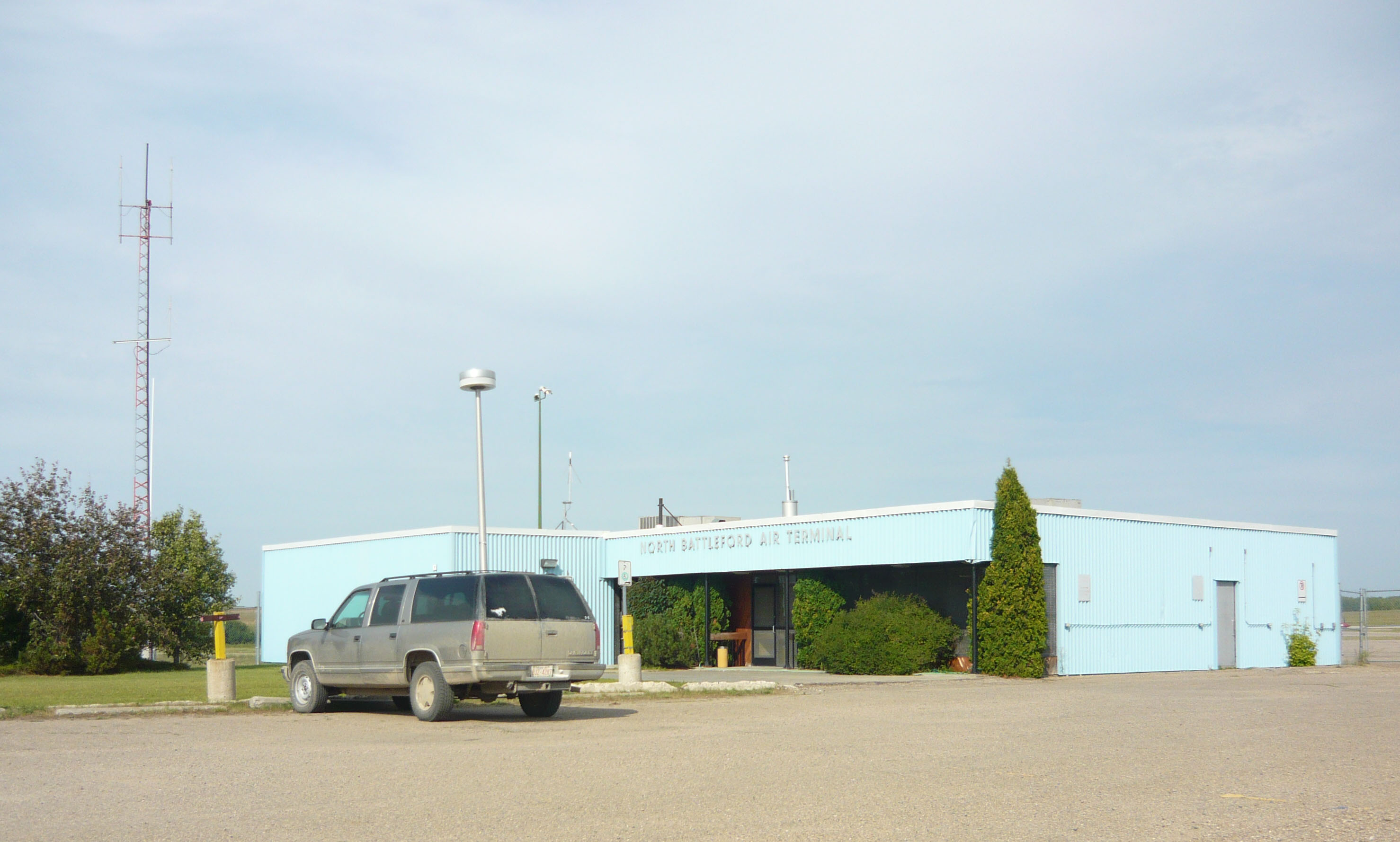
Terminal building

Postwar it became known as North Battleford (Cameron McIntosh) after Cameron Ross McIntosh. It was transferred from Transport Canada to the City of North Battleford on January 1, 1997. In April 2010 a contract was awarded for renovations to the air terminal building.

=== Present (2010- ) ===
The North Battleford Gliding Centre, a Royal Canadian Air Cadets gliding centre, stores its gliders outside in permanent tie downs, and has office space in a trailer. The gliding centre conducts winch and air-tow operations in both the spring and the fall. The gliding centre currently operates two gliders, one winch, and one Bellanca Scout Towplane. Runway 06/24 was removed from the CFS and as of Feb 2024 only runway 12/30 remains.

== See also ==
- List of airports in Saskatchewan
- North Battleford/Hamlin Airport
