= North Battleford =

City in Saskatchewan, Canada

- City
- City of North Battleford
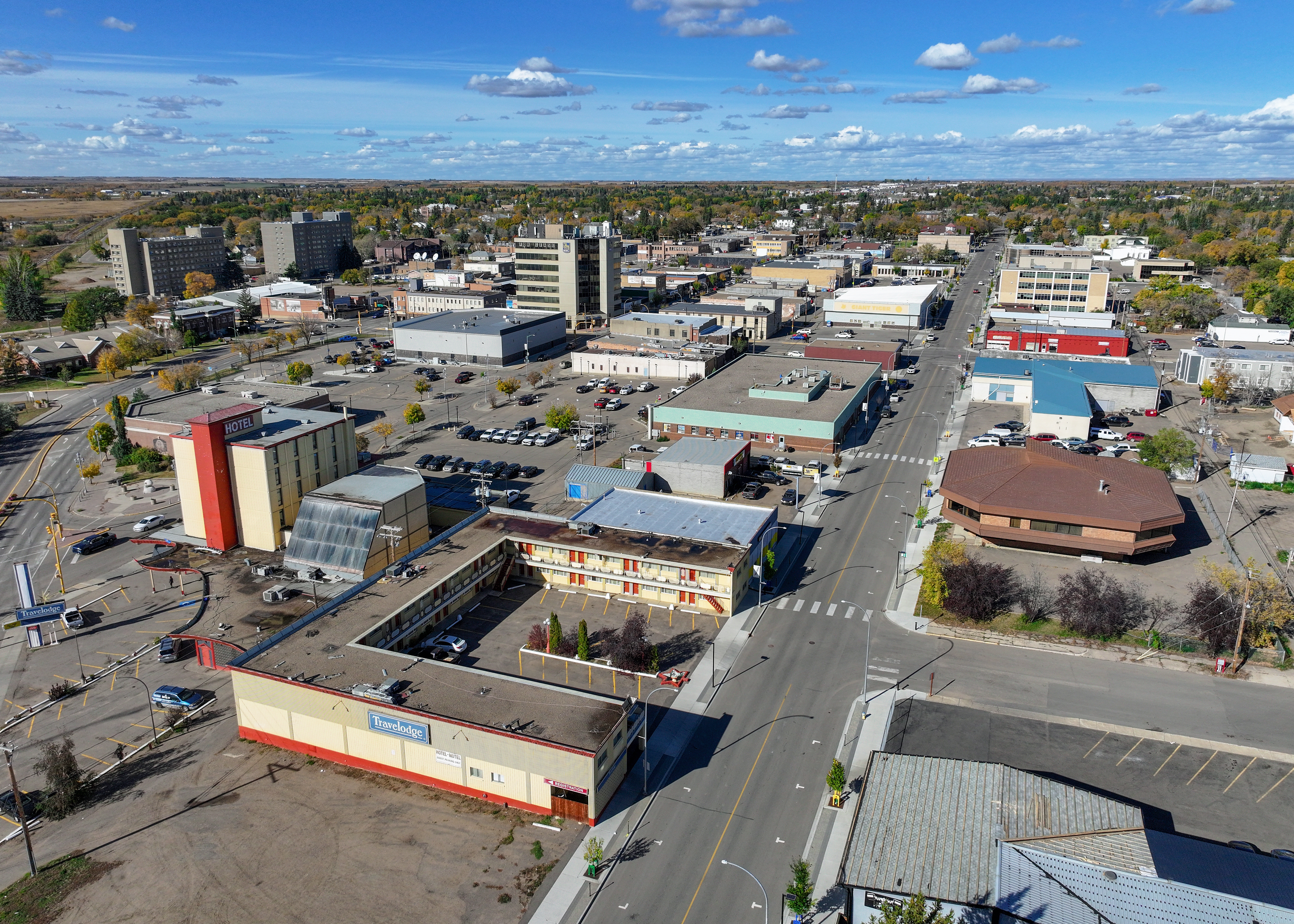
- Downtown

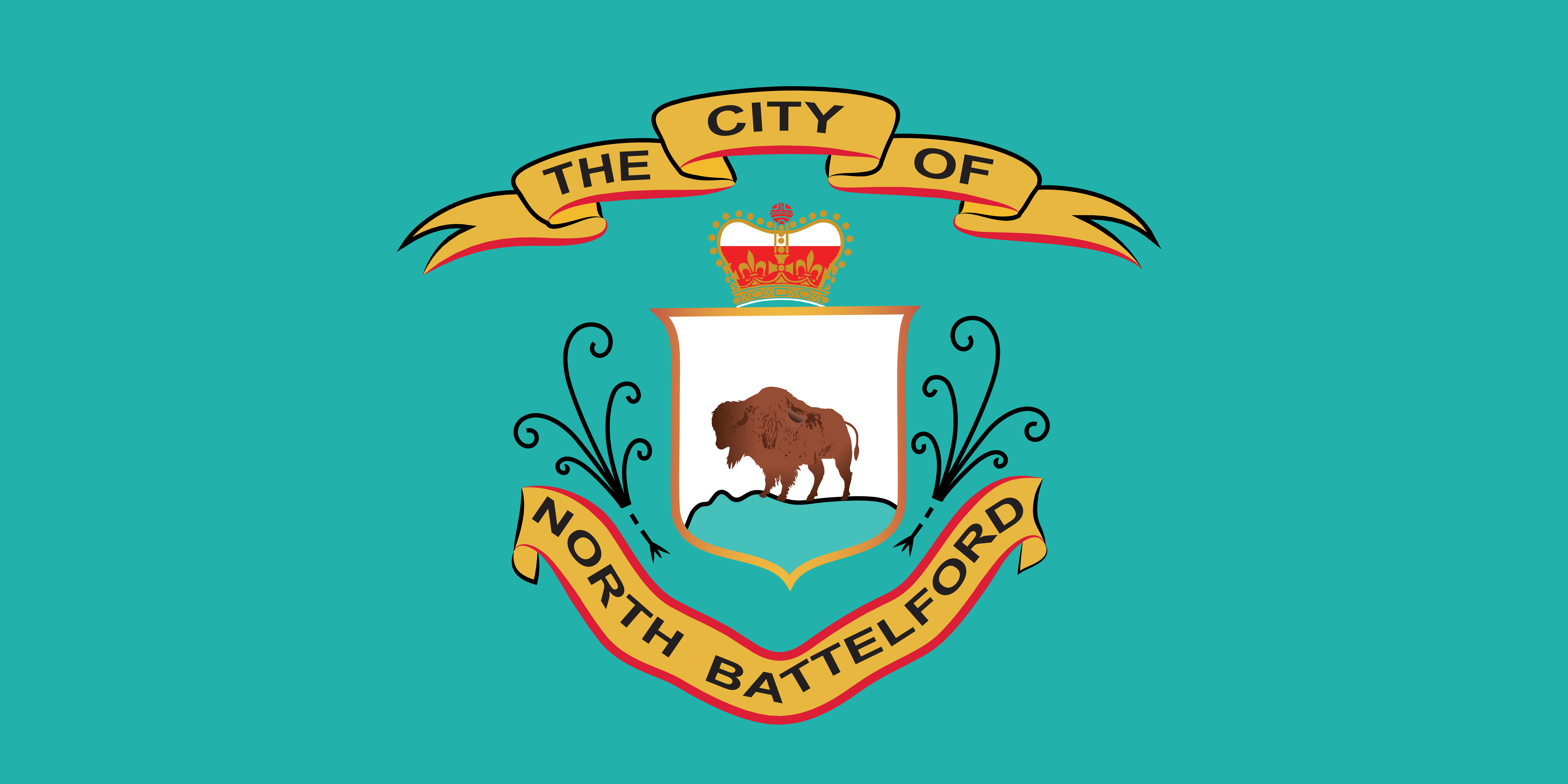
- Flag Logo

- Location within Saskatchewan Location within Canada
- Coordinates: 52°45′27″N 108°17′10″W
- Country: Canada
- Province: Saskatchewan
- Census division: 16
- Village: 1906
- Town: 1907
- City: 1913

Government
  - Mayor: Kelli Hawtin
  - MLA: Jeremy Cockrill (SKP)
  - MP: Rosemarie Falk (CON)

Area
  - Land: 33.55 km^{2} (12.95 sq mi)
  - Urban: 8.67 km^{2} (3.35 sq mi)
  - Metro: 1,118.54 km^{2} (431.87 sq mi)

Population (2021)
  - Total: 13,836
  - Density: 412.4/km^{2} (1,068/sq mi)
  - Urban: 13,649
  - Urban density: 1,575.2/km^{2} (4,080/sq mi)
  - Metro: 19,374
  - Metro density: 17.3/km^{2} (45/sq mi)
- Time zone: UTC−6 (CST)
- Postal code FSA: S9A
- Area codes: 306, 639
- Website: www.cityofnb.ca

North Battleford is a city in west-central Saskatchewan, Canada. It is the seventh largest city in the province and is directly across the North Saskatchewan River from the town of Battleford. Together, the two communities are known as "The Battlefords".

North Battleford and the greater Battlefords area are a notable stop along the Yellowhead Highway, part of the Trans-Canada system, and serve as a commercial and cultural hub for west- and north-central Saskatchewan. Together, the Battlefords are served by the Yellowhead Highway as well as Highway 4, Highway 26, Highway 29, and Highway 40.

Battlefords Provincial Park is 40 kilometres (25 mi) north on Highway 4.

== History ==
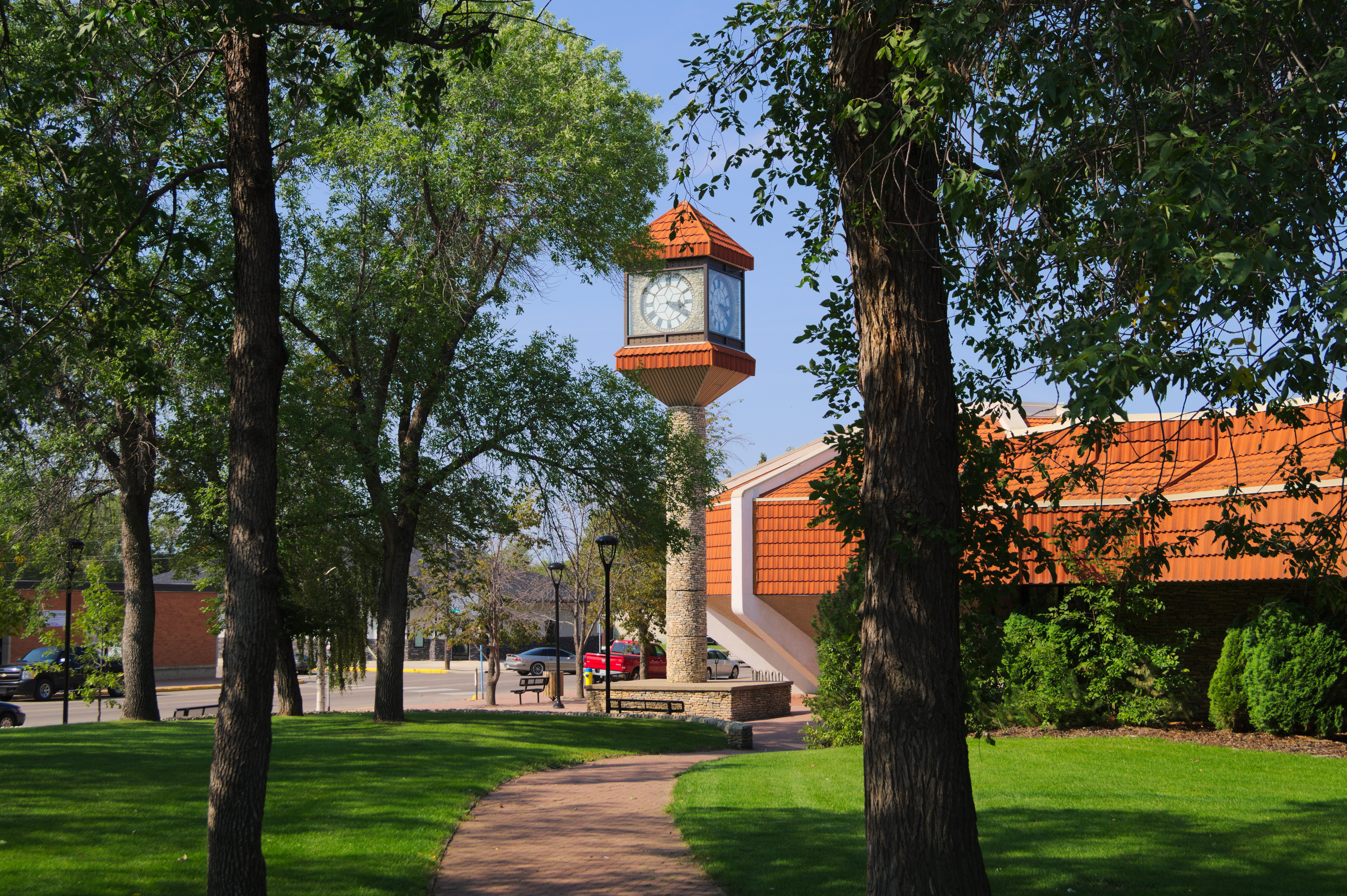
Library Clock as seen from Central Park

For thousands of years prior to European settlement, succeeding cultures of indigenous peoples lived in the area. The Battlefords area was home to several historic indigenous groups, including the Algonquian-speaking Cree and Blackfeet as well as Siouan Assiniboine First Nation band governments, who contested for control of local resources.

Early European settlement began as a result of fur trading by French colonists in the late 18th century. The Canadians founded Fort Montaigne d'Aigle (Eagle Hills Fort) nine miles below the confluence of the North Saskatchewan and Battle Rivers in 1778. A year later the fort was abandoned following conflict between traders and natives.

Permanent European settlement in the area centred around the town of Battleford, founded 1875 and located on the south side of the North Saskatchewan River. Battleford served as capital of the North-West Territories between 1876 and 1883.

In 1905, the construction of the Canadian Northern Railway main line to Edmonton placed the line on the north side of the North Saskatchewan River. North Battleford, built along the railway line, was incorporated as a village in 1906, as a town in 1907, and as a city (with a population of 5,000) in 1913.

The Assyrians were one of the first settlers of the area in and around North Battleford. The immigrant colony comprised 36 men and a few women from the town of Urmia in northwestern Persia. It was established in 1903 by Dr. Isaac Adams, an Assyrian Presbyterian missionary. In 1907, 40 more settlers arrived. Eventually, due to economic hardships, Dr. Isaac Adams and a few close relatives emigrated to Turlock, California. The descendants of the families who remained in North Battleford have names that are Assyrian in origin. Examples of Assyrian family names include Bakus, Essau, George and Odishaw.

Population growth stagnated until the 1940s and then grew to approximately 10,000 by the 1960s. The city has grown into an administrative centre and service hub for the economic, education, health and social needs of the region.

North Battleford used STV-PR in its city elections from 1920 to 1924.

The Latter Rain Revival, a Christian movement, started here in 1946–48.

=== Historic sites ===
A number of heritage buildings are located within the city. The North Battleford Public Library was built in 1916 with a $15,000 grant from the Carnegie Foundation of New York. and the Canadian National Railways Station was built in 1956.

== Geography ==
North Battleford is situated immediately north of the mouth of the Battle River along the North Saskatchewan River. It borders the Rural Municipality of North Battleford No. 437, as well as the North Battleford Crown Colony (census subdivision).

=== Climate ===
North Battleford experiences a humid continental climate (Köppen climate classification Dfb). The average high during the end of July is 24.6 °C (76.3 °F) and the average low is 11.3 °C (52.3 °F). For the middle of January the average high is −12.3 °C (9.9 °F) and the average low is −22.6 °C (−8.7 °F).

The highest temperature ever recorded in North Battleford was 39.5 °C (103.1 °F) on 13 July 2002. The coldest temperature ever recorded was −51.7 °C (−61 °F) on 1 February 1893 and 12 January 1916.

Climate data for North Battleford (North Battleford Airport) WMO ID: 71876; coordinates 52°46′19″N 108°15′20″W; elevation: 548.3 m (1,799 ft); 1991–2020 normals, (Note: Rain, snow, days with rain, and days with snow annually and for December are not available,) extremes 1879–present (Note: Climate data was recorded in the city of Battleford from November 1879 to March 1942, and at North Battleford Airport from March 1942 to present.)
Month	Jan	Feb	Mar	Apr	May	Jun	Jul	Aug	Sep	Oct	Nov	Dec	Year
Record high humidex	10.7	10.1	19.3	30.0	36.9	41.5	42.9	40.7	36.9	30.0	19.3	10.4	42.9
Record high °C (°F)	10.8 (51.4)	10.4 (50.7)	19.3 (66.7)	32.2 (90.0)	34.9 (94.8)	37.8 (100.0)	39.5 (103.1)	38.3 (100.9)	36.5 (97.7)	30.0 (86.0)	19.5 (67.1)	10.9 (51.6)	39.5 (103.1)
Mean daily maximum °C (°F)	−10.1 (13.8)	−7.8 (18.0)	−1.2 (29.8)	9.9 (49.8)	18.0 (64.4)	21.7 (71.1)	24.3 (75.7)	23.7 (74.7)	18.5 (65.3)	9.4 (48.9)	−1.4 (29.5)	−8.4 (16.9)	8.1 (46.6)
Daily mean °C (°F)	−15.3 (4.5)	−13.3 (8.1)	−6.6 (20.1)	3.3 (37.9)	10.5 (50.9)	15.1 (59.2)	17.6 (63.7)	16.6 (61.9)	11.3 (52.3)	3.3 (37.9)	−6.3 (20.7)	−13.4 (7.9)	1.9 (35.4)
Mean daily minimum °C (°F)	−20.6 (−5.1)	−18.9 (−2.0)	−12.0 (10.4)	−3.3 (26.1)	3.0 (37.4)	8.5 (47.3)	10.8 (51.4)	9.4 (48.9)	4.1 (39.4)	−2.8 (27.0)	−11.1 (12.0)	−18.4 (−1.1)	−4.3 (24.3)
Record low °C (°F)	−51.7 (−61.1)	−51.7 (−61.1)	−38.4 (−37.1)	−27.8 (−18.0)	−13.2 (8.2)	−2.9 (26.8)	1.6 (34.9)	−1.8 (28.8)	−10.3 (13.5)	−27.2 (−17.0)	−35.8 (−32.4)	−44.2 (−47.6)	−51.7 (−61.1)
Record low wind chill	−55.3	−54.6	−48.2	−35.8	−16.4	−5.4	0.0	−3.9	−14.0	−29.6	−41.1	−51.7	−55.3
Average precipitation mm (inches)	18.9 (0.74)	14.2 (0.56)	12.9 (0.51)	25.0 (0.98)	30.6 (1.20)	60.1 (2.37)	77.4 (3.05)	50.7 (2.00)	28.4 (1.12)	20.4 (0.80)	20.8 (0.82)	23.8 (0.94)	383.2 (15.09)
Average rainfall mm (inches)	0.2 (0.01)	0.6 (0.02)	2.6 (0.10)	16.5 (0.65)	29.5 (1.16)	65.7 (2.59)	72.5 (2.85)	55.5 (2.19)	32.0 (1.26)	11.1 (0.44)	2.3 (0.09)	—	—
Average snowfall cm (inches)	21.1 (8.3)	13.7 (5.4)	14.2 (5.6)	11.4 (4.5)	2.0 (0.8)	0.0 (0.0)	0.0 (0.0)	0.0 (0.0)	0.9 (0.4)	8.5 (3.3)	16.8 (6.6)	—	—
Average precipitation days (≥ 0.2 mm)	12.2	10.1	8.6	9.8	9.0	13.0	12.9	9.9	7.7	8.3	11.4	12.8	125.6
Average rainy days (≥ 0.2 mm)	0.56	0.38	1.2	6.0	8.1	12.7	12.6	9.5	7.8	5.0	0.73	—	—
Average snowy days (≥ 0.2 cm)	10.5	6.7	6.8	4.1	0.63	0.12	0.0	0.0	0.19	3.1	7.4	—	—
Average relative humidity (%) (at 1500 LST)	72.8	71.6	66.1	46.8	38.4	48.0	51.0	47.5	45.2	53.5	70.2	74.4	57.1
Source: Environment and Climate Change Canada (January extreme minimum) (February extreme minimum)

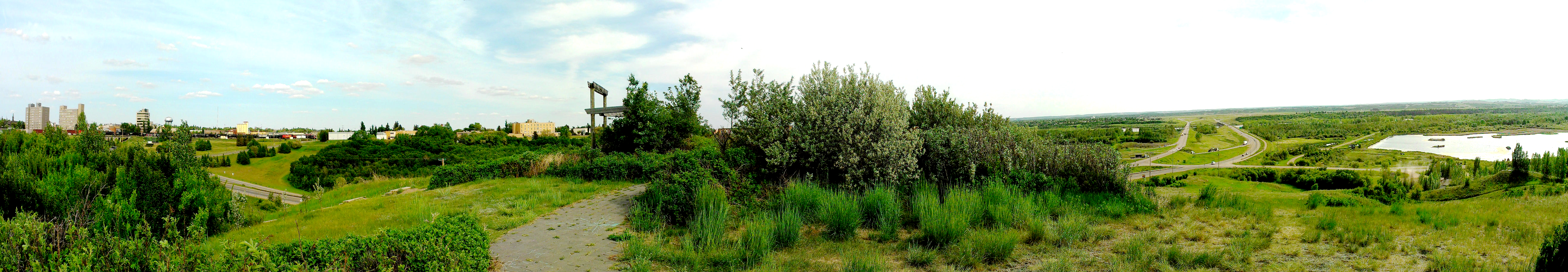
View of North Battleford from King Hill showing the Yellowhead Highway leading to Battleford.

== Demographics ==
In the 2021 Census of Population conducted by Statistics Canada, North Battleford had a population of 13,836 living in 5,696 of its 6,346 total private dwellings, a change of −3.3% from its 2016 population of 14,315. With a land area of 33.55 km^{2} (12.95 sq mi), it had a population density of 412.4/km^{2} (1,068.1/sq mi) in 2021.

Canada census – North Battleford community profile

	2021	2016	2011
Population	13,836 (-3.3% from 2016)	14,315 (+3.1% from 2011)	13,888 (+5.3% from 2006)
Land area	33.55 km^{2} (12.95 sq mi)	33.55 km^{2} (12.95 sq mi)	33.55 km^{2} (12.95 sq mi)
Population density	412.4/km^{2} (1,068/sq mi)	426.7/km^{2} (1,105/sq mi)	414.0/km^{2} (1,072/sq mi)
Median age	38.4 (M: 36.8, F: 39.2)	37.4 (M: 36.2, F: 38.5)	36.9 (M: 35.5, F: 38.3)
Private dwellings	6,346 (total) 5,696 (occupied)	6,413 (total) 5,896 (occupied)	6,195 (total)
Median household income	$74,000	$62,391

References: 2021 2016 2011

Historical census populations – North Battleford

Year	Pop.	±%
1911	2,105	—
1921	4,108	+95.2%
1931	5,986	+45.7%
1941	4,694	−21.6%
1951	7,473	+59.2%

Year	Pop.	±%
1961	11,230	+50.3%
1971	12,698	+13.1%
1981	14,030	+10.5%
1991	14,350	+2.3%
2001	13,692	−4.6%

Year	Pop.	±%
2006	13,190	−3.7%
2011	13,888	+5.3%
2016	14,315	+3.1%
2021	13,836	−3.3%

Source: Statistics Canada

=== Ethnicity ===
In the late 2000s many Ruthenians have emigrated to Canada, concentrating in North Battleford. Most of them came from the same town: Ruski Krstur.

Panethnic groups in the City of North Battleford (2001−2021)
Panethnic group	2021		2016		2011		2006		2001	
Panethnic group	Pop.	%	Pop.	%	Pop.	%	Pop.	%	Pop.	%
European (Note: Statistic includes all persons that did not make up part of a visible minority or an indigenous identity.)	7,725	57.26%	8,430	60.43%	9,585	70.3%	9,600	74.02%	10,575	78.33%
Indigenous	3,590	26.61%	4,010	28.75%	3,170	23.25%	3,170	24.44%	2,660	19.7%
Southeast Asian (Note: Statistic includes total responses of "Filipino" and "Southeast Asian" under visible minority section on census.)	1,120	8.3%	785	5.63%	335	2.46%	20	0.15%	70	0.52%
South Asian	465	3.45%	285	2.04%	125	0.92%	55	0.42%	40	0.3%
African	220	1.63%	55	0.39%	160	1.17%	85	0.66%	65	0.48%
East Asian (Note: Statistic includes total responses of "Chinese", "Korean", and "Japanese" under visible minority section on census.)	185	1.37%	245	1.76%	210	1.54%	45	0.35%	80	0.59%
Latin American	125	0.93%	70	0.5%	40	0.29%	0	0%	10	0.07%
Middle Eastern (Note: Statistic includes total responses of "West Asian" and "Arab" under visible minority section on census.)	0	0%	10	0.07%	0	0%	0	0%	0	0%
Other/multiracial (Note: Statistic includes total responses of "Visible minority, n.i.e." and "Multiple visible minorities" under visible minority section on census.)	60	0.44%	70	0.5%	0	0%	0	0%	0	0%
Total responses	13,490	97.5%	13,950	97.45%	13,635	98.18%	12,970	98.33%	13,500	98.6%
Total population	13,836	100%	14,315	100%	13,888	100%	13,190	100%	13,692	100%
Note: Totals greater than 100% due to multiple origin responses

=== Crime rate ===
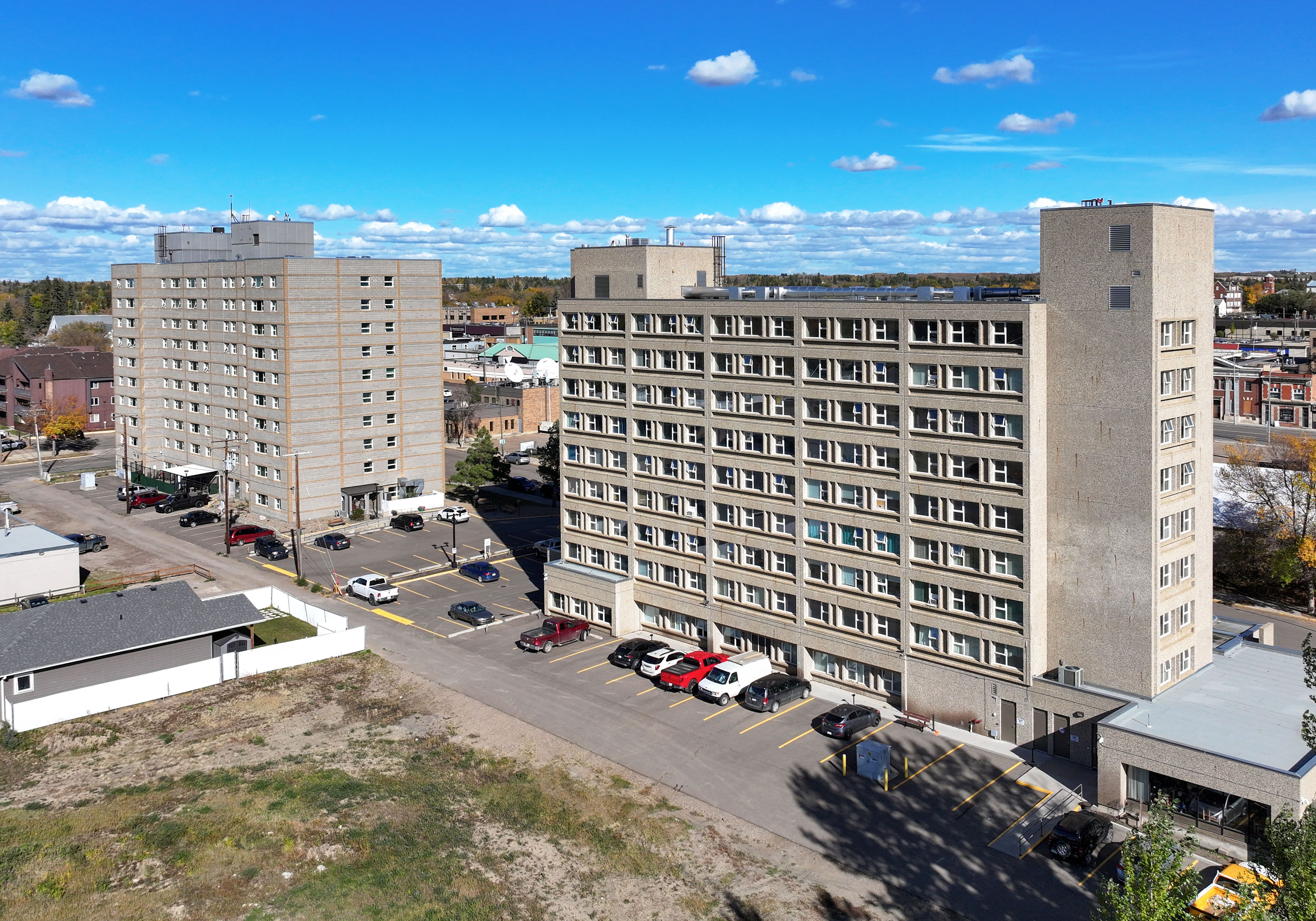
Residents of Valleyview Towers often report disturbances, harassment, loud parties, and intoxicated individuals entering hallways.

In 2018, Maclean's ranked North Battleford as Canada's most dangerous place for overall crime. The prior year, Maclean's published an article about this, Canada's most dangerous place, North Battleford, is fighting for its future, discussing the safety initiatives planned by the community.

After the article was published, Mayor Ryan Bater said:

The reality is we require the provincial and federal levels of government to take notice of this and align their efforts with ours. This needs to be a partnership. This can't be something the governments do in silos and we need to be working together. If we can do that, then sometime in the future we can see some great results.

City Manager Jim Puffalt added that the per person index may not be accurate because the population data does not consider the numerous transients, estimated at just over 14,000. In his view, the city has roughly 30,000 people at any time. "If you put our rates over 30,000 people we wouldn't be number one [in the Maclean's study]," he said.

In 2023, North Battleford earned its highest position on the Crime Severity Index (CSI) since 1998, with the city challenging the dubious 'Crime Town' moniker.

== Government ==
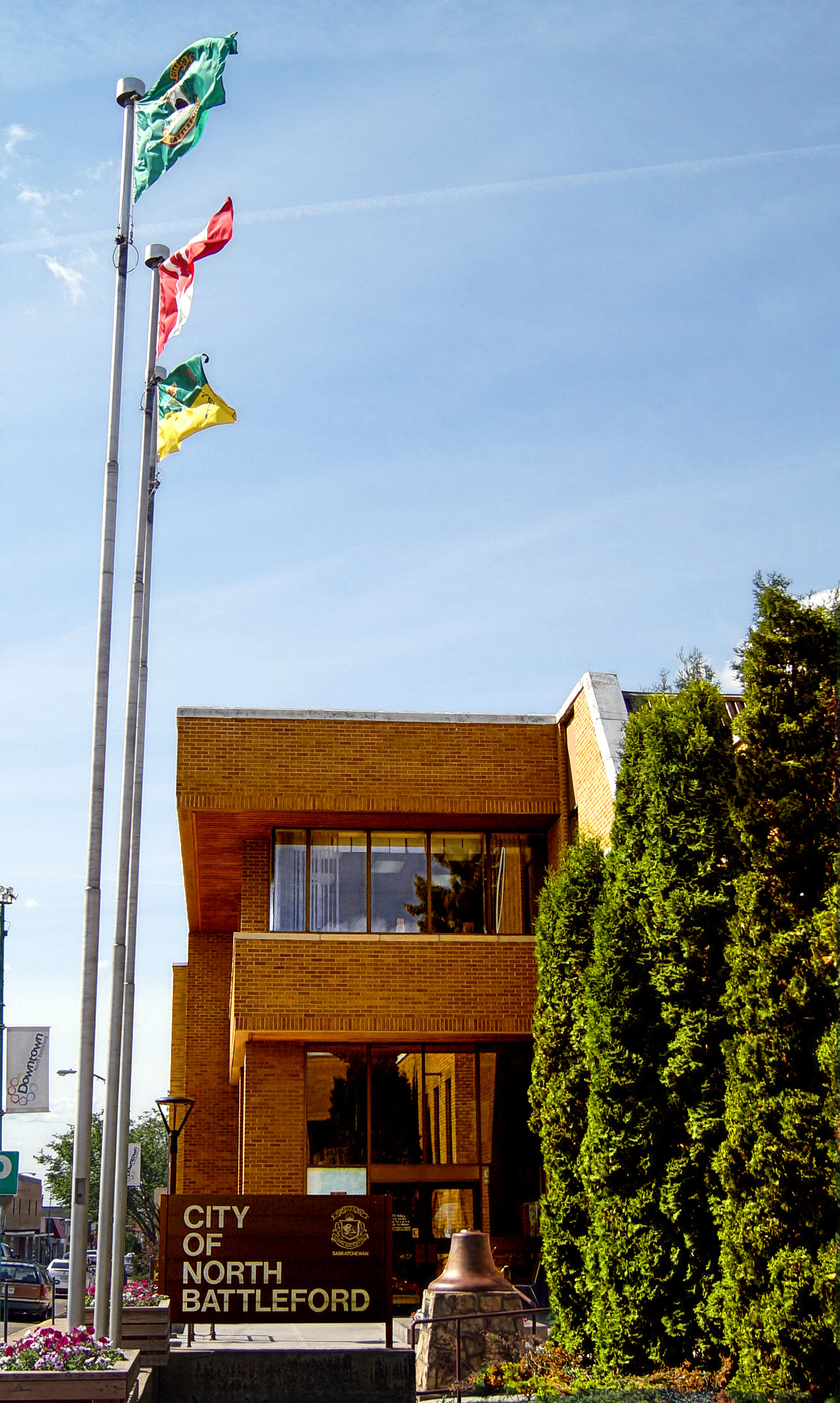
North Battleford City Hall

North Battleford is represented in the provincial Legislative Assembly by the member for The Battlefords.

It is represented in the House of Commons by the member for Battlefords-Lloydminster.

== Attractions ==
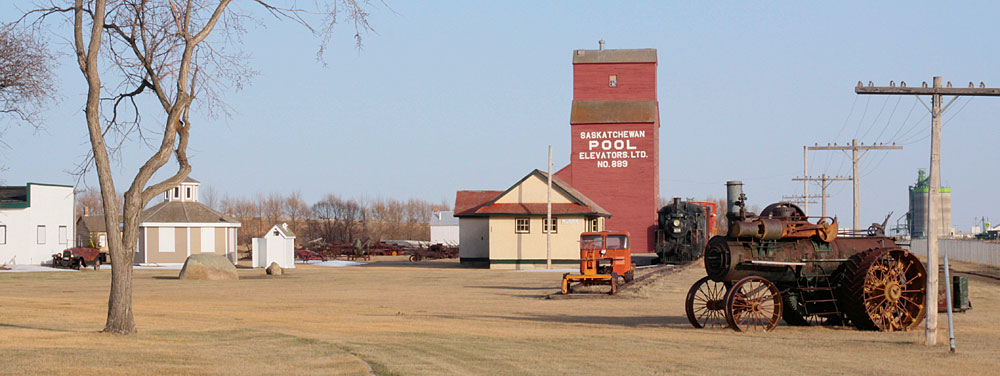
Pioneer village at the Saskatchewan Western Development Museum in North Battleford

North Battleford is the home of one of four branches of the Saskatchewan Western Development Museum. This branch focuses on the agricultural history of Saskatchewan, including a pioneer village. A prominent feature is the former Saskatchewan Wheat Pool grain elevator No. 889 from Keatley, Saskatchewan. The grain elevator was moved to the museum grounds in 1983.

The city also has the Allen Sapp Gallery, featuring the noted Cree painter.

Finlayson Island Nature Park is on Finlayson Island, adjacent to North Battleford. Access is from the old north Battleford Bridge.

== Sports and recreation ==
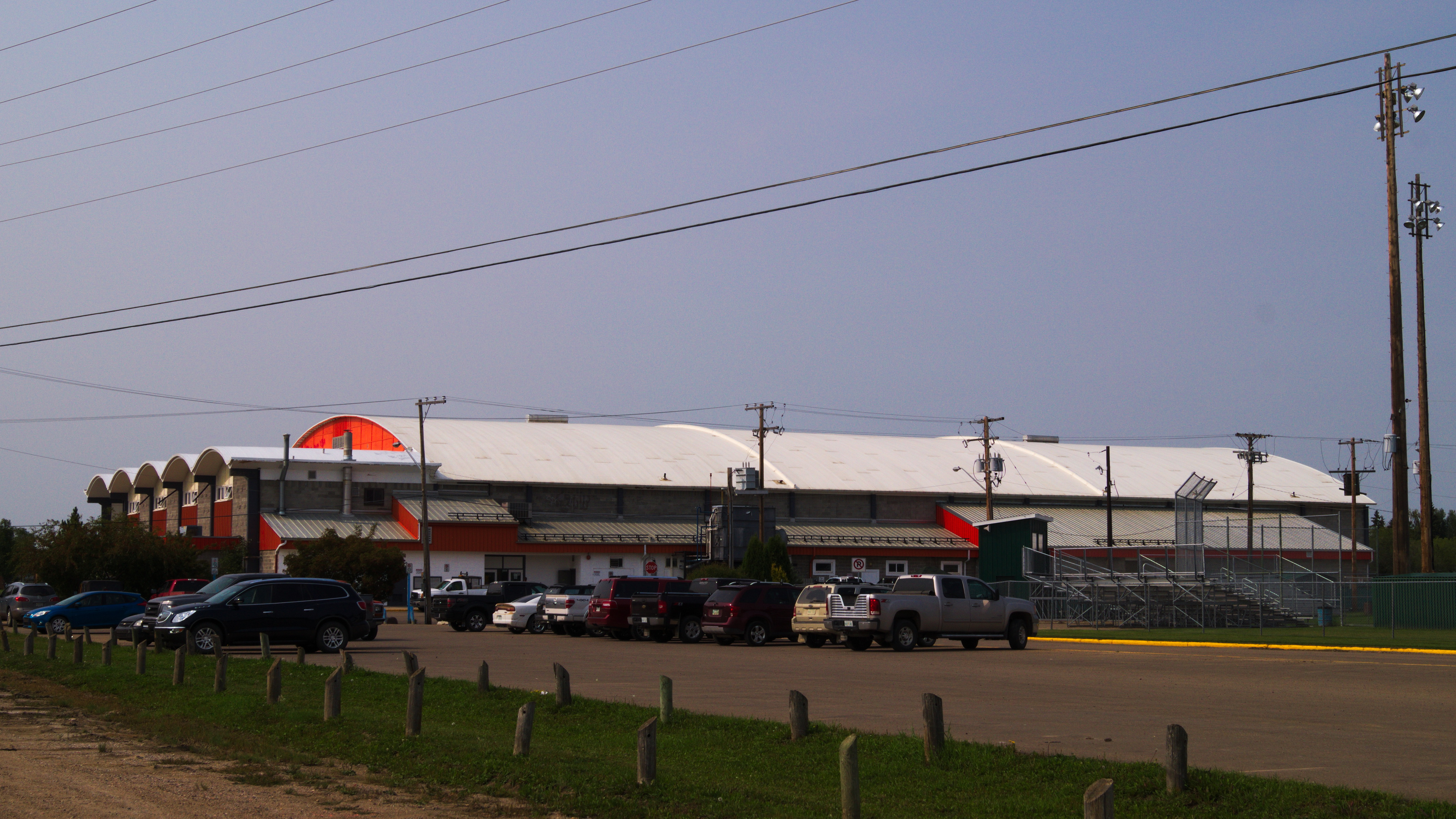
North Battleford Civic Centre

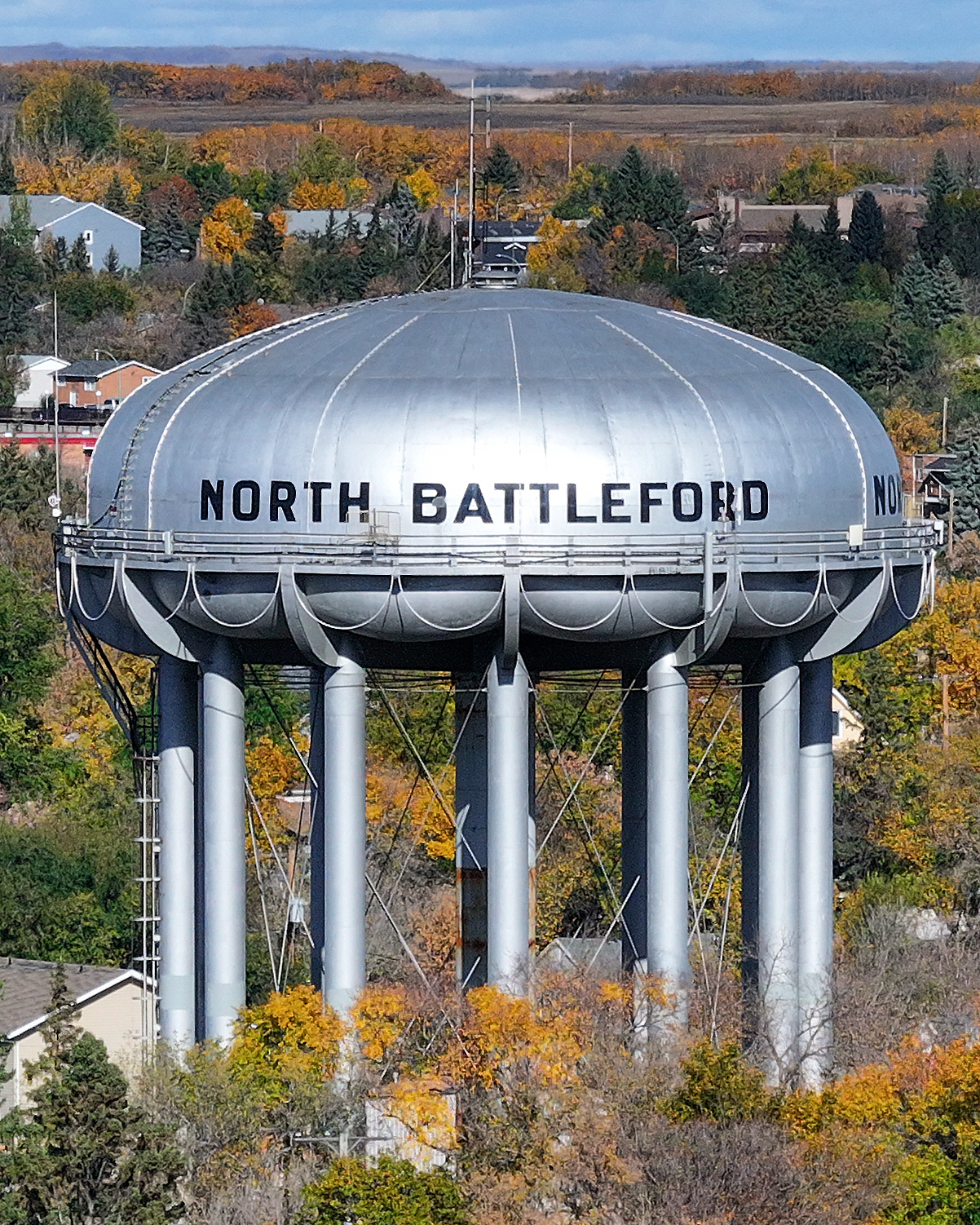
Water Tower (b. 1949)

The North Battleford Access Communications Centre, a 2,500-seat multi-purpose arena, is home to the Battlefords North Stars ice hockey team of the Saskatchewan Junior Hockey League. It is also home to the North Battleford Kinsmen Indoor Rodeo, held annually in April.

The InnovationPlex (formerly North Battleford CUplex), which opened in 2013, includes the Dekker Centre for the Performing Arts, the Northland Power Curling Centre, the NationsWest Field House, and the Battlefords CO-OP Aquatic Centre.

== Infrastructure ==
In 2001, a problem with the city's water system led to the infection of approximately 6,280 people with cryptosporidiosis; a lawsuit seeking several million dollars in damages was filed in 2003. Between 5,800 and 7,100 people suffered from diarrheal illness, and 1,907 cases of cryptosporidiosis were confirmed. Equipment failures at the city's antiquated water filtration plant following maintenance were found to have caused the outbreak. The provincial and municipal government offered compensation to victims after the lawsuit was approved in 2017.

The North Battleford Energy Centre, a natural gas-fired power station owned by Northland Power, has been operational since 2013.

=== Transportation ===
North Battleford is served by the North Battleford Airport, while the North Battleford/Hamlin Airport is no longer in use. The city also recently added a public transit system, in addition to the book-as-needed "Handi-bus" for people with disabilities.

== Local media ==
=== Newspaper ===
BattlefordsNOW.com is an online local news site focusing on what's happening "right NOW" in the Battlefords and surrounding area.

The local newspaper is the Battlefords' News-Optimist. It is published weekly on Thursdays and has circulation in the surrounding area.

Feed The Artist Magazine is a local non-profit periodical print and online publication that features the work of primarily local artists, photographers, and writers.

=== Radio ===
Three local radio stations serve the area: CJNB, CJCQ-FM ("Q98"), and CJHD-FM ("93.3 Beach Radio"). Some Saskatoon radio stations can also be received.

=== Television ===
The Battlefords were served by CFQC-TV-2 channel 6, an analogue repeater of CTV station CFQC-DT Saskatoon. That repeater ended all analog broadcasting transmissions in 2021, and there are no plans for converting it to digital television.

== Notable people ==
- Andrew Albers: baseball player
- Lloyd Axworthy: Canadian politician and spokesman
- Wade Belak: former NHL player
- Colby Cave: former NHL player
- Perry J. Dahl: United States Air Force colonel and a World War II flying ace
- Ron Delorme: former NHL player
- Deidra Dionne: Canadian freestyle skier, Olympic medalist
- Lillian Dyck: Neuroscientist, Canadian senator
- Johnny Esaw: former sports' broadcaster, former vice-president of CTV Sports
- Bob Francis: former NHL player, NHL coach
- Emile Francis: former NHL player, coach, and general manager
- Ray Hare: former NFL running back
- Kenneth Nowakowski: Eastern Catholic bishop
- Bruce Hoffort: former NHL Goaltender
- Dale Hoganson: former NHL player
- Bill Hunter: hockey coach, owner, and general manager; founder of the Western Hockey League
- Carole James: politician, former leader of the British Columbia New Democratic Party, Deputy Premier of British Columbia
- Dave King: NHL coach
- Skip Krake: former NHL centre
- Jody Lehman: former EIHL goalie
- Bernie Lukowich: former NHL player
- Alistair MacLeod: author
- Merlin Malinowski: former NHL right winger
- Rueben Mayes: former NFL player
- Joni Mitchell: musician, artist
- Nancy Nash: Singer and Performer
- Lee Richardson: Canadian politician
- Allen Sapp: Canadian Cree painter
- Corey Schwab: former NHL goalie
- Gregg Sheppard: former NHL forward
- Fiona Lesley Smith: Member of the Canada women's national ice hockey team
- Herbert Sparrow: former Canadian senator
- Len Taylor: former Saskatchewan cabinet minister and federal MP
- Al Tuer: former NHL defenceman
- Jesse Wallin: former NHL defenceman, WJC Gold Medallist, WHL GM/Head Coach
- W. Brett Wilson: Entrepreneur and Philanthropist
- Chase Wouters: AHL centre
