= RCAF Station Moncton =

WWII training air station of the BCATP

- Near Moncton, New Brunswick in Canada

Site information
- Owner: Dept of National Defence (Canada)

Location
- Coordinates: 46°06′N 64°41′W

Airfield information
- Elevation: 230 ft (70 m) AMSL
Runways
Direction	Length and surface
2/20	3,370 ft (1,030 m) Hard Surface
2/20	2,770 ft (840 m) Hard Surface
7/25	4,150 ft (1,260 m) Hard Surface
7/25	2,285 ft (696 m) Hard Surface
11/29	4,150 ft (1,260 m) Hard Surface
11/29	2,285 ft (696 m) Hard Surface

RCAF Station Moncton or RCAF Aerodrome Moncton or BCATP Station Moncton, was a Second World War training air station of the British Commonwealth Air Training Plan (BCATP). It was located east of Moncton, New Brunswick, Canada.

== History ==
=== World War II ===
The Moncton aerodrome was the home of No. 8 Service Flying Training School RCAF which operated from 23 December 1940 until the school was relocated to RCAF Station Weyburn 24 January 1944.

==== Aerodrome information ====
In approximately 1942 the aerodrome was listed as RCAF Aerodrome - Moncton, New Brunswick at 46°06′N 64°41′W with a variation of 23 degrees west and elevation of 230 ft (70 m). Six runways were listed as follows:

Runway Name	Length	Width	Surface
2/20	3,370 ft (1,030 m)	150 ft (46 m)	Hard surfaced
2/20	2,770 ft (840 m)	100 ft (30 m)	Hard surfaced
11/29	4,000 ft (1,200 m)	200 ft (61 m)	Hard surfaced
11/29	2,575 ft (785 m)	100 ft (30 m)	Hard surfaced
7/25	4,150 ft (1,260 m)	150 ft (46 m)	Hard surfaced
7/25	2,285 ft (696 m)	100 ft (30 m)	Hard surfaced

==== Relief landing field - Scoudouc ====
The primary relief landing field for RCAF Station Moncton was located west of the community of Scoudouc, New Brunswick. In approximately 1942 the aerodrome was listed as RCAF Aerodrome - Scoudouc, New Brunswick at 46°10′N 64°34′W with a variation of 24 degrees west and elevation of 180 ft (55 m). Three runways were listed as follows:

Runway Name	Length	Width	Surface
16/34	2,520 ft (770 m)	100 ft (30 m)	Hard Surfaced
7/25	5,000 ft (1,500 m)	200 ft (61 m)	Hard Surfaced
12/30	2,942 ft (897 m)	100 ft (30 m)	Hard Surfaced

==== Relief landing field - Salisbury ====
The secondary relief landing field for RCAF Station Moncton was located northwest of the community of Salisbury, New Brunswick. In approximately 1942 the aerodrome was listed as RCAF Aerodrome - Salisbury, New Brunswick at 46°03′N 65°04′W with a variation of 23 degrees west and elevation of 225 ft (69 m). Three runways were listed as follows:

Runway Name	Length	Width	Surface
7/25	3,100 ft (940 m)	1,100 ft (340 m)	Turf
13/31	3,200 ft (980 m)	700 ft (210 m)	Turf
18/36	3,200 ft (980 m)	800 ft (240 m)	Turf

=== Postwar ===
After the second world war, the property was converted into a civilian airport and is now operated as the Greater Moncton Roméo LeBlanc International Airport
