= North Battleford/Hamlin Airport =

Former airfield in Saskatchewan, Canada

- IATA: none; ICAO: none; TC LID: ~~CJD4~~

Summary
- Airport type: ~~Private~~
- Operator: ~~Battlefords' Airspray~~
- Location: RM of North Battleford No. 437, near Hamlin, Saskatchewan
- Time zone: CST (UTC−06:00)
- Elevation AMSL: 1,800 ft (550 m)
- Coordinates: 52°52′48″N 108°17′19″W

Map
- Location in Saskatchewan CJD4 (Canada)

Runways
Direction	Length		Surface
Direction	ft	m	Surface
~~05/23~~	~~2,400~~	~~732~~	~~Asphalt~~
~~11/29~~	~~2,400~~	~~732~~	~~Asphalt~~
- Source: Canada Flight Supplement

North Battleford/Hamlin Airport ~~(TC LID: CJD4)~~ was located 1 nautical mile (1.9 km; 1.2 mi) north-east of Hamlin, Saskatchewan, Canada, in the RM of North Battleford No. 437.

== History ==
This airfield was built under the British Commonwealth Air Training Plan during World War II as the R1 — primary relief field — for RCAF Station North Battleford. Pilots trained here using Airspeed Oxford aircraft; it is listed as operating from 4 September 1941 to 30 March 1945.

=== Aerodrome ===
The RCAF Aerodrome at Hamlin was the relief landing field for RCAF Station North Battleford, and was located approximately 7 miles (11 km) north of the main aerodrome. The site was located north-east of the community of Hamlin, Saskatchewan. The Relief field was constructed in the typical triangular pattern.

In approximately 1942 the aerodrome was listed as RCAF Aerodrome - Hamlin, Saskatchewan at 52°53′N 108°17′W with a variation of 22 degrees east and elevation of 1,779 ft (542 m). Six runways were listed as follows:

Runway name	Length	Width	Surface
5/23	2,750 ft (840 m)	100 ft (30 m)	Hard surfaced
5/23	2,850 ft (870 m)	100 ft (30 m)	Hard surfaced
17/35	2,750 ft (840 m)	100 ft (30 m)	Hard surfaced
17/35	2,850 ft (870 m)	100 ft (30 m)	Hard surfaced
11/29	2,750 ft (840 m)	100 ft (30 m)	Hard surfaced
11/29	2,850 ft (870 m)	100 ft (30 m)	Hard surfaced

A review of Google Maps on 7 June 2018 shows clear visibility of the outer runways of the airfield. There is, however, no visibility of the inner runways. The c.1942 indicate a location on the visible triangle.

== Post-war, 1945–2007 ==
More recently, one runway continued to be maintained for use in agricultural flight training by Battlefords Airspray.

== 2007–present ==
As of 15 March 2007, this airport is not usable and has been removed from the Canada Flight Supplement.

== See also ==
- List of airports in Saskatchewan
- North Battleford Airport
- List of defunct airports in Canada
