= No. 8 Service Flying Training School RCAF =

- Active: 23 December 1940-30 June 1944
- Country: Canada
- Branch: Royal Canadian Air Force
- Role: Service Flying Training
- Part of: No. 3 Training Command RCAF
- Garrison/HQ: RCAF Station Moncton Dec 1940-Jan 1944; RCAF Station Weyburn Jan 1944-Jun 1944

No. 8 Service Flying Training School RCAF was a flight training squadron in 3 Training Command, of the British Commonwealth Air Training Plan (BCATP), flying Avro Ansons from RCAF Station Moncton, New Brunswick. The school was opened 23 December 1940. The school was relocated to RCAF Station Weyburn, Saskatchewan on 24 January 1944 and was disbanded 30 June 1944.

RCAF Eastern Air Command was the part of the Royal Canadian Air Force's Home War Establishment responsible for air operations on the Atlantic coast of Canada during the Second World War, including BCATP flight schools. Many of its assigned training schools conducted advanced flying courses including Service Flying Training (SFTS), Air Observer (AOS), Bombing and Gunnery (BGS), General Reconnaissance (ocean patrol) (GRS), Naval Aerial Gunnery (NAGS), Air Navigation (ANS) and Operational (OTU) training throughout the war. Together with some advanced aircraft types these units mainly flew older bomber and patrol aircraft that had been removed from active service.

These schools were not part of the Order of Battle of RCAF Eastern Air Command. However, 3 Training Command aircraft were very active over the entire Eastern Command Area of Operations. They made an important contribution to the surveillance of the region as a force multiplier, providing extra eyes and ears. During the emergency known as the Battle of the St. Lawrence their role was very important and some units undertook combat patrols.

== See also ==
- Article XV squadrons
- British Commonwealth Air Training Plan
- RCAF Eastern Air Command
- List of British Commonwealth Air Training Plan facilities in Canada
