= No. 3 Training Command RCAF =

- Active: 29 April 1940–15 January 1945
- Country: Canada
- Branch: Royal Canadian Air Force
- Role: British Commonwealth Air Training Plan administration
- Garrison/HQ: Montreal

Commanders
- Notable commanders: Clifford McEwen

No. 3 Training Command RCAF was a training command of the Royal Canadian Air Force during World War II established to administer the schools of the British Commonwealth Air Training Plan.

== History ==
No. 3 Training Command was formed as No. 2 Training Group at Montreal on 18 March 1940, but was soon redesignated as No. 3 Training Command on 29 April 1940, responsible for schools in Quebec and The Maritimes. Air Commodore Clifford McEwen was appointed group commander on 19 March and continued in that position for the command until 26 March 1941. Later commanders were Air Commodore George Victor Walsh from 27 March 1941, Air Vice-Marshal Joseph Lionel Elphege Albert de Niverville from 2 November of that year, and Air Vice-Marshal Adelard Raymond from 20 November 1943 to the end of its existence. As the BCATP was wound down it was merged with No. 1 Training Command RCAF to form No. 1 Air Command RCAF on 15 January 1945.

== Schools ==
The command controlled the following schools in January 1944: Location and aircraft operated, if applicable, are in parentheses.

- Initial Training School: No. 1 (Victoriaville)
- Elementary Flying Training Schools: No. 4 (Windsor Mills; Fleet Finch and de Havilland DH.60 Moth), No. 11 (Cap-de-la-Madeleine; Finch and Fairchild Cornell), No. 13 (Saint-Eugène; Finch), No. 17 (Stanley; Finch and Moth), No. 21 (Chatham; Finch), and No. 22 (Quebec City; Finch)
- Service Flying Training Schools:
  - No. 2 Service Flying Training School (Uplands; North American Harvard and North American Yale),
  - No. 8 Service Flying Training School RCAF (Moncton; Avro Anson);
  - No. 13 Service Flying Training School RCAF (Saint-Hubert; Harvard and Anson)
- Air Observer Schools: No. 8 (Quebec City; Anson), No. 9 (St-Jean; Anson), and No. 10 (Chatham; Anson)
- Bombing and Gunnery Schools: No. 9 (Mont-Joli; Anson, Fairey Battle, Bristol Bolingbroke, Northrop A-17, and Westland Lysander), and No. 10 (Mount Pleasant; Anson, Battle, Bolingbroke, and Lysander)
- Wireless School: No. 3 (Montreal; Noorduyn Norseman and Moth)
- Flying Instructor School: No. 3 (Arnprior; various)
- Naval Air Gunners School: No. 1 (Yarmouth; Fairey Swordfish)
- General Reconnaissance Schools:
  - No. 1 General Reconnaissance School RCAF (Summerside; Anson)
  - No. 31 General Reconnaissance School RCAF (Charlottetown; Anson)
