= Mimico =

Mimico Omiimiikaa (Anishinaabemowin)
- Neighbourhood
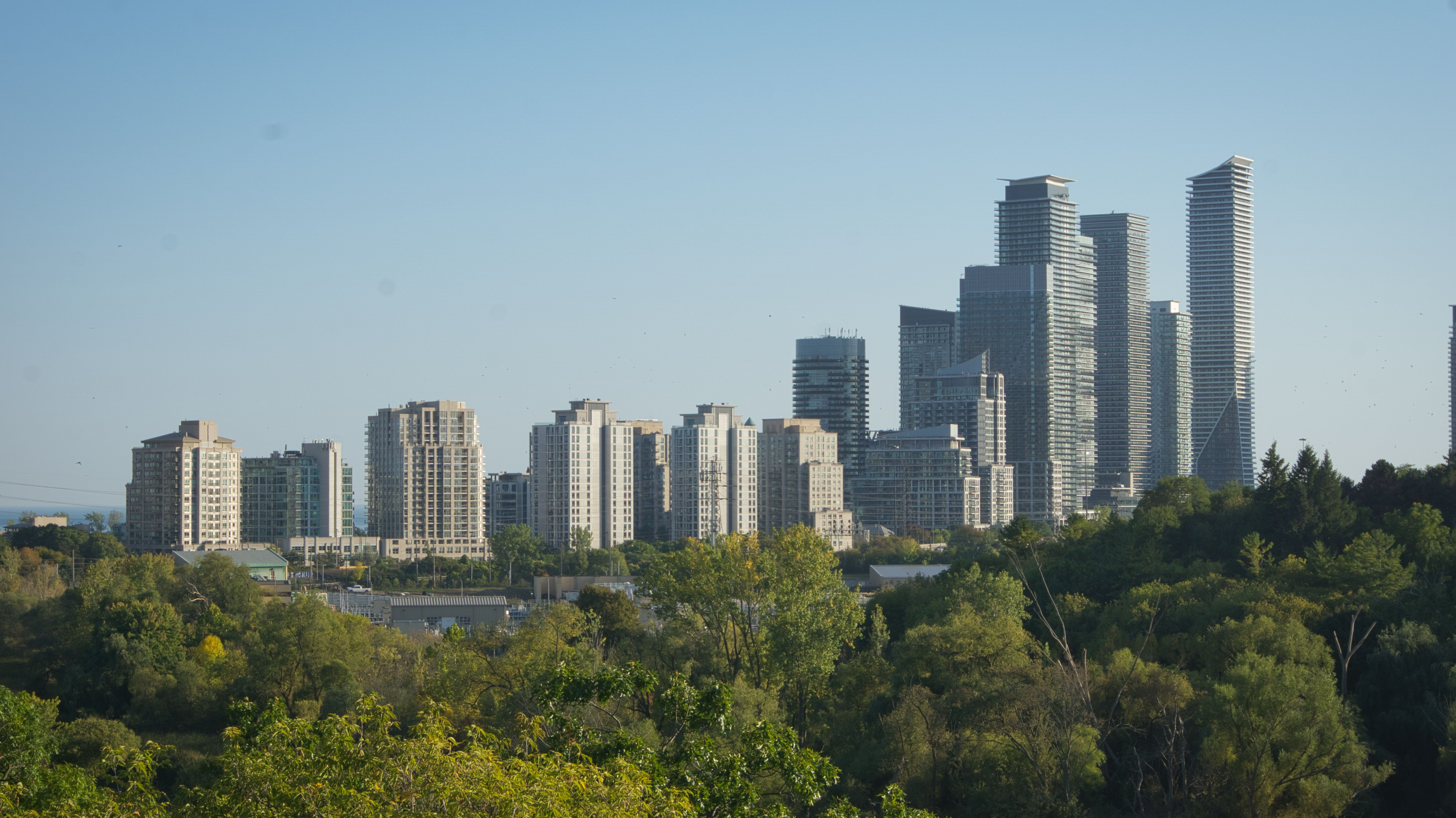
- Skyline of Mimico in 2025

- Location within Toronto
- Coordinates: 43°36′46″N 79°29′39″W
- Country: Canada
- Province: Ontario
- City: Toronto
- Community: Etobicoke
- Established: 1856 (Subdivision); 1858 (Postal village); 1905 (Police village)
- Incorporated: 1911 (Village); 1917 (Town)
- Joined: 1953 (Metropolitan Toronto)

Government
  - MP: James Maloney (Etobicoke—Lakeshore)
  - MPP: Lee Fairclough (Etobicoke—Lakeshore)
  - Councillor: Amber Morley (Ward 3 Etobicoke—Lakeshore)

Population
  - Total: 40,840

Mimico (/ˈmɪmɪkoʊ/, MIH-mih-koh) is a neighbourhood (and a former municipality) in Toronto, Ontario, Canada, being located in the south-west area of Toronto on Lake Ontario. It is in the south-east corner of the former Township (and later, City) of Etobicoke, and was an independent municipality from 1911 to 1967.

Mimico, which was named after the passenger pigeon, is the oldest of the former Lakeshore Municipalities. The Town of Mimico was established by a plan of sub-division in 1856, but was not sub-divided from the former Township of Etobicoke until 1911. The land area of Mimico originated mainly from three family farms, namely: Stock Estate (North of Portland), Hendry Estate (between Royal York and Queens Ave), Van Every Estate (between Royal York Rd and Dwight Ave). Mimico was an independent municipality until 1967, when it was amalgamated into the new Borough of Etobicoke (later, City of, in 1984), which was itself amalgamated in 1998 into the current city of Toronto.

Today, Mimico is primarily a residential area with two commercial strips; one along Royal York Road and the other along Lake Shore Boulevard West, parallel to the shoreline (from Louisa Avenue to Allen Avenue). There is also a former commercial strip along Mimico Avenue connecting Royal York Road and Lake Shore Boulevard West. Some areas of industrial use exist along the railway corridor. In early 2012, Toronto Life magazine ranked Mimico first on their "Where to Buy Now" list of Toronto neighbourhoods.

== Etymology ==
The name 'Mimico' is derived from the Ojibwe word omiimiikaa meaning "abundant with wild pigeons" (cf. 19th century Mississaugas omiimii, "pigeon"). The 'pigeon' after which Mimico was named was the Passenger pigeon. It was thought to have been the most numerous species in the world at the time European colonization began in North America and is now extinct.

== Boundaries ==
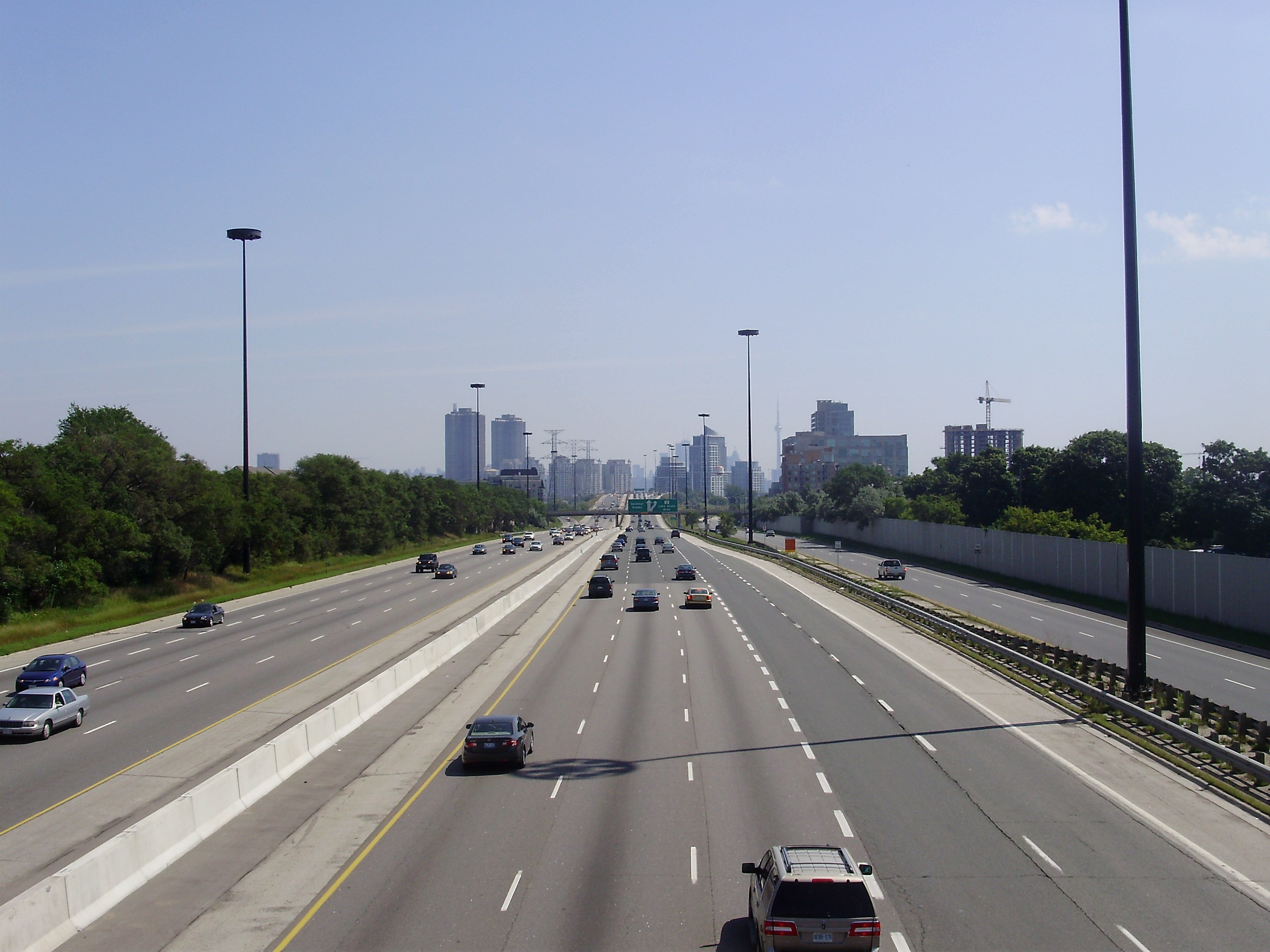
View of the Gardiner Expressway from Royal York Road. The controlled access highway acts as the northern boundary for Mimico.

The former Town of Mimico is bounded by Evans Avenue, Algoma Street and Manitoba Street to the north, Lake Ontario to the south, a line midway between Fleeceline Road and Louisa Street to the East, with the western boundary along a line through Dwight Avenue (south of the railway mainline) and St. George Street (north of the railway mainline). These boundaries for Mimico are defined on City of Toronto zoning maps. See:

1. Town of Mimico, Ward Map (1930)
2. City of Toronto, Urban Development Services West District, map, Etobicoke Zoning Mimico South
3. Toronto, City Planning West District, map, Etobicoke Zoning Mimico North

The Mimico "neighbourhood planning area" starts at the Humber River to the east, its northern boundary being the Gardiner Expressway as far west as the CPR north-south railway line west of Kipling Avenue. The western boundary follows the CPR railway line south to the CNR railway line. The western boundary then continues along the CNR railway line to Dwight Avenue, then south along Dwight Avenue to Lake Ontario. This planning area includes part of the former Township of Etobicoke (including parts of Humber Bay and Alderwood), and are used for planning purposes (which also match the census tracts for that area). This planning area also includes the recent Humber Bay Shores condominium developments along Lakeshore Boulevard West east of Mimico at the former "Motel Strip" area of Humber Bay, as well as the industrial areas along the rail lines to the west and an area to the north, all of which comprised part of the Township of Etobicoke.

These other areas outside Mimico were never part of the Town of Mimico and are not considered part of the Mimico neighbourhood.

== Character ==
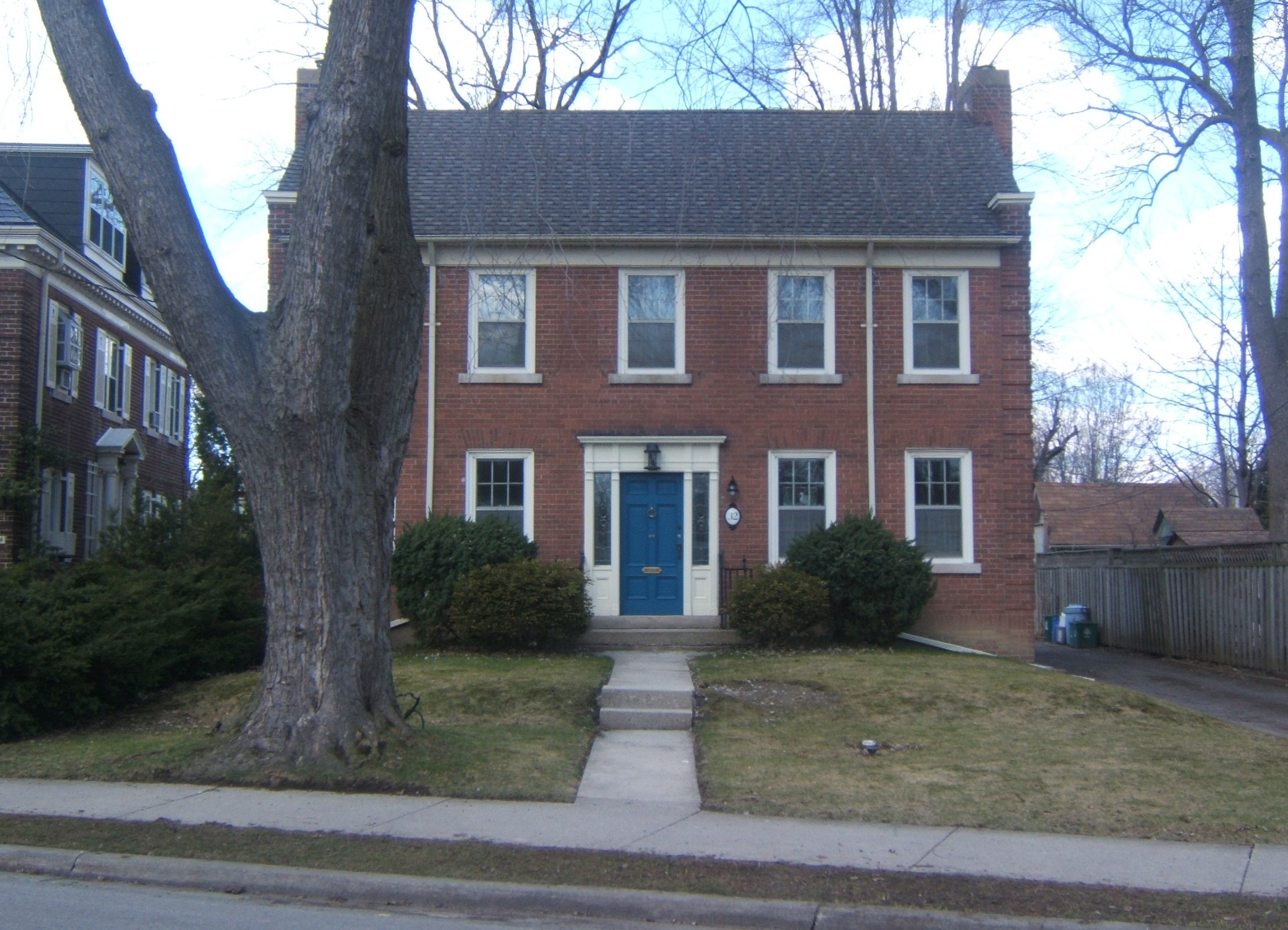
Early residences in Mimico range from lakeside estates to bungalows built in the early 1920s to 1940s.

Historically, The Town of Mimico had few municipal buildings and none of these survive. Architecturally, homes in Mimico range from grand lakeside estates to bungalows built in the 1920s to 1940s, and low rise apartment buildings built in the 1950s and 1960s. East of historic Mimico between Mimico Creek on the west and the Humber River to the east, there is a large area of condominium high-rise tower development at the former "Motel Strip" area of Humber Bay along the lake shore. Lake Shore Blvd. West is also home to many Eastern European delicatessen, independent stores and bakeries, giving the area an Eastern European atmosphere.

Businesses in Mimico's commercial strips along Royal York (north of the railway tracks) and Lake Shore Boulevard West (South of the railway tracks) have organised themselves into two Business Improvement Areas: 'Mimico Village' (along Royal York Rd. in northern Mimico) and 'Mimico by the Lake' (the heart of the former 'Mimico Beach' postal area along the lakeshore in eastern Mimico).

=== Landmarks ===
- Mimico Post Office (Now in a Pharmacy) Original site is now St. Leo's Church, the Postmaster's home (Werden House) is now St. Leo's Rectory
- Mimico Centennial Library Site of former Mimico Carnegie Library.
- Mimico GO Station
- Connaught Masonic Hall, Mimico
- Mimico Legion Hall (Closed) Joined with New Toronto Legion Hall
- Hogle Funeral Home (former Methodist Manse)

Although several institutions in Etobicoke derive their namesake from Mimico, such as the Mimico Correctional Centre (former Victoria Industrial School), and the former Mimico Lunatic Asylum are not actually located in the neighbourhood, but are a bit further west, in the neighbourhood of New Toronto.

==== Churches ====
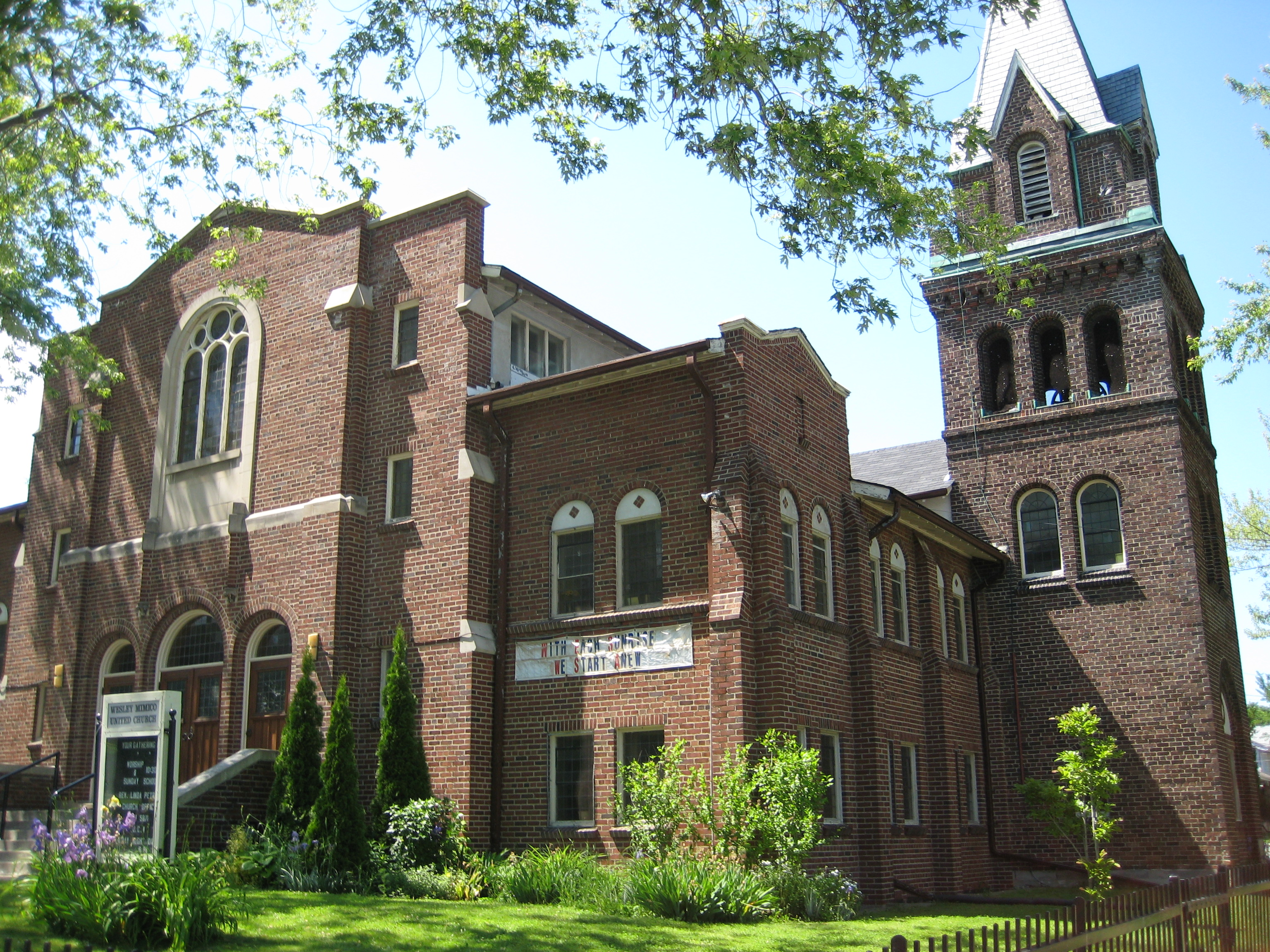
Wesley Mimico United Church is one of several churches situated in the neighbourhood.

- Christ Church Anglican (Burnt down) First Church in Etobicoke
- Wesley Mimico United Church 1927 Union of Wesley Methodist Church (1863) and St. Paul's Presbyterian Church
- Mimico Presbyterian Church Built 1891, a new church building built beside the old in 1958
- Mimico Baptist Church Built 1922
- St. Leo's Roman Catholic Church First Catholic Parish in Etobicoke, Also former home of the Lakeshore Beavers, Cubs and Scouts
- Martin Luther Evangelical Lutheran Church
- Mimico Gospel Hall
- Mimico United Pentecostal

== History ==
After arriving in the Toronto area, Elizabeth Simcoe, wife of Upper Canada's first Governor and the founder of Toronto, refers to the large number of (passenger) pigeons after which Mimico is named. The area known as "Mimico" was originally located up the Mimico Creek at Dundas Street, where Upper Canada's early highway connecting Toronto to the west and the community of Mimico were located.

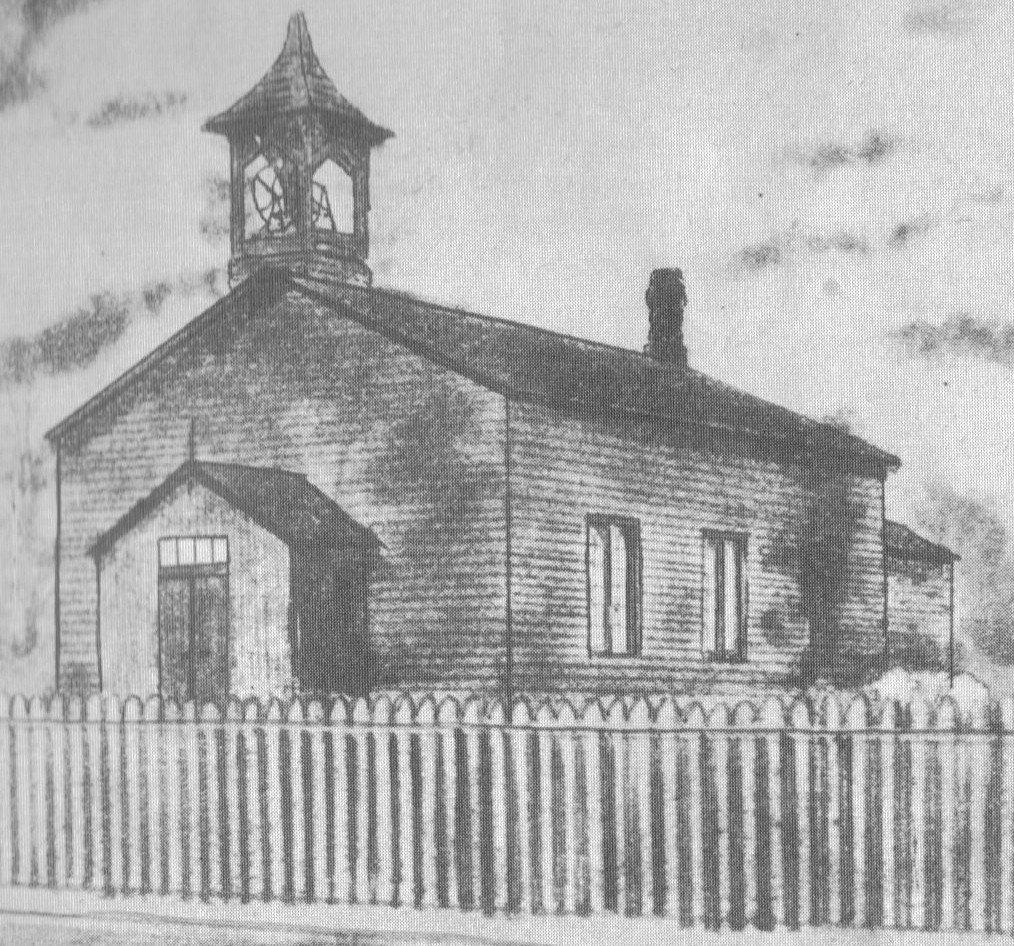
Christ Church was opened in Mimico in 1827.

One of Etobicoke's most prominent businessmen, William Gamble, opened a sawmill on the west bank of Mimico Creek up from the lake, and a small settlement for the mill workers was built nearby. With Mr Gamble's patronage Etobicoke's first church, Christ Church (Anglican), was opened on Church Street (Royal York Road). At this time, Mimico was in Etobicoke Township, which had been meeting with the other townships in the southern part of the County of York (what would become Metropolitan Toronto) as the Township of York (excluding the Town of York, later City of Toronto). Mr. Gamble eventually moved his business away, but with the addition of a school at the foot of Church St (Royal York Rd), Mimico would not disappear.

=== Early development (1850–1905) ===
By 1850, after the Union of The Canadas, Etobicoke was formally recognised as a Township. The Great Western Railway (originally chartered as the Toronto & Hamilton Railway) was built through the southern part of the Township. The first Mimico railway station opened in 1855, just north of the tracks beside Christ Church on Church St. (now Royal York Rd.). A plan of subdivision was commissioned with side-streets for the 'Town of Mimico'. Mimico was advertised as being '8 minutes' from Toronto (by train), then bordered by Dufferin St. In 1858, a Mimico post office had been opened just south of the Railway Station on Church St. (Royal York Rd.) where St. Leo's Church is today and in 1863, the Wesley Methodist Church was established.

This prompted the original Mimico area on Dundas St. to adopt a new name; Islington. In Tremaine's 1860 Map of York County, the Mimico subdivision is reprinted with all its side streets, however by 1861, the plan had already failed, the area largely returning to agricultural use. Mimico's founding families were therefore mostly farmers: the Van Everys (Loyalists), the Hendrys and the Stocks.

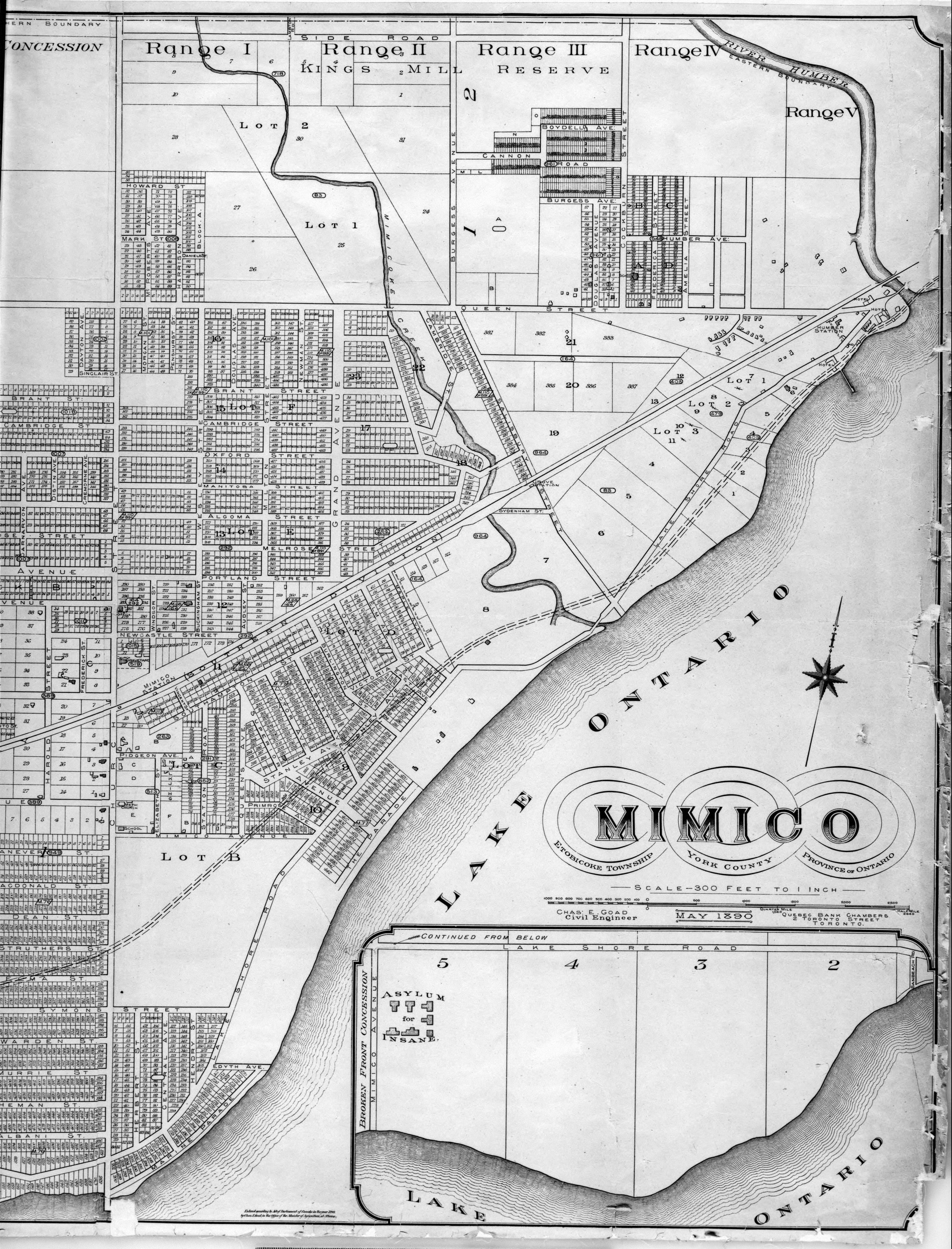
Map of Mimico c. 1890. In 1890 the Mimico Real Estate Security Company Ltd was formed to divide and sell lots in Mimico.

Between 1883 and 1893, there were 13 separate annexations to the City of Toronto which brought the border of that city to the Humber River. In 1890, the Mimico Real Estate Security Company Ltd was formed to divide and sell lots in Mimico. This plan included the subdivision of Mr. Edward Stock's land as far north as the Stock's Side Road (an extension of Toronto's Queen Street, now the Queensway) and a cattle path he had established as a shortcut from Church St. (Royal York Rd.) to Lake Shore Road became Mimico Avenue.

Around that time, the Mimico area was incorrectly shown on some fire insurance plans as extending North of Lake Ontario, West of the Humber River, South of North Queen Street (Delroy Drive) and East of Mimico Avenue (now Kipling Avenue), as the community of Mimico was located in the immediate vicinity of the railway station and post office. A year later a Presbyterian Church was built on Mimico Avenue. Mimico was expected to grow quickly. A second post office was opened in the Town of New Toronto (established in 1890). A small number of Victorian buildings were built on the newly laid out streets assuring that this time they would not simply disappear. Mimico and the other lakeshore communities west of the Humber River were eventually linked by an independent radial railway line run by the Toronto and Mimico Electric Railway and Light Company, which originated in the Sunnyside area. This line was originally intended to link with a line started from Hamilton. However, the western end of the T&M was never completed past Port Credit.

The radial railway line brought many of Toronto's wealthy to Mimico's waterfront area, where several large estates were built. First and most impressive of which was the Featherstonaugh Estate which was shaped like a castle at the bottom of Royal York Rd. This period in which Mimico took shape was also the period in which Mimico's namesake, the passenger pigeon, disappeared from the area, the last known bird dying near the beginning of the next century in the United States. A Mimico resident, Mr. John Kay on noticing the disappearance of this species donated a stuffed passenger pigeon to the Royal Ontario Museum in Toronto to preserve some of the last evidence of what had been Mimico's namesake.

=== Incorporation (1905–1967) ===
Federal census population history of Mimico
| Year | Pop. | ±% |
|---|---|---|
| 1911 | 1,373 | — |
| 1921 | 3,751 | +173.2% |
| 1931 | 6,800 | +81.3% |
| 1941 | 8,070 | +18.7% |
| 1951 | 11,342 | +40.5% |
| 1956 | 13,687 | +20.7% |
| 1961 | 18,212 | +33.1% |
| 1966 | 19,431 | +6.7% |
Source: Statistics Canada

Mimico became a police village in 1905 and the next year the Grand Trunk Railway's Mimico railway yards were opened. Mimico became a village in 1911 electing its first Village Reeve, Robert Skelton. The same year, a second post office named 'Mimico Beach' was established to serve the southern half of Mimico, located on Lake Shore Road. Mimico became the smallest community to obtain a Carnegie Library in which the town council met at first. The first immigrants began to arrive in Mimico and at this time Etobicoke's first Catholic Church was built in Mimico, St. Leo's.

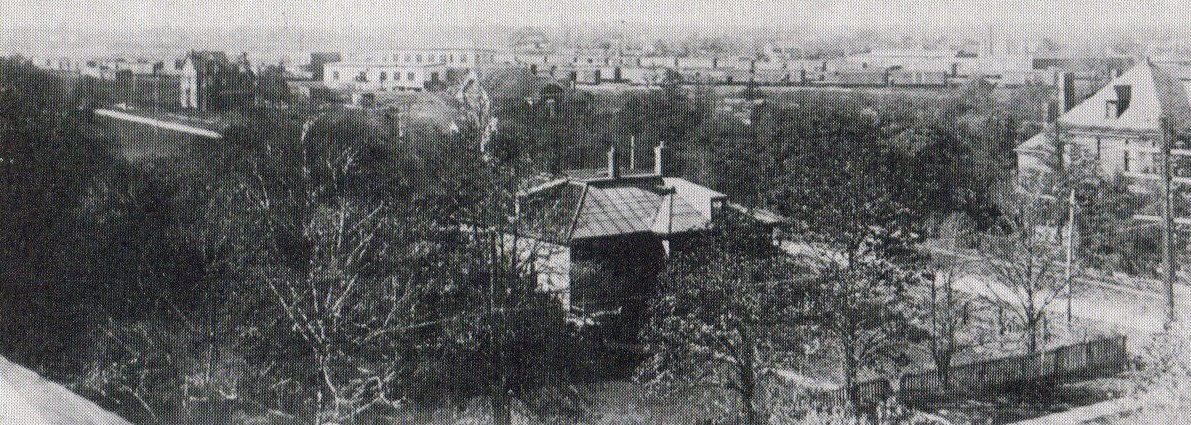
View of the Mimico Train Yards along Drummond Street and Royal York Road, c. 1906. The railway was the largest employer in Mimico at the beginning of the 20th century.

Mimico's largest employer was traditionally the railway (with its yards mostly located in New Toronto), but because New Toronto was planned as an industrial town, many larger industries located there. Nevertheless, a new train station was needed and was built on the south side of the tracks near the north end of Station Road. In 1909, a hotel was established beside the railway called the Windsor Hotel (today the Blue Goose Tavern). Although other 1890s subdivisions in Toronto at Roncesvalles and the Beaches were entirely built up in the pre-war years, Mimico's growth was slow with no street being fully built and some still without any residences built on them. Nevertheless, many foursquare houses were built mostly in south-central Mimico in this period. In 1916, a referendum was held on the question of New Toronto joining Mimico, this was accepted by Mimico voters but rejected in New Toronto. Mimico incorporated as a fully independent town in 1917.

During the First World War, in 1917, Mimico became fully independent and elected its first Mayor, John Harrison, by acclamation. The town also reacted to the sensational execution of British Nurse Edith Cavell by naming Mimico's old Southampton Street in her memory in 1916. Another street was also given this name in Toronto's East End leading to recent attempts by Toronto to rename Mimico's Cavell Ave. At the end of the war, the local chapter of the Imperial Order of the Daughters of the Empire, who met at the Carnegie Library, presented the town with two plaques honouring all those from the town who had enlisted and another honouring those who had died.

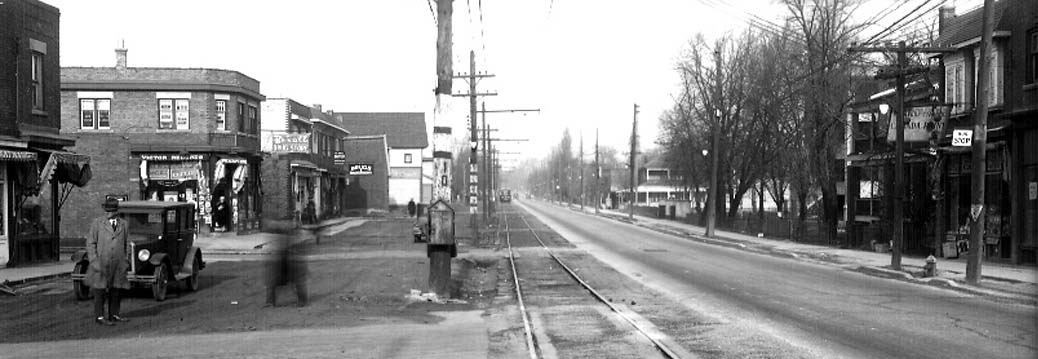
Streetcar tracks along Lake Shore Boulevard, 1927. In 1928, the local streetcar line was merged with the Toronto streetcar system.

With the union of the Methodist, Congregational and many Presbyterian churches, the old Wesley Methodist Church on Church St (Royal York Rd) became vacant as a new United Church was built on Mimico Ave. The Town of Mimico purchased the old Methodist Church which served as the Town Hall. In 1922, Mimico's Baptist Church was built. Many bungalow style 1 1/2-storey homes were built in the interwar years, especially south of Mimico Avenue, and most notably, the tree-lined 'crescent' streets (Lake Cres, Eastbourne Cres, Dartmouth Cres and Lake Shore) were developed with large cottage–style homes. In 1928 the local streetcar line merged with the Toronto Transit Commission (TTC) which at first combined the line with Toronto's 'Queen' line.

Doubts about Mimico's survival appeared during the Great Depression when the Town went deeply into debt and many businesses disappeared. The depression also bankrupted some of Toronto's wealthiest including Sir Henry Pellatt (builder of Casa Loma) who had already built a house in Mimico (Bailey House) which stood at the bend in Lake Shore near Fleeceline overlooking the commercial stretch on Lake Shore. Smaller industries moved into areas around the railway tracks.

Just before the outbreak of World War II, Canada's first 'Limited Access' Highway, the Queen Elizabeth Way, was opened by Queen Elizabeth just north of the Town of Mimico's northern boundary.

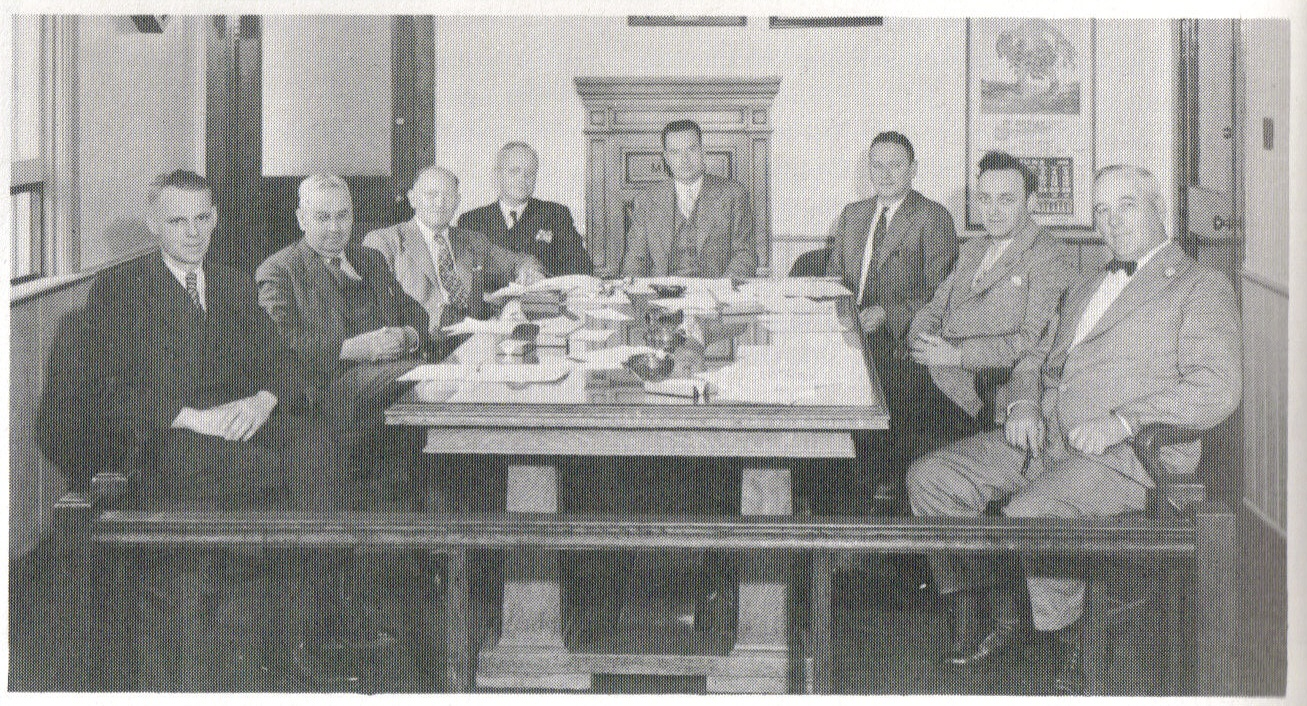
Amos Waites (centre) with other councillors of the Mimico Town Council, 1943. Waites was the longest-serving mayor for Mimico.

Mimico's longest-serving mayor (at different periods from 1936 to 1948) was Amos Waites, who alternated in this post with Mayor Archibald Norris. About the time of the Second World War many 1-storey houses were built, filling in most of the gaps in the housing especially in northern and western Mimico. Many new immigrants came to Mimico in the 1950s. In 1953, Mimico became one of thirteen cities and towns which formed the new Metropolitan Toronto. The next year Hurricane Hazel struck and while communities around Mimico were some of the worst affected, the storm left Mimico largely untouched. The Town of Mimico saw its future in attracting many more small families and working people to the area and began to tear down older homes that stood on large lots and filled in these and the last remaining empty lots with apartment buildings.

Smaller 3-storey apartment buildings went up on almost every street while larger apartments appeared along much of the Lake Shore on the east side. More commercial space was also built especially on the northern side of Lake Shore Road from Mimico Ave. to Burlington St. A period of church expansion occurred with Christ Church Anglican and St. Leo's Roman Catholic Church building new Churches at this time for larger congregations. St. Leo's new church was built on the site of Mimico's 1858 Post Office which was demolished and shortly after the postmaster's home (Werden House) was purchased to become the new rectory. In 1958, the Presbyterian Church built a new church building beside the old church. A legion hall was established in Mimico in Sir Henry Pellatt's former Bailey House.

=== Merger with Etobicoke (1967–1998) ===
In 1967, the Town of Mimico was merged with two other lake shore communities (the Town of New Toronto and the Village of Long Branch) and the Township of Etobicoke to form the Borough of Etobicoke. The Last Mayor of Mimico, who was first elected in 1960, was Hugh Griggs who edited Mimico's official history 'The Mimico Story'. While Canada celebrated its Centenary, the new Mimico Centennial Library was opened. Mimico had torn down the Carnegie Library (the only of Toronto's Carnegie Libraries to be demolished) and two adjacent houses to build the larger Mimico Centennial Library, which was set back from the corner location of the previous library building. The plaque honouring the towns First World War veterans was removed to a new park named 'Vimy Memorial' at Lake Shore Blvd. West and Queens Ave. The legion hall that had been in Sir Henry Pellatt's Bailey house was moved to Eden Court, the former farm residence of the Stock family, when Bailey house was demolished for a street to serve new industries east of Mimico. Bailey House's time as the Legion hall is commemorated in the name of the street it was demolished for: Legion Road.

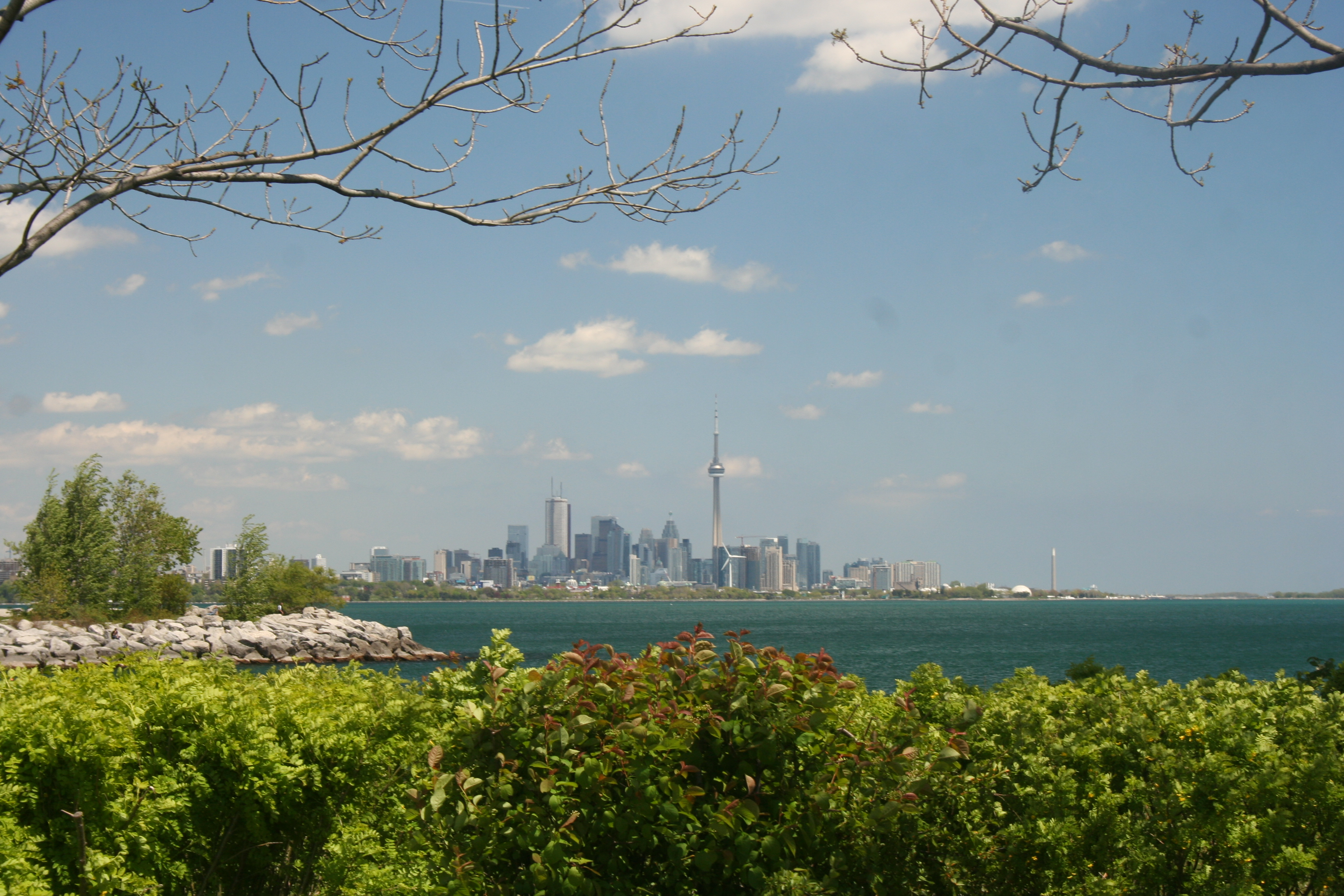
View of Downtown Toronto from Humber Bay Park West, a municipal park established in 1984.

Mimico began slowly to decline as the children of families who lived in the small houses of the 1940s moved to the growing outer suburbs and the apartments did not live up to the hopes they had generated as they quickly deteriorated. Businesses also continued to fail and many of the small industries moved out. In 1984, Etobicoke became a city and a plan was prepared to rejuvenate Mimico which called for limiting the amount of commercial space by rezoning Mimico Avenue as non-commercial. The same year, Humber Bay Park was opened, consisting of two artificial peninsulas on either side of the mouth of Mimico Creek, with one on the east side and one on the west side (enclosing Mimico's beach to create a harbour) which connect to the main land at the end of Mimico Creek. The creation of the artificial park led to unintended consequences with some of the sandy shoreline in Mimico eroding away.

With declining enrollment at Mimico High School, the building was offered to the Catholic board as the number of Catholics had been increasing with many Italian and Polish immigrants arriving in Mimico. This offer was refused and an Adult Learning Centre was opened there instead. The Centre has since swapped buildings with John English Elementary School. An estate on Lake Shore Boulevard was bought by the Polish government at this time to become their Toronto Consulate. A new railway station was built in the 1970s to service GO trains on the site of the 1855 station on the north side of the tracks just south of Christ Church on Royal York while the old 1916 station fell into disrepair.

=== Post-amalgamation (1998–present) ===
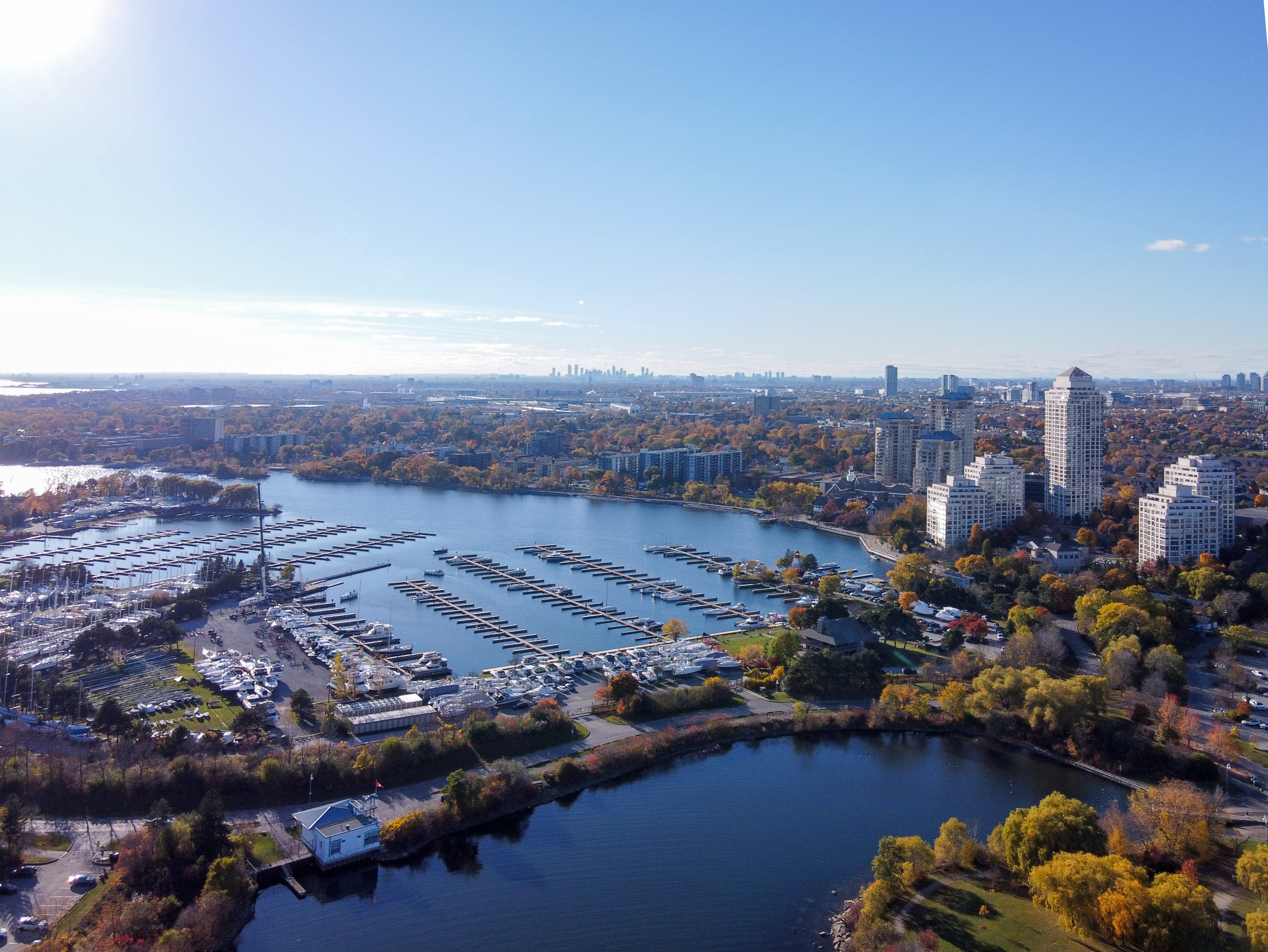
Developments in the early 21st century have transformed the strip along Lake Shore Boulevard into a condominium high rises.

In 1998, Etobicoke was amalgamated with Metro Toronto and its five other municipalities into the new City of Toronto. Much of the former industrial land was subdivided for 'Monster Homes' in the 1980s and later for townhouses, a process that continues today. Old plans for rejuvenating Mimico and its waterfront are also slowly being realized. The strip along Lake Shore Boulevard east of Park Lawn, formerly a strip of motels, became an area of numerous condominium apartment buildings. Condominium apartment buildings are also being built within the historic area of Mimico.

Mimico's oldest church, Christ Church Anglican experienced two fires within a short period of time and the remains were demolished leaving the old cemetery and a new park where the church once stood. The possibility of Mimico 'gentrifying' is sometimes mentioned in plans for Mimico but this has only taken place on a very small scale. Greater attempts at preserving Mimico's history are also being made with the historical designation of Eden Court (former home of Edward Stock) and the preservation and ongoing restoration of Mimico's old railway station.

Efforts have also been made recently to prevent the demolition of the Town of Mimico's last municipal building (Firehall at #13 Superior Ave. - now demolished for a condominium) and the Franceshini/Ormsby Estate (Amedeo Garden Court property).

== Education ==
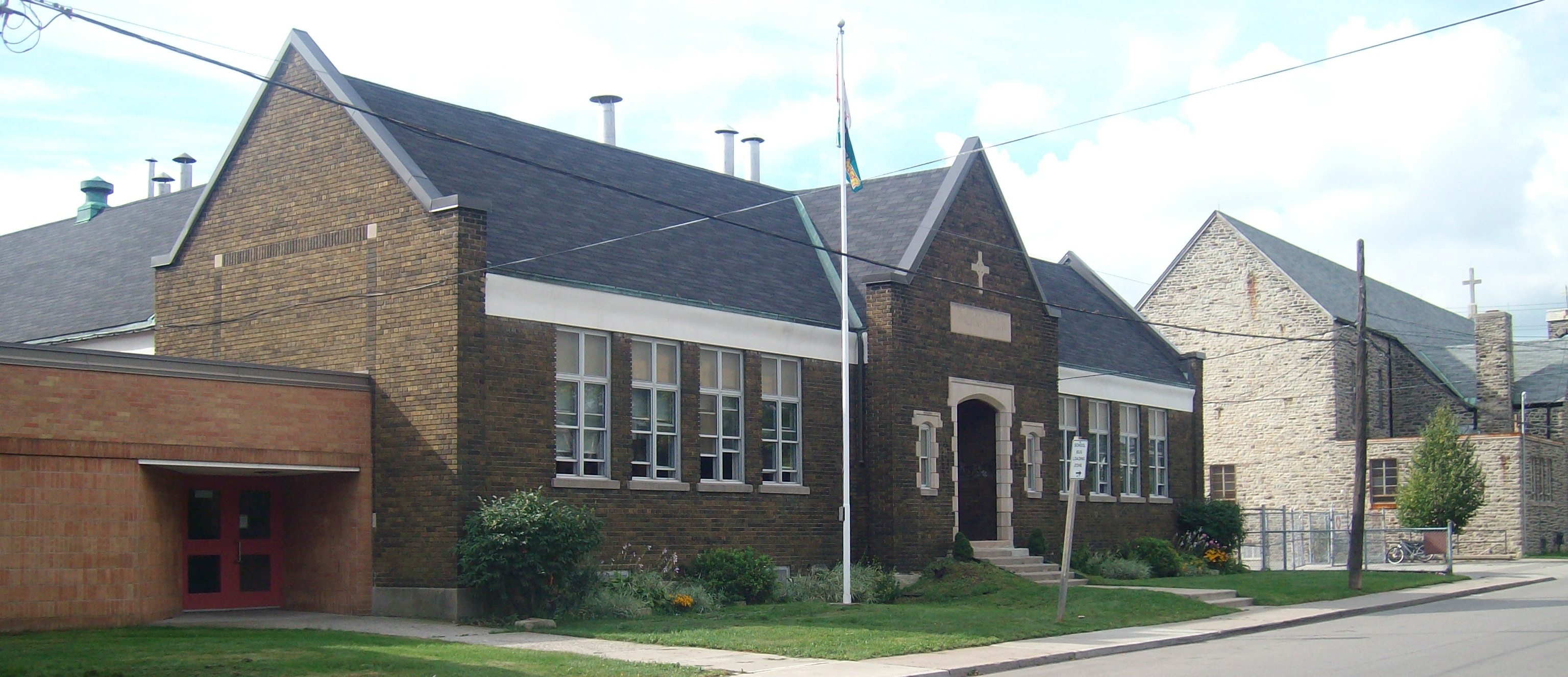
St. Leo's Catholic Elementary School is one of several public elementary schools located in the neighbourhood.

Two public school boards operate elementary schools in the neighbourhood, the secular Toronto District School Board (TDSB), and the separate Toronto Catholic District School Board. In addition to elementary schools, TDSB also operates the Mimico Adult Learning Centre, situated on Royal York Road.

TDSB operates two elementary schools in the area. George R. Gauld Junior School is a located on Melrose Street, occupying the building formerly used by Mimico High School (a TDSB secondary school closed in 1988). With increased immigration of working families to the Town of Mimico's northern half, it was felt that a new elementary school was needed to compliment John English Junior Middle School. In 1923, George R. Gauld Public School was opened, named after a former trustee and superintendent of the nearby Victoria Industrial School (later moved to Guelph, the remains of the older institution becoming the Mimico Correctional Centre). The school has had two additions, one in 1932 and another in 1959.

David Hornell Junior School is a TDSB elementary school built in 1961, and is located on Victoria Street. The street is named after Mimico resident and World War II Victoria Cross recipient, Flight Lieutenant David Ernest Hornell. Hornell was awarded the Victoria Cross posthumously for service during the Second World War serving in RCAF No. 162 Squadron. On June 24, 1944, Lieutenant Hornell's Consolidated Canso was damaged by gunfire while attacking (and successfully sinking) U-1225 off the Faroe Islands. Hornell successfully landed the crippled and burning flying boat in heavy seas, but died of exposure. An outdoor plaque and a display of memorabilia in the front hall are dedicated to Hornell and the school honours his memory annually on Remembrance Day. The school serves a diverse population of students. For many of them, David Hornell School is their first link with Canadian culture. A large number of the students speak another language at home while they acquire English skills at school.

TCDSB operates two public elementary schools in the area, St. Leo Catholic Elementary School on Stanley Avenue, and St. Louis Catholic Elementary School on Morgan Avenue.

St. Leo Catholic School is a Toronto Catholic District School Board elementary school opened in 1926 on Pidgeon (now Stanley) Avenue, in the parish of St. Leo's (the oldest Catholic Church in Etobicoke), with the school being the oldest existing Catholic School in Etobicoke; the older Highfield Catholic School on Etobicoke's border with Brampton having closed many years before St. Leo opened. For lack of funds, the original school building (still standing) was a copy of the older St. Patrick's Catholic Elementary School (demolished for Malton, now Pearson, airport) in what is now Brampton; technically, St. Patrick's was the 'mother' parish of St. Leo's although early Catholics in Mimico preferred to attend church and school in Toronto or the local Etobicoke public school (now renamed the John English Junior Middle School). With the establishment of St. Leo elementary school, a Mimico Catholic School Board was also established for the one catholic school in Mimico. Originally, St. Leo was served by the Sisters of St. Joseph who commuted, first from Toronto, later from their Etobicoke residence in Our Lady of Sorrows Parish (beside the early St. Joseph's Catholic Secondary School for Girls, Islington). The school grew in the interwar years despite the creation of new 'daughter' parishes and schools in New Toronto (St. Teresa's), Humber (St Mark's) and later, the Queensway (Holy Angels). The school sits on land donated by parishioners of St. Leo's parish who used the school for many events until the building of a parish hall in the 1960s, and was operated by taxes raised from Mimico Catholics by the Mimico School Board until it joined the Metropolitan Catholic School Board (now the Toronto Catholic District School Board) in 1967 when the Town of Mimico ceased to exist and the Sisters of St. Joseph were replaced by lay staff. One of the most celebrated former alumni of the school, hockey player and executive Brendan Shanahan, has maintained a connection with his home town and school. The school has celebrated its 50th and 75th anniversaries while the local parish is celebrating its 100th.

== Recreation ==
Recreational facilities in Mimico include the Mimico Tennis Club, the Mimico Cruising Club, the Etobicoke Yacht Club, and the Humber Bay Sailing Centre, Mimico Waterfront Park, and Coronation Park.

Near the foot of Park Lawn Road is Humber Bay Park, land created by infill of the lake, creating an artificial peninsula and enclosing Mimico Harbour at Mimico Creek. It has a few picnic areas, boat slips, walking trails and grasslands for recreational use.

In 1890, a waterfront walkway was planned consisting of The Parade at the bottom of Superior Avenue and Marine Parade starting at the bottom of Royal York Road. This plan had disappeared by 1911 except for a small part of Marine Parade (Sussex Drive). The City of Toronto, along with the Toronto and Region Conservation Authority, is building a publicly accessible waterfront. The first phase of the Mimico Linear Park, opened in July 2008, connects three small parks using cobblestone beaches, boardwalks and sand dunes, and will eventually connect with Humber Bay Park to the east. As of 2008, construction of the second phase was delayed due to a minority group of property owners who refused to sell their lakefront access. This project has been completed through the Humber Bay neighbourhood with a roadway named Marine Parade Drive after the original one in Mimico.

Mimico has had a long reputation for supporting both of Canada's national sports. In hockey, Mimico has developed a number of NHL players; there was even a Wayne and Shuster sketch where Johnny and Frank played for the mythical Mimico Mice against the then-Stanley Cup champion Toronto Maple Leafs.

Mimico Lacrosse has been in existence since 1890 and have won a number of National Championships. Lacrosse was originally played in an outdoor box at the corner of Church Street (Royal York) and Drummond Street, where the game has been played continuously until today. It was known across the country as the "Drummond Street Bowl" which included a dirt floor, and old railway boxcars for dressing rooms. The Mimico Mountaineers brought recognition to the town more than any other sports team with Mann Cup wins in 1932 and 1942. Minto Cup victories were recorded in 1938 and 1951.

== Transportation ==
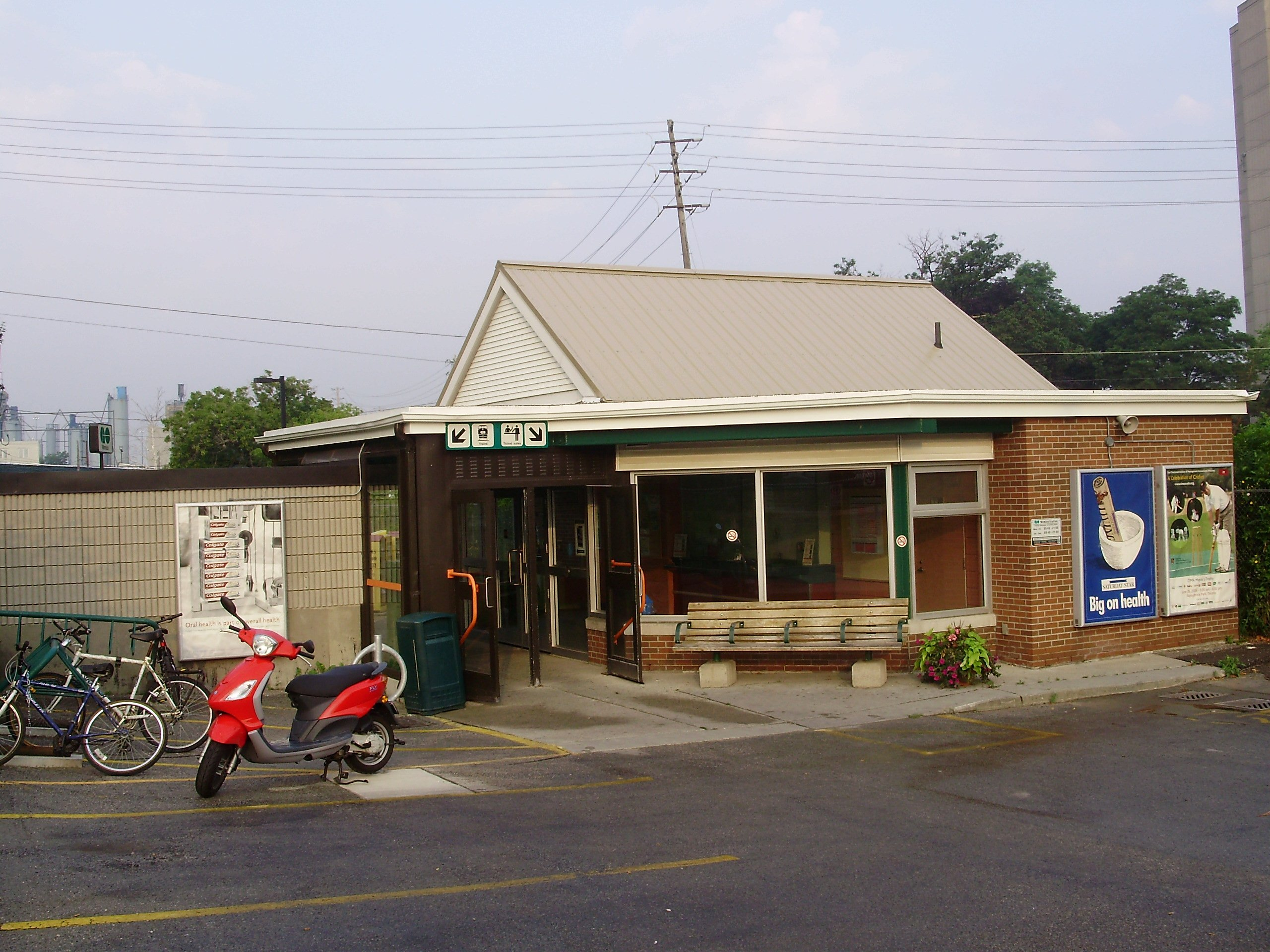
Mimico GO Station is a commuter rail station located in Mimico.

The area is served primarily with buses along Royal York Road and Evans Avenue connecting with the Bloor-Danforth subway and with streetcars along Lake Shore Boulevard. The City of Toronto is in the process of studying various proposals to increase transit connections in the area to downtown. The Mimico GO Transit station provides regular east-west commuter rail travel to downtown Toronto and to as far west as Hamilton. Along the north of the area is the Gardiner Expressway, a large twelve-lane highway (originally built as the Queen Elizabeth Way).

Before the building of the Bloor-Danforth Subway, the TTC operated a 'Mimico' bus route along a portion of Royal York and the Queensway from Humber Loop to the foot of Royal York. A second route was the 507 Long Branch streetcar, which was joined in 1995 to the 501 Queen route (the longest streetcar route in the world), and therefore no longer turns at the Humber Loop. Because of poor service on the western section of the route, the TTC is considering reinstating the separate Long Branch route.

=== Main streets ===
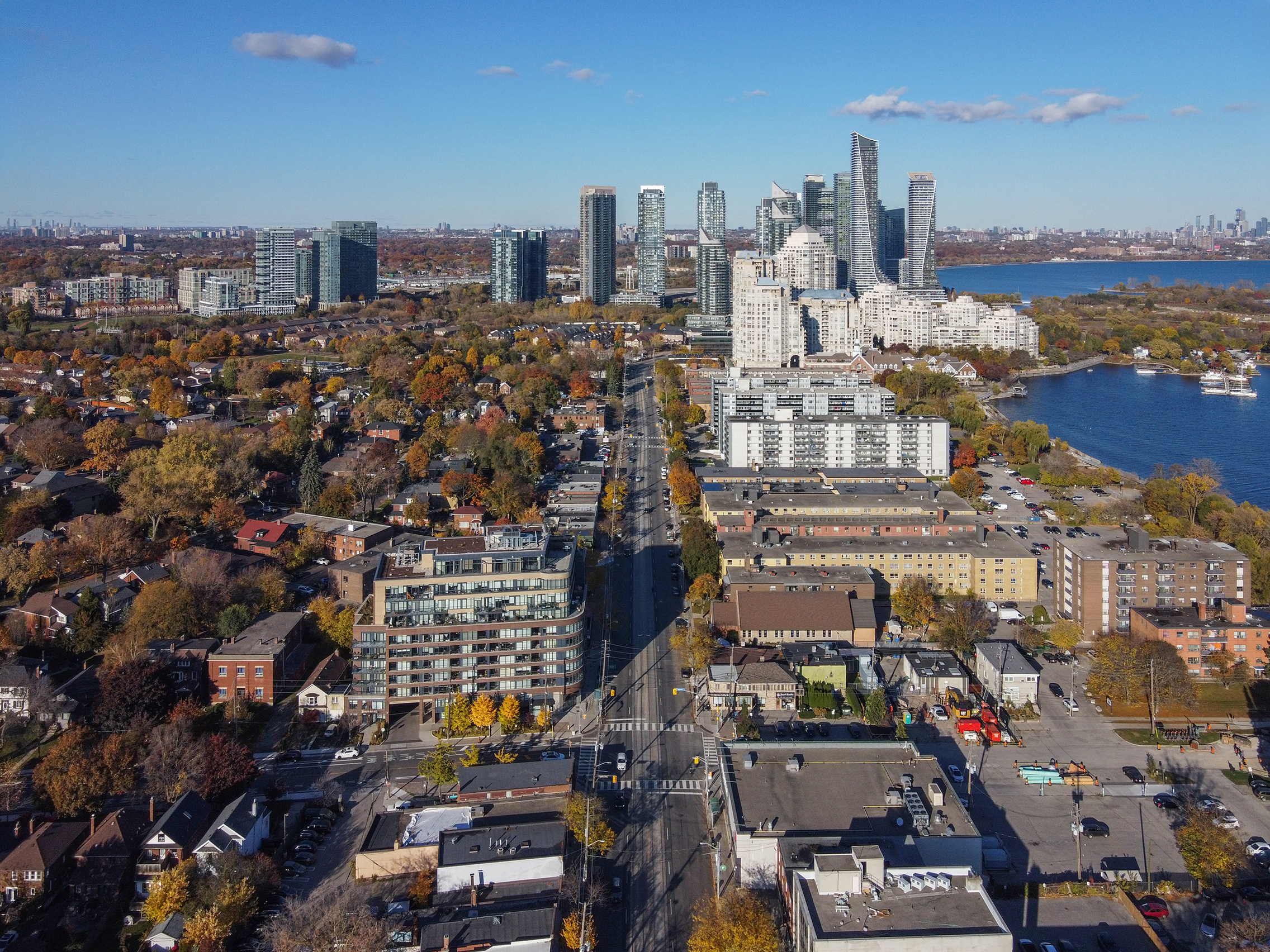
Lake Shore Blvd West in Mimico

Lake Shore Boulevard is a four-lane arterial that runs parallel to the Lake Ontario waterfront from east to west, and is primarily residential within the Mimico area. The major north-south route is Royal York Road.

The original naming convention for Mimico side-streets was for English community names: Buckingham, Windsor (now Blue Goose Street), Newcastle, Portland, Burlington, Manchester, Oxford, Dorchester (now in The Queensway), Southampton (Cavell), Salisbury Ave. (Park Lawn Rd.), Torrington (Grand Ave.), Cambridge (to the North became Mendota), Coventry (to the East became Queens Ave.).

Some later streets were named for Mimico settlers: O'Donnell, Van Every, Robert Hendry (Wheatfield), George (Hendry), Pidgeon (western part of Stanley), Howland (Ourland), Stock's Side Road (Queen St., later The Queensway); and more recently for former mayors of Mimico: Skelton, Norris. The Griggs and Edwards retirement homes are also named for former mayors.

== Mayors of Mimico ==
Reeves and mayors of Mimico

- 1911-1914 Robert Skelton (Reeve)
- 1915 Caesar Coxhead (Reeve)
- 1914, 1916-1918 John Harrison (Mayor from 1917)
- 1919-1920 Louis West
- 1921-1925 John Doughty
- 1926 William Savage
- 1927-1929, 1955-1960 Gus Edwards - A railway engineer, Edwards was nicknamed "Metropolitan Gus" for his long-time advocacy for uniting the city of Toronto with its suburbs in a federation. Edwards first advocated a metropolitan form of government in 1926. He opposed the construction of the Bloor-Danforth subway line and the Toronto Transit Commission's system of fare zones which charged suburban riders double fares.
- 1930–1932 Robert Waites - a builder, he was the uncle of later mayor Amos Waites Waites often quarreled with other town officials, including the reeve and town clerk. In one instance Waites ordered the town's chief constable to remove the reeve and deputy reeve from a council meeting, and in another incident his rival, Archibald Norris, accusing Waites of acting like a "little local Mussolini". Waites was ruled to be in contravention of the Municipal Act for his company accepting payment from the town's sewage commission for construction and maintenance work, but was not removed from office.
- 1933–1935, 1941–1942, 1946, 1949–1954 Archibald Norris - Elected or acclaimed to 12 terms, Norris was Mimico's longest serving mayor. He immigrated to Canada from Deal, England in 1912. Operated a grocery store for 12 years before entering the insurance business. First elected to town council in 1916.
- 1936–1940, 1943–1945, 1947–1948 Amos Waites - He was the nephew of former mayor Robert Waites. During the Great Depression when relief was only paid to men who agreed to labour on public works projects, Waites announced "No work, no relief!" and cut pay to strikers. His house was picketed by protesters bearing signs that said "We can't live on five cents a meal. Waites grew up on a market garden and got his first job at the age of 11 as the caretaker of a one-room schoolhouse for $2 a month. He served on town council for 30 years. Waites's council passed a by-law in 1947 asking the Ontario Municipal Board to create Metropolitan Toronto, consolidating municipal services in the area.
- 1961–1966 Hugh McGregor Griggs - reporter for the Toronto Telegram and one time editor of its educational magazine. Served on Mimico township council for 20 years. Served as a school trustee on the Etobicoke Board of Education following amalgamation. Unsuccessful candidate for the Etobicoke Board of Control in 1972.

== Notable people ==
Politicians

- Patrick Boyer, M.P.
- Hon Forbes Godfrey, Provincial Minister of Health.
- Morley Kells, M.P.P.
- Ken Robinson, M.P.

Athletes

- Dave Bolland, NHL ice hockey player.
- David Clarkson, NHL ice hockey player.
- Jerome Drayton, Canada's top male marathon runner of all-time (1999) and Canada's top male distance runner of all-time (2005).
- John Fedosoff, former CFL player.
- Ed Harrison, NHL ice hockey player.
- Jeff Johnson (Canadian football) CFL Running Back.
- Brendan Shanahan, NHL ice hockey player
- Brendan Smith, NHL ice hockey player.
- Reilly Smith, NHL ice hockey player.
- Rory Smith, National Lacrosse League player and 2x Mann Cup Champion.
- Al Smith, NHL ice hockey player.
- Joey Votto, Major League Baseball player

Other

- Karim Rashid, Canadian-American Industrial Designer
- Sir Ernest MacMillan, orchestral conductor and composer, recipient of the Order of Canada.
- Sir Henry Pellatt, businessman. Died in Mimico.
- David Ernest Hornell, V.C., Second World War Pilot (killed)
- Theodore Loblaw, founder of Loblaws
- Les Stroud, Musician, survival enthusiast and filmmaker, host of Discovery Channel's Survivorman
- Wayne & Shuster, 1950s-1980s Canadian standup comedy team who appeared frequently on The Ed Sullivan Show, performed a routine about a fictional hockey team they called the Mimico Mice.

== See also ==
- List of neighbourhoods in Toronto
- Mimico Creek

== Bibliography ==
- Currell, Harvey (1967). "The Mimico Story", Corporation of the Town of Mimico, Mimico, Toronto, Ontario, Canada.
- Given, Robert (2007). "Etobicoke Remembered", Pro Familia Publishing, Toronto, Ontario, Canada. ISBN 978-1-896596-14-3
- Hayes, Derek (2008). "Historical Atlas of Toronto", Douglas & McIntyre Limited, Vancouver, British Columbia, Canada. ISBN 978-1-55365-290-8
