= Mimico Centennial Library =

Coordinates: 43°36′54″N 79°29′38″W

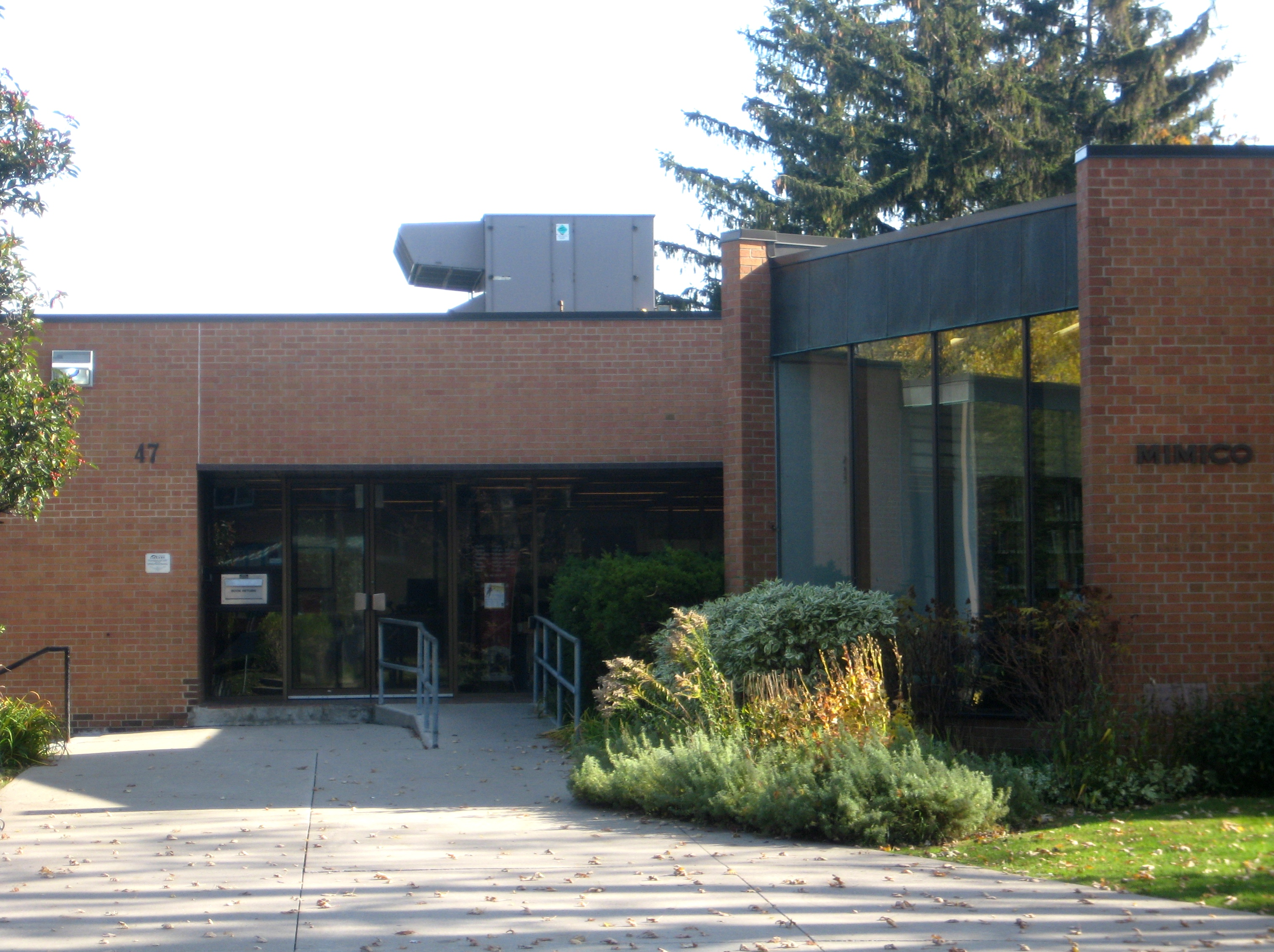
- Location: 47 Station Road; Toronto, Ontario; M8V 2R1
- Type: Public library system of Mimico
- Established: 1913

Collection
- Items collected: business directories, phone books, maps, government publications, books, periodicals, genealogy, local history,

Other information

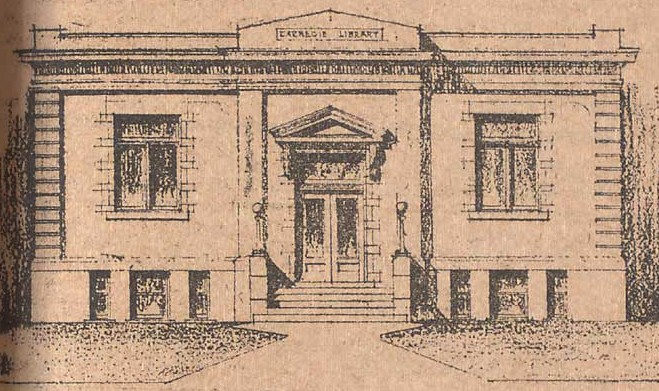
Carniegie Library (demolished)

The Mimico Centennial Library is a public library in Toronto, Ontario, Canada. It is a branch of the Toronto Public Library system and is located in the neighbourhood of Mimico in the former city of Etobicoke.

== History ==
It began as the Mimico Carnegie Library after the Village of Mimico held a plebiscite in 1913 to request funds for a Carnegie Library, several already having been built in Toronto. Mimico's population was below the threshold set for Carnegie grants but was nevertheless approved and in 1915 the Mimico Carnegie Library opened on Pigeon St (later combined with Stanley Avenue). In 1917 Mimico became a town and the town council used the library for its meetings until it purchased the old Mimico Wesleyan Methodist Church on Church St. (now Royal York Road) which was vacated by the Methodist Church after the construction of the new United Church.

Mimico's Imperial Order of the Daughters of the Empire placed two plaques in the Library after the First World War to commemorate the town's servicemen; one plaque for all who had fought, the other for Mimico's dead. In 1966, to celebrate Canada's centenary, the Carnegie Library became the only one of Canada's 42 Carnegie Libraries to be demolished (along with several homes on Stanley Ave. and Station Rd.) and a new 'Centennial Library' was built. The plaques commemorating Mimico's servicemen from the First World War were placed in a new 'Vimy Park' at Queens Ave and Lake Shore Blvd. In 1967 the Town of Mimico was annexed with the other Lake Shore municipalities, back into Etobicoke which became a borough.

== See also ==
- Mimico
- Carnegie Library
- Toronto Public Library
- Ask Ontario
- Ontario Public Libraries
