= David Ernest Hornell =

Second World War pilot, recipient of the Victoria Cross

David Ernest Hornell VC
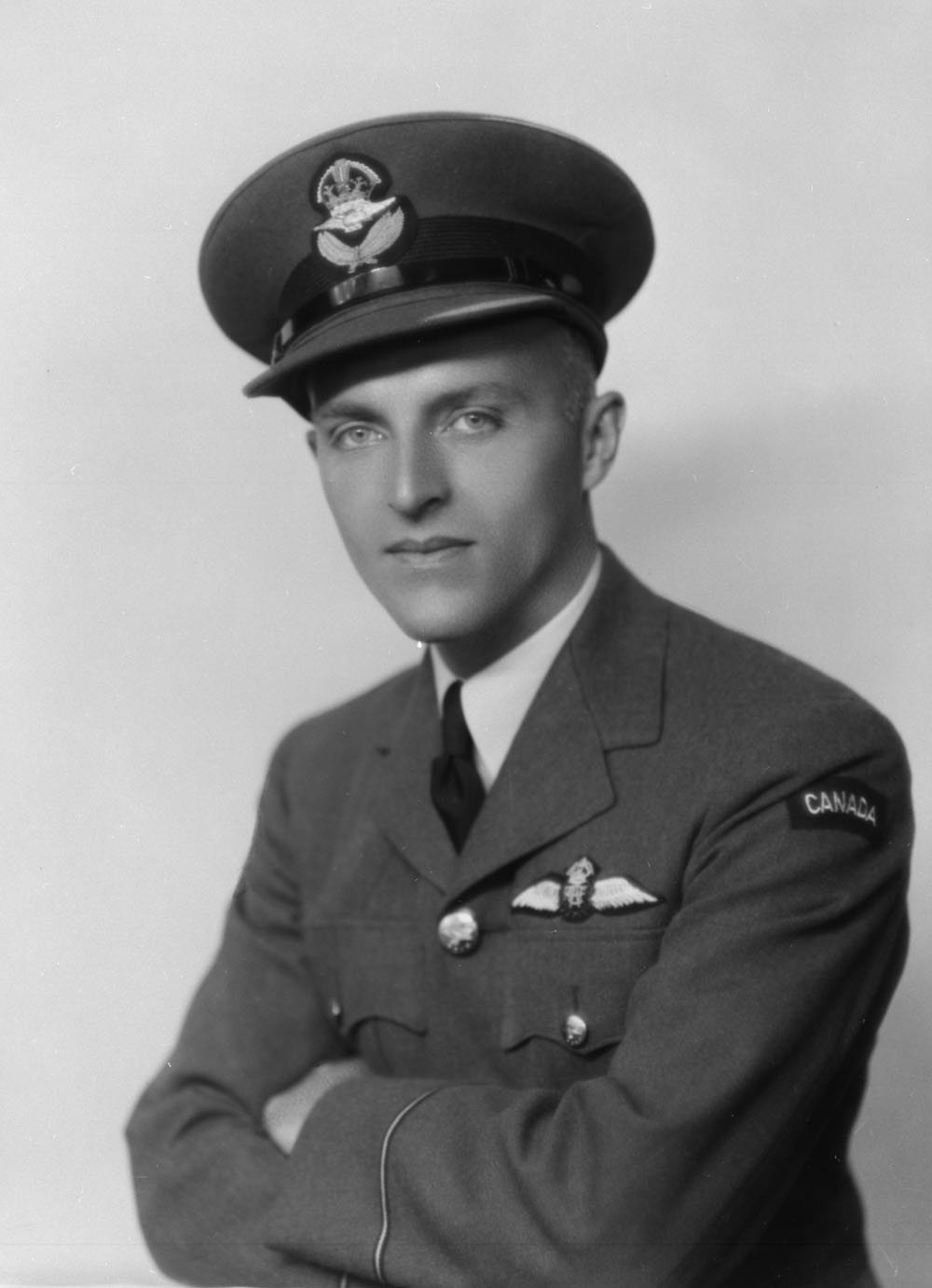
- Hornell in 1941
- Born: 26 January 1910; Mimico, Ontario, Canada
- Died: 24 June 1944 (aged 34); North Atlantic Ocean
- Burial place: Lerwick Cemetery, Shetland
- Military career
- Allegiance: Canada
- Branch: Royal Canadian Air Force
- Service years: 1941–1944
- Rank: Flight Lieutenant
- Unit: No. 162 Squadron RCAF
- Conflicts: Second World War: Atlantic War (DOW)
- Awards: Victoria Cross

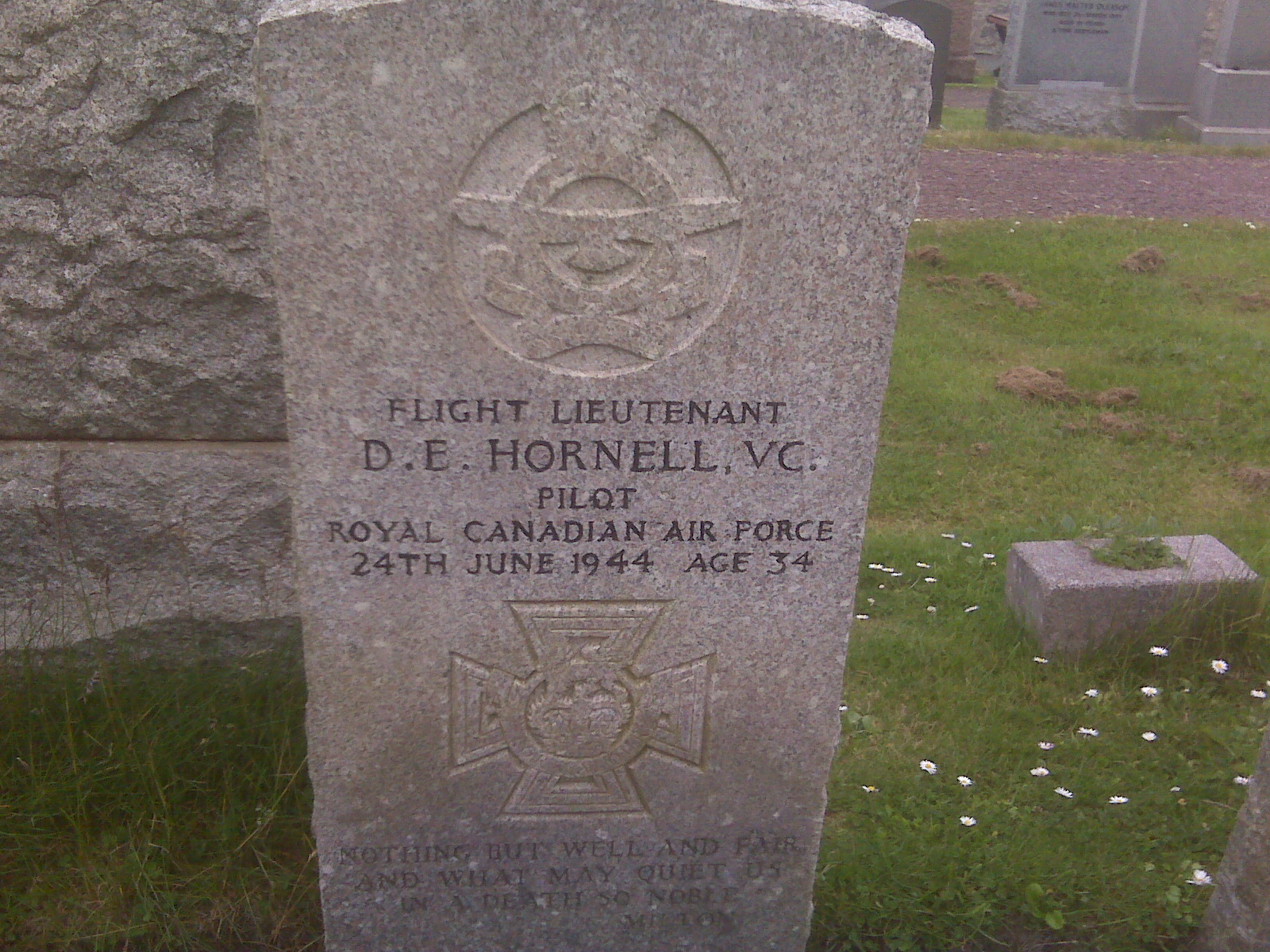
Hornell's burial site in Shetland, Scotland

David Ernest Hornell VC (26 January 1910 – 24 June 1944) was a Canadian recipient of the Victoria Cross, the highest and most prestigious award for gallantry in the face of the enemy that can be awarded to British and Commonwealth forces. He was the first member of the Royal Canadian Air Force to earn the Victoria Cross during the Second World War.

== Early life ==
David "Bud" Hornell was born on Toronto Island and spent his later childhood and adolescence in the Toronto suburb of Mimico. He attended Mimico High School, having obtained the Fred Werden scholarship, given in memory of the son of Mimico's postmaster, who was killed in the First World War.

== Second World War ==
He enlisted in the Royal Canadian Air Force in January 1941, and received his pilot's wings in September the same year. After further instruction in Charlottetown, Prince Edward Island, he was posted to the Royal Canadian Air Force station on North Vancouver Island. Commissioned in 1942, Flight Lieutenant Hornell completed 60 operational missions, involving some 600 hours flying.

=== Victoria Cross ===
Flight Lieutenant Hornell was flying as aircraft captain on a Consolidated Canso amphibian aircraft with 162 (Bomber Reconnaissance) Squadron, RCAF, from RAF Wick in Northern Scotland, when the following action took place for which he was awarded the VC.

On 24 June 1944 on sea patrol near the Faroes in the North Atlantic, Hornell and his crew sighted a German submarine travelling on the surface. They manoeuvred to attack, meanwhile being attacked and badly damaged by guns of the German submarine U-1225. With a wing on fire, Hornell and his crew continued the approach, dropped depth charges and sunk the submarine. Hornell then brought his burning aircraft down on the heavy swell. There was only one serviceable dinghy, which could not hold all the crew, so they took turns in the cold water.

By the time the survivors were rescued 21 hours later, Hornell was blind and weak from exposure and cold. He died shortly after being picked up. He is buried in Lerwick Cemetery, Shetland Islands.

==== Citation ====
Flight Lieutenant Hornell was captain and first pilot of a twin-engined amphibian aircraft engaged on an anti-submarine patrol in northern waters. The patrol had lasted for some hours when a fully-surfaced U-boat was sighted, travelling at high speed on the port beam. Flight Lieutenant Hornell at once turned to the attack.

The U-boat altered course. The aircraft had been seen and there could be no surprise. The U-boat opened up with anti-aircraft fire which became increasingly fierce and accurate.

At a range of 1,200 yards, the front guns of the aircraft replied; then its starboard guns jammed, leaving only one gun effective. Hits were obtained on and around the conning-tower of the U-boat, but the aircraft was itself hit, two large holes appearing in the starboard wing.

Ignoring the enemy’s fire, Flight Lieutenant Hornell carefully manoeuvred for the attack. Oil was pouring from his starboard engine, which was, by this time, on fire, as was the starboard wing; and the petrol tanks were endangered. Meanwhile, the aircraft was hit again and again by the U-boat’s guns. Holed in many places, it was vibrating violently and very difficult to control.

Nevertheless, the captain decided to press home his attack, knowing that with every moment the chances of escape for him and his gallant crew would grow more slender. He brought his aircraft down very low and released his depth charges in a perfect straddle. The bows of the U-boat were lifted out of the water; it sank and the crew were seen in the sea.

Flight Lieutenant Hornell contrived, by superhuman efforts at the controls, to gain a little height. The fire in the starboard wing had grown more intense and the vibration had increased. Then the burning engine fell off. The plight of aircraft and crew was now desperate. With the utmost coolness, the captain took his aircraft into wind and, despite the manifold dangers, brought it safely down on the heavy swell. Badly damaged and blazing furiously, the aircraft rapidly settled.

After ordeal by fire came ordeal by water. There was only one serviceable dinghy and this could not hold all the crew. So they took turns in the water, holding on to the sides. Once, the dinghy capsized in the rough seas and was righted only with great difficulty. Two of the crew succumbed from exposure.

An airborne lifeboat was dropped to them but fell some 500 yards down wind. The men struggled vainly to reach it and Flight Lieutenant Hornell, who throughout had encouraged them by his cheerfulness and inspiring leadership, proposed to swim to it, through he was nearly exhausted. He was with difficulty restrained. The survivors were finally rescued after they had been in the water for 21 hours. By this time Flight Lieutenant Hornell was blinded and completely exhausted. He died shortly after being picked up.

Flight Lieutenant Hornell had completed 60 operational missions, involving 600 hours’ flying. He well knew the danger and difficulties attending attacks on submarines. By pressing home a skilful and successful attack against fierce opposition, with his aircraft in a precarious condition, and by fortifying and encouraging his comrades in the subsequent ordeal, this officer displayed valour and devotion to duty of the highest order.

== Legacy ==
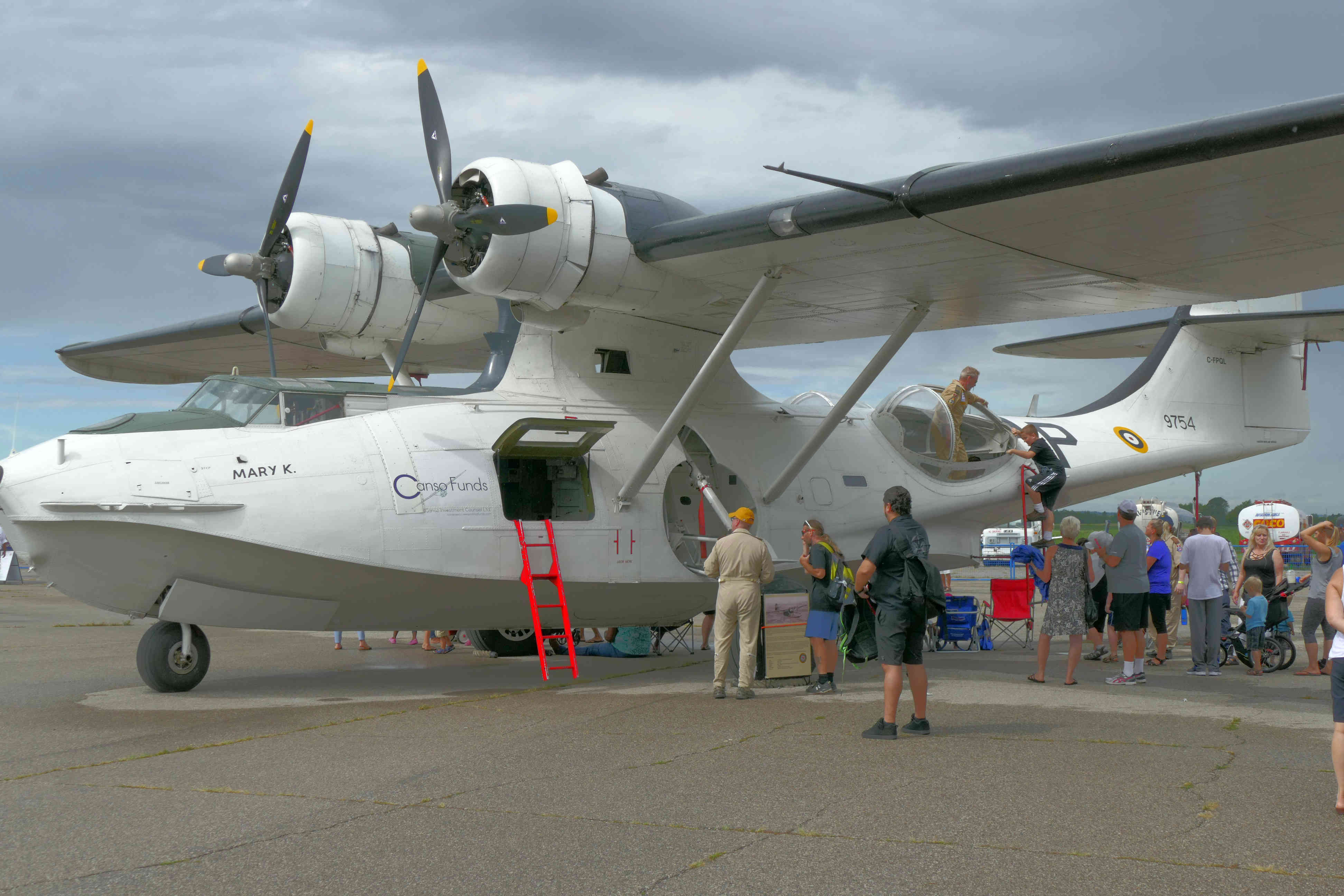
Hornell's memorial Canso in 2018

David Hornell Junior School, an elementary school in Mimico is named after him.

The Canso aircraft in the collection of the Canadian Warplane Heritage Museum in Hamilton, Ontario, was restored in the colours and markings of 162 (Bomber Reconnaissance) Squadron and dedicated to the memory of Flight Lieutenant David Hornell, VC.

A squadron of the Royal Canadian Air Cadets in the west end of Toronto, Ontario, is named after him.

A Toronto Island Airport ferry is named after Hornell

The Wing Operations building at CFB 14 Wing Greenwood, Nova Scotia, Canada is named after Hornell.

His Victoria Cross is on loan to 1 Canadian Air Division Headquarters in Winnipeg and is on display at the Air Force Heritage Museum. A Toronto branch of the Royal Canadian Legion has been named in Hornells honor.Branch 643 Flight Leiutenant David Hornell was formed in 2017.
