= Wesley Mimico United Church =

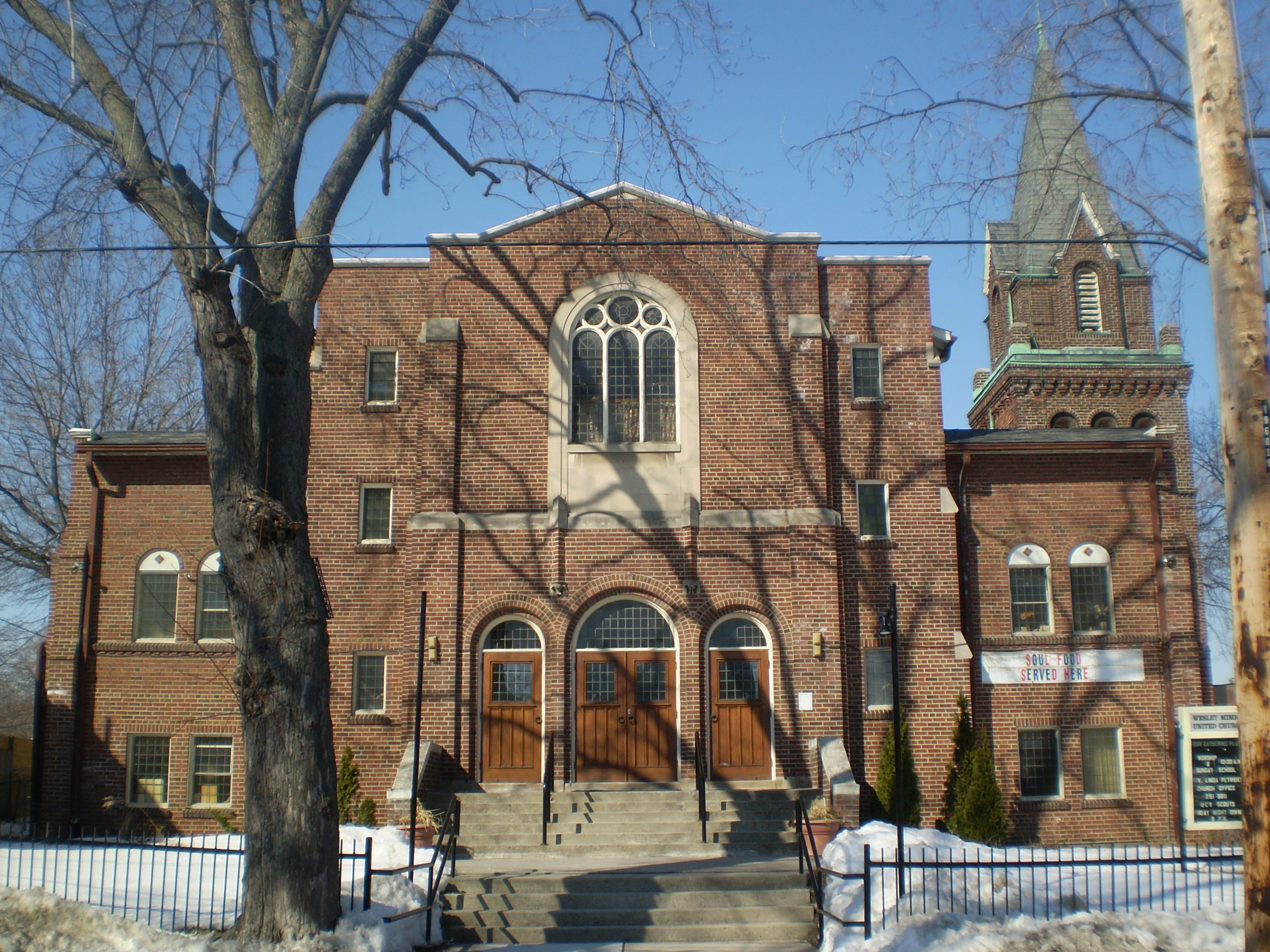
- Wesley Mimico United Church

- Location in Toronto
- 43°36′51.5″N 79°29′18.8″W
- Location: 2405 Lake Shore Boulevard West; Unit 405; Toronto, Ontario; M8V 1C5
- Denomination: United Church of Canada
- Previous denomination: Methodist; Presbyterian
- Website: wmuc.ca

History
- Former name(s): Methodist Church, Mimico and St. Paul's Presbyterian
- Status: Local congregation

Architecture
- Functional status: Active
- Architectural type: Norman-Gothic

Wesley Mimico United Church is a church in Toronto, Ontario, Canada. It is located in the neighbourhood of Mimico in the former city of Etobicoke. The church was created by the union of the former Wesley Methodist Church, Mimico and St. Paul's Presbyterian Church in 1927, of which the Methodist church was the larger partner.

== History ==
=== Methodist Heritage ===
Early Methodists were served by ministers working a 'circuit' of communities the earliest of which west of Toronto was the Cooksville (Mississauga) branch of the (rural) Toronto circuit which began about 1845. Five years later in 1850, with the creation of Etobicoke Township a Mimico branch of the Cooksville circuit was opened which quickly built a church in the original Postal Village of Mimico in central Etobicoke (Dundas at Islington) and identified itself as a Wesleyan Congregation. By 1858 with the building of the railway through today's Mimico and the establishment of a Mimico Station and Post Office with a subdivision plan for a Town of Mimico, a Mimico Branch of Etobicoke central Wesley Church (formerly Mimico) was established using the old Mimico Schoolhouse at Church St (Royal York) across from Mimico Ave. In 1862 the Mimico Branch of the Wesleyan Methodist Church purchased property across the street from the old Mimico Schoolhouse on Church St (Royal York) across from Drummond where a church was built by 1864 establishing Mimico's Wesleyan Methodist Church. Although the 1850s subdivision plan for Mimico had failed, the postal village remaining a rural area, in 1890 a new plan was prepared which eventually led to Mimico becoming a Town and in 1890 the Methodist Church built a Manse on Mimico Ave on the south side just east of Wheatfield.

Of the early Methodists in Mimico the main families were:

- The Hendrys (who farmed the lot east from Church St now Royal York north from the lake)
- The Englishes (The first of whom was the original Methodist preacher while Mimico was still a branch of the Wesleyan Church on Dundas. Also principal John English after whom the Mimico school was eventually named)
- The Gaulds (Including George Gauld, an early School Trustee and superintendent of the former Victoria Industrial School (later moved to Guelph, the remains of the older institution becoming the Mimico Correctional Centre) after whom Mimico's second elementary school, George R. Gauld Junior School, built to serve Mimico's northern half, was named) This family also intermarried with the Davidsons, the family of the developer of the Humber Bay neighbourhood just east of Mimico.

=== Church Union ===
The united congregation used the new church built by the former Methodist congregation on Mimico Avenue at Station Road on the west side in the heart of Mimico. Mimico Town Council, which had been meeting in the Mimico Carnegie Library, purchased the old Methodist Church to be the Town Hall while the old Methodist Manse on Queens Ave at Mimico became Hogle's Funeral Home. The first term of union between the two former parishes was for a dual pastorate for the first year and then the election of a new pastor. When the year had ended, one of the resigning pastors, Rev. Fingald, was still the preferred choice for united pastor among the majority of the congregation creating some friction. Those Presbyterians who wished to remain outside the union refounded the Mimico Presbyterian Church and were permitted to have the old Presbyterian Church building at Mimico Ave and Church St (Royal York Rd).

=== After Union ===
Quickly following the union, Mimico was badly hit by the Great Depression and, like the other churches in Mimico and the Town of Mimico itself, the Wesley Mimico United Church found itself deeply in debt. The congregation celebrated the centennial of the former Methodist church (older and larger than the former Presbyterian Church) in 1964 with the publication of a parish history which also included a history of the Presbyterian church. Wesley Mimico United Church has been faced with great challenges in keeping the church alive as the demographics in Mimico have greatly changed since the town was annexed first to Etobicoke (1967) then to Toronto (1997).

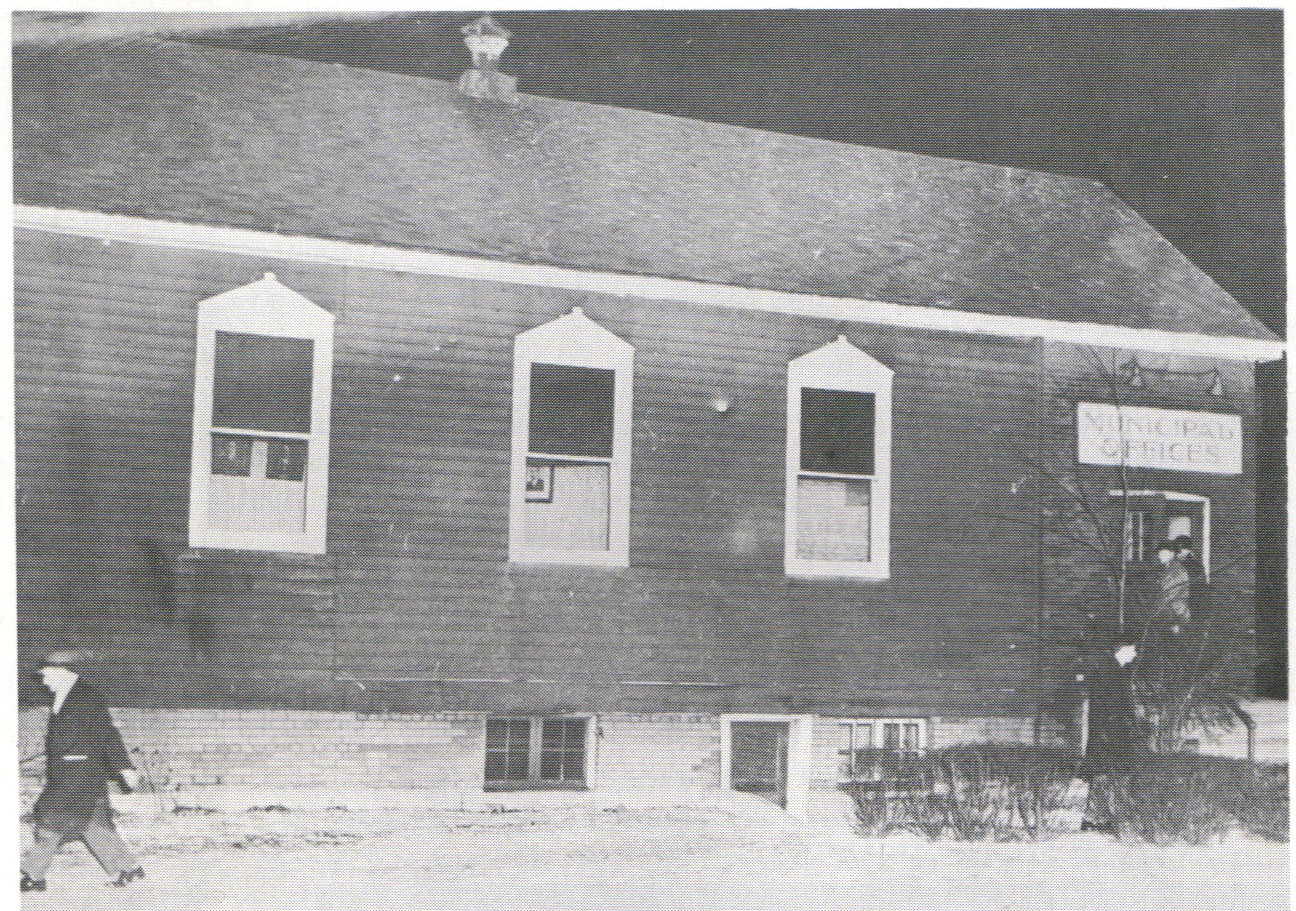
Former Mimico Town Hall (Previously Wesley Methodist Church)

== See also ==
- Mimico
- United Church of Canada
