= German submarine U-1225 =

German World War II submarine

Coordinates: 63°00′N 0°50′W

History

Nazi Germany
- Name: U-1225
- Ordered: 25 August 1941
- Builder: Deutsche Werft, Hamburg
- Yard number: 388
- Laid down: 28 December 1942
- Launched: 21 July 1943
- Commissioned: 10 November 1943
- Fate: Sunk on 24 June 1944

General characteristics
- Class & type: Type IXC/40 submarine
- Displacement: 1,144 t (1,126 long tons) surfaced; 1,257 t (1,237 long tons) submerged
- Length: 76.76 m (251 ft 10 in) o/a; 58.75 m (192 ft 9 in) pressure hull
- Beam: 6.86 m (22 ft 6 in) o/a; 4.44 m (14 ft 7 in) pressure hull
- Height: 9.60 m (31 ft 6 in)
- Draught: 4.67 m (15 ft 4 in)
- Installed power: 4,400 PS (3,200 kW; 4,300 bhp) (diesels); 1,000 PS (740 kW; 990 shp) (electric)
- Propulsion: 2 shafts; 2 × diesel engines; 2 × electric motors
- Speed: 18.3 knots (33.9 km/h; 21.1 mph) surfaced; 7.3 knots (13.5 km/h; 8.4 mph) submerged
- Range: 13,850 nmi (25,650 km; 15,940 mi) at 10 knots (19 km/h; 12 mph) surfaced; 63 nmi (117 km; 72 mi) at 4 knots (7.4 km/h; 4.6 mph) submerged
- Test depth: 230 m (750 ft)
- Complement: 4 officers, 44 enlisted
- Armament: 6 × torpedo tubes (4 bow, 2 stern); 22 × 53.3 cm (21 in) torpedoes; 1 × 3.7 cm (1.5 in) Flak M42 AA gun; 2 x twin 2 cm (0.79 in) C/30 AA guns

Service record
- Part of: 31st U-boat Flotilla; 10 November 1943 – 31 May 1944; 2nd U-boat Flotilla; 1 – 24 June 1944
- Identification codes: M 53 196
- Commanders: Oblt.z.S. Ernst Sauerberg; 10 November 1943 – 24 June 1944; Oblt.z.S. Ekkehard Scherraus; 15 May – 12 June 1944
- Operations: 1 patrol: 20 – 24 June 1944
- Victories: None

German submarine U-1225 was a Type IXC/40 U-boat of Nazi Germany's Kriegsmarine during World War II.

The submarine was laid down on 28 December 1942 at the Deutsche Werft yard at Hamburg and served as a training unit until transferred into active service 31 May 1944. Four days after leaving port for her first patrol, U-1225 was attacked by a RCAF Catalina and both were lost. All 56 sailors and 3 out of 8 aircrew perished.

== Design ==
German Type IXC/40 submarines were slightly larger than the original Type IXCs. U-1225 had a displacement of 1,144 tonnes (1,126 long tons) when at the surface and 1,257 tonnes (1,237 long tons) while submerged. The U-boat had a total length of 76.76 m (251 ft 10 in), a pressure hull length of 58.75 m (192 ft 9 in), a beam of 6.86 m (22 ft 6 in), a height of 9.60 m (31 ft 6 in), and a draught of 4.67 m (15 ft 4 in). The submarine was powered by two MAN M 9 V 40/46 supercharged four-stroke, nine-cylinder diesel engines producing a total of 4,400 metric horsepower (3,240 kW; 4,340 shp) for use while surfaced, two Siemens-Schuckert 2 GU 345/34 double-acting electric motors producing a total of 1,000 shaft horsepower (1,010 PS; 750 kW) for use while submerged. She had two shafts and two 1.92 m (6 ft) propellers. The boat was capable of operating at depths of up to 230 metres (750 ft).

The submarine had a maximum surface speed of 18.3 knots (33.9 km/h; 21.1 mph) and a maximum submerged speed of 7.3 knots (13.5 km/h; 8.4 mph). When submerged, the boat could operate for 63 nautical miles (117 km; 72 mi) at 4 knots (7.4 km/h; 4.6 mph); when surfaced, she could travel 13,850 nautical miles (25,650 km; 15,940 mi) at 10 knots (19 km/h; 12 mph). U-1225 was fitted with six 53.3 cm (21 in) torpedo tubes (four fitted at the bow and two at the stern), 22 torpedoes, and a 3.7 cm (1.5 in) Flak M42 as well as two twin 2 cm (0.79 in) C/30 anti-aircraft guns. The boat had a complement of forty-eight.

== Service history ==
The submarine was laid down on 28 December 1942 at the Deutsche Werft yard at Hamburg, launched on 21 July 1943, and commissioned on 10 November 1943 under the command of Oberleutnant zur See Ernst Sauerberg. The U-boat then served with 31st U-boat Flotilla, a training unit, until 31 May 1944. She was then transferred to the 2nd U-boat Flotilla for active service.

U-1225 had a short career in active service. She departed Kristiansand on 20 June 1944. Four days out of port, the new submarine was attacked by Canso aircraft of No. 162 Squadron RCAF. The flying boat was shot down, but not before her depth charges fatally wounded the U-boat. All 56 sailors went down with the sub. Three of the eight aircrew from the Catalina were lost as well. The pilot, David Ernest Hornell, was awarded a posthumous Victoria Cross.

== Bibliography ==
- Bishop, Chris (2006). Kriegsmarine U-Boats, 1939–45. London: Amber Books. ISBN 978-1-904687-96-2.
- Busch, Rainer; Röll, Hans-Joachim (1999). German U-boat commanders of World War II : a biographical dictionary. Translated by Brooks, Geoffrey. London, Annapolis, Md: Greenhill Books, Naval Institute Press. ISBN 1-55750-186-6.
- Gröner, Erich; Jung, Dieter; Maass, Martin (1991). German Warships 1815–1945, U-boats and Mine Warfare Vessels. Vol. 2. Translated by Thomas, Keith; Magowan, Rachel. London: Conway Maritime Press. ISBN 0-85177-593-4.
