= No. 162 Squadron RCAF =

162 Osprey Squadron RCAF
- Active: 1942-1945
- Disbanded: 7 August 1945
- Country: Canada
- Allegiance: Canada
- Branch: Royal Canadian Air Force
- Role: Bomber Reconnaissance
- Part of: Eastern Air Command, RAF Coastal Command
- Nickname(s): Osprey
- Motto(s): Sectabimur usque per ima. (We will hunt them even through the lowest deeps)
- Engagements: Second World War: Battle of the Atlantic; Battle of the St. Lawrence
- Battle honours: North-West Atlantic 1942-44

Commanders
- Wing Commander (W/C): C. W. G. Chapman

Aircraft flown
- Bomber: Consolidated Canso

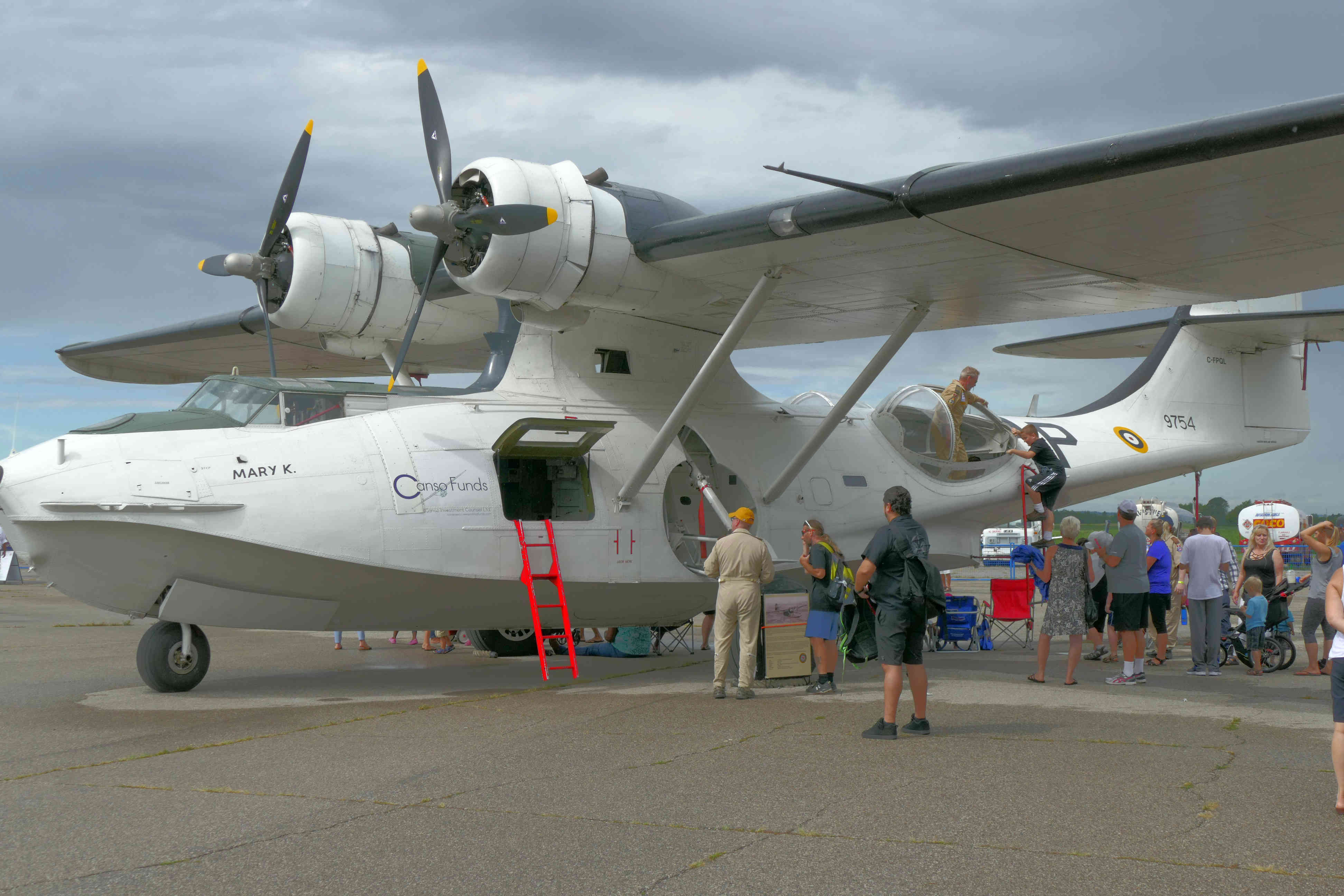
No. 162 Squadron Aircraft "P" in 2018 (restoration)

No. 162 Squadron RCAF was a unit of Royal Canadian Air Force Eastern Air Command. Formed as a bomber reconnaissance squadron at RCAF Station Yarmouth, Nova Scotia, Canada on 19 May 1942 with Canso A aircraft, the squadron spent an uneventful eighteen months on east coast anti-submarine duty. In January 1944, it was seconded to RAF Coastal Command and moved to RAF Reykjavik, Iceland to cover the mid-ocean portion of the North Atlantic shipping route. On April 17, Flying Officer T. C. Cooke and his crew attacked and sank U-342 while on a meteorological flight west of Iceland.

In May 1944, a large detachment of the squadron moved east to RAF Wick, Scotland to support the invasion of Normandy. Its task was to intercept U-boats operating from Norwegian ports. While in Scotland, No. 162 sank four German submarines and shared in the sinking of a fifth that tried to break through the North Transit Area to attack the Allied D-Day invasion fleet. These engagements took place in the Norwegian Sea roughly 200 miles north of the Shetland Islands, for example at 63°28′00″N 000°43′00″W.

Flight Lieutenant (F/L) D.E. Hornell won the Victoria Cross for attacking and sinking U-1225 on June 24, 1944, despite withering anti-aircraft fire from the U-boat.

No. 162 left RAF Wick for Camp Maple Leaf at RAF Reykjavik in August, and remained there until it returned to Canada in June 1945. It was the RCAF's most successful anti-submarine squadron during the Second World War with five U-boats destroyed, one shared sinking and one U-boat damaged. The squadron flew the Canso during its entire operational lifetime. From the beginning of operations until the end of the war, the squadron flew 2,100 sorties and lost 6 aircraft and 34 crew on operations, with a further 3 aircraft and 8 crew lost non-operationally.

The squadron was disbanded at Sydney, Nova Scotia on August 7, 1945.

A Canso at the Canadian Warplane Heritage Museum is restored in the markings and colors of No. 162 Squadron, Royal Canadian Air Force. The museum is located in Hamilton, Ontario.

== Honours and awards ==
- Victoria Cross (VC) - 1
- Distinguished Service Order (DSO) - 2
- Member of the Order of the British Empire (MBE) - 2
- Distinguished Flying Cross (United Kingdom) (DFC) - 16
- Air Force Cross (United Kingdom) (AFC) - 3
- Distinguished Flying Medal (DFM) - 4
- British Empire Medal (BEM) - 1
- Mentioned in Dispatches (MiD)- 21
