= Dwight Ross =

Royal Canadian Air Force officer

Arthur Dwight Ross
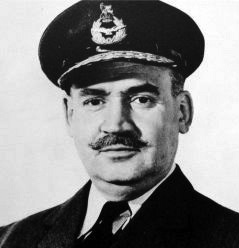
- Arthur Dwight Ross
- Born: 18 March 1907; Winnipeg, Manitoba, Canada
- Died: 27 September 1981 (aged 74) Kingston, Ontario, Canada
- Allegiance: Canada
- Branch: Royal Canadian Air Force
- Service years: 1929–1961
- Rank: Air Commodore
- Commands: No. 5 Squadron; No. 3 Service Flying Training School; RAF Middleton St. George; No. 62 Base, No. 6 Group RCAF; RCAF Staff College; Canadian Western Altlantic Sub-area (NATO)
- Conflicts: Second World War
- Awards: George Cross; Commander of the Order of the British Empire; Canadian Forces' Decoration

Air Commodore Arthur Dwight Ross GC, CBE, CD (18 March 1907 – 27 September 1981) was a Royal Canadian Air Force (RCAF) Base Commander of No. 62 Base, No. 6 Group RCAF in Yorkshire, England during the Second World War. Ross received the George Cross for his actions on the night of 27/28 June 1944 at RAF Tholthorpe.

== Early life and career ==
Arthur Dwight Ross was born on 18 March 1907, in Winnipeg, Manitoba, Canada. After graduating from the Royal Military College of Canada in Kingston, Ontario in 1928 (student # 1815), he took a commission in the Royal Canadian Air Force. Ross received his pilot's wings at Camp Borden in February 1929.

== Second World War ==
After a few years of aerial surveying and staffing work, Ross was appointed commander of No. 5 (Bomber Reconnaissance) Squadron on Canada's east coast in 1939 where he flew on anti-submarine and convoy escort operations.

From August 1940 to March 1942, he worked with the British Commonwealth Air Training Plan as the officer commanding No. 3 Service Flying Training School (SFTS), at Currie Field in Calgary, Alberta.

In December 1942, Ross became the Commanding Officer at RAF Middleton St. George. In February 1944 he was promoted from Group Captain to Air Commodore and was assigned to command No. 62 Base, No. 6 Group RCAF, headquartered at RAF Linton-on-Ouse. While visiting the base's sub-station at RAF Tholthorpe, an incident occurred which earned Ross the George Cross, the highest gallantry award for civilians as well as for military personnel in actions which are not in the face of the enemy. The incident also resulted in awards being earned by other personnel.

=== George Cross ===
During the night of 27/28 June 1944, an RCAF Halifax aircraft of 425 Squadron was returning from a bombing raid on a flying bomb launching site in northern France. The aircraft struggled back on three engines. Upon landing, the pilot, Sergeant M.J.P. Lavoie, lost control and veered his aircraft into a parked Halifax which was fully loaded with fuel and bombs. The George Cross citation explains the incident in detail:

Ross's George Cross citation reads:

St. James's Palace, S.W.1, 27th October, 1944.

The KING has been graciously pleased to approve the following awards of the GEORGE CROSS, the George Medal and the British Empire Medal (Military Division) to the undermentioned:

Awarded The GEORGE CROSS.

Air Commodore Arthur Dwight Ross, O.B.E., Royal Canadian Air Force.

Awarded the George Medal.

Can/R.96959 Flight Sergeant Joseph Rene Marcel St. Germain, Royal Canadian Air Force.

Can/R.87217 Corporal Maurice Marquet, Royal Canadian Air Force.

Awarded the British Empire Medal (Military Division).

Can /R.273581 Leading Aircraftman Melvin Muir McKenzie, Royal Canadian Air Force.

Can/R.188008 Leading Aircraftman Robert Rubin Wolfe, Royal Canadian Air Force.

One night in June, 1944, an aircraft, while attempting to land, crashed into another which was parked in the dispersal area and fully loaded with bombs. The former aircraft had broken into 3 parts and was burning furiously. Air Commodore Ross was at the airfield to attend the return of aircraft from operations and the interrogation of aircrews. Flight Sergeant St. Germain a bomb aimer, had just returned from an operational sortie and Corporal Marquet was in charge of the night ground crew, whilst leading Aircraftmen McKenzie and Wolfe were members of the crew of the crash tender. Air Commodore Ross with the assistance of Corporal Marquet, extricated the pilot who had sustained severe injuries. At that moment ten 500 Ib. bombs in the second aircraft, about 80 yards away, exploded, and this officer and airman were hurled to the ground. When the hail of debris had subsided, cries were heard from the rear turret of the crashed aircraft. Despite further explosions from bombs and petrol tanks which might have occurred, Air Commodore Ross and Corporal Marquet returned to the blazing wreckage and endeavoured in vain to swing the turret to release the rear gunner. Although the port tail plane was blazing furiously, Air Commodore Ross hacked at the perspex with an axe and then handed the axe through the turret to the rear gunner who enlarged the aperture. Taking the axe again the air commodore, assisted now by Flight Sergeant St. Germain as well as by Corporal Marquet, finally broke the perspex steel frame supports and extricated the rear gunner. Another 500 lb. bomb exploded which threw the 3 rescuers to the ground. Flight Sergeant St. Germain quickly rose and threw himself upon a victim in order to shield him from flying debris.

Air Commodore Ross's arm was practically severed between the wrist and elbow by the second explosion. He calmly walked to the ambulance and an emergency amputation was performed on arrival at station sick quarters. Meanwhile, Corporal Marquet had inspected the surroundings, and seeing petrol running down towards two nearby aircraft, directed their removal from the vicinity by tractor. Leading Aircraftmen McKenzie and Wolfe rendered valuable assistance in trying to bring the fire under control and they also helped to extricate the trapped rear gunner both being seriously injured by flying debris. Air Commodore Ross showed fine leadership and great heroism in an action which resulted in the saving of the lives of the pilot and rear gunner. He was ably assisted by Flight Sergeant St. Germain and Corporal Marquet who both displayed courage of a high order. Valuable service was also rendered by Leading Aircraftmen McKenzie and Wolfe in circumstances of great danger.

== Postwar ==
From 1945 to 1948, Ross commanded the RCAF Staff College in Toronto, Ontario. Until 1961, Ross was Air Commander of the Western Atlantic Area's Canadian Atlantic sub-area of NATO's Allied Command Atlantic. This command's purpose was to keep the sea lanes open between the United States and Europe during the Cold War.

== Tributes ==
An air cadet squadron based in Kingston, Ontario bears his name (No. 58 Air Commodore A. Dwight Ross, GC, CBE, CD Royal Canadian Air Cadet Squadron).

Dwight Ross School in Greenwood, Nova Scotia is also named after him.

== See also ==
- List of Royal Military College of Canada people
- List of George Cross recipients

Military offices
| Preceded by Clifford McEwen | Air Officer Commanding No. 62 Base; February – June 1944 | Succeeded by Johnny Fauquier |
