= Tiger Force (air) =

British long-range heavy bomber force during World War II

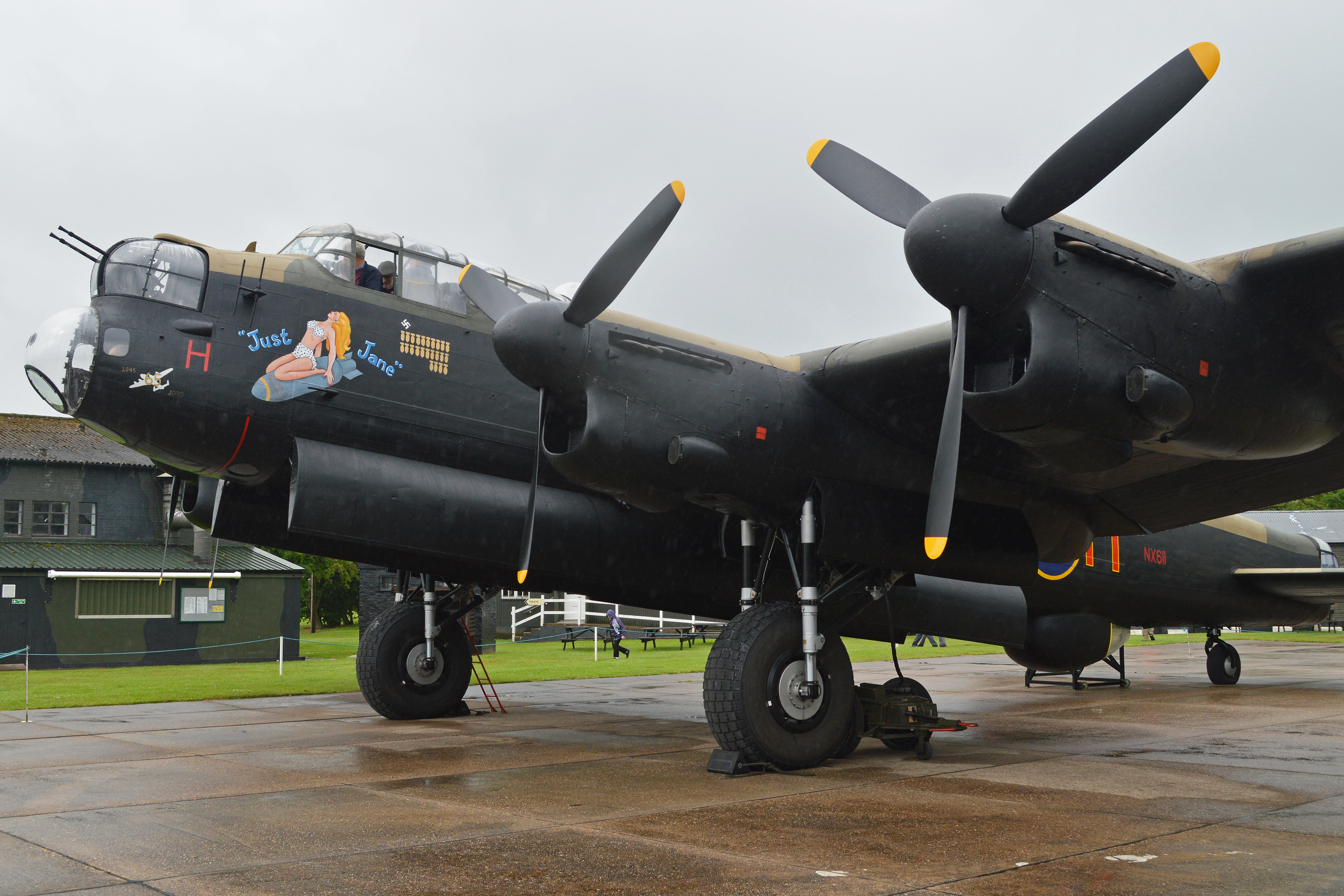

Tiger Force, also known as the Very Long Range Bomber Force, was the name given to a World War II British Empire long-range heavy bomber force, formed in 1945, from squadrons serving with RAF Bomber Command in Europe, for proposed use against targets in Japan. The unit was scheduled to be deployed to Okinawa in the Pacific theatre in the lead-up to the Allies' proposed invasion of Japan. The unit was disbanded after the bombings of Hiroshima and Nagasaki and the Soviet invasion of Manchuria ended the war.

== History ==
At the Quebec Conference of September 1944, the British Prime Minister Winston Churchill proposed to transfer a large part of Bomber Command to the Pacific, once Nazi Germany was defeated, comprising from 500 to 1,000 heavy bombers. US President Franklin D. Roosevelt accepted the offer, stating that a "long and costly struggle" still lay ahead of the Allies.

The offer made at the Second Quebec Conference (Octagon) in September 1944 was for forty squadrons of long-range bombers, of which 20 would act as tankers in flight; to operate against the inner zone and Japan. The Air Ministry prepared a provisional plan for three Groups, each of 12 squadrons of heavy bombers and 6 squadrons of long-range fighters (including one Canadian fighter and two Canadian bomber squadrons). Air Marshal Sir Hugh Lloyd was designated commander in November 1944. It was expected that American bases would be used, but they said their resources were stretched and asked that the British provide their own bases. In March 1945 the only area for bases was (undeveloped) northern Luzon in the Philippines. Estimates were that a base in the Calgayan Valley for 20 squadrons of heavy bombers and three squadrons of support aircraft would require 56,000 men to build and develop it, with 19,000 retained thereafter (being in American territory fighter squadrons would not be needed for its defence). But the Americans had more facilities on Okinawa than expected, and on 30 May offered bases there for ten British squadrons immediately. This was accepted by the British Chiefs of Staff on 4 June, and on 11 June their advisors said that the new base would require 37,400 men, 15,000 for operations and the rest for construction and administration (the Army could supply 12,400, and the air force 7,500 engineers) On 14 June the Chiefs of Staff decided to send ships without waiting for the Americans to supply the Pacific routing. A cargo ship left Liverpool on 20 June with vehicles and stores, and a faster ship left on 7 July with 3,000 men.

The proposed force was soon scaled back to 22 squadrons in three groups: one British Royal Air Force (RAF), one Royal Canadian Air Force (RCAF) and one from various air forces. By late 1945 this had been scaled back to 10 squadrons in two composite groups, made up of RAF, RCAF, Royal Australian Air Force (RAAF) and Royal New Zealand Air Force (RNZAF) squadrons. Tiger Force was to have been based on Okinawa and would have used Avro Lancasters, Avro Lincolns (the latest development of the Lancaster) and Consolidated Liberators.

RCAF Lancasters planned for inclusion in Tiger Force departed RAF Middleton St George on 31 May 1945 for modification in Canada prior to deployment in the Pacific Theatre. Before VJ Day, 141 RCAF Lancasters made the trip to RCAF Station Moncton for modification to Tiger Force requirements.

Two RAF fighter squadrons had begun converting to the new Hawker Tempest II at RAF Chilbolton, in order to perform escort duties, when the war ended. Escorts would also have been available from the fighter units of the U.S. Far East Air Force, the Australian First Tactical Air Force and/or other Empire units.

The colour scheme for Tiger Force aircraft was white upper-surfaces with black undersides; this scheme, developed to reflect sunlight and thus lower the internal temperatures in the tropical heat, despite the cancellation of operations against Japan, was apparent on many post-war Lancasters and Lincolns. To enable the aircraft to operate at the long distances involved, flight refuelling using Liberator tankers was to have been employed, using equipment developed by Flight Refuelling Ltd.

Tiger Force was officially disbanded on 31 October 1945, by which stage it included only British units.

== Order of battle ==
Tiger Force - Order of Battle (15 August 1945)
No. 5 Group, Royal Air Force		No. 6 Group, Royal Canadian Air Force	
No. 551 Wing RAF	No. 83 Squadron RAF; No. 97 Squadron RAF; No. 627 Squadron RAF	No. 661 Wing RCAF	No. 431 Squadron RCAF; No. 434 Squadron RCAF
No. 552 Wing RAF	No. 106 Squadron RAF; No. 467 Squadron RAAF; No. 544 Squadron RAF	No. 662 Wing RCAF	No. 419 Squadron RCAF; No. 428 Squadron RCAF
No. 553 Wing RAF	No. 57 Squadron RAF; No. 460 Squadron RAAF	No. 663 Wing RCAF	No. 420 Squadron RCAF; No. 425 Squadron RCAF
No. 554 Wing RAF	No. 75 Squadron RNZAF; No. 207 Squadron RAF	No. 664 Wing RCAF	No. 405 Squadron RCAF; No. 408 Squadron RCAF
Special Missions Wing	No. 9 Squadron RAF; No. 617 Squadron RAF		
Reserve forces	No. 49 Squadron RAF; No. 189 Squadron RAF		
Support units	Communications Flight; Air-Sea Rescue Squadron	Support units	Communications Flight
