= No. 428 Squadron RCAF =

No. 428 (Ghost) Squadron RCAF
- Active: 7 November 1942 – 5 September 1945; 21 June 1954 – 1 June 1961
- Country: Canada
- Branch: Royal Canadian Air Force
- Role: Bomber/All-Weather Fighter
- Part of: Royal Air Force 1942–1945
- Nickname: Ghost
- Mottos: Latin: Usque ad finem "To the very end"

Insignia
- Squadron Badge heraldry: In a shroud, a death's head
- Squadron Codes: NA (Nov 1942 – May 1946)

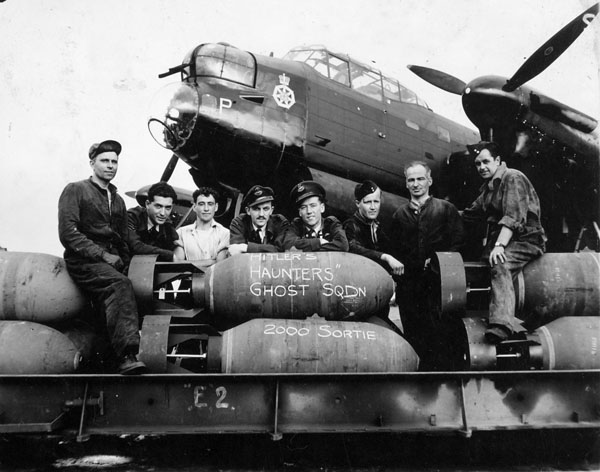
Aircrew and groundcrew of Avro Lancaster KB760 NA:P "P-Peter", from No. 428 Squadron RCAF. The badge for the Imperial Order Daughters of the Empire is visible on the nose. Photo taken after the squadron's 2,000th sortie, a raid on Bremen, Germany.

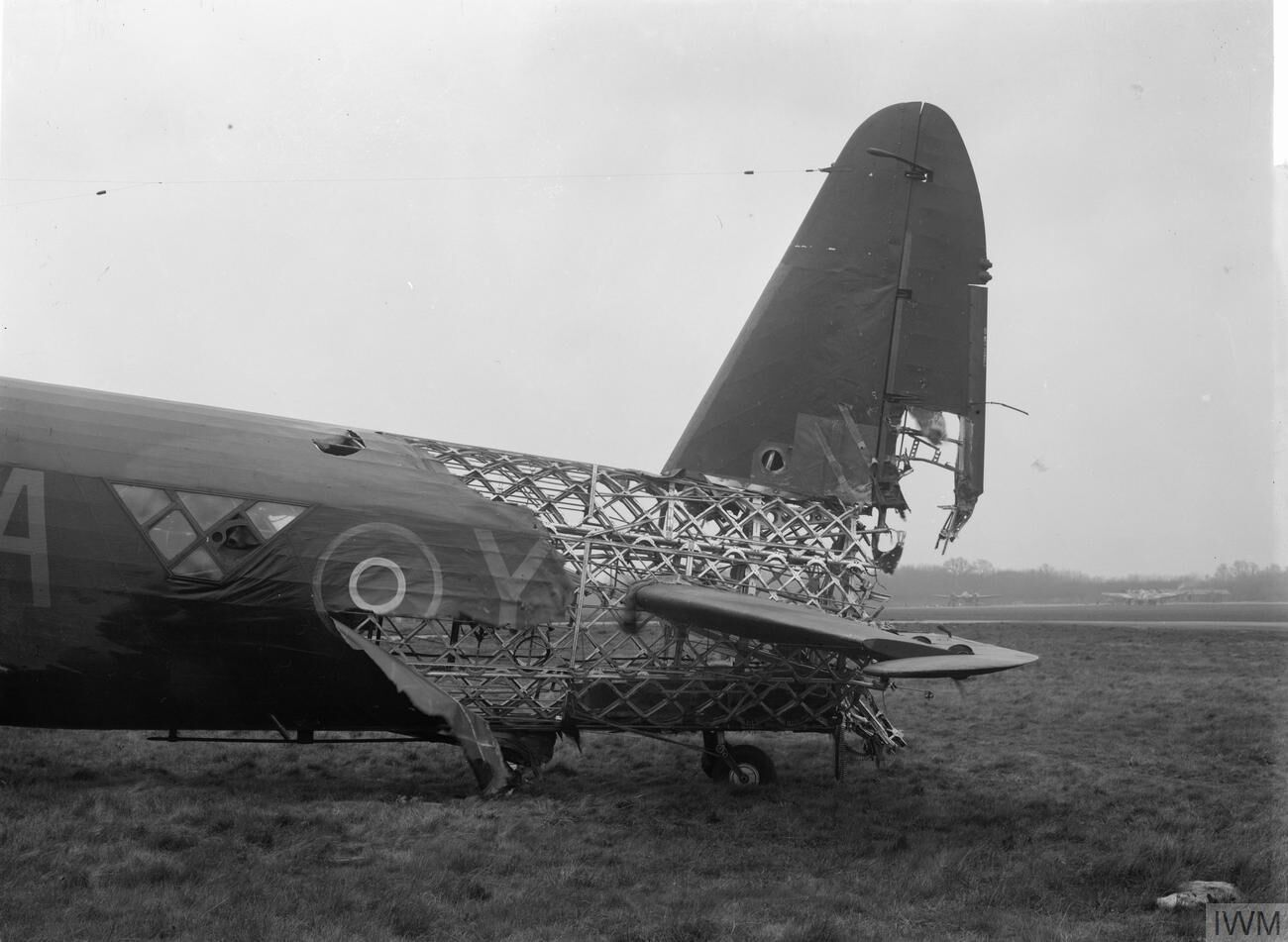
Damage to a Vickers Wellington Mark X, HE239 'NA-Y', of No. 428 Squadron RCAF. The aircraft was hit by anti-aircraft fire, while approaching its target at Duisburg, Germany on April 8–9, 1943.

No. 428 Squadron RCAF, also known as 428 Bomber Squadron, and 428 Ghost Squadron, was first a night bomber squadron of the Royal Canadian Air Force engaged in strategic bombing during World War II, based in Yorkshire. At the end of the war the squadron moved to Nova Scotia before being disbanded in September 1945. In 1954 the squadron was reformed as 428 All-Weather (Fighter) Squadron, before being again disbanded in 1961.

The motto of the squadron is Usque ad finem (Latin: "To the very end") and the squadron's badge contains a white Death's Head in a black shroud. The badge refers to the squadron's Ghost designation which was earned through its night bombing operations, as 'Hitler's Haunters' and the death and destruction which it inflicted upon the enemy.

== No. 428 Bomber Squadron RCAF ==
No. 428 Squadron RCAF was the ninth long-range heavy bomber Article XV squadron formed overseas during the Second World War at RAF Dalton in Yorkshire, England on November 7, 1942. The squadron was initially assigned to No. 4 Group RAF. With the creation of No. 6 Group RCAF, the squadron was reallocated on January 1, 1943, operating with it until April 25, 1945.

The squadron was first equipped with Vickers Wellingtons (Mk III and Mk X), and its first operational mission was on January 26–27, 1943, when five Wellingtons bombed the U-Boat base at Lorient in Brittany, on the Bay of Biscay. In the early part of June 1943, the squadron moved to RAF Middleton St. George where it remained for the remainder of the war. Around this time the squadron was converted to Handley Page Halifaxes (Mk Vs, and later supplemented by Mk II Series IIA).

In January 1944, Halifax bombers from No. 428 Squadron participated in the first high-level mining raid "Gardening", when mines were dropped by parachute from 15,000 feet (4,570 m) over Brest on 4/5 Jan and Saint-Nazaire on 6/7 Jan 1945. The squadron flew its last sortie with the Halifax on June 12, 1944, then converting to the Canadian-built Avro Lancaster (B. Mark X), the first sortie taking place on June 14, 1944.

For the final phase of the air campaign against Germany, the squadron took part in day and night raids, with its last operational sortie taking place on April 25, 1945, when 15 Lancasters bombed anti-aircraft gun batteries defending the mouth of the Weser, on the Frisian Island of Wangerooge. No. 428 Squadron RCAF remained in service in the United Kingdom until the end of May 1945.

By the middle of June the squadron had moved to RCAF Station Yarmouth in Nova Scotia, where it was disbanded on September 5, 1945. 428 Squadron was "sponsored" by the Imperial Order Daughters of the Empire, a Canadian national women's charitable organization based in Toronto.

=== Aircraft operated ===
Aircraft	Period of service	Representative serial
Vickers Wellington Mk III	November 1942 – May 1943	ZI719 (NA – P)
Vickers Wellington Mk X	December 1942 – June 1943	HL864 (NA – D)
Handley Page Halifax Mk B.V	June 1943 – January 1944	DK237 (NA – L)
Handley Page Halifax Mk B.II	November 1943 – June 1944	JN955 (NA – L)
Avro Lancaster Mk B.X	June 1944 – September 1945	KB763 (NA – S)

=== Officers commanding and squadron bases ===
The eight officers commanding (OCs) of 428 Squadron were: W/C A. Earle (7 November 1942 – 20 February 1943), W/C D. Smith (21 February 1943 – 14 September 1943, POW), W/C W. Suggitt (15 September 1943 – 30 October 1943), W/C D. French (31 October 1943 – 8 May 1944), W/C W. McLeish (9 May 1944 – 7 August 1944), W/C A. Hull (8 August 1944 – 1 January 1945), W/C M. Gall (2 January 1945 – 2 June 1945), and W/C C.M. Black (26 July – 5 September 1945). Gall was in charge of returning the squadron to Canada, while Black was tasked with preparing the squadron for employment against Japan.

Squadron Base RAF	RCAF Designation	Date
RAF Dalton	No 61 Base	November 1942 – May 1943
RAF Dishforth	No 61 Base	May 1943
RAF Middleton St. George	No 64 Base	June 1943 – May 1945
RCAF Station Yarmouth	No. 661 Wing	May 1945 – 5 September 1945

The first OC, Wing Commander Alfred Earle, the son of Henry Henwood Earle and Mary Winifred Rawle, was born on 11 Dec 1907, at Shebbear, in North Devon. At fifteen, leaving Shebbear College, he entered the RAF Aircraft Apprentice Scheme, as an RAF Halton Apprentice (11th Entry). Earle was selected for General Duties (Pilot) Branch commissioning in 1925, then attending RAF (Cadet) College Cranwell, before gaining his permanent commission as a pilot officer in 1929. Coming to specialize in photographic work, having served as Deputy Chief Instructor at the RAF School of Photography (South Farnborough) and as Command Photographic Officer, HQ RAF Far East Command, from February 1938, he was promoted to squadron leader in July 1938. Entering RAF Staff College, Andover, in January 1939, on graduation, he was appointed Command Photographic Officer, HQ Training Command, and then Officer Commanding No. 2 Photographic School (Blackpool). Promoted to wing commander (temporary) in December 1940, he was assigned to the Air Staff, Directorate of Plans, in February 1941.

On 7 Nov 1942, he assumed command of No 428 (RCAF) Squadron, standing up the squadron in No. 4 Group. As the OC, it was noted that "Wing Commander Earle was a grand chap, one who can genuinely be called, 'One of Nature's Gentlemen'. He was well liked by the Canadians and sadly missed when he left on promotion to group captain in February 1943. He flew two operations from Dalton, occupying the astro-dome. He had previously been flying Fairey Gordons in the Middle East (Iraq), and found the Wellington difficult, partly due to his eyesight not liking the English skies, and partly as he was not a tall man." After only three months, he left 428 Bomber Squadron (RCAF) as an acting group captain on 7 Feb 1943, when he was assigned as the station commander of RAF Ridgewell and then RAF West Wickham, late in 1943, then as a temporary group captain. He ended the war as Air Officer Commanding No. 300 Group RAF (RAF Transport Command) in Australia.

=== Battle honours: World War Two ===
During the Second World War, No. 428 Squadron RCAF was awarded several battle honours. These honours are certified by the Canadian Air Force.

Award	Additional Info
English Channel and North Sea 1943–1944	For ship attack, anti-submarine and mining operations over the English Channel and North Sea from the outbreak of war to VE Day
Baltic 1944	For operations against targets in Germany, Italy and Enemy-Occupied Europe
Fortress Europe 1943–1944	For operations by aircraft based in the British Isles against targets in Germany, Italy and Enemy-Occupied Europe, from the Fall of France to the Invasion of Normandy
France and Germany 1944–1945	For operations over France, Belgium, the Netherlands and Germany during the Liberation of North-West Europe and the advance into the enemy's homeland, from the start of air action preparatory to the Invasion of France in April 1944 to VE Day on 8 May 1945
Biscay Ports 1943–1944	For operations over the Bay of Biscay Ports from the Fall of France to VE Day
Ruhr 1943–1945	For bombardment of the Ruhr Area by aircraft of Bomber Command
Berlin 1943–1944	For bombardment of Berlin by aircraft of Bomber Command
Normandy 1944	For operations supporting the Allied landings in Normandy, the establishment of the lodgement area and the subsequent breakthrough from June to August 1944
German Ports 1943–1945	For bombardment of the German Ports by aircraft of Bomber and Coastal Commands
Biscay 1940–1945	For operations over the Bay of Biscay by aircraft of Bomber Command loaned to Coastal Command between the Fall of France on 25 June 1940 to VE Day on 8 May 1945
Rhine	For operations in support of the Battle for the Rhine Crossing from 8 February 1945 to 24 March 1945

=== Disbandment: September 1945 ===
By late 1944, the RCAF Overseas leadership became committed to provisional planning of a (very) long-range heavy bomber force being considered for a post-Europe deployment, to the Far East. Code-named 'Tiger Force' it was to operate from the Okinawa Islands, and in its final design assemble two groups, each of eight RAF and RCAF squadrons, to include No. 428 Squadron. Formation orders issued, the designated Canadian squadrons were to re-equip with newer Avro Lancaster Mk. Xs, of the RAF owned FM and KB series. When released from No.6 Group, 428 Squadron journeyed via Lajes, on Terceira Island, The Azores, to Gander, Newfoundland and onto Yarmouth, Nova Scotia, making a singular mark on the way. Of 165 Tiger Force Lancasters dispatched, 164 made the crossing, whereas on June 4, 1945, Lancaster KB764 No. 428 Squadron approaching Lagens, having previously lost its port outer engine and then its port inner engine, power completely asymmetric, crashed 3 km (1.9 mi) out to sea. "No trouble was experienced in leaving the aircraft", wrote Flight Lieutenant Elihu Paul Acree.

Tiger Force's No. 6 Group, RCAF / No. 661 (Heavy Bomber) Wing (10 July 1945), to be commanded by Wing Commander F.R. Sharp, DFC, was to form at RCAF Station Yarmouth in Nova Scotia with No. 419 and No. 428 Squadrons. Beginning reorganization and training on 10 August 1945 'Ghost' Squadron was to be ready for deployment on 1 January 1946, manned with ‘volunteering' personnel from within No. 6 Bomber Group. The 'volunteers' would be sought amongst those who had not served overseas, those who had not yet completed their tours, in sorties or hours and actually elected to participate. Their Mk. Xs were to be modified, removing the mid-upper turret and fitting huge "saddle tanks" on top of the fuselage, painted and crewed for an initial six week training programme flying from Yarmouth. With the bombing of Hiroshima and Nagasaki (06/9 August), and Japan's formal surrender on 2 September, No. 428 Squadron received disbandment orders on 5 September 1945.

== 428 All-Weather (Fighter) Squadron ==
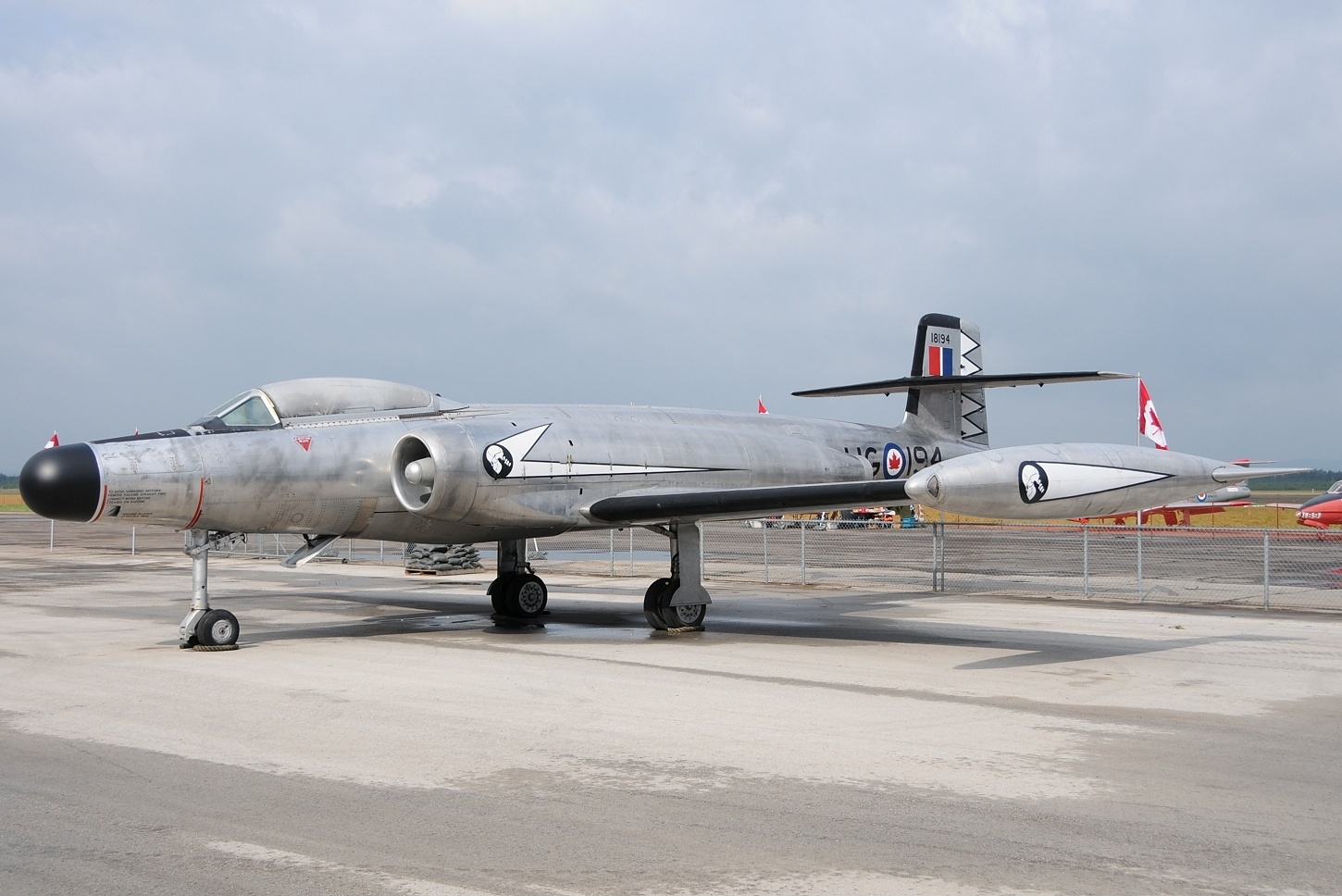
An Avro CF-100 Canuck Mk4A from 428 Ghost Squadron at CFB Borden in 1993

As the fifth Avro Canada CF-100 Canuck equipped squadron, on June 21, 1954, the squadron was re-activated at RCAF Station Uplands as 428 All-Weather (Fighter) Squadron, stood up as an interceptor squadron, capable of operating both day and night. 428 All-Weather (Fighter) Squadron was re-activated, as one of nine Canadian based RCAF squadrons, to be operating under the new RCAF Air Defense Command, protecting North American airspace from Soviet intruders and long range bombers. The squadron received eighteen CF-100s, of which a prototype of its first aircraft, the Mark IV, had flown on 11 October 1952. It received its first Mk-4As in June 1954 (i.e. Tail No. 18211/18223), seeing an engine boost in the MK-4Bs it began to receive in February 1955 (i.e. Tail No. 18331/18356) and the big change with the Mk-5s (i.e. Tail No. 18464/18542) it began to receive in March 1956 (losing its guns).

The Mk4 embodied a structural redesign, with the installation of 6,300 lb thrust Orenda 9 engines, fire control changes with an updated Hughes AN/APG-40 nose-mounted radar, and an armament reconfiguration. This modification brought the addition of twin wing-tip pods, each containing twenty-nine 2.75-in ‘Mighty Mouse’ unguided rockets, while retaining its eight electrically feed-boosted Colt AN/M3 Browning .50 calibre machine-guns. The Mk4 came with an interchangeable 'ventral pack' to arm with an additional forty-eight 2.75-in 'Mighty Mouse' rockets, replacing the pack (tray) containing the machine-guns. The Squadron's first aircraft became designated as Mk 4As with the introduction of the Mk 4B sub-type having 'Orenda 11' turbojet engines. As 428 Squadron took on charge their Mk 4Bs, some were subsequently moved to 1 Air Division squadrons.

=== Ottawa, Ontario, fighter squadron ===
The RCAF had established a presence at the Uplands (Ottawa) Airport, in August 1940, under the British Commonwealth Air Training Plan, as No. 2 Service Flying Training School began operations. With the war ending, No.2 SFTS closed on 14 April 1945, the Station became home to Headquarters RCAF Maintenance Command, and when Maintenance Command relocated, in 1947, RCAF association with the site ceased. RCAF flying activities resumed at Uplands, with the re-activation of several WW2 fighter squadrons, they designated again for service in Europe. No.439 Squadron was first re-formed in September 1951, at Uplands, as was No.416 Squadron, in September 1952, both departing for in Europe in 1953, they flying the F86 Sabre.

In 1954, standing up a 'new Mark IV' fighter squadron, progressing from an initial operating capability, having received its complement of aircrew, to a full operational capability required a change to a Mark III flying and training model. First, flying practices to confirm that pilot/airborne interceptor integration was retained from No.3 OTU training, and learning the changes in Airborne Interception (AI) and Ground-Controlled Interception (GCI) tactics. The 'Guns Only' Conventional Pursuit Interception (flying Mark IIIs) was replaced with the Lead Collision Course (LCC) Attack (with 2.75-in Folding-Fin Aerial Rockets). The second stage began with a full night flying program, now with lights out interceptions (with fewer visual clues) and 'Bumping Heads'. The third stage of training saw gunnery practice at an air-to-ground range, both the .50 calibre guns and Mighty Mouse rockets at ranges near Winchester, south of Ottawa or Lac St. Pierre, near Sorel, Quebec. Air to Air (Towed) gunnery was practised on a range 'over' Lake Ontario, near RCAF Station Trenton.

Having reached 'FOC' the challenge to an AW(F) Squadron was maintaining 'operational effectiveness' with the constant of change in crews and aircraft. Individual crews, on two week rotations, got evaluated at 'Rocket Camps' run at the RCAF Weapons Practice Unit (WPU) at RCAF Station Cold Lake, and their best tested at the Annual WPU 'Rocket Meet' – 428 AW(F) winning the MacBrien Trophy (Team Effort) in 1958. Local, Regional and Continental Exercises in COCKED PISTOL, CRACKER JACK and SKYSHIELD tested the squadron, its Wing and its ADDC Sector. A prevalent CGI exercise involved simulated combat scrambles against the USAF Boeing B-47 Stratojet, it then being the backbone of the USAF Strategic Air Command, in their 'Returning to Base', everyone wanting an MA – Mission Accomplished and not the MI – Mission Incomplete designation.

As an RCAF Air Defence Command Fighter Squadron, 428 AW(F) was allocated to No.3 ADCC Operational Sector, its Operational Control Centre at RCAF Station Edgar ON. No.3 ADCC coordinated the operations of No. 31 Aircraft Control & Warning Squadron (also at RCAF Station Edgar), No. 32 AC&W Squadron at RCAF Station Foymount ON, No. 33 AC&W Sqn at RCAF Station Falconbridge ON, No. 34 AC&W Sqn at RCAF Station Senneterre QC, and 912 Squadron (USAF) at RCAF Station Ramore ON. Responsive to the Sector Commander, the Fighter Control Operators at No.3 ADCC provided the squadron's 'Ground-Controlled Interception' direction, through the signing of the NORAD Agreement in 1958.

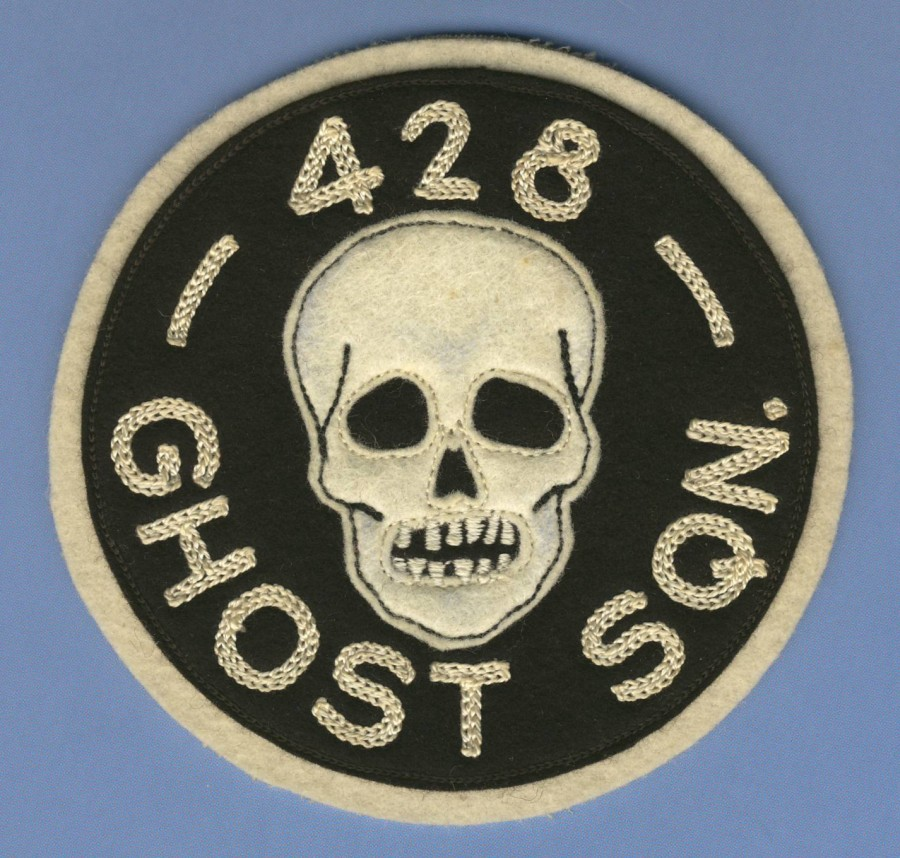
RCAF 428 Ghost Squadron flight suit patch, made by Crest Craft pre 1956. This is the first issue of two similar versions.

=== Accidents and losses ===
Given the serious nature of the Cold War, everything that flew into the Canadian Northern Air Defence Region had to be detected and identified within two minutes by RCAF or USAF Aircraft Control & Warning Squadron personnel. If an aircraft was unknown at two minutes, fighters were scrambled to intercept, to find out why the aircraft could not be identified, to force it to land, or to shoot it down. Receiving interception notification from No.3 ADCC at RCAF Stn Edgar, 428 AW(F) fighters, on Alert Status, were airborne within five minutes, when under reduced status 15 minutes, and one hour was permitted. To meet the standard, and when on exercise, squadron aircraft with alert crews were positioned fuelled and armed, 24 hours a day/seven days a week, in special Quick Reaction Alert hangars.

In maintaining its operational readiness, 428 AW(F), Call Sign: Davenport, Squadron Code: HG, saw its share of pilot/navigator loss over its short seven year CF-100 history. The squadron ably equipped with a Canadian two-seat fighter, designed with two powerful engines and an advanced radar and fire control system, was able to fly in all-weather and night conditions, a role considered less glamorous than the task assigned to 'day' fighters. Flying a first rate aircraft, with a good range and payload carrying ability, operating in its all-weather interceptor role, it was second-to-none. Compared to the American Northrop F-89 Scorpion, the CF-100 Canuck was considered to be superior in all aspects. The squadron lost six aircrew during flying operations in 1956 and 1960.

Pilot	CF-100 Canuck	Date	Details
Stuart Allan Marshall	Mark V 18575	19 May 1956	Starboard wing separated during high-speed low-level pass during air show at Kinross AFB, Michigan
John Peter Nestoruk	Mark V Cold Lake AB	17 October 1956	RCAF Service No. 37742 Age 26 Duncan, British Columbia
Bertram Gordon Paul Leon	Mark V 18571	7 December 1960	Collided at night with HG 610 while practising lights out interceptions at night, near Val-d'Or, Quebec
John Edward McCarthy	Mark V 18571	7 December 1960	Collided at night with HG 610 while practising lights out interceptions at night, near Val-d'Or, Quebec
J. Meryle Lorne McLean	Mark V 18610	7 December 1960	Collided at night with HG 571 while practising lights out interceptions at night, near Val-d'Or, Quebec
John Stanley Reid	Mark V 18610	7 December 1960	Collided at night with HG 571 while practising lights out interceptions at night, near Val-d'Or, Quebec

=== 428 AW(F): the commanding officers ===
In its short history there were three Commanding Officers of 428 AW(F) Squadron W/C E.W.Smith DSO from 04.01.1955 to 26.04.1957, S/L P.F. Greenway from 24.04.1957 to 23.04.1959 and W/C M.F. Doyle from 24.04.1959 to 01.06.1961, who would go on to command 410 AW(F) Squadron and later 1 Cdn Air Group in 1970.

W/C E.W. Smith DSO was appointed Officer Commanding No.428 All-Weather (Fighter) Squadron on 4 January 1955 and served in that post until 26 April 1957, having previously made a transition from heavy bombers and strategic transport aircraft, to jet fighters. Born in Metis Beach QC, on 11 November 1920, he joined the RCAF on 20 July 1940, selected for pilot training, he earned his wings in February 1941 and went overseas in March 1941. He completed two operational tours, first with No.102 (Ceylon) Squadron RAF, and a second with No.424 (Tiger) Squadron RCAF.

Remaining in the postwar RCAF, he first served with the RCAF Test and Evaluation (Establishment), where he flew the original "Rockcliffe Ice Wagon" (RY-3 Liberator) and commanded the RCAF Hadrian Glider Detachment with Operation MUSKOX – the first Canadian to pilot a glider above the Arctic Circle. As the first RCAF Exchange Officer to serve in USAF Air Transport Command, he captained both a 20 and 27 mission C-54 Skymaster deployment in the Berlin Airlift, and, later with the USAF, captained both the morning B-17 (Flying Fortress) Drone Test Flight and the evening B-17 Mother (Drone), on May 14, 1948, supporting 'Operation Sandstone' – Test Three 'Zebra' at the Pacific Proving Grounds, at Eniwetok-Atoll.

In January 1950, he captained the No. 412 (Composite) Squadron C-5 Canadair North Star (DC-4 M1 7518) making the first RCAF round-the-world flight. Covering 43,000 kilometres, it transported the Secretary of State for External Affairs, Lester B. Pearson, and the governor-general, Field Marshal Viscount Alexander, to the Commonwealth Conference of Foreign Ministers, held in Colombo, Ceylon (now Sri Lanka), from 9–14 January 1950. After commanding 428 AW(F) Squadron, he took up command of the relocated No.3 All-Weather (Fighter) Operational Training Unit then at RCAF Station Cold Lake.

=== Disbandment: first to go ===
With the Cold War had come a perceived threat, to Canada, in the Soviet Air Force (VVS) piston- engine bomber, the Tupolev Tu-4 Bull, and its unrefuelled range of 5,400 km. Introduced in 1947, eight hundred and forty-seven Tu-4s being built, they were withdrawn from operational service in the 1960s. In Canada to counter this danger, the Avro CF-100 Canuck was designed (1946–50), built and delivered (1953–1957) to nine regular fighter squadrons, and as the Soviet VVS threat changed the Canadian requirement would change. By the late 1950s, the RCAF leadership was anxious to see re-equipping of its Canadian CF-100 squadrons (operating 162 aircraft) with the new Avro Canada CF-105 Arrow. This was to deal with new threats in the Tupolev Tu-16 Badger A (1954) a jet bomber and the Tupolev Tu-95 Bear (1956) a turboprop bomber, it with an operating range of 15,000 km.

Assuming re-equipping, with a reduced number of aircraft (100) through the CF-105 Arrow program, the RCAF scheduled the phasing out of its older CF 100 squadrons, less those stationed in Europe. Though, designated first to go 425 'Alouette' Squadron (St Hubert) would only be deactivated, and so 428 'Ghost' Squadron was disbanded on 31 May 1961. As the first designated CF-100 squadron to be withdrawn without re-equipping, having no WW2 fighter heritage, it was not identified to receive the new CF-105 or the used American F-101s. As a precursor to all CF-100 operational 'fighter' flying ending in December 1962, there would be no Canadian CF-105s (Feb 1959) and the alternative American F-101B Voodoo (Jul 1961) program (acquiring only 56 operational aircraft) would see five all-weather interceptor squadrons, replace the nine all-weather fighter squadrons. They were later reduced to three in 1964.

=== Reactivation ===
In March 2026, 428 Squadron was reactivated as 428 Remotely Piloted Aircraft Systems Squadron (428 RPAS Sqn). The squadron was established as a Regular Force unit of the Royal Canadian Air Force and assigned to 14 Wing Greenwood. The reactivation took effect on 27 March 2026.
