= RAF Dishforth =

Former Royal Air Force base in Yorkshire, England

RAF Dishforth
- Dishforth, North Yorkshire in England
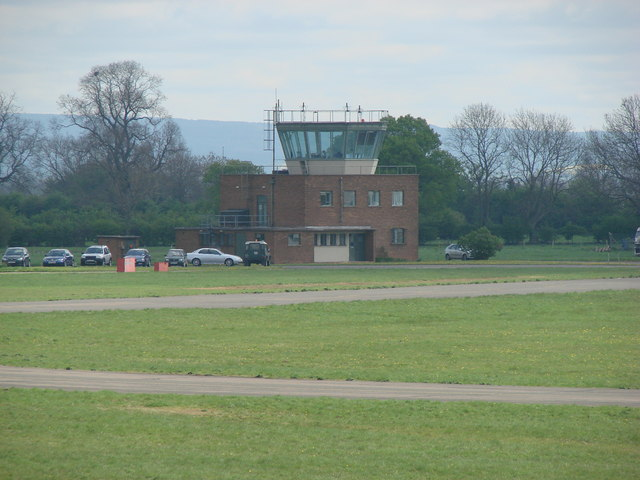
- The air traffic control at former RAF Dishforth in 2007.

Site information
- Type: Royal Air Force station Parent station 1936-43; 61 Base Substation 1943-44; 76 Base Substation
- Code: DH
- Owner: Ministry of Defence
- Operator: Royal Air Force (1936–1943 and 1945–1992); Royal Canadian Air Force (1943–1945)
- Controlled by: RAF Bomber Command * No. 4 Group RAF * No. 6 Group RCAF
- Condition: Closed

Location
- Shown within North Yorkshire RAF Dishforth (the United Kingdom)
- Coordinates: 54°08′14″N 001°25′13″W
- Grid reference: SE380720
- Area: 215 hectares

Site history
- Built: 1935/36
- In use: September 1936 – 1992
- Fate: Transferred to the British Army's Army Air Corps and became Dishforth Airfield.
- Battles/wars: European theatre of World War II; Cold War

Garrison information
- Past commanders: Tim Piper; Desmond J. Scott

Airfield information
- Identifiers: ICAO: EGXD, WMO: 03261
- Elevation: 36 metres (118 ft) AMSL
Runways
Direction	Length and surface
10/28	1,362 metres (4,469 ft) Asphalt
15/33	1,858 metres (6,096 ft) Asphalt

Royal Air Force Dishforth or more simply RAF Dishforth is a former Royal Air Force station near Thirsk in North Yorkshire, England. Opened in 1936, the base was used as a bomber airfield during the Second World War with both British and Canadian squadrons flying missions from the airfield. After the war, the base was used by various squadrons and training units before being disposed of in 1992 and handed over to the Army Air Corps, becoming Dishforth Airfield.

== History ==
The site at Dishforth was elected during the expansion period of the Royal Air Force in the 1930s. Named after the village of Dishforth, just to the north of the main runway, the base was opened in September 1936. Just like RAF Leeming further north, the airfield was adjacent to the Great North Road (now the A1(M)), and even extended over the road for some of its dispersal areas in the late 1930s. Five C-type hangars were built at the south-east boundary of the airfield, with the technical areas beyond the hangars. The creation of hardstanding hangarage, and brick-built accommodation blocks and messes, made Dishforth a preferred posting over the wartime built airbases which operated mainly from Nissen huts (such as Dalton, Tholthorpe, and Wombleton).

The first squadrons to arrive were No. 10 Sqn in January 1937, who immediately transferred from Handley Page Heyford aircraft to Armstrong Whitworth Whitley Mk 1 aircraft, and in February, No. 78 Sqn arrived, also with Heyfords, and were re-equipped with Whitleys in July of that same year. It was the dispersals across the A1 road that the Whitleys of No. 78 Sqn were stored, with barriers having to be placed across the carriageway to allow the aircraft to move back and forth.

When the Second World War started, No. 10 Sqn were engaged in leaflet dropping over Europe (known as Nickel raids, or Nickelling), whilst No. 78 Sqn in the pre-war period had been used to assimilate new crews fresh from training. At this time, the base was under the command of No. 4 Group, and whilst some bombing raids did take place, the squadrons were mostly engaged in leaflet dropping, including one raid over Berlin which was a 1,000-mile (1,600 km) round trip. In December 1939, No. 78 Squadron were sent to Linton-on-Ouse, and No. 51 Sqn moved in from Linton. Both No. 10 and No. 78 Sqns were used on bombing raids in the early part of 1940 with sorties over Norway and over the Ruhr.

In July 1940, No. 10 Sqn were transferred to RAF Leeming when it was opened, with an administrative detachment from No. 78 Sqn sent to Leeming as well to get the base up and running. Dishforth was used by several squadrons from RAF Leeming during early 1941 for '"bombing-up purposes", as the airfield at Leeming was in the process of being concreted. Later in 1940, No. 78 Sqn returned from Leeming, with No. 10 Sqn being posted out of Dishforth for Leeming, leaving No. 51 and No. 78 Sqns at Dishforth.

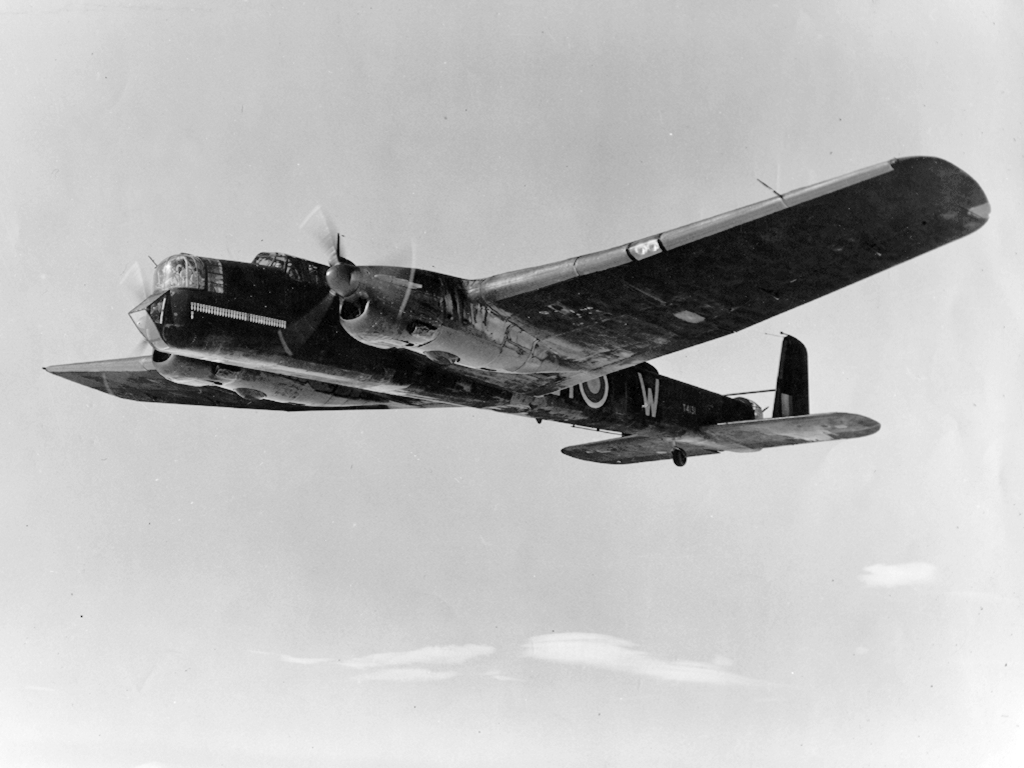
Whitley V 78 Sqn in flight c1940

In February 1941, Whitleys from both squadrons took part in Operation Colossus, a commando raid on aqueducts in southern Italy. The RAF at that time did not have any suitable aircraft to transport troops over such a long-distance, however, the range of the Whitleys, and their ventral (side) gun turret, which was easily adapted into a jumping position for troops, made it ideal for the task. No. 12 (Blind Approach Training) Flight (later to become No. 1512 (Beam Approach Training) Flight) was formed at Dishforth in September 1941, flying Airspeed Oxfords.

In April 1941, No. 78 Sqn was posted to RAF Middleton St George, leaving No. 51 Sqn as the only occupant. In the almost three-year tour that 51 Sqn performed at Dishforth, they flew 1,806 sorties, and lost 50 aircraft (an attrition rate of 2.8%). In early 1942, the Whitleys of 51 Sqn took part in raid on a radar installation in Bruneval, and in Operation Chariot, the raid on St. Nazaire. In June 1942, the first of the Royal Canadian Air Force squadrons, No. 425 (Alouette), was formed with Vickers Wellington aircraft. The squadron set about training and carried out their first raid on the night of the 5 and 6 October. In the same month as No. 425 were undertaking their first operational missions, No. 426 (Thunderbird) Squadron was formed up at Dishforth, becoming operational in January 1943.

In January 1943, Dishforth, along with ten other RAF airfields, was handed over from the RAF to the Royal Canadian Air Force (No. 4 Group RAF to No. 6 Group RCAF. Operations were concentrated at Leeming, Linton-on-Ouse and Middleton St George, with substations and the training bases being Topcliffe, Wombleton, Dalton and Dishforth, which had No. 1664 Heavy Conversion Unit. Both Canadian squadrons moved out of Dishforth in 1943; 425 in May and 426 in June respectively, which allowed for the runway to be upgraded. The RCAF kept Dishforth as the training arm for its bomber squadrons and when the upgrade was complete in November 1943, No. 1664 HCU (Heavy Conversion Unit) was allocated to the base.

In November 1944, the base was transferred into No. 7 Group, which had a responsibility for all the HCU stations. With hostilities in Europe at an end, the base was transferred again to RAF Transport Command, and continued with its training role. In November 1945, No. 1332 (Transport) Heavy Conversion Unit arrived from RAF Riccall, taking over training for long-haul transport routes and taking the aircraft form the existing HCUs at Dishforth.

=== Post war ===
Dishforth continued in the training role for transport aircraft after the war, and in 1956, No. 215 Sqn reformed at Dishforth with Scottish Aviation Pioneer aircraft, later disbanding at Dishforth in September 1958 to become No. 230 Sqn. In 1954, the base was initially approved for use in the PGM-17 Thor missile programme, but it never became one of the operational stations. In early 1962, No. 242 OCU was moved to Thorney Island and the base was put under a care and maintenance programme. Various aircraft from Leeming and Linton-on-Ouse used the airfield as a Relief Landing Ground (RLG), and the buildings were converted for use by the local police forces.

=== Police college ===
It had the Dishforth Police Training Centre, also known as Dishforth Police College from the early 1960s.

300 police personnel a year trained on 14-week courses. In December 1979, it was looking at possible closure, or to be privatised in the early 1980s, or again closure in 1985. In August 1985 it was decided to close the site, being closed by 1986.

During the 1985 miners' strike, six miners retrained as police, at the college. It took police personnel north of Nottinghamshire.

=== Army Air Corps ===
In 1992, the base was handed over to the Army Air Corps as Dishforth Airfield.

== Badge and motto ==
The station badge features a white pack horse representing the transport nature of the base (post World War II), the horse is modelled on the White Horse of Kilburn, a nearby geographical feature in the Hambleton Hills. The station motto was Par Oneri (Latin: Equal to the task).

== Incidents ==
- 13 September 1955—Hastings TG584 lost control attempting to overshoot at RAF Dishforth and crashed; five died.

== Notable personnel ==
- Percy Charles Pickard, commanding officer of No. 51 Sqn during 1942
- Tim Piper
- Desmond J. Scott, post-war commanding officer of RAF Dishforth
- James Brian Tait, commanded the air transport portion of Operation Colossus from RAF Dishforth

== Based units ==
Squadron/Unit	Dates	Posted from	Posted to	Notes	Ref
No. 4 Group Practice Flight	July – September 1937				
No. 6 Group Communication Flight	December 1942 – July 1945			Reformed and disbanded at Dishforth	
No. 10 Sqn	January 1937 – July 1940	RAF Boscombe Down	RAF Leeming		
No. 12 (BAT) Flight	September – October 1941			Formed and disbanded at Dishforth	
No. 30 Sqn	April 1953 – November 1959	RAF Benson	RAF Eastleigh		
No. 47 Sqn	September 1948 – August 1949	RAF Fairford	RAF Topcliffe		
No. 51 Sqn	December 1939 – October 1942	RAF Linton-on-Ouse	RAF Snaith		
No. 78 Sqn	February 1937 – December 1939	RAF Boscombe Down	RAF Linton-on-Ouse		
No. 78 Sqn	July 1940 – April 1941	RAF Linton-on-Ouse	RAF Middleton St George		
No. 215 Sqn	April 1954 – September 1958			Reformed and disbanded at Dishforth (to become No. 230 Sqn)	
No. 230 Sqn	September 1958 – November 1958		RAF Nicosia	Formed at Dishforth	
No. 242 Operational Conversion Unit	April 1951 – January 1962		RAF Thorney Island	Formed at Dishforth by merging No. 240 and 241 OCUs	
No. 297 Sqn	November 1948 – August 1949	RAF Fairford	RAF Topcliffe		
No. 425 Squadron	June 1942 – May 1943		Telergma (North Africa)	Formed at Dishforth	
No. 426 Squadron	October 1942 – June 1943		RAF Linton-on-Ouse	Formed at Dishforth	
No. 1332 (Transport) Heavy Conversion Unit	November 1945 – January 1948	RAF Riccall		Disbanded at Dishforth to form No. 241 OCU	
No. 1512 (BAT) Flight	October 1941 – February 1942		RAF Banff	Formed at Dishforth from No. 12 (BAT) Flight	
No. 1659 Conversion Unit	July 1944				
No. 1664 Heavy Conversion Unit	December 1943 – April 1955	RAF Croft		Disbanded at Dishforth	
