= RAF Tholthorpe =

Royal Air Force base in Yorkshire, England

RAF Tholthorpe
- Easingwold, North Yorkshire in England
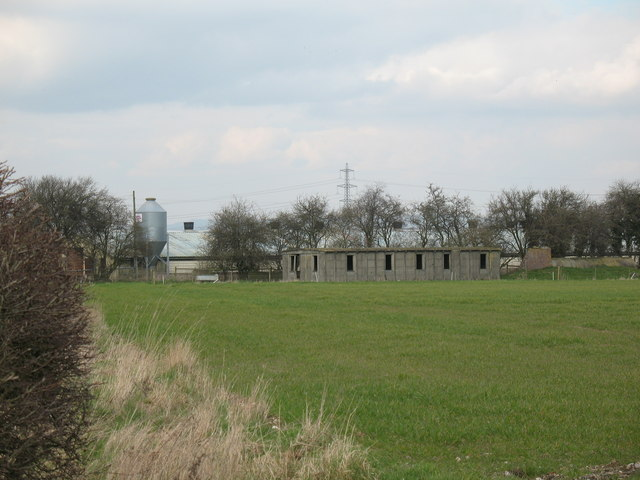
- Old huts at the site of RAF Tholthorpe

Site information
- Type: Royal Air Force satellite station
- Owner: Air Ministry
- Operator: Royal Air Force; Royal Canadian Air Force
- Controlled by: RAF Bomber Command

Location
- Shown within North Yorkshire RAF Tholthorpe (the United Kingdom)
- Coordinates: 54°06′15″N 001°15′30″W

Site history
- Built: 1940
- In use: 1940 - 1945
- Battles/wars: European theatre of World War II

Airfield information
Runways
| Direction | Length and surface |
|---|---|
| 06/24 | Concrete |
| 10/28 | Concrete |
| 16/34 | Concrete |

Royal Air Force Tholthorpe' or more simply RAF Tholthorpe is a former Royal Air Force satellite station located near Easingwold, North Yorkshire, England. It was operational during the Second World War; having been opened during the 1930s as a grass airfield. It was controlled by RAF Bomber Command, as a sub-station of RAF Linton-on-Ouse.

== History ==
From August 1940 to December 1940, Tholthorpe was a landing field for Armstrong Whitworth Whitley bombers of No. 58 Squadron RAF and No. 51 Squadron RAF based at Linton.

From January 1941 to June 1943, Tholthorpe underwent maintenance to upgrade to Class A standards, with three intersecting concrete runways designated main 10-28 at 2,000 yards, 06-24 at 1,430 yards and 16-34 at 1,400 yards.

Tholthorpe was assigned to No. 6 Group RCAF in June 1943. RCAF squadrons stationed here included No. 434 Squadron "Bluenose", 431 Squadron "Iroquois", 420 Squadron "Snowy Owl", and 425 Squadron "Alouette".

No. 434 Squadron, flying Halifax bombers, was formed and headquartered at Tholthorpe airfield from June 1943 until the squadron was moved to Croft. In July 1943, 431 Squadron moved to Tholthorpe airfield from Burn. It was later moved to Croft airfield as well. Not only were the operational squadrons quartered here, also their service echelons, -respectively Nos. 9431 and 9434 Service Echelon- which were formed from the ground crew of nos. 431 and 434 Squadron on 3 November 1943 and who moved with their squadrons on to Croft in December 1943.

In December 1943 No. 420 and No. 425 Squadrons (together with their service echelons, nos. 9420 and 9425 Service Echelon) were moved to Tholthorpe airfield from Dalton and Dishforth respectively. These squadrons had returned from service with Vickers Wellingtons in North Africa, and it took them several weeks to work up on the newly acquired Halifax bombers. They were therefore unable to fly their first raids from Tholthorpe until mid-February 1944. No. 420 Squadron flew 160 operations from Tholthorpe airfield and lost 25 Halifaxes. No. 425 Squadron flew 162 operations from Tholthorpe airfield and lost 28 Halifaxes. In all, 119 Halifax bombers were lost from Tholthorpe. In April and May 1945 Nos. 420 and 425 Squadron converted to Avro Lancasters, which they took with them when they left for RCAF Debert, Nova Scotia, Canada in June 1945.

The station closed in June 1945.

== Operational units and aircraft ==
data from
| Unit | From | To | Aircraft | Version |
|---|---|---|---|---|
| No. 420 Squadron RCAF | 12 December 1943 | 12 June 1945 | Handley Page Halifax; Avro Lancaster | Mk.III (1943–1945); Mk.X (1945) |
| No. 425 Squadron RCAF | 12 December 1943 | 13 June 1945 | Handley Page Halifax; Avro Lancaster | Mk.III (1943–1945); Mk.X (1945) |
| No. 431 Squadron RCAF | 15 July 1943 | 10 December 1943 | Handley Page Halifax | Mk.V |
| No. 434 Squadron RCAF | 13 June 1943 | 11 December 1943 | Handley Page Halifax | Mk.V |

== Postwar ==
In the 1980s the airfield was used for a short time for private flying. Within a decade, most of the buildings were abandoned and the runways became farm roads. The control tower has been turned into a family residence.

A monument of Canadian granite, and the avenue of oaks and maples between this village and the airfield, honour the fallen airmen who served in the Royal Canadian Air Force squadrons and the citizens of the community who supported them.

== See also ==
- List of former Royal Air Force stations
