= No. 6 Group RCAF =

Royal Canadian Air Force operations group (1942–1945)

- Active: 25 October 1942 – 31 August 1945
- Country: Canada
- Branch: Royal Canadian Air Force
- Role: Strategic and tactical bombing
- Size: 14 squadrons at peak strength
- Part of: RAF Bomber Command
- Garrison/HQ: Allerton Park, Yorkshire
- Mottos: Latin: Sollertia et ingenium ("Initiative and skill")

Commanders
- Notable commanders: Air Vice-Marshal G.E. Brookes, Air Vice-Marshal C.M. McEwen

Insignia
- Group badge heraldry: A maple leaf superimposed on a York rose

Aircraft flown
- Bomber: Vickers Wellington; Short Stirling; Handley Page Halifax; Avro Lancaster
- Trainer: British Aircraft Eagle; Foster Wikner Wicko; Airspeed Oxford

No. 6 Group RCAF was a group of Royal Canadian Air Force (RCAF) heavy bomber squadrons in Europe during the Second World War, between 1942 and 1945. The group operated out of airfields in Yorkshire, England.

== History ==
No. 6 Group was a Royal Canadian Air Force formation, differing from the previous No. 6 Group RAF. Air Commodore Charles Rumney Samson led No. 6 Group from 1924 to 1926. In 1936, No. 1 (Air Defence) Group RAF, a group of auxiliary bomber squadrons formed in 1926, was renamed No. 6 (Auxiliary) Group. No. 6 (Auxiliary) Group was renamed No. 6 (Bomber) Group on 1 January 1939. No. 6 (Bomber) Group initially was an operational bomber group. The first bombing attack on the naval base at Wilhelmshaven was by Nos. 107 and 110 Squadrons from No. 6 (Bomber) Group RAF with Bristol Blenheim bombers on 4 September 1939. In the spring of 1940, it became dedicated to controlling Bomber Command Operational Training Units providing three months training to new bomber crews and occasionally adding bombers to bomber streams. No. 6 (Bomber) Group RAF was renamed No. 91 (Bomber) Group RAF on 11 May 1942 and the 6 Group designation was transferred to the RCAF on 25 October 1942.

No. 6 Group RCAF was made up of Article XV squadrons: RCAF units formed under the British Commonwealth Air Training Plan, for service with British operational formations; hence No. 6 Group was part of Royal Air Force (RAF) Bomber Command. However, a significant number of personnel from the RAF, Royal Australian Air Force (RAAF), Royal New Zealand Air Force (RNZAF) and other Allied air forces were attached to 6 Group during the war.

== Formation ==
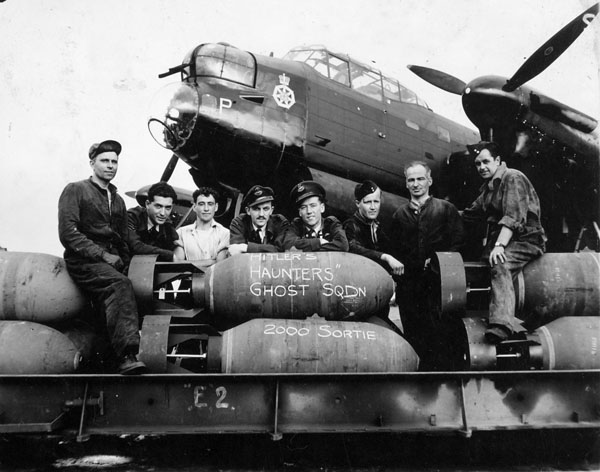
Aircrew and groundcrew of a No. 428 Squadron RCAF Lancaster bomber

Significant operations involving 6 Group included raids on U-boat bases in Lorient and Saint-Nazaire, France and night bombing raids on industrial complexes and urban centres in Germany.

The RCAF began participating in operations by RAF Bomber Command in 1941, but its squadrons were initially attached to RAF groups. In addition, many individual RCAF personnel belonged to RAF aircrews, in RAF squadrons. The Canadian government wanted RCAF bomber squadrons and personnel to be concentrated, as much as possible, in a distinct, identifiably Canadian group. To this end, 6 (RCAF) Group was formed on 25 October 1942 with eight squadrons.

At the peak of its strength, 6 Group consisted of 14 squadrons. Fifteen squadrons would eventually serve with the group, which was almost every RCAF heavy bomber squadron. Headquarters for 6 Group was at Allerton Park near Knaresborough and Harrogate in North Yorkshire.

Order of battle for No. 6 Group RCAF, April 1943
Station	Squadron	Aircraft	Version
RAF Croft	No. 420 Squadron RCAF; No. 427 Squadron RCAF; 1535 BATF	Vickers Wellington; Vickers Wellington; Airspeed Oxford	Mk.III; Mks.III, X
RAF Dishforth	No. 424 Squadron RCAF; No. 425 Squadron RCAF; No. 426 Squadron RCAF; No. 428 Squadron RCAF; No. 1659 (Canadian) Heavy Conversion Unit RAF; 1512 BATF	Vickers Wellington; Vickers Wellington; Vickers Wellington; Vickers Wellington; Handley Page Halifax; Airspeed Oxford	Mks.III, X Mks.III, X Mks.III, X Mks.III, X Mks.I, II
RAF Leeming	No. 420 Squadron RCAF	Handley Page Halifax	Mk.II
RAF Middleton St. George	No. 419 Squadron RCAF	Handley Page Halifax	Mk.II
RAF Skipton-on-Swale	No. 408 Squadron RCAF	Handley Page Halifax	Mk.II
RAF Topcliffe	Group Communications Flight (GCF)	British Aircraft Eagle; Foster Wikner Wicko	

== Operations ==
No. 6 Group flew 40,822 operational sorties. A total of 814 aircraft and approximately 5,700 airmen did not return from operations and 4,203 airmen lost their lives.

== Stations ==
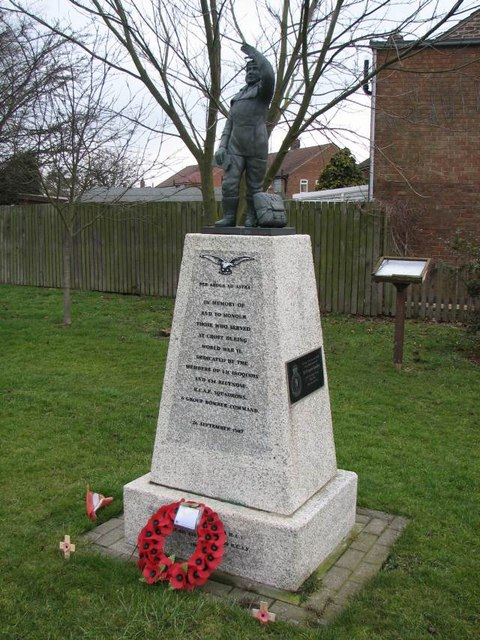
Memorial to 6 Group RCAF squadrons near RAF Croft. Text says "In memory of and to honour those who served at Croft during World War II. Dedicated by the members of 431 Iroquois and 434 Bluenose R.C.A.F Squadrons. 6 Group Bomber Command. 26 September 1987".

No. 6 Group was mainly formed from 4 Group, which was based primarily in Yorkshire. Once split, most of 6 Group's airfields were north of York and most of 4 Group's were south and east of the city. Like most other groups within RAF Bomber Command, the "base" system was used for station organization.

Four bases comprising 11 stations made up No. 6 Group. A base consisted of a main station, or headquarters, and a number of sub-stations. Late in 1943, Bomber Command bases were designated with a two-number identifier. The first number represented the group number, and the second number represented the base within that group. The first base within the group was the group's training base. No. 61 Base was therefore the training base for No. 6 Group. Each base was commanded by an air commodore, and each station was commanded by a group captain.

No. 61 (RCAF) Base	No. 62 (RCAF) (Beaver) Base	No. 63 (RCAF) Base	No. 64 (RCAF) Base
RAF Topcliffe, Yorkshire (HQ)	RAF Linton-on-Ouse, Yorkshire (HQ)	RAF Leeming, Yorkshire (HQ)	RAF Middleton St. George, County Durham (HQ)
RAF Dishforth, Yorkshire	RAF East Moor, Yorkshire	RAF Skipton-on-Swale, Yorkshire	RAF Croft, North Yorkshire
RAF Dalton, Yorkshire	RAF Tholthorpe, Yorkshire		
RAF Wombleton, Yorkshire			

== Commanders ==
No. 6 Group's commanders were:

- 25 October 1942 to 28 February 1944 Air Vice-Marshal George Brookes with headquarters at Allerton Park, Yorkshire, England
- 29 February 1944 to 13 July 1945 Air Vice-Marshal Clifford McEwen with headquarters at Allerton Park, Yorkshire, England
- 14 July to 1 September 1945 Air Commodore John Kerr at Main Headquarters at Halifax, Nova Scotia
- 14 July 45 to 1 September 1945 Air Commodore J L Hurley at Rear Headquarters, Allerton Park

== Operational squadrons ==
- No. 405 Squadron RCAF
- No. 408 Squadron RCAF
- No. 415 Squadron RCAF
- No. 419 Squadron RCAF
- No. 420 (Snowy Owl) Squadron RCAF
- No. 424 Squadron RCAF
- No. 425 Squadron RCAF
- No. 426 Squadron RCAF
- No. 427 Squadron RCAF
- No. 428 (Ghost) Squadron RCAF
- No. 429 Squadron RCAF
- No. 431 Squadron RCAF
- No. 432 (Leaside) Squadron RCAF
- No. 433 Squadron RCAF
- No. 434 Squadron RCAF

== See also ==
- List of Royal Air Force groups
