= RAF Croft =

Royal Air Force base in Yorkshire, England

RAF Croft
- Dalton-on-Tees, North Yorkshire in England
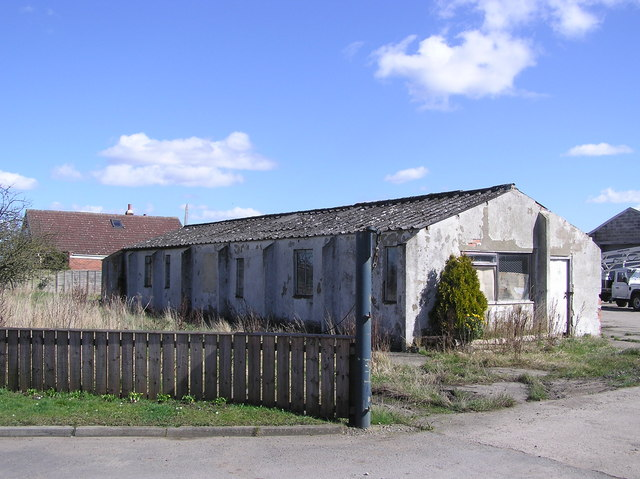
- A building at Cockleberry Saw Mill which was part of RAF Croft during the Second World War

Site information
- Type: Royal Air Force satellite station 1941–43; 64 (RCAF) Base substation 1943–
- Code: CR
- Owner: Air Ministry
- Operator: Royal Air Force (RAF); Royal Canadian Air Force (RCAF)
- Controlled by: RAF Bomber Command * No. 4 Group RAF * No. 6 Group RCAF

Location
- Shown within North Yorkshire RAF Croft (the United Kingdom)
- Coordinates: 54°27′09″N 001°33′11″W

Site history
- Built: 1940/41
- In use: October 1941 – 1952
- Battles/wars: European theatre of World War II

Airfield information
- Elevation: 55 metres (180 ft) AMSL
Runways
| Direction | Length and surface |
|---|---|
| 00/00 | Tarmac |
| 00/00 | Tarmac |
| 00/00 | Tarmac |

Royal Air Force Croft or more simply RAF Croft is a former Royal Air Force satellite station located 4.6 miles (7.4 km) south of Darlington, County Durham, England and 8 miles (13 km) north-east of Richmond, North Yorkshire. The site is also known locally as Croft Aerodrome or Neasham. Constructed at the same time as many other airfields, it was originally named RAF Dalton-on-Tees after the nearby village Dalton-on-Tees. However, it was quickly renamed RAF Croft (after Croft-on-Tees) after initial confusion with the also newly opened RAF Dalton near Thirsk, just 25 miles (40 km) away.

The airfield was opened in 1941 for use by the Royal Air Force (RAF) but by 1942 the aerodrome had been taken over by the Royal Canadian Air Force (RCAF) for training as part of No. 6 Group RCAF.

The station is now the site of Croft Circuit, a motor racing circuit which hosts various car championships including the British Touring Car Championship.

== History ==
The first squadron stationed at Croft was No. 78 Squadron RAF which arrived on 20 October 1941 flying both the Armstrong Whitworth Whitley Mk.V and the Handley Page Halifax Mk. II before leaving on 10 June 1942 when no units were stationed during the summer but on 1 October 1942 No. 419 Squadron RCAF has arrived with their Mk. III Vickers Wellingtons before re-equipping with the Halifax II and leaving on 10 November 1942. During this time on 7 November 1942, 427 Squadron RCAF was formed at the airfield with a mixture of Mk III's and Mk X's Wellington before leaving on 4 May 1943.

In 1943, Croft became a sub-station of RAF Middleton St George which was allocated to No. 6 Group, Royal Canadian Air Force.

The airfield also hosted No. 1664 (Royal Canadian Air Force) Heavy Conversion Unit RAF starting from 10 May 1943 which trained new pilots to fly the new heavy bombers using the Mk II and the Mk IV Halifax before leaving on 7 December 1943. When three days later on the tenth No. 431 Squadron RCAF began using the airfield with the Halifax Mks V and III and the Avro Lancaster Mk.X before leaving on 7 June 1945 going to Canada. This squadron was joined by 434 Squadron RCAF which had joined on 11 December 1944 also flying the Halifax and the Lancaster before leaving on 15 June 1945 to also go to Canada.

After the RCAF left in 1945, Croft saw little wartime activity. Later in 1945 the aerodrome became a satellite of No. 13 Operational Training Unit RAF based at Middleton St. George flying de Havilland Mosquitoes. The station was closed in the summer of 1946.

The following units were also here at some point:

- Detachment of No. 6 Anti-Aircraft Co-operation Unit RAF (January 1943)
- No. 78 Conversion Flight (January – June 1942)
- Relief Landing Ground for No. 205 Advanced Flying School RAF (2 February 1951 - 1 June 1954)
- No. 205 AFS between 12 December 1952 and 1 January 1954 while runways at home base resurfaced
- 822 Naval Air Squadron
- No. 1516 (Beam Approach Training) Flight RAF (September – October 1942)

== Incidents ==
On 22 March 1945, a Royal Canadian Air Force Lancaster aircraft was taking off from Croft when it was caught in a crosswind and blown off the runway where a punctured tyre led to it crashing and the port engine catching fire. The crew extricated themselves and as the 4-pound (1.8 kg) incendiary bombs were exploding in the fire, the base and local residents were evacuated to shelter in a cutting of the nearby railway line. At 11:27 am, the 4,000-pound (1,800 kg) blockbuster bomb on board the Lancaster exploded and took the roofs off several buildings in the immediate vicinity.

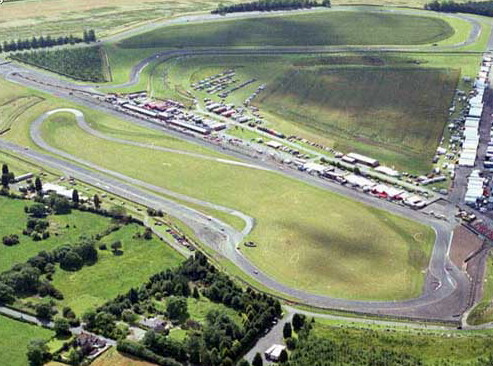
Croft Circuit, North Yorkshire.

== Current use ==
The Croft aerodrome is now Croft Circuit, a venue for the British Touring Car Championship and British Superbike Championship.

== See also ==
- List of former Royal Air Force stations
