= 434 Operational Test and Evaluation Squadron =

- Active: 1943–1945; 1953–1962; 1963–1967; 1968–2000; 2018–present
- Country: Canada
- Branch: Royal Canadian Air Force
- Role: Various
- Part of: Royal Canadian Air Force Aerospace Warfare Centre
- Base: CFB Trenton
- Motto: In excelsis vincimus (Latin for 'We conquer in the heights')
- Battle honours: English Channel and North Sea 1943–1944, Baltic 1943–1944, Fortress Europe 1943–1944, France and Germany 1944–1945, Biscay Ports 1944, Ruhr 1943–1945, Berlin 1943–1944, German Ports 1944–1945, Normandy 1944, Rhine

Aircraft flown
- Bomber: Handley Page Halifax; Avro Lancaster
- Electronic warfare: CC-144 Challenger
- Fighter: Canadair Sabre; Canadair CF-5; CF-104 Starfighter
- Trainer: Canadair CT-133 Silver Star

434 Operational Test and Evaluation Squadron is a Royal Canadian Air Force bomber squadron that flew bombing operations over Europe during World War II and was later a post-war fighter and combat support unit. It was disbanded in 2000. The squadron was reactivated in May 2018 as 434 Operational Test and Evaluation.

== History ==
=== Second World War ===
The unit was first formed at RAF Tholthorpe, United Kingdom on 13 June 1943, flying the Handley Page Halifax Mk V. On 13 August 1943 it flew its first operational sortie, a bombing raid across the Alps to Milan, Italy. In May 1944 the unit received Halifax Mk IIIs to replace its Mk Vs. The squadron was adopted by the Rotary Club of Halifax, Nova Scotia and to show its connection to the city adopted the nickname "Bluenose Squadron", the common nickname for people from Nova Scotia and a tribute to the schooner Bluenose; an image of the schooner appeared on the squadron badge.

The squadron moved to RAF Croft in December 1943 and re-equipped with Avro Lancaster Mk Is and Mk Xs in December 1944. After VE Day the squadron was earmarked for Tiger Force to carry on the war against Japan, but was never deployed to the Far East. The unit was disbanded at Dartmouth, Nova Scotia on 5 September 1945.

During World War II the unit flew 198 missions, including 179 bombing, 17 mine laying, one diversionary and one sea search. This was made up of a total of 2582 individual aircraft sorties, including 45 prisoner of war airlift sorties. It flew 14,622 operational flying hours and dropped 10,358 tons of bombs plus 225 mines. The squadron accounted for seven enemy aircraft destroyed along with two probable and four damaged. 434 Squadron suffered 75 aircraft lost, 484 aircrew operational casualties, including 34 killed, 313 presumed dead, 121 made prisoners and 16 who evaded capture and escaped. The non-operational casualty total was eight killed, plus one member who died of natural causes. Unit personnel received six bars to the Distinguished Flying Cross, 108 DFCs, six Distinguished Flying Medals, one British Empire Medal and seven Mentions in Despatches.

=== Postwar ===
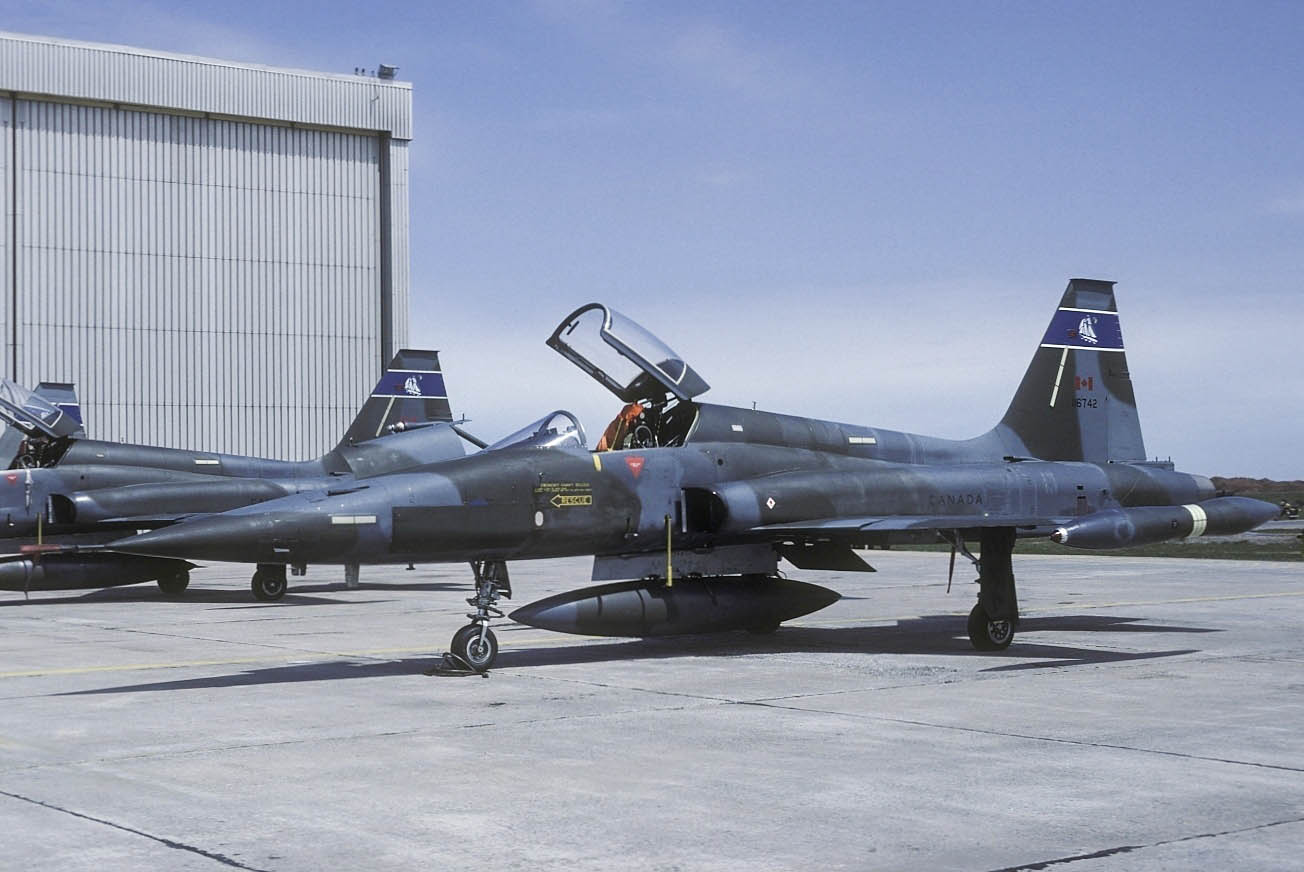
CF-116 Freedom Fighters with the schooner badge on the tail

The squadron was reformed flying the Canadair Sabre and stationed as part of 3 Wing at RCAF Station Zweibrücken, West Germany on 7 March 1953, but was stood down on 16 June 1962. It was re-activated on 8 April 1963 as a Canadair CF-104 Starfighter unit in the strike/attack role and disbanded again on 1 March 1967.

434 Operational Training Squadron formed at CFB Cold Lake as the Canadair CF-5 operational training unit on 15 February 1968. The squadron later gave up OTU duties to 419 Squadron and became an operational squadron, moving to CFB Bagotville on 15 July 1982 later to CFB Chatham in July 1985.

The unit became 434 Composite Squadron and reformed at CFB Shearwater on 4 July 1992. The name was changed to 434 Combat Support Squadron and the unit moved to CFB Greenwood in mid-1995, flying the CC-144 Challenger and Canadair CT-133 Silver Star in the electronic warfare role. The squadron was finally disbanded there in May 2000.

The squadron was reactivated in May 2018 at CFB Trenton as a test and evaluation unit.

== Aircraft ==
- Handley Page Halifax
- Avro Lancaster
- Canadair Sabre
- Canadair CF-104 Starfighter
- Canadair CF-5 Freedom Fighter
- Canadair CT-133 Silver Star
- Canadair Challenger

== Badges ==
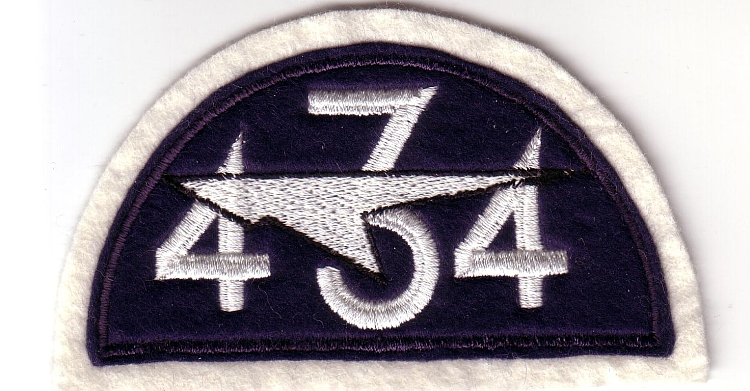
434 Squadron badge from the mid-1970s

CF-5 badge worn by squadron aircrew and groundcrew in the mid-1970s
