= Clifford McEwen =

Royal Air Force Air Vice-Marshal (1896-1967)

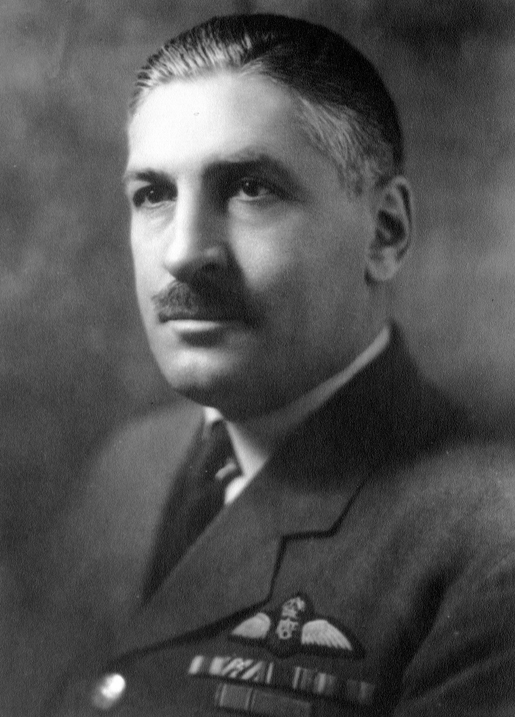
- Born: 2 July 1896; Griswold, Manitoba
- Died: 6 August 1967 (aged 71); Toronto, Ontario
- Burial place: National Field of Honour, Pointe-Claire, Quebec
- Military career
- Allegiance: Canada
- Branch: Royal Flying Corps; Royal Canadian Air Force
- Service years: 1916–1946
- Rank: Air Vice-Marshal
- Nickname: Black Mike
- Units: 196th Battalion, CEF; No. 28 Squadron RFC
- Commands: No. 1 Group RCAF; No. 6 Group RCAF
- Conflicts: World War I World War II
- Awards: Companion of the Order of the Bath; Military Cross; Distinguished Flying Cross (2); Bronze Medal of Military Valor
- Other work: Director, Trans-Canada Air Lines

Air Vice Marshal Clifford Mackay McEwen CB, MC, DFC & Bar (2 July 1896 – 6 August 1967) was a fighter ace in the British Royal Flying Corps during World War I and a senior commander in the Royal Canadian Air Force during World War II. His Second World War service culminated in his commanding No. 6 Group RCAF in England from 28 February 1944 to 13 July 1945.

During his command the performance of the RCAF was greatly improved, becoming the most successful Allied bombing force in several ways. By late 1944 the RCAF had both the best survival rate and the highest accuracy of any bombing force.

McEwen was born on 2 July 1896 in Griswold, Manitoba and grew up in Moose Jaw, Saskatchewan.

Military offices
New title Base formed	Air Officer Commanding Linton-on-Ouse Operational Base (RAF); Renamed No. 62 Base October 1943; June 1943 – February 1944	Succeeded by A D Ross
Preceded by G E Brookes	Air Officer Commanding No. 6 Group RCAF; 29 February 1944 - 13 July 1945	Succeeded by J G Kerr; At Main Headquarters
Preceded by G E Brookes	Air Officer Commanding No. 6 Group RCAF; 29 February 1944 - 13 July 1945	Succeeded by J L Hurley; At Rear Headquarters
