= No. 4 Flying Training School RAF =

- School badge
- Active: 1921–1941; 1947–1954; 1954–1958; 1960–present
- Country: United Kingdom
- Branch: Royal Air Force
- Type: Flying training school
- Role: Advanced fast-jet training
- Part of: Directorate of Flying Training
- Station: RAF Valley
- Mottos: E sabulo ad sidera (Latin for 'From sand to the stars')
- Aircraft: BAE Hawk T2; Beechcraft Texan T1

No. 4 Flying Training School is a Royal Air Force military flying training school, which manages Advanced Fast Jet Training (AFJT) from its base at RAF Valley in Anglesey, Wales. Its role is to provide fast jet aircrew to the Operational Conversion Units for the RAF's jet attack aircraft, the Eurofighter Typhoon and the Lockheed Martin F-35 Lightning II.

No. 4 FTS has primarily provided advanced flying and more recently jet aircraft training to aircrew students, although during World War II it was called upon to take part in offensive operations, a role it took on with great success.

== History ==
On 1 April 1921, No 4 Flying Training School opened at Abu Sueir in Egypt to train pilots, primarily for squadrons based in the Middle East

Between 1935 and 1936, the expansion of the RAF in line with the increasing tensions in Europe led to major changes in how the RAF delivered flying training. Civilian flying training organisations were used to provide basic flying instruction, while the Service schools focused on the more advanced training.

On 1 September 1939, two days before war was declared in Europe, it moved to RAF Habbaniya, the large RAF base in Iraq, where intense flying training activities could take place in clearer skies. Because of its location, few aircrew students were sent out from the UK, and the school had to recruit from the Middle and Far East. After completing the course, pupils were sent to Abu Sueir for further training or directly to operational squadrons in theatre. In February 1940 the school was renamed No. 4 Service Flying Training School, to differentiate it from an Elementary Flying Training School. The school moved to a war footing, forming 'Y' Operational squadron to defend against air attack.

The School also took on further training of Observers and air gunners, in line with requirements. By Spring 1941, other training schemes were beginning to produce sufficient pilots, and it was decided to close the school in September. However, the political situation in Iraq deteriorated, and the School was forced to fight. The Habbaniya Air Striking Force was created from the School (plus the 3 Vickers Valentia aircraft of Iraq Communications Flight) under the command of Group Captain W A B Saville.

A rebel coup in Baghdad resulted in a British deployment in Basrah to protect Iraqi oil resources. The rebels began to gather troops and artillery south of Habbaniya airfield. The School's instructors combined with the more experienced pupils to man the aircraft and weaponise them. On 2 May 1941, the School attacked the enemy positions. The battle for Habbaniya lasted 5 days, during which the School's aircraft had flown 584 sorties, fired 100,000 rounds and dropped 45 tonnes of bombs on the enemy, finally forcing the rebel forces to retreat. Their overall contribution to the situation in Iraq led to the recapture of Baghdad by British forces, and during the emergency which lasted almost a month, 4 SFTS flew 1605 operational sorties, the majority crewed by student pilots. By June, the aircraft were redeployed elsewhere and on 1 July 1941, the School was disbanded.

=== Second Formation ===
On 3 February 1947, No 4 FTS reformed at Heany, near Bulawayo in what was Southern Rhodesia, using Avro Ansons, De Havilland Tiger Moth and North American Harvards. By 1948, the School's role of training both pilots and navigators had become unworkable, and navigation training was moved to the new No. 3 Air Navigation School at Thornhill in Rhodesia, along with their Anson aircraft. In October 1949, the Air Council mandated changes to the status of cadets, and officer training became a part of the syllabus. Upon completion, those who qualified for their wings and met officer quality standards were commissioned. By November 1950 all pilot and navigator candidates were commissioned before they started their flying training as Acting Pilot Officers, and received full commissions upon gaining their wings. In October 1953, the final passing out parade took place, and the School disbanded again on 26 January 1954.

=== Third Formation ===
The RAF's Advanced Flying Schools operating in the early 1950s provided a step between elementary flying training and the operational conversion unit. The restructuring of flying training in the RAF led to a renumbering of AFSs, and on 1 June 1954, No. 205 AFS at RAF Middleton St George operating Gloster Meteor jet aircraft, was renumbered as No. 4 FTS. In January 1955, the School re-equipped with the de Havilland Vampire T.11 trainer.

4 FTS moved to Worksop in June 1956 and absorbed No. 211 FTS and its Meteor aircraft, which it operated alongside the Vampires for 18 months. On 9 June 1958, 4 FTS again disbanded.

=== Fourth Formation ===
From 1958, 4 FTS's role was carried on by No. 7 FTS on the Vampire at RAF Valley, until 15 August 1960, whereupon it was renumbered 4 FTS again. At this stage, the School took on the role of training students for Coastal and Transport Commands, using Varsity T.1s. This was short-lived, and by March 1962 this role was transferred to No. 5 FTS at Oakington. 4 FTS started to receive the new Folland Gnat T.1 on 7 November 1962, and the School was solely a Gnat unit by August 1963. Students from the Jet Provost stream came through onto the Gnat for advanced Jet training, and then proceeded onto No. 229 OCU at RAF Chivenor for air warfare training. In 1964, the School formed the Yellow Jacks aerobatic team. By 1965, this resulted in the formation of the Central Flying School's Red Arrows. In 1967, the Hunter T.7 and F.6 were brought into service, supplementing the Gnat squadrons, and were involved in the training not only of 'long-legged' pupils who found the small Gnat constrictive, but also of foreign Air Forces.

The Hawk T.1, which is currently flown by the School, was first delivered in 1976. The last Gnat course graduated on 24 November 1979, and in 17 years the School had flown more than 157,000 Gnat hours and trained 1421 students. Over 17 years, the School flew 89 Gnats, and 28 were written off in accidents. The Hawk was the first jet trainer in the Air Force that was not an adaptation of a fighter aircraft. It was extremely suited for its role, being designed to replace the several different types then in service with the RAF - the Jet Provost, the Gnat and the Hunter. The Hawk was so successful that it allowed the RAF to retire the Hunter and Gnat fleets a year earlier than planned. Easy to operate and simple to maintain, the Hawk was more economical than the Gnat, as well as having increased range and the ability to spin, a vital training task. In July 1977, the School's first Hawk course started.

== Role and operations ==
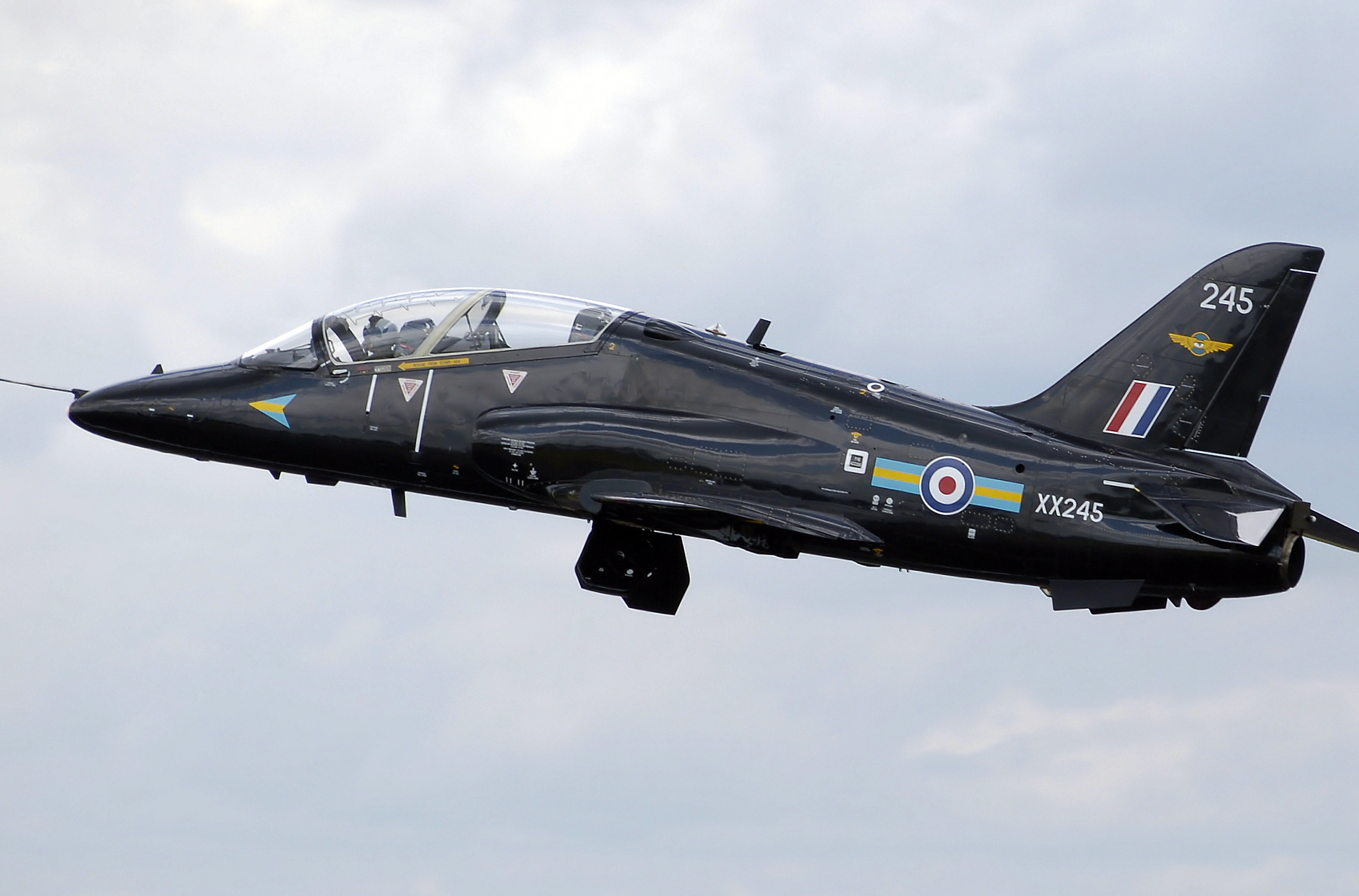
A Hawk T.1 of 208(R) Squadron

Following Elementary Flying Training, fast jet students from the Royal Air Force and the Fleet Air Arm of the Royal Navy progress onto basic fast jet training on the Tucano T.1, upon which RAF students are awarded their 'wings', before being posted to 4 FTS at RAF Valley to complete the Advanced fast jet course in flying the Hawk jet trainer and learning air warfare and tactics. Upon passing the advanced course, they are streamed to one of the Operational Conversion Units, either No. 29 Squadron for the Typhoon or (from July 2019) No. 207 Squadron for the Lightning.

Due to the obsolescence of the Hawk T.1 aircraft No. 208 Squadron was disbanded in April 2016. However, due to the introduction of the Lightning into service and a consequent need for greater numbers of pilots, it was announced in August 2018 that a second Hawk T.2 squadron would be formed under 4FTS at Valley. No. 25(F) Squadron will reform to assume the role of converting pilots from the Tucano to jet propulsion, with IV Squadron to focus on weapons and tactics training.

== Units ==
Units forming No. 4 Flying Training School.

- RAF Valley
  - Headquarters No. 4 Flying Training School
    - No. 4 Squadron – BAE Hawk T2
    - No. 25 Squadron – BAE Hawk T2
    - No. 72 Squadron – Beechcraft Texan T1
    - Central Flying School Advanced Training Unit

== Aircraft operated ==
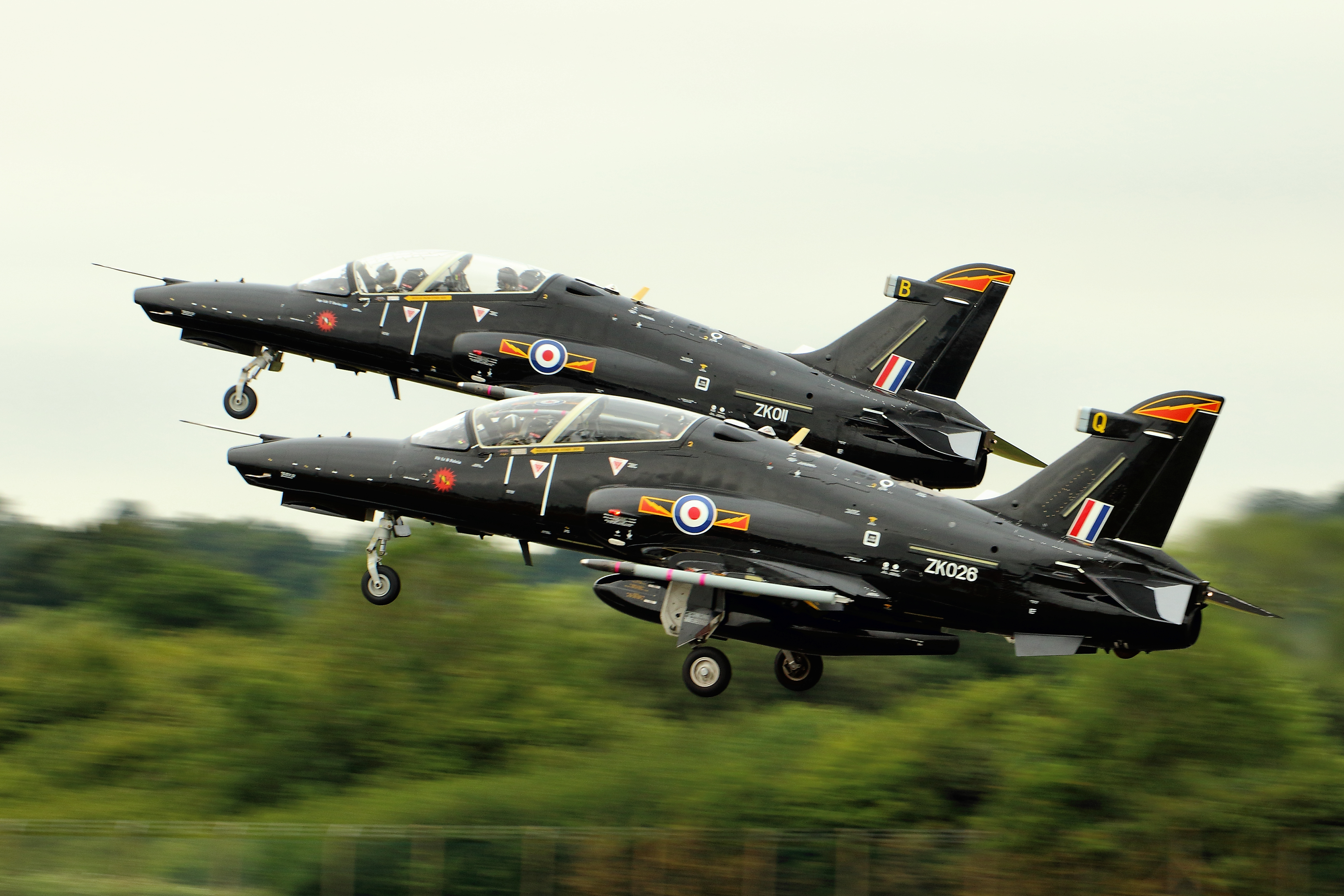
Hawk T.2s of 4(R) Squadron

- Beechcraft Texan T1 - 2019 - present
- BAE Systems Hawk - 1976 - present
- Folland Gnat (1962 - 1978)
- Hawker Hunter (1967 - 1980)
- Gloster Meteor (1944-1958)
- de Havilland Vampire (1952 - 1963)
- Airspeed Oxford
- Armstrong Whitworth Atlas
- Armstrong Whitworth Siskin
- Avro 504
- Avro Anson
- Avro Tutor
- Bristol Fighter
- BAC Jet Provost
- De Havilland DH9A
- de Havilland Tiger Moth
- de Havilland Canada DHC-1 Chipmunk
- Fairey IIIF
- Fairey Gordon
- Fairchild Cornell
- Gloster Grebe
- Gloster Gladiator
- Hawker Audax
- Hawker Hart
- North American Harvard
- Percival Provost
- Sopwith Camel
- Vickers Varsity
- Vickers Vimy
