= RAF Middleton St George =

English Royal Air Force station (1941–1964)

RAF Middleton St George RAF Goosepool
- Near Middleton St George, County Durham in England
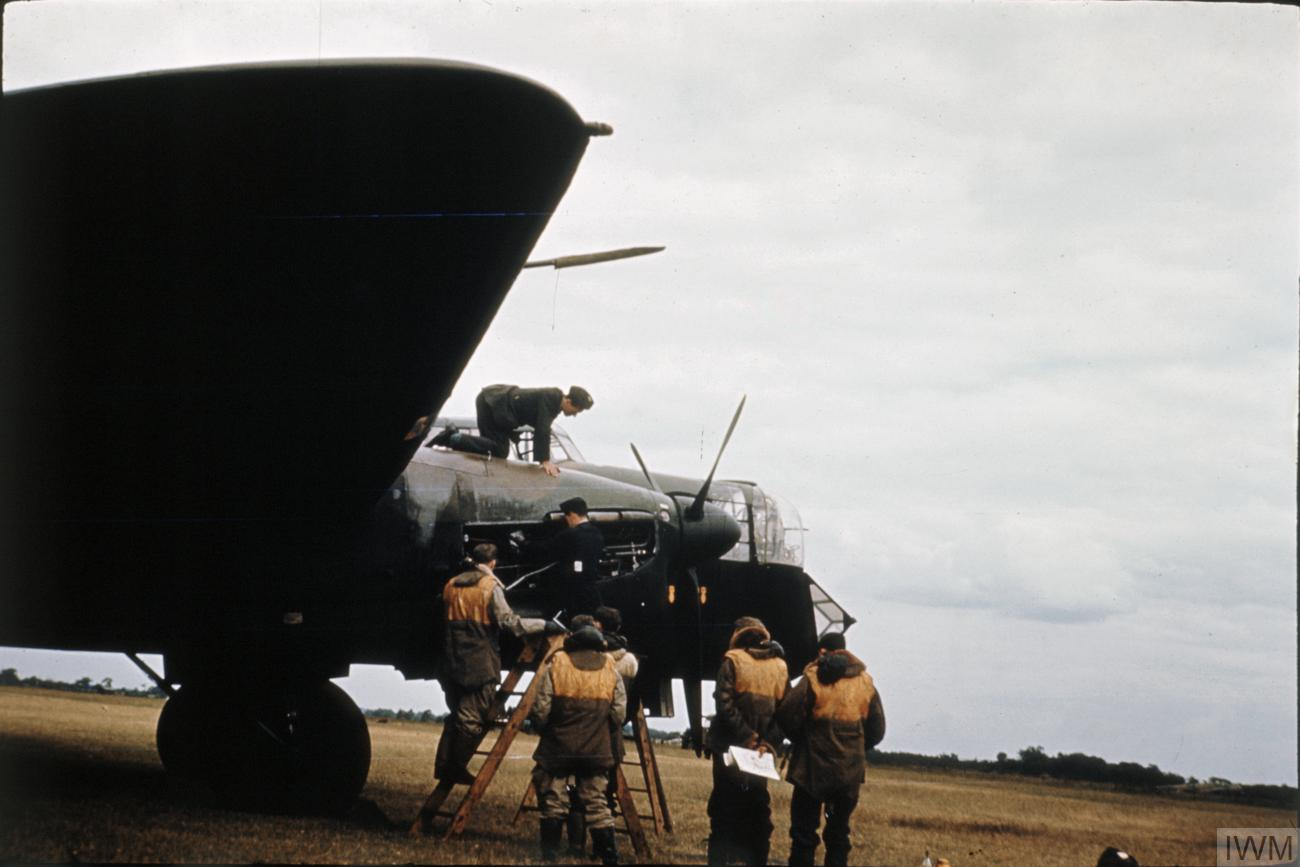
- A crew of No. 78 Squadron RAF watch as engine adjustments are made to an Armstrong Whitworth Whitley bomber, Z6743, before they take off for a raid from Middleton St George.

Site information
- Type: Royal Air Force station
- Code: MG
- Owner: Ministry of Defence
- Operator: Royal Air Force; Royal Canadian Air Force
- Controlled by: RAF Bomber Command 1941-45; RAF Fighter Command; 1945-47 & 1956-64; RAF Flying Training Command 1947-56

Location
- Shown within County Durham RAF Middleton St George (the United Kingdom)
- Coordinates: 54°30′33″N 001°25′46″W
- Grid reference: NZ375130

Site history
- Built: 1939
- In use: January 1941 - April 1964
- Fate: repurposed to Teesside International Airport
- Battles/wars: European theatre of World War II; Cold War

Airfield information
- Elevation: 35 metres (115 ft) AMSL
Runways
Direction	Length and surface
01/19	1,006 metres (3,301 ft) Concrete
05/23	2,291 metres (7,516 ft) Concrete
10/28	1,280 metres (4,199 ft) Concrete

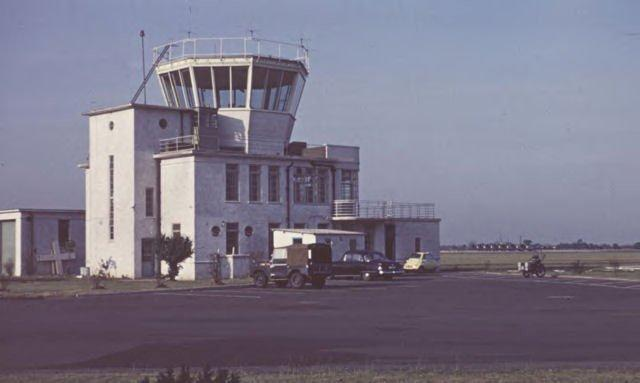
RAF. Middleton St George August 1960

RAF Middleton St George is a former Royal Air Force (RAF) and Royal Canadian Air Force (RCAF) Bomber Command station during the Second World War. It was located in County Durham, 6 mi (9.7 km) east of Darlington, England. The station's motto was Shield and Deter. The aerodrome remains active as Teesside International Airport.

== History ==
=== Second World War ===
Like many similar airfields; RAF Middleton St George was commissioned in 1938 in anticipation of WWII and opened in 1941 under the auspices of Bomber Command. Contrary to popular belief the airfield was never called RAF Goosepool, Goosepool being the name of the farm which made way for the airfield, with the name sticking amongst the local population.

Initial Squadrons based here were 76 Squadron with Handley Page Halifaxes and 78 Squadron which flew Armstrong Whitworth Whitleys.

In 1943 it was allocated to No. 6 Group, Royal Canadian Air Force. A sub-station was located at RAF Croft, Yorkshire although RAF Thornaby was closer yet never held sub-station status. Canadian Squadrons based here were 419 "Moose" Squadron, which flew Vickers Wellingtons, Halifaxes, and Avro Lancasters, 420 "Snowy Owl" Squadron, which flew Wellingtons, and 428 "Ghost" Squadron, which flew Wellingtons, Halifaxes, and Lancasters.

There are two stories of heroism linked with RAF Middleton St George, the most notable being that of Andrew Mynarski, a member of 419 Squadron, who was posthumously awarded the Victoria Cross. It was bestowed for his actions on 13 June 1944, in a raid on Cambrai, France, in support of the Normandy landings. A statue of Mynarski was dedicated in 2005 outside the former Officers' Mess. The second belongs to William McMullen of 428 Squadron, who was killed during a routine training sortie on 13 January 1945 when his Lancaster crashed on the outskirts of Darlington after he remained with the aircraft to steer it away from houses, having ordered his crew to bail out. McMullen Road adjacent to the crash site was renamed in his honour.

A memorial garden for all aircrew at Middleton St George is also located near the Mess.

=== Post war ===
After the war, the aerodrome changed hands regularly between Bomber Command, Fighter Command and Flying Training Command, serving various squadrons and units including No. 13 Operational Training Unit (OTU) using de Havilland Mosquitos, No. 2 Air Navigation School using Avro Ansons and Vickers Wellingtons, No. 205 Advanced Flying Training School (later renumbered No. 4 Flying Training School) using de Havilland Vampires and Gloster Meteors, 92 Squadron using Hawker Hunters, 264 Squadron (later renumbered No. 33 Squadron) using Gloster Meteors, the Javelin Instrument Rating Squadron (IRS) using Gloster Javelins and the Lightning Conversion Unit (LCU) (later renamed the Lightning Conversion Squadron) using English Electric Lightnings. The IRS and LCS were later merged to form 226 Operational Conversion Unit (OCU).

In 1962 Flying Officer Jean Oakes became the first woman to fly at over 1,000 mph (1,600 km/h). The Times of 14 September 1962 reported that a Lightning from RAF Middleton St George flew out over the North Sea, and at 35,000 feet (11,000 m), she took over the controls from Flight Lieutenant John Smith and flew up and down the north east coast at about Mach 1.6.

The RAF left the station in 1964 and handed it over to the Ministry of Civil Aviation who reopened the site as a civil airport. The airfield was named Tees-Side Airport until 1987, then Teesside International Airport until 2004 when it became Durham Tees Valley Airport before reverting to Teesside International in 2019.

From 1968 to 1979, some of the former station buildings housed Middleton St George College of Education, a teacher training college.

The officers' mess at the base was converted into the St George Hotel, complete with the RAF Middleton St George memorial room. The hotel was mothballed in late 2018; the museum is to be relocated in the future.

The Sergeants' mess remains in use by Serco, who operate the International Fire Training Centre located on the site, and the Armoury currently houses a flying school, Scenic Air Tours and Flight Training.

== Units and aircraft ==
Unit	Dates	Aircraft	Variant	Notes
Bomber Command No.4 Group RAF
No. 76 Squadron RAF	1941-1942	Handley Page HP.57 Halifax	Mk.I	Four-engined piston heavy bomber.
No. 76 Squadron RAF	1941-1942	Handley Page HP.59 Halifax	Mk.II	Four-engined piston heavy bomber.
No. 78 Squadron RAF	1941	Armstrong AW.38 Whitworth Whitley	Mk.V	Twin-engined medium bomber.
No. 78 Squadron RAF	1942	Handley Page HP.57 Halifax	Mk.II	Four-engined piston heavy bomber.
No. 1516 BAT Flight RAF	1941-1942	Airspeed AS.10 Oxford	Mk.I	Twin-engined training aircraft.
No. 1535 BAT Flight RAF	1942-1943	Airspeed AS.10 Oxford	Mk.I	Twin-engined training aircraft.
Bomber Command No.6 Group RCAF
No. 419 "Moose" Squadron RCAF	1942-1944	Handley Page HP.59 Halifax	Mk.II	Four-engined piston heavy bomber.
No. 419 "Moose" Squadron RCAF	1943-1945	Avro 683 Lancaster	Mk.X	Four-engined piston heavy bomber.
No. 420 "Snowy Owl" Squadron RCAF	1942-1943	Vickers 417 Wellington	Mk.III	Twin-engined medium bomber.
No. 420 "Snowy Owl" Squadron RCAF	1942-1943	Vickers 440 Wellington	Mk.X	Twin-engined medium bomber.
No. 428 "Ghost" Squadron RCAF	1943-1944	Handley Page HP.59 Halifax	Mk.II	Four-engined piston heavy bomber.
No. 428 "Ghost" Squadron RCAF	1943-1944	Handley Page HP.63 Halifax	Mk.V	Four-engined piston heavy bomber.
No. 428 "Ghost" Squadron RCAF	1944-1945	Avro 683 Lancaster	Mk.X	Four-engined piston heavy bomber.
Fighter Command RAF
No. 13 Operational Training Unit RAF	1945-1947	de Havilland DH.98 Mosquito	FB.VI	Twin-engined fighter-bomber.
No. 13 Operational Training Unit RAF	1945-1947	de Havilland DH.98 Mosquito	NF.II	Twin-engined night fighter.
No. 13 Operational Training Unit RAF	1945-1947	de Havilland DH.98 Mosquito	T.3	Twin-engined training aircraft.
No. 26 Gliding School Air Cadets	1946-1955	Slingsby T.7 Kirby Cadet	TX.1	Training glider.
No. 26 Gliding School Air Cadets	1946-1955	Slingsby T.21B Sedbergh	TX.1	Training glider.
No. 28 Gliding School Air Cadets	1946-1948	Slingsby T.7 Kirby Cadet	TX.1	Training glider.
No. 28 Gliding School Air Cadets	1946-1948	Slingsby T.7 Kirby Cadet	TX.2	Training glider.
Flying Training Command RAF
No. 2 Air Navigation School RAF	1947-1950	Avro 652A Anson	Mk.I	Twin-engined multi-role aircraft.
No. 2 Air Navigation School RAF	1947-1950	Vickers 440 Wellington	B.X	Twin-engined medium bomber.
No. 2 Air Navigation School RAF	1949-1950	Vickers 619 Wellington	T.10	Twin-engined medium bomber.
No. 205 Advanced Flying Training School RAF	1950-1954	de Havilland DH.100 Vampire	FB.5	Single-engined fighter-bomber.
No. 205 Advanced Flying Training School RAF	1950-1954	Gloster Meteor	F.4	Twin-engined single-seat fighter.
No. 205 Advanced Flying Training School RAF	1950-1954	Gloster Meteor	T.7	Twin-engined two-seat training aircraft.
No. 4 Flying Training School RAF	1954-1956	de Havilland DH.100 Vampire	FB.5	Single-engined fighter-bomber.
No. 4 Flying Training School RAF	1954-1956	Gloster Meteor	F.4	Twin-engined single-seat fighter.
No. 4 Flying Training School RAF	1954-1956	Gloster Meteor	T.7	Twin-engined two-seat training aircraft.
No. 4 Flying Training School RAF	1955-1956	de Havilland DH.115 Vampire	T.11	Single-engined training jet.
Fighter Command No.13 Group RAF
No. 92 Squadron RAF	1957-1961	Hawker Hunter	F.6	Single-engined jet fighter/fighter-bomber.
No. 264 Squadron RAF	1957	Gloster Meteor	NF.14	Twin-engined jet night-fighter.
Middleton St George Station Flight RAF	1957	Avro 652A Anson	Mk.I	Twin-engined multi-role aircraft.
Middleton St George Station Flight RAF	1957	de Havilland DH.115 Vampire	T.11	Single-engined training jet.
Middleton St George Station Flight RAF	1957	Gloster Meteor	T.7	Twin-engined two-seat training aircraft.
No. 33 Squadron RAF	1958-1962	Gloster Javelin	FAW.7	Twin-engined jet fighter/interceptor.
No. 33 Squadron RAF	1960-1962	Gloster Javelin	FAW.9	Twin-engined jet fighter/interceptor.
No. 645 Volunteer Gliding Squadron Air Cadets	1958-1960			
Instrument Rating Squadron RAF	1961-1963	Gloster Javelin	T.3	Twin-engined jet fighter/interceptor.
Lightning Conversion Unit RAF	1961-1963	English Electric Lightning	F.1	Twin-engined single-seat fighter-interceptor.
Lightning Conversion Squadron RAF	1961-1963	English Electric Lightning	T.4	Twin-engined two-seat fighter-interceptor.
No. 226 Operational Conversion Unit RAF	1963-1964	English Electric Lightning	F.1	Twin-engined single-seat fighter-interceptor.
No. 226 Operational Conversion Unit RAF	1963-1964	English Electric Lightning	T.4	Twin-engined two-seat fighter-interceptor.
