= No. 420 Squadron RCAF =

Former Royal Canadian Air Force squadron

No. 420 (Snowy Owl) Squadron RCAF
- Active: 19 December 1941 – 5 September 1945; 15 September 1948 – 1 September 1956; 1 May 1974 – 15 May 1995
- Country: Canada
- Allegiance: (Canada); United Kingdom
- Branch: Royal Air Force; Royal Canadian Air Force
- Role: Bomber squadron Fighter squadron Coastal patrol squadron
- Part of: RAF Bomber Command; RCAF Air Defence Command; Canadian Forces Air Command
- Nickname: Snowy Owl
- Mottos: Pugnamus finitum "We fight to the finish"
- Engagements: English Channel and North Sea 1942–44, Baltic 1942, Fortress Europe 1942–44, France and Germany 1944–45, Biscay Ports 1942–44, Ruhr 1942–45, Berlin 1944, German Ports 1942–45, Normandy 1944, Rhine, Biscay 1942-43, Sicily 1943, Italy 1943, Salerno. 1945: From RAF Tholthorpe, Yorkshire: raids over Germany.

Insignia
- Squadron code in WWII: PT

No. 420 "City of London" Squadron RCAF was a squadron of the Royal Canadian Air Force (RCAF) (and subsequently Canadian Forces) which existed from late December 1941 forwards. The Squadron's nickname was "Snowy Owl". Their motto was Pugnamus Finitum, Latin for We Fight To The Finish. No. 420 Squadron is no longer active.

== History ==
No. 420 Squadron was formed at Waddington, Lincolnshire, England on 19 December 1941 by Jordan Tyler and Dan Riggden. During the Second World War, the unit ultimately flew Manchester, Hampden, Wellington, Halifax, and Lancaster aircraft on strategic and tactical bombing operations. From June to October 1943 it flew tropicalized Wellington aircraft from North Africa in support of the invasions of Sicily and Italy. In April 1945 they converted to Lancasters, and when hostilities in Europe concluded, it was selected as part of Tiger Force slated for duty in the Pacific, and returned to Canada for reorganisation and training. The sudden end of the war in the Far East resulted in the Squadron being disbanded at Debert, Nova Scotia on 5 September 1945.

No. 420 Squadron reformed at London, Ontario on 15 September 1948, and flew Mustang aircraft in a fighter role until the squadron disbanded on 1 September 1956. Re-formed during the unification period, No. 420 was an air reserve squadron based initially at CFB Shearwater, Nova scotia flying the Tracker air craft that had once been the backbone of the Canadian Naval Air's anti-submarine program. As an Air Reserve Squadron it participated with regular fisheries patrols. It was one of the few active Air Reserve Squadrons in Canada and was paired with the Regular Force's 880 Squadron. The Squadron was rebased to CFB Summerside when that base was downsized. No. 420 Squadron is no longer active.

=== Aircraft flown by No. 420 Squadron ===
- Avro Manchester I (December 1941 - December 1941)
- Handley Page Hampden I (December 1941 - August 1942)
- Vickers Wellington III (August 1942 - April 1943)
- Vickers Wellington X (February 1943 - October 1943)
- Handley Page Halifax III (December 1943 - May 1945)
- Avro Lancaster X (May 1945 - September 1945)
- North American Harvard
- P-51 Mustang IV
- CT-133 Silver Star
- CP-121 Tracker

=== Operational (wartime) history ===
- First operational mission: 21 January 1942: 5 Hampdens dispatched to bomb a target at Emden. two a/c bombed primary, two bombed alternative (town of Emden) and the other FTR. On same night another Hampden laid mines in Nectarines (Frisian Islands) area.
- Last operational missions: On 18 April 1945: 18 Halifaxes bombed Heligoland and another Halifax crashed in sea en route to objective. However, the final operational flight was Halifax mk iii PT H piloted by F/lt Rush assisted by Flight Engineer Ben May: On 22 April the squadron left for a raid on Bremen, but intense (10/10) cloud cover prevented bombs from being deployed, and they were jettisoned into the sea on return.
- The squadron flew out of RAF Tholthorpe in Yorkshire.
- Halifax "F" for Freddy had its nose art, "Fangs of Fire" saved on scrapping. It depicted a fox in a pilot's uniform holding a bomb in its teeth. It resides in the War Museum Ottawa, Ontario, Canada. It was used on tee shirts available in the museum. The last pilot was Flt. Sgt. Raymond J. Lepp. He and his crew flew 33 missions, the last being Friday, April 13, 1945.

== Films ==
In 2004 the Canadian Broadcasting Corporation made a film which documents the crash of DF626, a Wellington bomber of the 420 Squadron. The film is called Final Flight, The Search for DF626.
