= 425 Tactical Fighter Squadron =

- 425^{e} Escadron d'appui tactique
- Active: 1942–1945, 1954–present
- Country: Canada
- Branch: Royal Canadian Air Force
- Role: Strategic bombing (1942–1945), fighter-interceptor (1954–present)
- Part of: No. 6 Group RCAF (1943–1945), 3 Wing (1961–present)
- Home station: CFB Bagotville
- Nickname: Alouette Squadron
- Motto: Je te plumerai (French for 'I shall pluck you')
- Engagements: World War II; Kosovo War; Libyan Civil War
- Battle honours: English Channel and North Sea, 1942–1943; Fortress Europe, 1942–1944; France and Germany, 1944–1945; Biscay Ports, 1943–1944; Ruhr, 1942–1945; Berlin, 1944; German Ports, 1942–1945; Normandy, 1944; Rhine; Biscay, 1942–1943; Sicily, 1943; Italy, 1943; Salerno; Kosovo; Libya, 2011
- Website: www.canada.ca/en/air-force/corporate/squadrons/425-squadron.html

Insignia
- Badge: A lark volant wings elevated and adorned proper

Aircraft flown
- Bomber: Wellington (1942–1943); Halifax (1943–1945); Lancaster (1945)
- Fighter: CF-100 Canuck (1954–1961); CF-101 Voodoo (1961–1985); CF-18 Hornet (1985–present)

425 Tactical Fighter Squadron (French: 425^{e} Escadron d'appui tactique, also "Alouette" (English: skylark) Squadron, is a unit of the Royal Canadian Air Force. It operates CF-18 Hornet fighter jets from CFB Bagotville in Quebec, Canada. The squadron was originally formed during the Second World War. As of 2022, its Commanding Officer is Lieutenant Colonel Maxime "Piglet" Renaud.

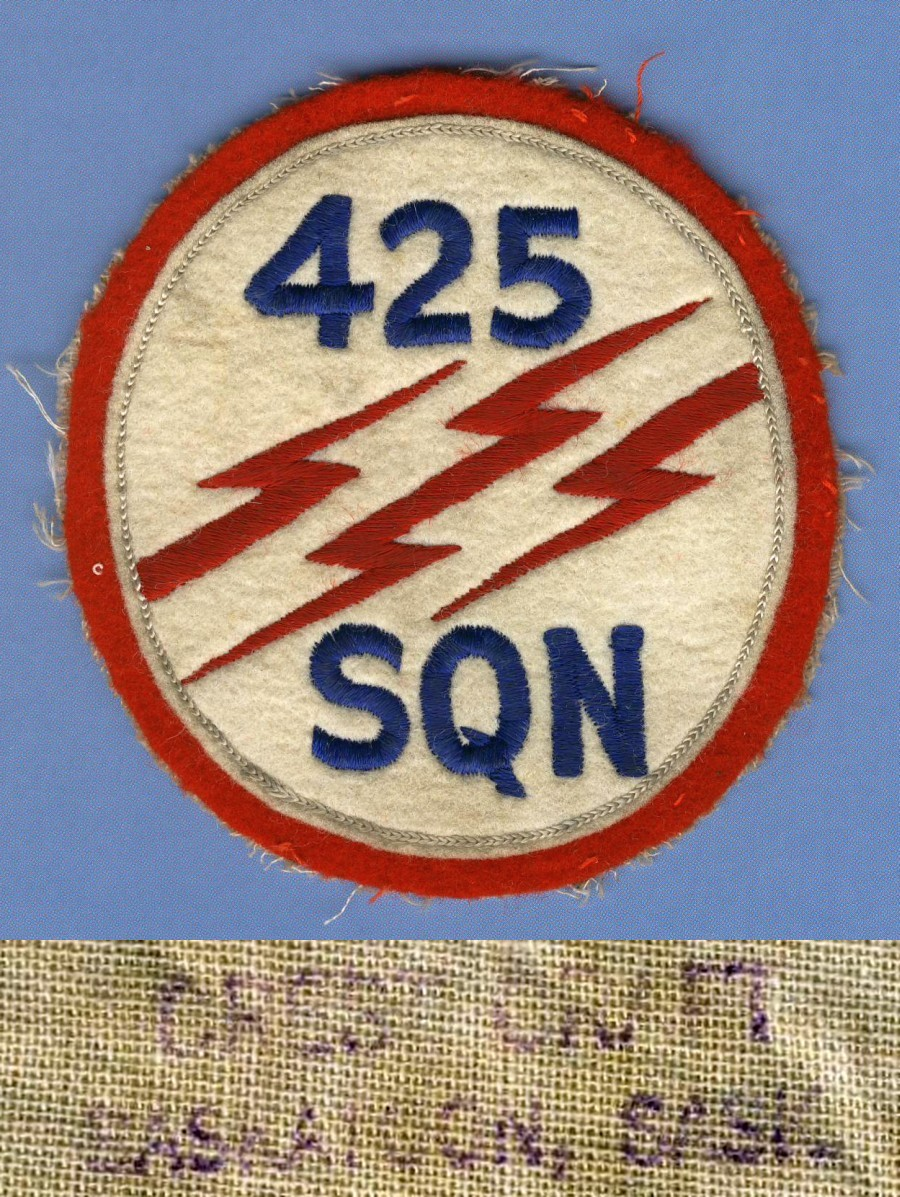
A Cold War, early-issue RCAF uniform patch for 425 Squadron manufactured by Crest Craft circa 1955

== History ==
425 Squadron, the first French Canadian squadron, was formed on 22 June 1942 at RAF Dishforth in Yorkshire, England, as a bomber unit flying Vickers Wellingtons. On the night of 5/6 October 1942, the squadron went into action for the first time, bombing Aachen with a small number of aircraft. In 1943, the squadron flew to Kairouan, Tunisia, and from there, it conducted operations against Italy and Sicily, returning to the UK in November of the same year. In December, they were re-equipped with Handley Page Halifaxes and flew their first mission with these aircraft in February 1944. Their final operation took place on 25 April 1945, when they bombed gun batteries on the tiny Frisian island of Wangerooge. Following the end of the war in Europe, in May 1945, 425 Squadron re-equipped again, this time with Avro Lancaster Mk X's. In June, they flew back to Canada to prepare for their role in Tiger Force for the continuing war against Japan. The use of atomic bombs precluded the need for Tiger Force, and 425 was disbanded on 5 September 1945 at RCAF Station Debert, less than three weeks after the Japanese surrender.

The squadron was reformed at RCAF Station St Hubert in October 1954, flying CF-100 Canucks as an all-weather fighter squadron. After re-equipping with the CF-101 Voodoo, 425 became the RCAF Operational Training Unit for this aircraft type at RCAF Station Namao in late 1961 before transferring to its current base at Bagotville, Quebec, and becoming a front-line squadron a few months later. From 1982, the Canadian Forces started to acquire CF-18 Hornets; 425 received them in 1985 and still flies them today. In 2005, 433 Squadron was merged into 425 Squadron. In 2008, the squadron was awarded its first battle honour since the Second World War for its part in Operation Allied Force.

A detachment of four CF-18 fighters from the squadron deployed to Romania, at the Mihail Kogălniceanu Air Base in March 2016 to participate in the Resilient Resolve exercise. For about a month, the 100 servicemen conducted bilateral training with the Romanian Air Force. The squadron was deployed to Romania previously, at Câmpia Turzii in 2014, as part of NATO's assurance measures in response to Russia's annexation of Crimea. In 2022, 425 Squadron was again deployed at Mihail Kogălniceanu to participate in NATO's enhanced Air Policing mission in the Black Sea region.

== Equipment ==
- Vickers Wellington
- Handley Page Halifax
- Avro Lancaster
- Avro Canada CF-100 Canuck
- McDonnell CF-101 Voodoo
- McDonnell Douglas CF-18 Hornet

== Affiliation ==
- 425 (Aldridge) Squadron, Air Training Corps.
