= 419 Tactical Fighter Training Squadron =

- 419^{e} Escadron d'entraînement à l'appui tactique (French)
- Active: 1941–1945; 1954–1962; 1977–1995; 2000–2024
- Country: Canada
- Branch: Royal Canadian Air Force
- Role: Tactical fighter training
- Part of: 15 Wing
- Garrison/HQ: CFB Cold Lake
- Motto: Moosa aswayita (Cree for 'Beware the moose')
- Battle honours: English Channel and North Sea, 1942–1944; Baltic, 1942–1944; Fortress Europe, 1942–1944; France and Germany, 1944–1945; Biscay Ports, 1942–1944; Ruhr, 1942–1945; Berlin, 1943–1944; German Ports, 1942–1945; Normandy, 1944; Rhine; Biscay, 1942, 1944
- Website: canada.ca/en/air-force/corporate/squadrons/419-squadron.html

Insignia
- Squadron badge: Argent a moose attacking proper

Aircraft flown
- Bomber: Wellington; Halifax; Lancaster
- Fighter: CF-100 Canuck
- Trainer: CF-5; CT-155 Hawk

419 Tactical Fighter Training Squadron (French: 419^{e} Escadron d'entraînement à l'appui tactique) was a unit of the Royal Canadian Air Force. The squadron was originally formed during the Second World War and was most recently based at CFB Cold Lake. In its latest incarnation it was responsible for advanced tactical fighter training for pilots of the RCAF and as part of the NATO Flying Training in Canada (NFTC) program using nine CT-155 Hawk trainers.

== History ==
=== Second World War ===
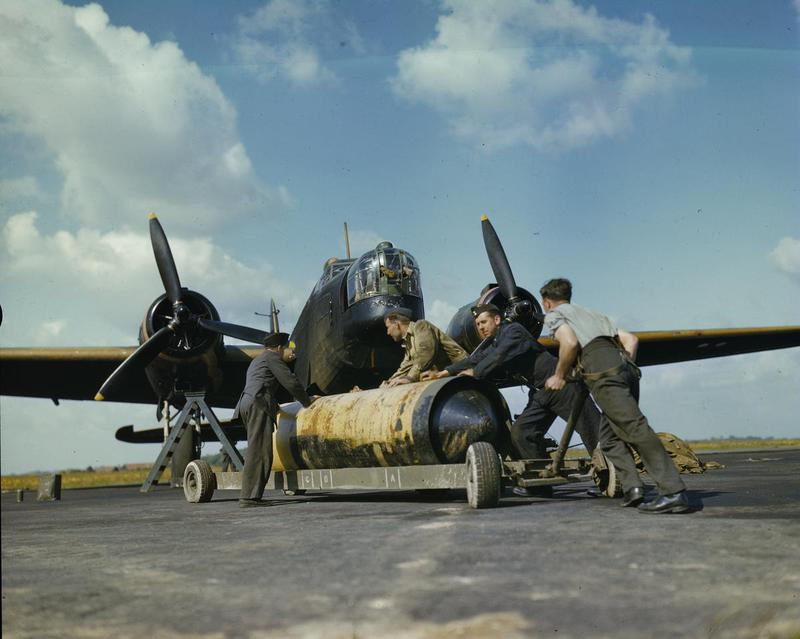
Loading a 4,000 lb "Cookie" on to a 419 Squadron Wellington at RAF Mildenhall, UK, May 1942

No. 419 Bomber Squadron formed at RAF Mildenhall, England in 1941 as part of No. 3 Group, Bomber Command. The squadron moved to RAF Middleton St. George when it became a constituent of 6 Group, Bomber Command, and remained in England until 1945. The squadron operated Vickers Wellington, then Handley Page Halifax and finally Avro Lancaster bombers during this period. It was the third RCAF bomber unit to be formed in England. It started operations in January 1942, converting almost immediately to Wellington Mk IIIs and moving north to Leeming as part of the new 6 Group in August 1942. Here in November it was re-equipped with Halifax Mk IIs, which it flew for the next 18 months on the night offensive against Germany. After three quick moves it settled at Middleton St. George in November and stayed there for the rest of its service in Bomber Command. In April 1944 the squadron began to convert to Avro Lancasters, using the Mk X which was produced in Canada and flown across the Atlantic. The squadron remained continuously on the offensive until 25 April 1945, when it flew its last sortie. Squadron personnel flew a total of 4,325 operational sorties during the war from Mannheim to Nuremberg, Milan to Berlin and Munich to Hanover, inflicting heavy damage on the enemy. As a result of its wartime record, 419 Squadron became one of the most decorated units under the RCAF during the war. Over a span of roughly three-and-a-quarter years it logged 400 operational missions (342 bombing missions, 53 mining excursions, 3 leaflet raids and 1 "spoof") involving 4,325 sorties. One hundred and twenty nine aircraft were lost on these operations.

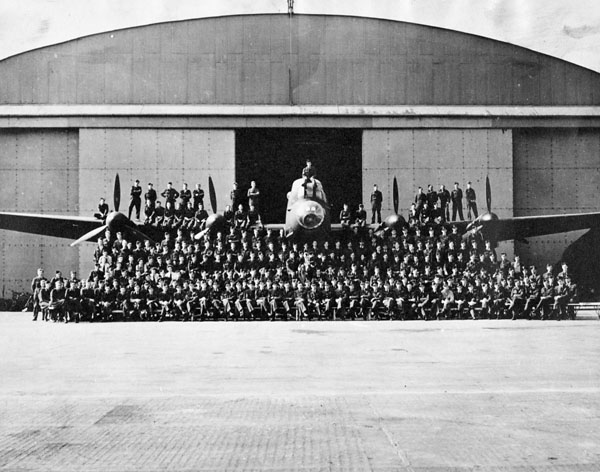
Personnel of No. 419 (Moose) Squadron, RCAF, with an Avro Lancaster B.X aircraft, Middleton St. George, England, 1944

Between January 1943 to March 1944, 419 Squadron was involved in over 200 sorties involving 2400 crewing operations losing 59 aircraft, a rate of one in every 40. 415 men were either killed or taken POW during those 15 months, averaging 4 crews a month. The average crew survival rate was between 2 and 3 months when about 20 missions would be flown. In general mining operations were relatively safer missions. In particular the attacks on German cities intensified from early October when more than 100 crews were regularly dispatched to bomb Frankfurt, Mannheim, Berlin, Magdeburg, Leipzig and Nuremberg. During March 1944 there was much mining as described earlier, but this was the precursor to 6 Group's 118-crew attack on Nuremberg at the end of the month when it was to suffer its worst loss of thirteen aircraft in a single sortie.

It has not been possible to trace all of 419's downed aircraft (for example Sergeant Robert Whitfield's Halifax Mk. II JD-258 coded VR-K borrowed from 419 Squadron for an operation to Wuppertal on 24/25 June 1943 was intercepted by a night fighter, Hans-Dieter Frank, and crashed near Eindhoven killing the crew which included two RCAF personnel). so the statistics will be a little worse than described above.

No. 419 Squadron was, like other squadrons in 6 Group, heavily involved in much activity during this month, probably the most active in the run up to the June landings. Rail-yards were successfully attacked at Trappes (6/7), Le Mans (13/14), Amiens (16/17), Laon (23/24), Aulnoye (25/26), Courtrai (26/27) and Vaires-sur-Marne (29/30) as well as mining operations in the Gironde Estuary (3/4), Brest (4/5), Lorient, Brest, St Nazaire, Terchelling Islands (11/12), Heligoland (18/19 and 30/31) and Kiel Bay (22/23). An aircraft factory at Meulan Les Mureaux was bombed on 2/3 March.

On the 17th june of 1944 a Lancaster bomber of the 419 squadron crashed in Zeist after being shot down returning from its mission. Five of the seven crew members were killed. April 2025 memorial stones were placed in memory of the crew.

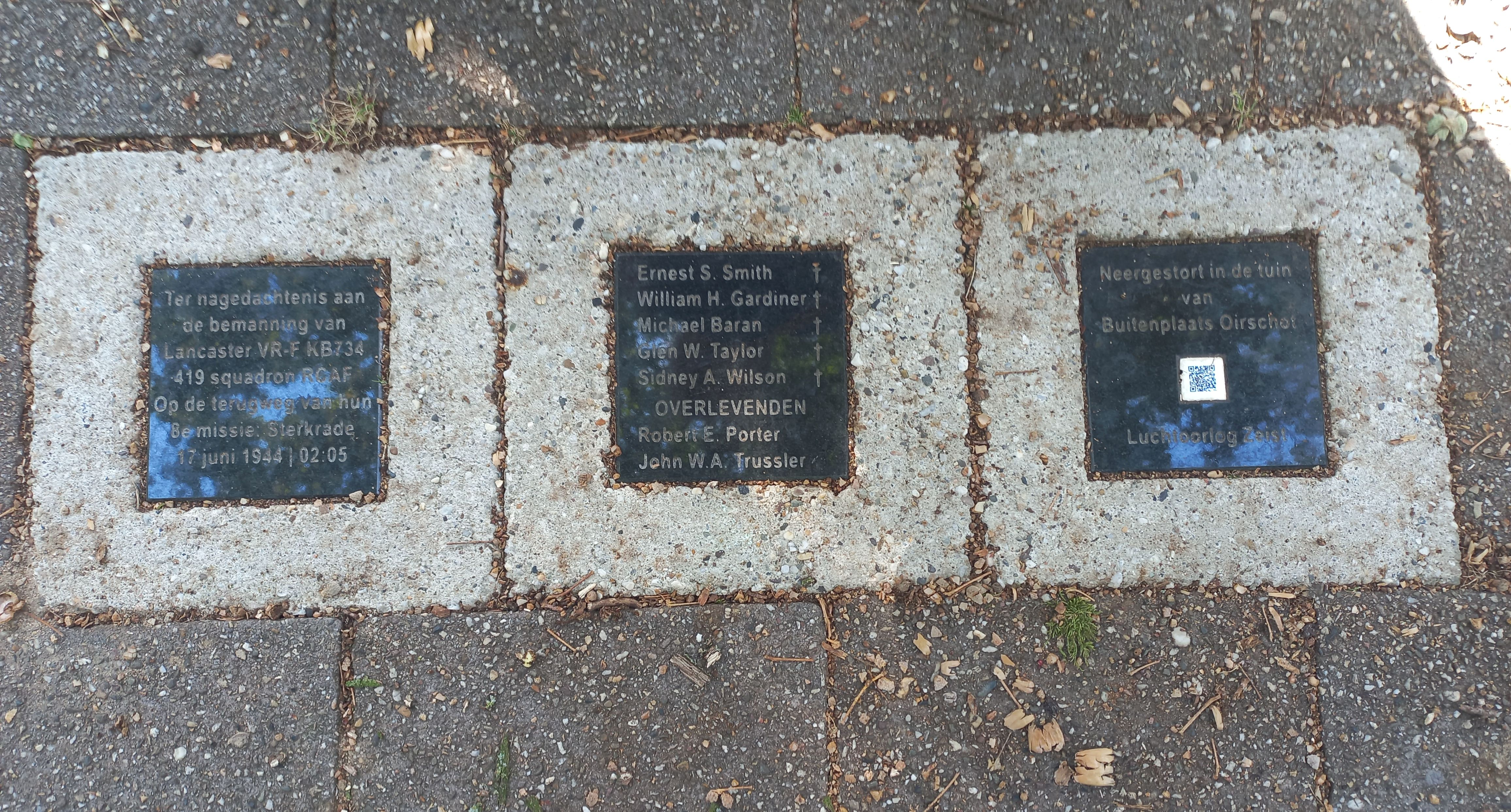
Memorial stone for the crash of a Lancaster bomber in Zeist the Netherlands on 17-06-1944

It flew back to Canada in June 1945 and was disbanded at Yarmouth Airport in Yarmouth, Nova Scotia, on 5 September 1945.

=== Postwar ===
419 was re-formed on 15 March 1955 as 419 All-Weather Fighter Squadron, and moved to the NATO Air Division base at Baden-Soellingen, Germany shortly thereafter. The squadron was equipped with the Avro CF-100 Canuck. 419 was disbanded 31 December 1962.

The unit was re-formed at CFB Cold Lake on 2 May 1975 as 419 Tactical Fighter Training Squadron. It was disbanded in 1995 when the CF-5 aircraft were retired.

The squadron was re-formed again at 4 Wing Cold Lake on 23 July 2000 to conduct advanced lead-in fighter training for Canadian and NATO pilots using nine CT-155 Hawk aircraft.

419 Squadron was placed on hiatus on 8 March 2024, as the RCAF transferred to an interim lead-in fighter training program with the Euro-NATO Joint Jet Pilot Training Program at Sheppard Air Force Base in Texas, and other fighter lead-in training programs in Finland and at Italy’s International Flight Training School. This hiatus marked the end of RCAF operation of the CT-155 Hawk. The RCAF intends to reactivate 419 Squadron in the early 2030s with a new future fifth-generation trainer aircraft.

== Notable members ==
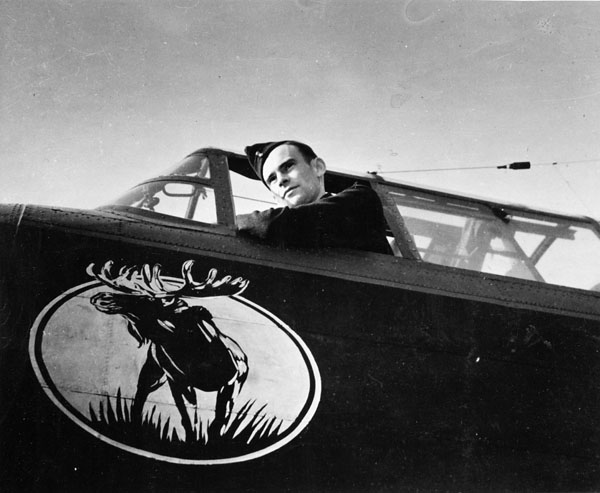
W/C D.C. Hagerman, Commanding Officer of No. 419 Squadron, RCAF, in the cockpit of an Avro Lancaster B.X aircraft, England, 1944

The name Moose, which is used in the squadron's emblem and motto, is derived from the nickname of the first commanding officer of the squadron, Wing Commander "Moose" Fulton. The tradition of squadron commanders bearing the nickname "Moose" was instituted after Fulton's death during operations. Squadron personnel are affectionately known as "moosemen". This tradition continues to this day.

Pilot Officer Andrew Charles Mynarski of 419 Squadron was posthumously awarded the Victoria Cross for his actions on 12/13 June 1944 during a bombing mission over Europe. A restored Lancaster operated by the Canadian Warplane Heritage Museum in Hamilton, Ontario, is painted in the markings of aircraft KB 726 VR-A of 419 Squadron in his honour. This is one of only two Lancasters still in flying condition; the other is part of the Battle of Britain Memorial Flight.

As well as Mynarski's Victoria Cross members of the squadron have been awarded 4 Distinguished Service Orders, 150 Distinguished Flying Crosses, 3 bars to DFCs, 35 Distinguished Flying Medals and 1 Military Cross.

More recently, then Captain (now Lieutenant-Colonel) Riel "Guns" Erickson, who starred in Jetstream while a CF-18 Hornet student in 410 Tactical Fighter Operational Training Squadron, was a 419 Squadron instructor.
