= List of Vickers Wellington operators =

Operators of British medium bomber

The Vickers Wellington is a British twin-engined, long-range medium bomber aircraft that was produced from 1936 to 1945 and used throughout World War II. It was operated by a number of nations and service branches around the world.

== Operators ==
=== Australia ===
Royal Australian Air Force

- No. 458 Squadron RAAF Code letters "FU"
- No. 460 Squadron RAAF Code letters "UV" and "AR"
- No. 466 Squadron RAAF Code letters "HD"

=== Canada ===
Royal Canadian Air Force

- No. 405 Squadron RCAF 'Vancouver Squadron' Code letters "LQ"
- No. 407 Squadron RCAF Code Letters "RR"
- No. 415 Squadron RCAF Code Letters "6U"
- No. 419 Squadron RCAF 'Moose Squadron' Code letters "VR"
- No. 420 Squadron RCAF 'Snowy Owl Squadron' Code letters "PT"
- No. 424 Squadron RCAF 'Tiger Squadron' Code letters "QB"
- No. 425 Squadron RCAF 'Alouette Squadron' Code letters "KW"
- No. 426 Squadron RCAF 'Thunderbird Squadron' Code letters "OW"
- No. 427 Squadron RCAF 'Lion Squadron' Code letters "ZL"
- No. 428 Squadron RCAF 'Ghost Squadron' Code letters "NA"
- No. 429 Squadron RCAF 'Bison Squadron' Code letters "AL"
- No. 431 Squadron RCAF Code Letters "SE"
- No. 432 Squadron RCAF 'Leaside Squadron' Code letters "QO"

=== Czechoslovakia ===
Czechoslovak Air Force in exile in Great Britain

- No. 311 (Czechoslovak) Squadron Code letters "KX"

=== Free France ===
Free French Air Force

- No. 326 Squadron RAF
- No. 344 Squadron RAF

=== France ===
Aéronavale

- Flottille 2.F (earlier No. 344 Squadron RAF) operated Wellingtons between 1945 and 1952.
- Escadrille 55.S operated Wellingtons between 1948 and 1952.

=== Nazi Germany ===
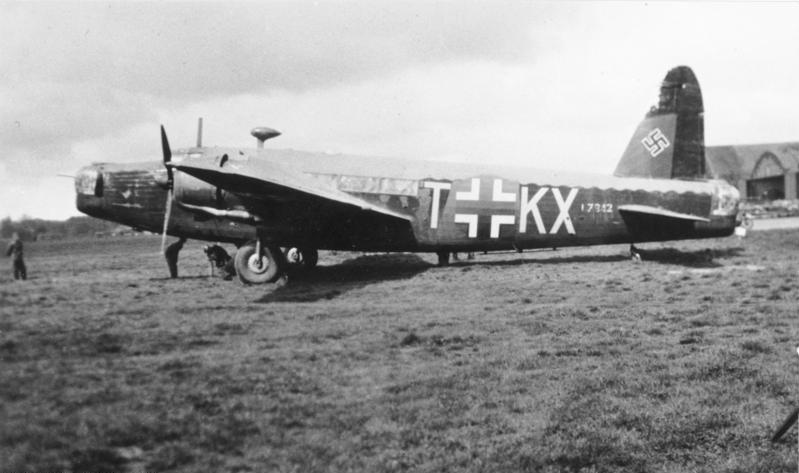
A captured Vickers Wellington Mk.IC (RAF serial L7842) in service with the German Luftwaffe, probably at the test center at Rechlin, circa 1941. L7842 was delivered in mid-1940. It was lost on 6 February 1941 while in service with No. 311 Squadron, RAF, while on a mission to Boulogne (France).

Luftwaffe

- 2./Versuchsverband OKL operated a few captured aircraft.

=== Greece ===
Hellenic Air Force

- No. 13 Squadron RHAF
- No. 355 Squadron RHAF operated Wellingtons after WW2, mainly for transport duties.

=== New Zealand ===
RNZAF received 30 Wellington Mark I's before WW2, the first 18 of which were training with the RAF when in August 1939 they were loaned, together with aircrew, to the UK, forming the unit which later became No. 75 Squadron RNZAF.

Royal New Zealand Air Force

- No. 75 Squadron RNZAF, Code letters "AA", "JN"

=== Poland ===
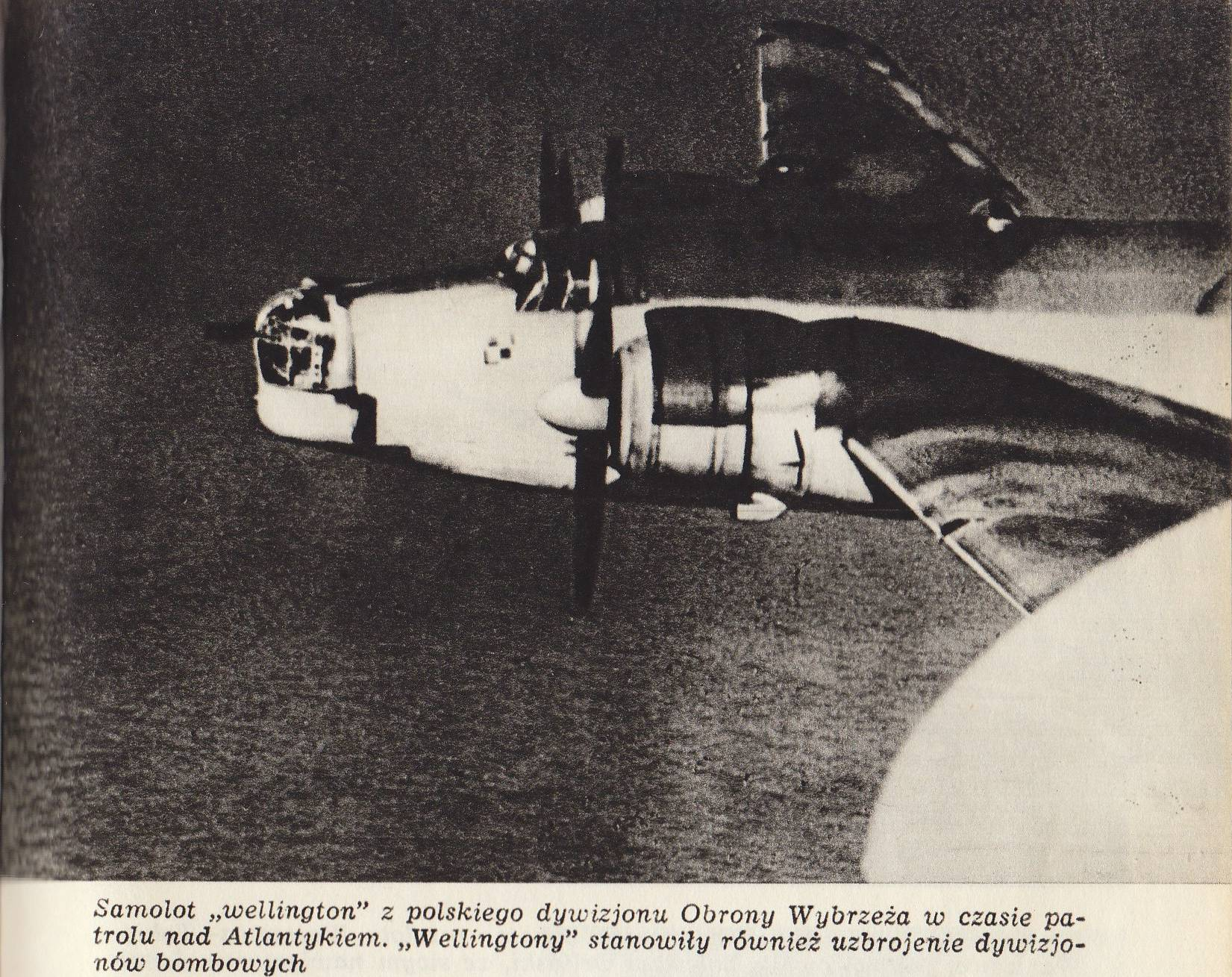
RAF Coastal Command aircraft Vickers Wellington of one of Polish Squadrons

Polish Air Forces in exile in Great Britain

- No. 300 Polish Bomber Squadron "Land of Masovia" Code letters "BH"
- No. 301 Polish Bomber Squadron "Land of Pomerania" Code letters "GR"
- No. 304 Polish Bomber Squadron "Land of Silesia" Code letters "NZ" and "2"
- No. 305 Polish Bomber Squadron "Land of Greater Poland" Squadron Code "SM"

=== Portugal ===
Portuguese Air Force

- One Vickers Wellington was interned in Portugal during World War II.

=== South Africa ===
South African Air Force

- 17 Squadron SAAF
- 26 Squadron SAAF
- 28 Squadron SAAF

=== United Kingdom ===
Royal Air Force

- No. 7 Squadron RAF ?
- No. 8 Squadron RAF
- No. 9 Squadron RAF
- No. 12 Squadron RAF
- No. 14 Squadron RAF
- No. 15 Squadron RAF
- No. 24 Squadron RAF
- No. 36 Squadron RAF
- No. 37 Squadron RAF
- No. 38 Squadron RAF
- No. 39 Squadron RAF ?
- No. 40 Squadron RAF
- No. 57 Squadron RAF
- No. 69 Squadron RAF
- No. 70 Squadron RAF
- No. 75 (NZ) Squadron RAF Code letters "AA"
- No. 93 Squadron RAF
- No. 99 (Madras Presidency) Squadron RAF
- No. 101 Squadron RAF
- No. 103 Squadron RAF
- No. 104 Squadron RAF
- No. 108 Squadron RAF
- No. 109 Squadron RAF
- No. 115 Squadron RAF
- No. 138 Squadron RAF
- No. 142 Squadron RAF
- No. 148 Squadron RAF
- No. 149 Squadron RAF
- No. 150 Squadron RAF
- No. 156 Squadron RAF
- No. 158 Squadron RAF 1942 only
- No. 161 Squadron RAF
- No. 162 Squadron RAF
- No. 166 Squadron RAF
- No. 172 Squadron RAF
- No. 179 Squadron RAF
- No. 192 Squadron RAF
- No. 196 Squadron RAF Code letters "ZO"
- No. 199 Squadron RAF
- No. 203 Squadron RAF
- No. 214 Squadron RAF
- No. 215 Squadron RAF
- No. 218 Squadron RAF
- No. 221 Squadron RAF
- No. 232 Squadron RAF
- No. 242 Squadron RAF
- No. 244 Squadron RAF
- No. 281 Squadron RAF
- No. 294 Squadron RAF
- No. 524 Squadron RAF
- No. 527 Squadron RAF
- No. 544 Squadron RAF
- No. 547 Squadron RAF
- No. 612 Squadron RAF
- No. 621 Squadron RAF
- No. 1 (Coastal) Operational Training Unit RAF
- No. 3 (Coastal) Operational Training Unit RAF
- No. 5 (Coastal) Operational Training Unit RAF
- No. 6 (Coastal) Operational Training Unit RAF
- No. 7 (Coastal) Operational Training Unit RAF
- No. 10 Operational Training Unit RAF
- No. 11 Operational Training Unit RAF
- No. 12 Operational Training Unit RAF
- No. 14 Operational Training Unit RAF
- No. 15 Operational Training Unit RAF
- No. 16 Operational Training Unit RAF
- No. 17 Operational Training Unit RAF
- No. 18 Operational Training Unit RAF
- No. 19 Operational Training Unit RAF
- No. 20 Operational Training Unit RAF
- No. 21 Operational Training Unit RAF
- No. 22 Operational Training Unit RAF
- No. 23 Operational Training Unit RAF
- No. 24 Operational Training Unit RAF
- No. 25 Operational Training Unit RAF
- No. 26 Operational Training Unit RAF
- No. 27 Operational Training Unit RAF
- No. 28 Operational Training Unit RAF
- No. 29 Operational Training Unit RAF
- No. 30 Operational Training Unit RAF
- No. 51 Operational Training Unit RAF
- No. 54 Operational Training Unit RAF
- No. 62 Operational Training Unit RAF
- No. 63 Operational Training Unit RAF
- No. 76 Operational Training Unit RAF
- No. 77 Operational Training Unit RAF
- No. 78 Operational Training Unit RAF
- No. 81 Operational Training Unit RAF
- No. 82 Operational Training Unit RAF
- No. 83 Operational Training Unit RAF
- No. 84 Operational Training Unit RAF
- No. 86 Operational Training Unit RAF
- No. 86 Operational Training Unit RAF
- No. 104 Operational Training Unit RAF
- No. 105 Operational Training Unit RAF
- No. 111 Operational Training Unit RAF

Fleet Air Arm

- 716 Naval Air Squadron
- 728 Naval Air Squadron
- 736 Naval Air Squadron
- 758 Naval Air Squadron
- 762 Naval Air Squadron
- 765 Naval Air Squadron
- 783 Naval Air Squadron
