= Vickers Wellington LN514 =

1943 British bomber; propaganda effort

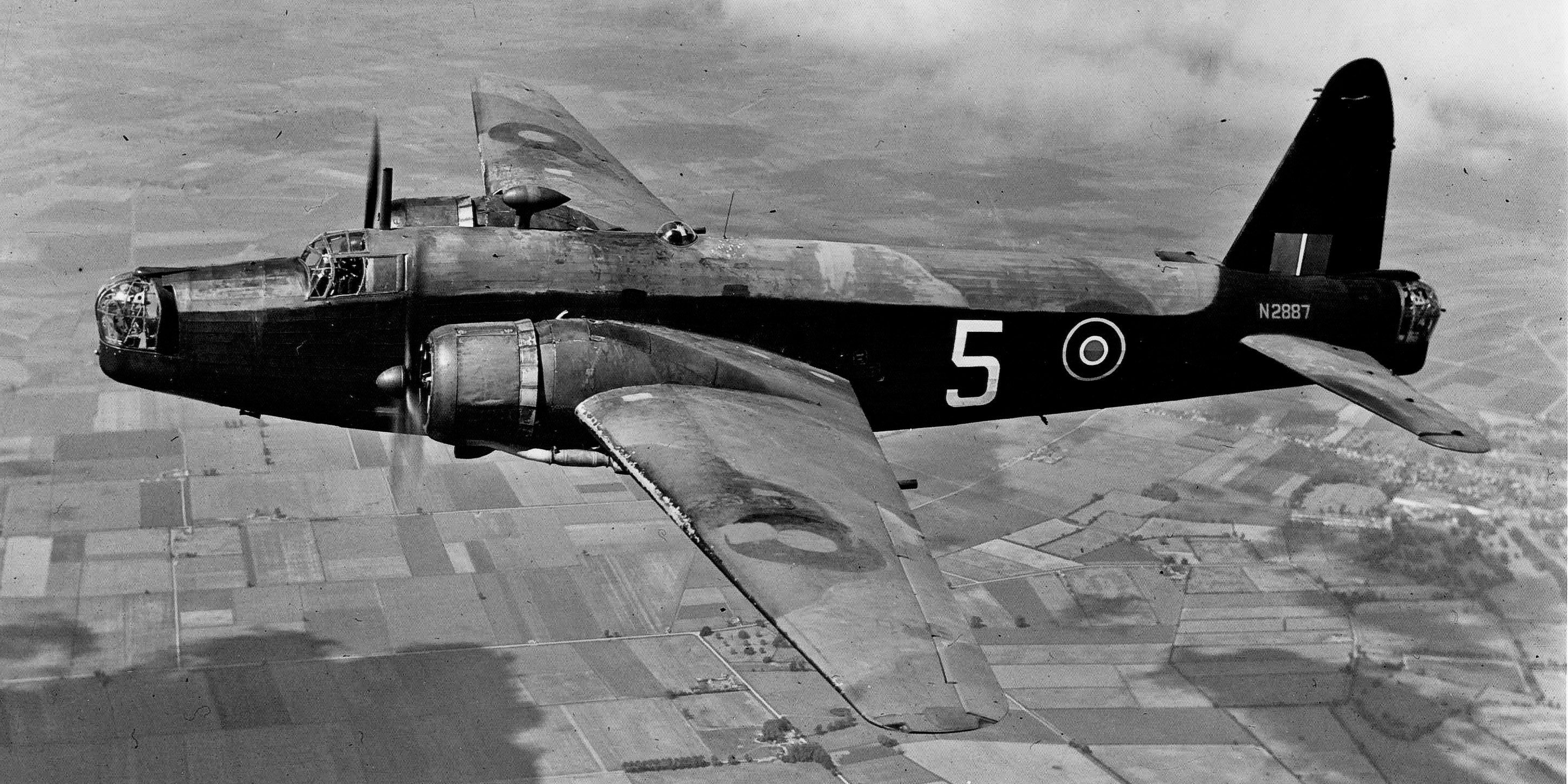
- A Wellington bomber similar to LN514

General information
- Type: Medium Bomber
- Manufacturer: Vickers-Armstrong
- Owners: Royal Air Force
- Serial: LN514

History
- Manufactured: early summer 1943
- First flight: early summer 1943
- Fate: Unknown, probably scrapped in 1948.

Vickers Wellington LN514 was a Vickers Wellington bomber built in 1943 in record time, as part of a British propaganda effort during the Second World War.

The bomber was constructed in 23 hours and 50 minutes, and took off 24 hours and 48 minutes after the first parts of the airframe had been laid down, beating the previous record of 48 hours set by an American factory. It was constructed at the Vickers-Armstrongs factory in Broughton, Flintshire. The record attempt was the idea of the government to bolster morale at home and send a message abroad that British wartime manufacturing capacity was unaffected by German bombing.

The Ministry of Information produced the newsreel Worker's Week-End using film of the attempt, detailing the construction process from the beginning to first flight, emphasising the vital role of women in the workforce on the "factory front". It was distributed both at home and in America, deliberately using a Royal Canadian Air Force officer as narrator.

As part of the BBC television's Battle of Britain 70th anniversary season, the record attempt was the subject of a one-hour documentary film Wellington Bomber. Bringing together some of the workers who were originally involved, it examined the effort through their eyes, and together with historian Max Hastings and Rupert "Tiny" Cooling, a former Wellington pilot, examined the bomber and the wider historical context. It was first broadcast on BBC Four on 14 September 2010.

== Background ==
=== Wellington bomber ===
The 26.25 metres (86.1 ft) wingspan Vickers Wellington bomber was designed by Rex Pierson and made by the Vickers-Armstrongs company. It was named after Arthur Wellesley, 1st Duke of Wellington. A total of 11,461 were built during the war, more than any other British aircraft except the Supermarine Spitfire and Hawker Hurricane, which were smaller, single-engine aircraft.

With its geodetic aluminium skeleton airframe construction covered by a varnished linen fabric skin, it was said to be held in great regard by aircrews and pilots for its durability and resistance to damage, able to survive long enough to return home, even if one engine failed.

The aircraft's fabric construction and a frame that simply slotted together, like the children's toy Meccano, meant that it was easy to assemble, making it a perfect choice for the construction record attempt.

The Wellington was a mainstay of the British air fleet during World War II, used throughout the conflict, first for RAF Bomber Command as a strike bomber during the 1940 Battle of Britain and beyond, and after being superseded by the larger Halifax and Lancaster, for RAF Coastal Command in the anti-shipping role from 1943. Two Wellington bombers have survived to the present; the one recovered from Loch Ness is on display at Brooklands Museum Weybridge, Surrey.

=== Propaganda ===
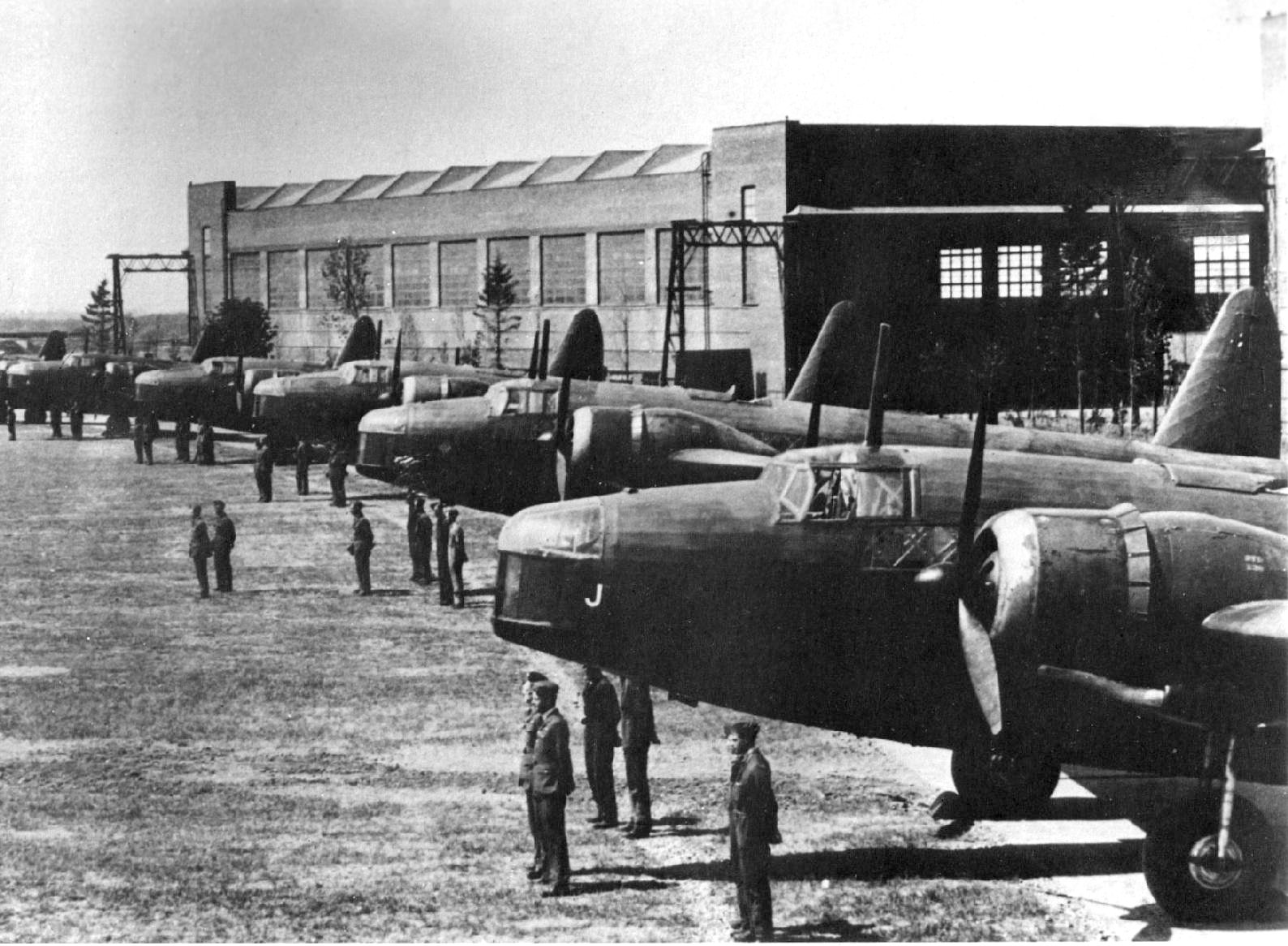
Wellington bombers at RAF Stradishall in 1939, ready to fly to Brussels and Paris as a show of strength from the RAF

With the Broughton factory being run by the Ministry of Aircraft Production, 6,000 people, over half of them women used in place of the men sent to fight, worked 12-hour shifts to make 28 Wellington bombers a week at peak production.

Propaganda films were a significant part of the British war effort, often examining the 'factory front' which was crucial to the real front, paying tribute to the dedication and skill of the workers, encouraging new workers to volunteer, and keeping up morale of those already working and of the wider population. The propaganda newsreel Worker's Week-End showing the construction of the Wellington bomber was made in 1943, at the height of the British bombing efforts against Germany. With speed and morale in aircraft production now an important part of sustaining that effort, the Ministry of War together with the RAF came up with the idea of a construction record attempt, and filming it for a Ministry of Information propaganda newsreel. It was to be both a tribute to the workers of the British aircraft industry, and a way for the Ministry of War to demonstrate to the world the spirit and efficiency still evident in wartime aircraft production, despite heavy German bombardment.

In particular, the movie was to be shown in America, with an American-sounding narrator deliberately chosen, to show that Britain had not been beaten by The Blitz, the sustained German bombing of 1940-1941, and was now holding its own in production efforts. In a show of competitiveness, breaking the record held by the Americans was also seen as 'one in the eye for' the Americans' comparatively late entry into the fight.

Other propaganda films of the period focussing on factory production include the one-off newsreels Night Shift (1942), Clyde-built (1943), Coalminer (1943), and A Date with a Tank (1944), and the series Worker and Warfront (1942–1946) and War Work News (1942–1945). These are now preserved in the Imperial War Museum.

== Record attempt ==
The aim of the record attempt was to build an operational Wellington bomber from scratch against the clock, "from first bolt to take-off" The record was at the time held by the Americans, having achieved the feat in 48 hours in a bomber factory in California.

The newsreel records that the bomber's wheels lifted from the ground 24 hours and 48 minutes after construction began. The 2010 documentary also states the build time after the first part of the airframe had been laid was "ten minutes less than 24 hours", and the take-off took place 24 hours and 48 minutes later. Some sources state the assembly time was 23 hours and 48 minutes.

The target time set by the workers was to assemble it in 30 hours or less, with a test pilot scheduled for an afternoon flight. However, assembly moved so fast that the pilot had to be roused from his bed to make the flight.

The bomber was constructed over a weekend, starting on a Saturday morning. The workers donated their free time for the attempt, donating their bonus money to the Red Cross Aid to Russia Fund.

The date of the construction is not known; it was probably early summer 1943 (based on National Archives records) or early autumn (the 2010 documentary asserts it was one autumn weekend). October 1943 was the newsreel's release date according to the National Archives, or the production date according to Imperial War Museum records. The newsreel's narrator states that the record attempt took place "not so long ago".

The bomber airframe used for the record attempt was serial number LN514. According to the Imperial War Museum record, the newsreel "stresses throughout that standards were not lowered for faster speed".

== Worker's Week-End newsreel ==
Worker's Week-End ^{note 1}
- Directed by: Elton Ray
- Produced by: John Monck
- Starring: Wellington bomber LN514; Vickers aircraft factory workers in Broughton, Flintshire
- Narrated by: Flying Officer J. Peach, Royal Canadian Air Force^{note 3}
- Production company: Crown Film Unit
- Distributed by: Ministry of Information
- Release date: October 1943 (United Kingdom)
- Running time: Approx. 12 minutes^{note 2}
- Country: United Kingdom
- Language: English

Worker's Week-End^{note 1} was the propaganda newsreel that resulted from the construction effort.

=== Production ===
The reel was produced by the Crown Film Unit and financed by the Ministry of Information. Filmed at the Vickers-Armstrongs factory in Broughton, Flintshire, it was directed by Ray Elton and produced by John Monck. The reel was filmed in black and white on 2 reels of 35mm film (P 1/35/N). It was later also transferred to VHS. The narrator was Flying Officer J. Peach of the Royal Canadian Air Force.^{note 3}

=== Format ===
The newsreel's picture closely followed the Wellington bomber and its construction, interspersed with small periods of the wider scene. The audio consisted of the narration, factory background sounds, and the plane's sound on takeoff. The narration focuses on the people involved until the main parts come together, after which it describes more of the production process.

As well as the construction process, early on in the reel just after the flap testing is shown, chief cameraman Chick Fowl and his camera are briefly shown as they film the workers. In addition to simply describing the process and the workers, the narrator relates a couple of anecdotes during the reel - as the electrical work begins, and during the shot of the cockpit exterior and interior work. He indicates that the company test pilot Gerald Whinney, who "stood next to me" (but not shown), said that the electrical fitters were "like a lot of bloody ants, hope they don't forget anything". He also describes how he had noticed the girl working on the exterior of the cockpit, Ivy Bennett, because she was wearing a pink chiffon blouse, because she had come back from a party to help out in the attempt.

=== Assembly depiction ===
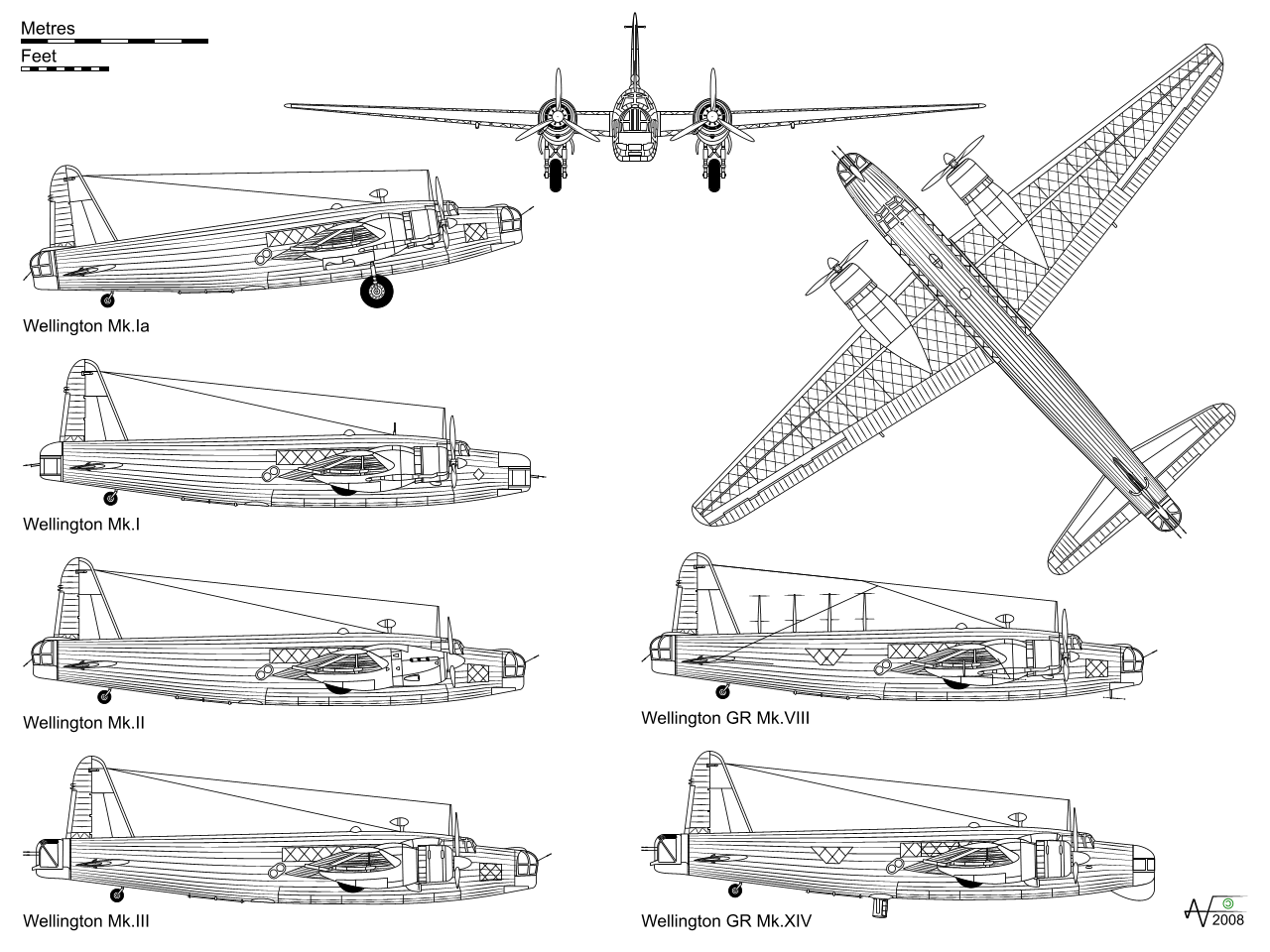
Wellington bomber Mk1 to Mk14 outline schematics

The newsreel begins by showing a tractor opening the factory door, and with the workers arriving. The construction is seen beginning with the first fuselage pieces being assembled on jigs, as well as the work being inspected. The film moves on to show wing assembly and inspection, and the making of the cabin heater. Returning to the fuselage, it shows the fitting of the wooden floor and a bulkhead frame, moving on to the fitting of the cockpit floor, seat and control column, installed as one part. Moving away from the fuselage, the flaps are shown being tested and the ailerons being assembled. Returning to the fuselage, workers begin fitting the electrical wiring and systems. After more detailed scenes of its assembly, the completed fuselage is shown being removed from the jig.

The film then shows the bolting and stitching of the covering fabric to the wings and other large control surface frames, described as the "4 great sections" of the aircraft. After showing the assembly of the tail end of the fuselage frame, the covering of this and the main fuselage is also shown. While the covering is being completed, the weatherproofing of the finished parts with resin (dope), is seen beginning. An overhead crane brings an engine to be fitted to the rest of the power nacelle, referred to as the 'egg', followed by more scenes of engine assembly. The film then shows all the major parts being moved to a main assembly area, including moving the whole fuselage. A crane moves the 'power eggs' into position, and then the tail and elevators are fitted to the fuselage.

The bomb bay beam and the fuel tanks are installed, then a crane fits the wings to the fuselage, and propellers to the engines. After a general scene of the construction, the crane lifts the rear gun turret into place, followed by a shot of the main undercarriage and wheel being moved into the raised position. After a general scene of the cockpit being worked on simultaneously inside and out, the fitting of the inner fuel tank is shown, followed by another wide shot of the general scene at the front of the bomber. A close-up of the Royal Air Force roundel being hand-painted onto the fuselage is followed by a scene of the tailwheel being inspected.

The bomber is towed to the running shed at the end of the factory, the location for final inspection and engine testing. All the assembled workers are shown watching as the engines are started for the first time, for which the factory door is opened. After a shot of the front gun turret being tested for movement, the completed bomber is towed out of the factory tail-first, as a worker cleans the cockpit windows. With the assembled workers watching, the test pilot enters the aircraft, taxies into position, and lifts off for its first test flight.

=== Timing depiction ===
During the film the narrator relates how the attempt is doing for time. At the beginning he says the aim was for completion in under 30 hours, and that work started at 9 a.m.. At 1:45 p.m. the fuselage leaves the jig with electrics fitted. At 6:15 p.m. the main parts are coming together. With the change in shifts also noted, the propeller fitting occurs at 8:23 p.m. It's noted the workers are now making bets as to whether they will beat the 30-hour target. The landing gear is on the aircraft by 10:30 p.m. By 3:20 a.m. the next morning the aircraft is being towed to the running shed. The engines are started for the first time at 6:15 a.m., or 21:15 hrs since construction began. He then relates how the attempt is delayed at this stage for 2 hours of "snagging" (last-minute rectifications). At 8:50 a.m. (the 23:50 hr mark), the completed bomber is wheeled out of the factory door. As the Wellington takes off, he states "its wheels lifted from the ground, in exactly 24 hours and 48 minutes." The newsreel ends with a note, 'P.S. At 7:45 p.m. this bomber was flown by a ferry pilot to its operational base.'

The workers named in the film are predominantly women doing a variety of jobs including assembly and testing. As workers are named by the narrator, he also relates many of their previous occupations.

=== Analysis ===
According to the Imperial War Museum, the newsreel "provides quite good coverage of various processes in construction" describing it as a "good film well put together: right atmosphere of dedication, efficiency, speed".

== Wellington Bomber documentary ==
Wellington Bomber is a 2010 television documentary film about the record attempt and accompanying newsreel.

The 1 hour documentary was commissioned by the BBC's digital channel BBC Four and produced by Peter Williams' company Peter Williams Television, with Williams and Cassian Harrison of the BBC acting as executive producers. Williams directed the programme, assisted by Stephen Hopkins and Jo Taylor, with Paul Meadows as editor. Having tracked down workers who originally worked on the record attempt, according to the BBC "Their story of the excitement of the attempt is the heart of this documentary."

The programme formed part of the BBC's Battle Of Britain season, marking the 70th anniversary of the battle with special programmes across BBC One, BBC Two and BBC Four. It was first broadcast on BBC Four at 8 p.m. on Tuesday, 14 September 2010, and then at 7:30 p.m. on BBC Two on Sunday 19 September.

=== Participants ===
The documentary featured a number of original Broughton workers and their descendants as well as the author and historian Max Hastings who had written Bomber Command (described by the narrator as a "definitive work" on RAF Bomber Command). Of the workers two had appeared in the original newsreel. An RAF Wellington pilot also contributed.

=== Format ===
The location for the documentary film is an evening at the Broughton factory, where several of the original workers and their relatives have met to view a screening of the original newsreel in a small cinema room. Eleven of the original workers and their relatives were interviewed in the documentary, while the visible group present at the cinema numbered at least 30. It is stated that the screening was the first time many of them had seen the newsreel.

The documentary featured narrated archive footage and pictures interwoven with shots of the original newsreel being screened and of parts of the newsreel itself, supplemented with interviews with the workers and their relatives, pre-recorded in their homes. In addition, there is a large amount of interview material interwoven with this, from both Cooling and Hastings. Cooling is also interviewed in a home setting, while Hastings is interviewed at the Brooklands Museum in Surrey, site of another wartime Wellington factory, inside one of only two preserved Wellington bombers, N2980.

=== Content ===
The film covered the design of the bomber by Barnes Wallis and the background behind its urgent operational need and thus necessity of easy and quick manufacture. Brooklands Museum's Wellington N2980 is covered in detail. The film discussed the Wellington in service, the daily lives and roles of the bomber crews, with Hastings telling how pilots named the bomber "The Wimpy" after the contemporary cartoon character J. Wellington Wimpy. It had a resilience to flak and could ride out trouble, albeit Hastings said that aircrews were still more likely to die than survive a 30-mission tour. Cooling told how his first flight returned with petrol leaking out of a fuel tank, with the pilot simply remarking they were 'back in time for last orders'; the crew were flying again within two days.

The film covered the Broughton factory, a shadow factory which built many of the 11,461 Wellington bombers built. Its production line, its aircraft hangar, its assembly lines, parts storage systems and component assembly hangars, and the processes of stitching and doping, were shown. It discussed the production line organisation, and that some assembly work such as electrical panels had actually been prepared beforehand for the record attempt. The film covered air raids on the factory and the measures taken to prevent injury or damage, including a system of amber and red warning lights, and the illumination of nearby hills to fool German bombers. With all regular forces committed in theatre, security at the factory was provided by the Home Guard, who also escorted workers as they undertook snagging work to finished aircraft on the neighbouring fields into which they were distributed with wide spacings.

It covered the role of women at the factory, who made up half the workforce, and why they were mobilised to work though many had no experience of such work but were soon training new workers themselves, and how most were motivated by having male relatives involved in the fighting. It described the general patriotic feeling and productive urge felt among workers, in light of German bombing and propaganda efforts, such as the 1940 broadcasts of Lord Haw Haw. By contrast, it also discussed the problems of instances of low morale, absenteeism, death, and the effect of industrial relations movements since the 1926 general strike, and the Labour Acts used to bring in Scottish workers. Dance music was piped into the hangars to boost morale, while the factory had its own doctor, dentist and barber, and employed strict control of comfort breaks. It covered the hardships of working long shifts at the factory, and of wartime rationing. Other hazards included walking and driving home in the dark due to raids and the remote location. The workers' scant free time was discussed; they danced and enjoyed radio programs, such as Arthur Askey and Workers' Playtime and It's That Man Again.

In terms of the wider political context, it discussed the buildup to war and the approach of Neville Chamberlain, the Prime Minister until May 1940, and featured cabinet papers showing concern over the German effect on production, the domain of Lord Beaverbrook, the Minister of Aircraft Production. The documentary also covered the role of propaganda newsreels in the war effort. According to the documentary, a North American narrator was chosen for the newsreel to be shown in America, to show them that the British were also manufacturing efficiently while under attack, and to not only show them that Brits "could take it", but that they could "dish it out as well". According to Hastings it had probably been a Wellington force that had caused an air raid warning in Berlin, just as the visiting Russian ambassador Vyacheslav Molotov was being reassured by Hitler that the British were near defeat.

In the wider civilian context, the film dealt with the effects of domestic bomb damage and air raids, and air raid shelters, and the role of Welsh coal mining, a reserved industry supporting production at Broughton, with Ben Motram having been a coal miner at Llay main colliery, the deepest mine in Europe at the time, with wife Constance employed as a seamstress at the factory.

In the wider military context, the film covered the Battle of Britain and German raids on south eastern RAF airfields, followed by the sequence of the British Prime Minister Winston Churchill ordering a raid on Berlin after a German raid damaged parts of London housing, which (it claimed) led to Hitler switching raids to cities, which while devastating for civilians, took pressure off the RAF. Further on the film relayed the progress of the ground and aerial fighting in Europe, and covered German Luftwaffe raids on the Channel Ports and Dunkirk.

==== Postwar ====
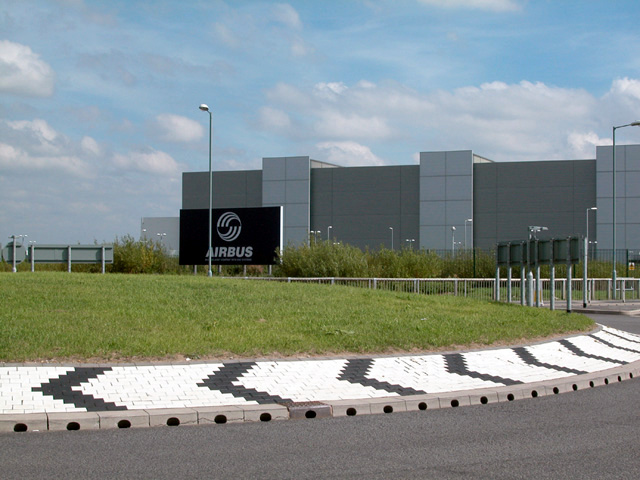
The Broughton site is now an Airbus factory

Moving to after the end of war in Europe, the film related how the factory was then put to use making prefab houses and how, while many single women workers were retained, all the married women were made redundant. There were stories about the success or otherwise of the resulting reunions with their husbands returning home from the fighting, moving forward into demobilized civilian life. Linking the Broughton factory of the present day to the time of the war, the film included footage of the present day Airbus operations at the site, including the manufacturing process and the loading of parts onto the Airbus Beluga transport aircraft. Stories of long-serving employers were included, and of an employee of the old factory whose grandson now works at the Airbus plant.

==== Dedications ====
Towards the end of the documentary, there is also extended footage of Air Forces Memorial at Runnymede, used as the backdrop as Cooling recites a poem he wrote. The documentary closes with an on screen dedication to "Flt Lt Rupert “Tiny” Cooling (1920–2010) and to the wartime workers on the Broughton production line".

== See also ==
- Aircraft records
- List of newsreels by country
- List of Vickers Wellington operators
- SS Robert E. Peary, a US Liberty Ship built in under five days

== Notes ==
- ^note 1 The title page of the newsreel gives the title as Worker's Week-End in capitals. Alternate versions in later sources reflect changing English language use, giving it as Workers' Weekend, Workers Weekend, and Workers' Week End, with the first now considered the more usual spelling according to the Imperial War Museum.
- ^note 2 The film's running time is variously recorded as 12 minutes (Telegraph, BBC Four), 12 minutes 40 seconds (National Archives), and 14 minutes (Imperial War Museum).
- ^note 3 The newsreel's narrator is described as "an officer of the RAF" by the Imperial War Museum.
