= No. 298 Wing RAF =

No. 298 Wing RAF
- Active: 19 September 1942 - 1 June 1945
- Country: United Kingdom
- Branch: Royal Air Force

No. 298 Wing RAF was a wing of the Royal Air Force.

26 Squadron SAAF was seconded to 298 Wing RAF and was based at Takoradi, Gold Coast (Ghana), West Africa during the Second World War. They flew Vickers Wellingtons on anti-submarine and convoy escort duties over the Atlantic.
