= SS Robert E. Peary =

World War II Liberty ship of the United States

History

United States
- Name: Robert E. Peary
- Namesake: Robert Peary
- Builder: Permanente Metals Corporation, Yard No. 2, Richmond, California
- Laid down: 8 November 1942
- Launched: 12 November 1942
- Sponsored by: Mrs. James F. Byrnes
- Acquired: 15 November 1942
- Commissioned: 15 November 1942
- Decommissioned: December 1946
- Fate: Scrapped at Baltimore, Maryland, June 1963

General characteristics
- Class & type: Type EC2-S-C1 Liberty ship
- Displacement: 14,245 long tons (14,474 t)
- Length: 441 ft 6 in (134.57 m) o/a; 417 ft 9 in (127.33 m) p/p; 427 ft (130 m) w/l
- Beam: 57 ft (17 m)
- Draft: 27 ft 9 in (8.46 m)
- Propulsion: Two oil-fired boilers; Triple-expansion steam engine; 2,500 hp (1,900 kW); Single screw
- Speed: 11 knots (20 km/h; 13 mph)
- Range: 20,000 nmi (37,000 km; 23,000 mi)
- Capacity: 10,856 t (10,685 long tons) deadweight (DWT)
- Crew: 81
- Armament: Stern-mounted 4 in (100 mm) deck gun; Variety of anti-aircraft guns

SS Robert E. Peary was a Liberty ship that gained fame during World War II for being built in a shorter time than any other such vessel. Named after Robert Peary, an American explorer who was among the first people to reach the geographic North Pole, she was launched on November 12, 1942, just 4 days, 15 hours and 29 minutes after the keel was laid down.

== Construction ==
Robert E. Peary was built at the Permanente Metals Corporation No. 2 Yard in Richmond, California and was the 47th ship built at the yard. The record set in her construction was the result of a competition between shipyards to see which could build a Liberty ship the fastest. The Oregon Shipbuilding Corporation had built another Liberty ship, Joseph N. Teal, in only ten days between 13 and 23 September 1942. The yard's owner, Henry J. Kaiser (who also owned the Richmond Shipyards), was asked by a reporter if it could have been done quicker. He replied that it could have been constructed in eight days but had been delayed to allow President Franklin D. Roosevelt to attend.

Roosevelt agreed to a proposal to build a ship in half the time. To meet the deadline, the Richmond Shipyard prefabricated as much of the vessel as possible at its No. 2 Yard and pre-positioned the sections to enable the workers to assemble it with maximum efficiency. The keel was laid at 12:01 am on 8 November 1942. The rest of the ship was built from prefabricated 250-ton sections with the engines already in place. The bottom shell unit was installed first, followed by the inner-bottom unit to support the boiler, engine and pump. The boilers were put in place by mid-morning, followed by transverse bulkheads and the shaft tunnel. The upper deck was completed on the second day, with the installation of the lower forepeak, more bulkheads and the fantail. The masts, derricks and superstructure were installed on the third day. During the final day the wiring, welding and painting was completed along with the installation of the forward gun platform and the inner stack. She was launched at 3:27 pm on 12 November, after around 250,000 individual parts weighing 14,000,000 lb (6,400,000 kg) had been assembled. After 26 minutes of speeches, Mrs. Maude Byrnes, the wife of the head of Roosevelt's Economic Stabilization Office, christened the ship and it was sent down the slipway into San Francisco Bay. It was delivered for service on 15 November, setting an additional record of 7 days, 14 hours and 32 minutes from laying the keel to delivery.

The record speed of the construction was a propaganda effort intended to show that the United States could produce ships faster than they could be sunk. Normally, the Permanente yard took an average of about 50 days to build a Liberty ship. In fact, though, it could not realistically be done much faster as there was not enough steel or capacity to build them at such a pace. The ship was referred to as a "stunt ship", though Henry Kaiser referred to it as an "incentive ship" because of the boost that it provided to his workers' morale. Nonetheless, the extreme rapidity of the Robert E. Peary's construction illustrated how successfully US shipyards had adopted methods of mass production that had been pioneered in the motor industry; at the start of the Liberty ship program, the ships took an average of 1.4 million man-hours and 355 days to build, but by 1943 the figures had come down to under 500,000 man-hours (or 57 man years) and an average of 41 days.

== Service career ==
Robert E. Peary sailed on her maiden voyage on 22 November. She was operated by the Weyerhauser Steamship Company and first served in the Pacific Theatre, sailing to Noumea, New Caledonia before heading onwards to Guadalcanal. She sailed to the Atlantic Ocean, in April 1943, and operated there for the remainder of the war on the convoy routes to Europe, ferrying prisoners of war from North Africa and serving off Omaha Beach on D-Day. She was withdrawn to the Wilmington Reserve Fleet in December 1946, and was scrapped in June 1963, at Baltimore, Maryland.

== See also ==
- Vickers Wellington LN514, a British World War II bomber built in 24 hours
