= No. 344 Squadron RAF =

No. 344 (Flotille 1E) Squadron RAF
- Active: 29 November 1943 – 27 November 1945
- Country: United Kingdom
- Allegiance: Free French Forces
- Branch: Royal Air Force
- Nickname(s): Flottille 1E

Insignia
- Squadron Badge heraldry: None
- Squadron code: None

No. 344 Squadron was a Free French land based anti-submarine squadron given a Royal Air Force squadron number during World War II.

== History ==
The squadron was formed at Dakar, Senegal, on 29 November 1943 from Flotille 1E and equipped with British Wellington aircraft. U-403 was sunk by depth charges dropped by a Wellington on 18 August 1943 near Dakar; all 49 crewmen were killed.

The squadron remained under RAF control until 27 November 1945 when it disbanded and reverted to French control as Flottille 2F.

== Aircraft operated ==
Aircraft operated by No. 344 Squadron RAF
From	To	Aircraft	Variant
November 1943	November 1945	Vickers Wellington	XI
November 1943	November 1945	Vickers Wellington	XIII
