= 26 Squadron SAAF =

26 Squadron
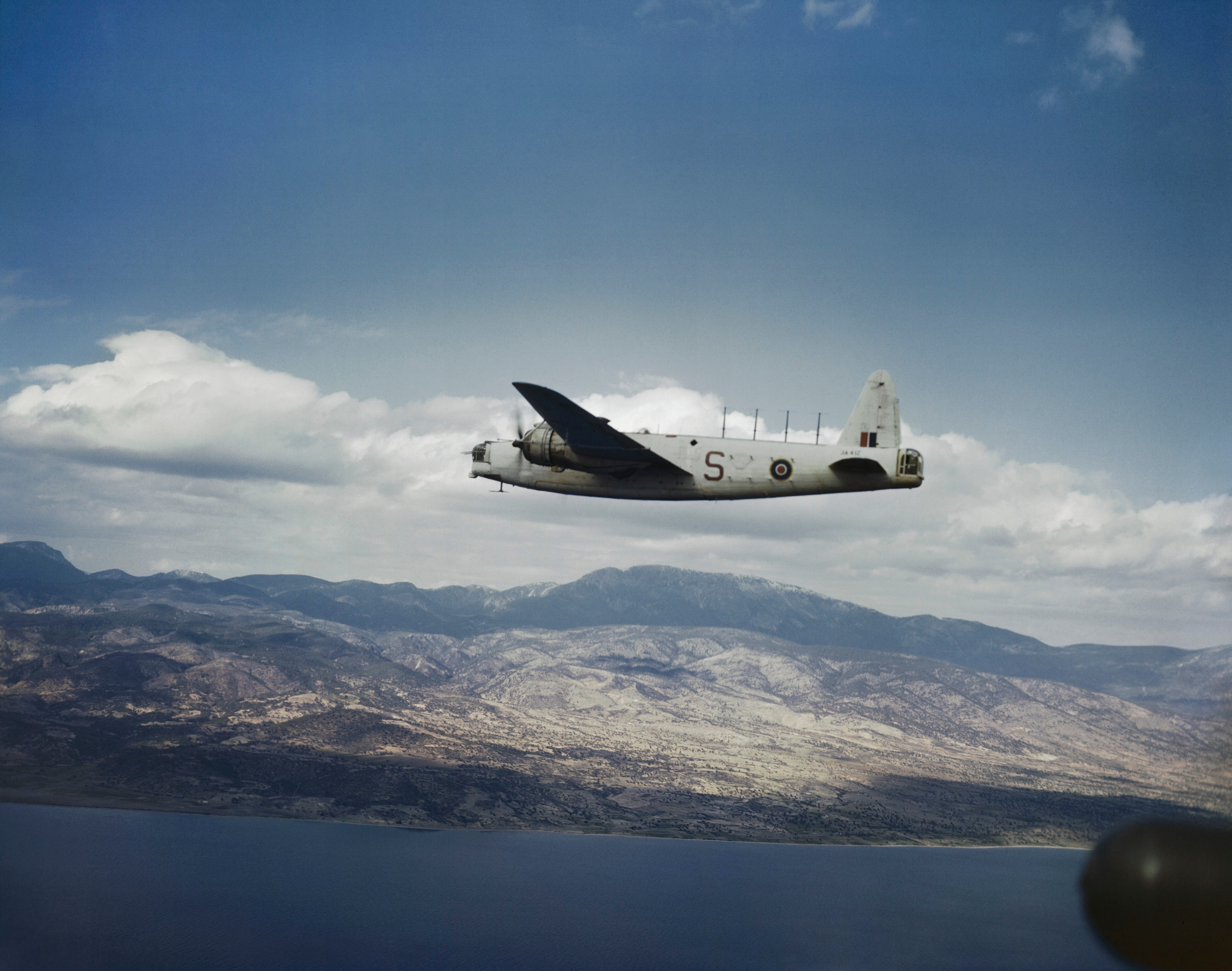
- A Vickers Wellington medium bomber, similar to the type flown by the squadron
- Active: 24 August 1942 - 12 June 1945
- Country: Union of South Africa
- Allegiance: King of South Africa
- Branch: South African Air Force
- Role: Maritime patrol Sqn
- Garrison/HQ: AFB Waterkloof

Insignia
- 26 Sqn badge

26 Squadron SAAF is a disbanded squadron of the South African Air Force. The squadron was based at Takoradi, Gold Coast (now Ghana) on the West Coast of Africa during World War II. They flew Vickers Wellingtons on anti-submarine and convoy escort patrols over the Atlantic. The squadron was seconded to No. 298 Wing RAF.

== History ==
- First formed: 24 August 1942
- Formed at: AFB Swartkop, South Africa
- First Operational: 4 May 1943
- Main Role: Anti-submarine (U-boat) patrols and convoy escort duties, Atlantic
- Main base: Takoradi, Gold Coast (now Ghana), West Africa
- Historic aircraft flown: Vickers Wellington MK X and XI
- Disbanded: 12 June 1945
- War Graves: Takoradi European Public cemetery(Ghana), Du Plantation cemetery(Liberia), Yaba Cemetery (Nigeria)
- Memorials: Bays Hill Memorial(South Africa) Commonwealth Air Forces Memorial(Malta), Umtentweni Memorial(South Africa)

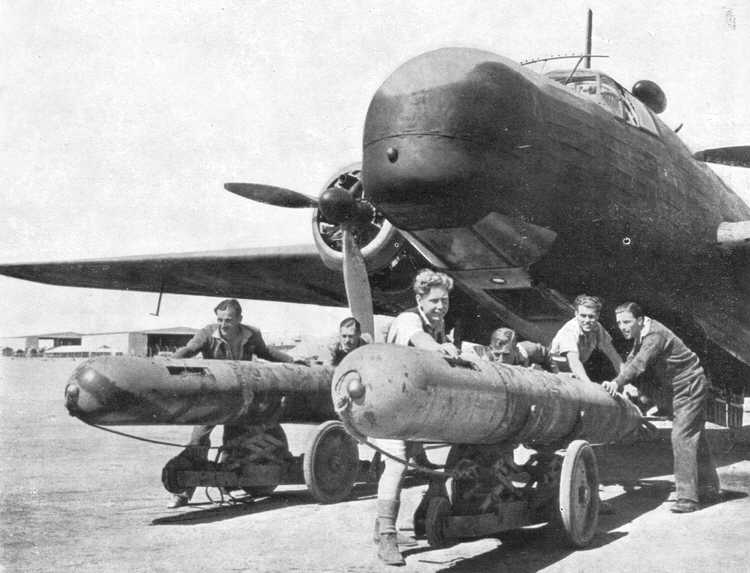
Torpedoes ready for loading aboard a Wellington, 1942
