= Vickers Wellington =

British medium bomber

Wellington
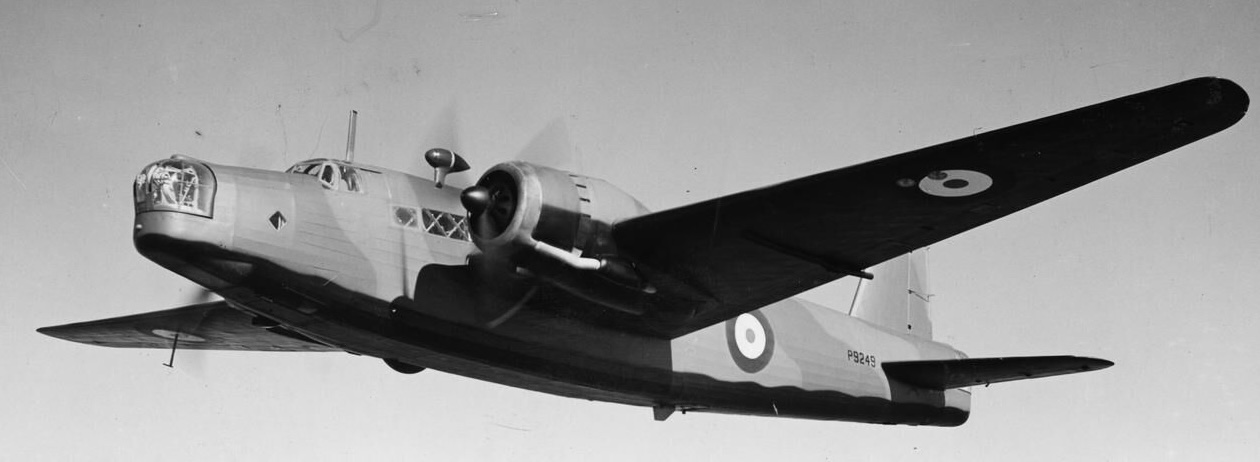
- Wellington B Mark IA. The geodetic construction is evident through the Perspex windows along the aircraft's side.

General information
- Type: Medium bomber anti-submarine aircraft
- Manufacturer: Vickers-Armstrongs
- Primary users: Royal Air Force Royal Australian Air Force; Royal Canadian Air Force; Fleet Air Arm
- Number built: 11,461 or 11,462

History
- Manufactured: 1936–1945
- Introduction date: October 1938
- First flight: 15 June 1936
- Retired: March 1953
- Developed into: Vickers Warwick; Vickers VC.1 Viking

The Vickers Wellington (nicknamed the Wimpy) is a twin-engined, long-range medium bomber designed and primarily produced by the British aircraft manufacturer Vickers-Armstrongs. It was the only British bomber that was produced for the duration of the Second World War, and was produced in a greater quantity than any other British-built bomber.

Development had been started in response to Air Ministry Specification B.9/32, issued in the middle of 1932, for a bomber for the Royal Air Force. This specification called for a twin-engined day bomber capable of delivering higher performance than any previous design. Other aircraft developed to the same specification include the Armstrong Whitworth Whitley and the Handley Page Hampden. During the development process, performance requirements such as for the tare weight changed substantially, and the engine used was not the one originally intended. The Wellington was designed during the mid-1930s at Brooklands in Weybridge, Surrey. Led by Vickers-Armstrongs' chief designer Rex Pierson, a key feature of the aircraft is its geodetic airframe fuselage structure, which was principally designed by Barnes Wallis. A larger heavy bomber aircraft designed to Specification B.1/35, the Vickers Warwick, was developed in parallel with the Wellington; the two aircraft shared around 85 percent of their structural components. Many elements of the Wellington were also re-used in a civil derivative, the Vickers VC.1 Viking.

Despite the original specification, the Wellington was typically used as a night bomber in the early years of the conflict, performing as one of the principal bombers used by Bomber Command. During 1943, it started to be superseded as a bomber by the larger four-engined "heavies" such as the Avro Lancaster. The Wellington continued to serve throughout the war in other duties, particularly as an anti-submarine aircraft with RAF Coastal Command. It remained first-line equipment through the end of the conflict, although it had been increasingly relegated to secondary roles. The Wellington was one of two bombers named after Arthur Wellesley, 1st Duke of Wellington, the other being the Vickers Wellesley.

== Development ==
=== Origins ===
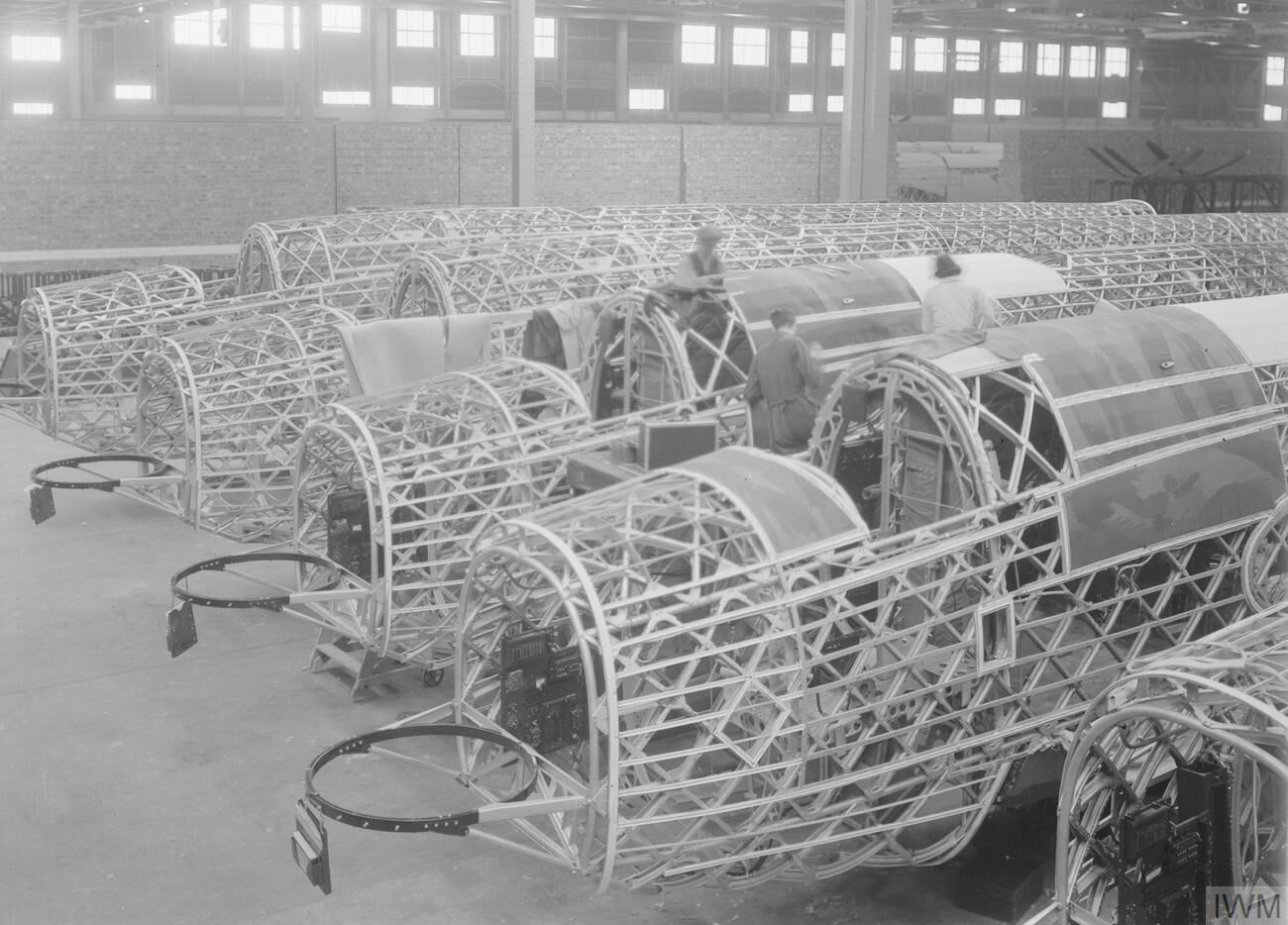
Wellingtons under construction, showing the geodetic airframe

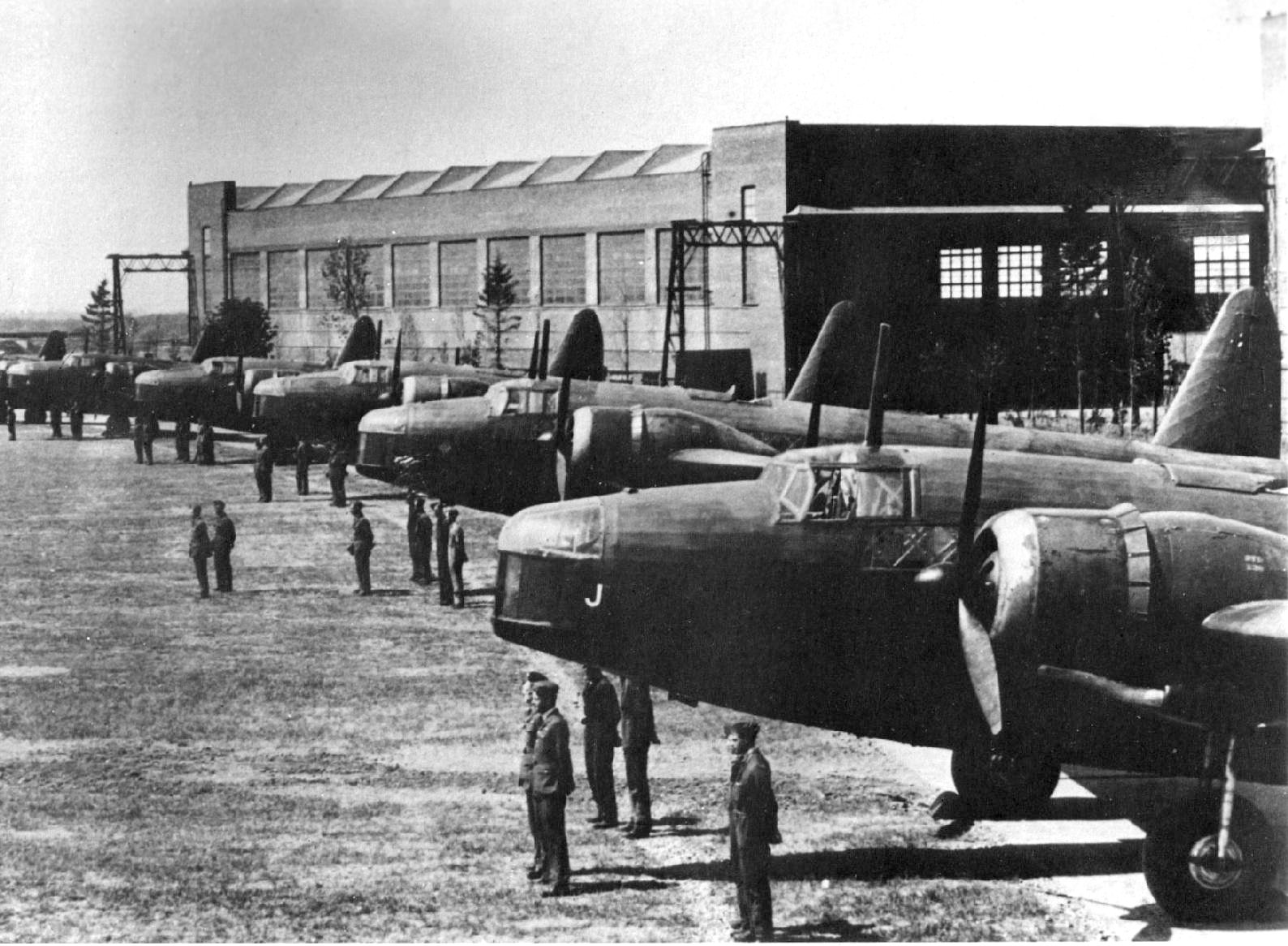
RNZAF Wellington Mark I aircraft with the original turrets; anticipating war, the New Zealand government loaned these aircraft and their aircrews to the RAF in August 1939

In October 1932, the British Air Ministry invited Vickers to tender for the recently issued Specification B.9/32, which sought a twin-engine medium daylight bomber. In response, Vickers conducted a design study, led by chief designer Rex Pierson. Early on, Vickers' chief structures designer Barnes Wallis proposed the use of a geodetic airframe, inspired by his previous work on airships and the single-engined Wellesley light bomber. During structural testing performed at the Royal Aircraft Establishment, Farnborough, the proposed structure demonstrated not only the required strength factor of six, but reached 11 without any sign of failure, proving the geodetic airframe to possess a strength far in excess of normal levels. This strength allowed for the structure design to be further developed to reduce the size of individual members and adopt simplified standard sections of lighter construction.

Vickers studied and compared the performance of various air- and liquid-cooled engines to power the bomber, including the Bristol Pegasus IS2, Pegasus IIS2, and Armstrong Siddeley Tiger radials, and the Rolls-Royce Goshawk I inline. The Pegasus was selected as the engine for air-cooled versions of the bomber, while the Goshawk engine was chosen for the liquid-cooled engine variant. On 28 February 1933, two versions of the aircraft, one with each of the selected powerplants, were submitted to the tender. In September 1933, the Air Ministry issued a pilot contract for the Goshawk-powered version. In August 1934, Vickers proposed to use either the Pegasus or the sleeve-valve nine-cylinder radial Bristol Perseus engines instead of the evaporative-cooled Goshawk, which promised improvements in speed, climb rate, ceiling, and single-engine flight capabilities without any major increase in all-up weight; the Air Ministry accepted the proposed changes.

Other refinements of the design had also been implemented and approved, such as the adoption of variable-pitch propellers, and the use of Vickers-produced gun turrets in the nose and tail positions. By December 1936, the specification had been revised to include front, rear, and midship wind-protected turret mountings. Other specification changes included modified bomb undershields and the inclusion of spring-loaded bomb bay doors. The proposal had also been developed further: a mid-wing arrangement was adopted instead of a shoulder-mounted wing for greater pilot visibility during formation flight and improved aerodynamic performance, as well as a substantially increased overall weight of the aircraft. The Air Ministry also conducted design studies on the adoption of the Rolls-Royce Merlin engine.

In spite of a traditional preference of the establishment to adhere strictly to the restrictive tare weight for the aircraft established in the tender, both Pierson and Wallis firmly believed that their design should adopt the most powerful engine available. Perhaps in response to pressure from Vickers, the Air Ministry overlooked, if not openly accepted, the removal of the tare weight restriction, as between the submission of the tender in 1933 and the flight of the first prototype in 1936, the tare weight eventually rose from 6,300 lb (2.9 t) to 11,508 lb (5.220 t). (Note: Tony Buttler notes that Specification B.3/34 had a higher tare weight because of the lapse of international agreement in 1934 on the weights on bombers and Vickers declined to tender to the specification because they were already scaling up the Type 271 design to where it would meet the specification) The prescribed bomb load and range requirements were routinely revised upwards by the Air Ministry; by November 1935, figures within the ministry were interested in the possibility of operating the aircraft at an all-up weight of 30,500 lb (13.8 t), which aviation author C. F. Andrews described as "a very high figure for a medium bomber of those days".

During the development phase of the aircraft, as Andrews put it: "the political and military climate of Europe was changing rapidly. The threats of the dictators of Germany and Italy began to exert pressure on the British government to make a reappraisal of the strength of its armed forces, especially that of the Royal Air Force." By 1936, the creation of a large bomber force, which would form the spearhead of British offensive power, had been recognised as a high priority; accordingly, a new command organisation within the RAF, Bomber Command, was formed that year to deliver upon this requirement.

=== Prototype and design revision ===
In early 1936, an initial prototype, K4049, which was originally designated as a Type 271, was assembled. The prototype could accommodate a payload of nine 250 lb (110 kg) or 500 lb (230 kg) bombs, and both nose and tail gun positions were fitted with hand-operated turrets with a gun in each; provision for a third retractable gun in a dorsal position was made. It had provision for a crew of four, along with a fifth position for special duties.

On 5 June 1936, the name Crecy was chosen for the type, and it was publicly displayed as such. On 15 August 1936, the aircraft was accepted for production. On 8 September 1936, the service name Wellington was adopted for the type; it fitted with Air Ministry nomenclature of naming bombers after towns and followed the Vickers Wellesley in referring to the Napoleonic War general Arthur Wellesley, the Duke of Wellington. On 12 December 1936, a corresponding works order was issued for the Wellington.

On 15 June 1936, K4049 conducted its maiden flight from Brooklands. Vickers chief test pilot Joseph Summers flew K4049 on its first flight, accompanied by Wallis and Trevor Westbrook. The aircraft soon came to be widely regarded as being an advanced design for its era and proved to have considerable merit during its flight trials. On 19 April 1937, K4049 was destroyed by an accident during a service test flight by Maurice Hare. The cause was the failure of the elevator's horn balance due to excessive slipstream exposure, leading to the aircraft inverting and rapidly descending into terrain. It was destroyed in the crash, which also resulted in the death of the navigator, Smurthwaite. The horn balances were later deleted from the design and were not on production aircraft.

Refinement of the Wellington's design was influenced by the issuing of Specifications B.3/34 and B.1/35, the latter of which led to a larger bomber aircraft, the Vickers Warwick. With detail design work on both being done at same time and both aircraft using geodetic-inspired construction there was commonality in components. The production model Wellington was a complete redesign, resulting in a lengthened nose for turret and bomb aimer's position, a reshaped elevator, and deepened fuselage which accommodated a larger bombload and the increased crew from four to five members. Other changes made included the adoption of a retractable tailwheel and constant-speed propellers; the Air Ministry also requested the adoption of a Nash & Thompson-design ventral turret in place of the Vickers design.

On 23 December 1937, the first production Wellington Mk I, L4212, conducted its first flight, followed by an intensive flight programme. Flight trials with L4212 confirmed the aerodynamic stability initially encountered by K4049, but also revealed the aircraft to be nose-heavy during dives, which was attributed to the redesigned elevator. Modifications, including the linking of the flaps and the elevator trim tabs, were tested on L4212 and resolved the problem.

=== Production ===
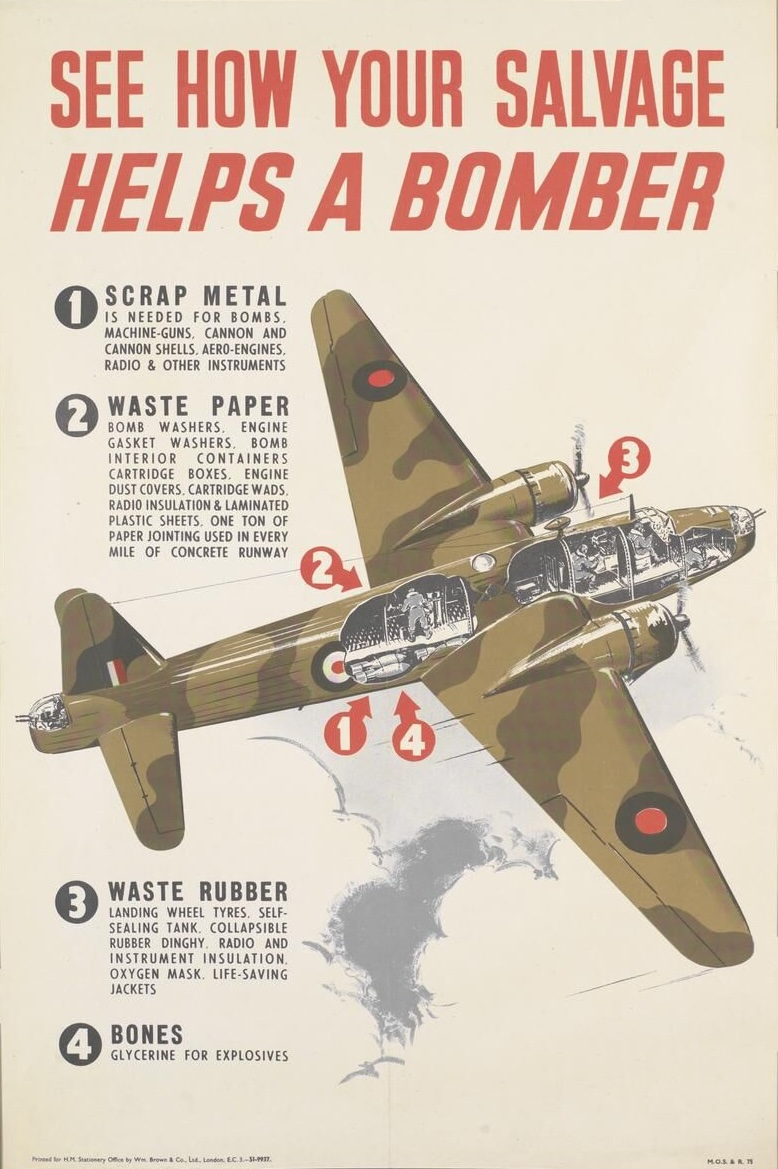
Wartime poster using a cutaway of Wellington to illustrate how scrap and salvage was recycled for use in the production of war materiel.

In August 1936, an initial order for 180 Wellington Mk I aircraft, powered by a pair of 1,050 hp (780 kW) Bristol Pegasus radial engines, was received by Vickers; it had been placed so rapidly that the order occurred prior to the first meeting intended to decide the details of the production aircraft.

In October 1937, an order was placed with Gloster Aircraft Company for production of 100 Wellington Mk Is to be followed by 100 Wellington Mk II aircraft with Rolls-Royce Merlin X . Another order was placed for 64 Wellingtons to be produced by Armstrong Whitworth Aircraft at Coventry. With this flurry of orders and production having been assured by the end of 1937, Vickers set about simplifying the manufacturing process of the aircraft and announced a target of building one Wellington per day.

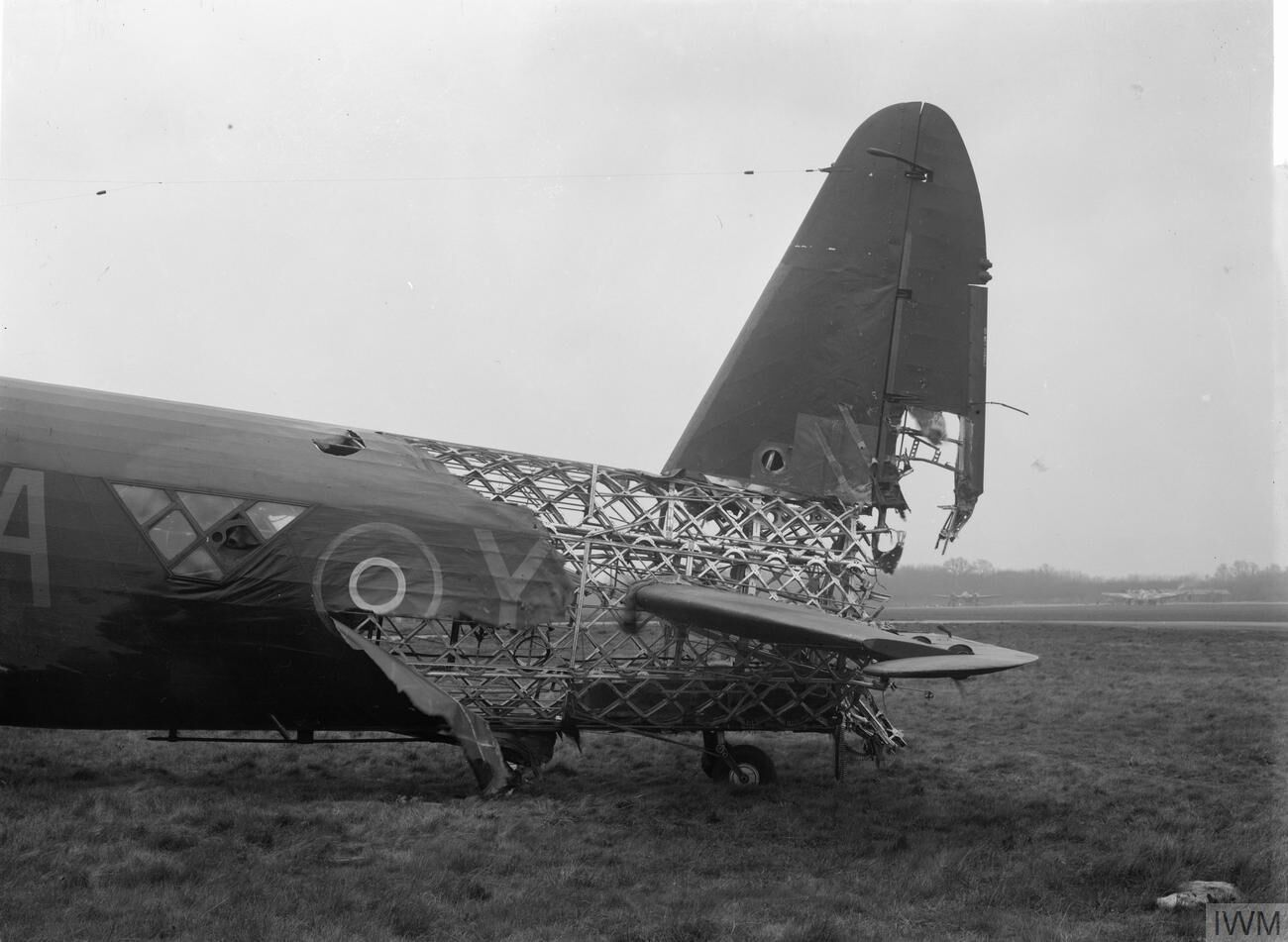
Wellington Mark X HE239 of No.428 Sqn. RCAF. It completed its bomb run despite losing the rear gunner and turret and then flew back home for a landing with its bomb bay doors stuck open due to lack of hydraulic power

The geodetic design took longer to build than comparable aircraft using the more conventional monocoque approach, leading to some criticism of the Wellington. In addition it was difficult to cut holes in the fuselage for access or equipment fixtures; to aid manufacturing, the Leigh light was deployed through the mounting for the absent FN9 ventral turret.

The Gloster and AWA contracts were transferred to shadow factories in the north-west. In the late 1930s, Vickers built Wellingtons at a rate of one per day at Weybridge and 50 a month at Broughton in North Wales. Many of the employees on the production lines were only semi-skilled and new to aircraft construction. Peak wartime production in 1942 saw monthly rates of 70 at Weybridge, 130 at Broughton and 102 at Blackpool. Shadow factories were set up to produce parts for the Wellington all over the British Isles.

In October 1943, as a propaganda and morale-boosting exercise, workers at Broughton gave up their weekend to build Wellington number LN514 rushed by the clock. The bomber was assembled in 23 hours 50 minutes, and took off after 24 hours 48 minutes, beating the record of 48 hours set by a factory in California. Each Wellington was usually built within 60 hours. It was filmed for the Ministry of Information for a newsreel Worker's Week-End, and was broadcast in both Britain and America. It was the first time in aviation history that an aircraft manufacturer anywhere in the world had attempted such a feat with a metal aircraft of this scale.

A total of 180 Wellington Mk I aircraft were built; 150 for the RAF and 30 for the Royal New Zealand Air Force (RNZAF) (which were transferred to the RAF on the outbreak of war and used by 75 Squadron). In October 1938, the Mk I entered service with 9 Squadron. The Wellington was initially outnumbered by the Handley Page Hampden (also ordered by the Ministry to B.9/32) and the Armstrong Whitworth Whitley (to B.34/3 for a 'night' bomber) but outlasted both rival aircraft in service. The Wellington went on to be built in 16 variants and two post-war training conversions. The number of Wellingtons built totalled 11,462 of all versions, a greater quantity produced than any other British bomber. On 13 October 1945, the last Wellington to be produced rolled out.

=== Further development ===
The Wellington Mk I was quickly superseded by improved variants. Improvements to the turrets and the strengthening of the undercarriage quickly resulted in the Wellington Mk IA. The Mk IA was specified to be based on the Merlin X engined Wellington Mk II design and was in theory to be able to be fitted with either Merlins or Pegasus but in practice only radials were fitted. The Mark IA was stressed to the Mark II 28,000 lb (13,000 kg) and had stronger undercarriage with larger wheels and Frazer-Nash turrets.

Due to difficulties with performance of the Vickers turrets on the Mark I that left the Wellington with weaker than intended defences, production of Wellington Mk IB with Frazer Nash armament was proposed for trials but since the Frazer-Nash turrets were already being accepted for the Mark IA, the Mark IB may not have been built or if built re-designated as Mark IA. Further development of various aspects of the aircraft, using knowledge learned was incorporated into the airframe at Weybridge by executive decision. Redesigned hydraulics and 24 volt electrical systems, along with a replacement of the ventral turret gun with two beam machine guns (either .303 Vickers K, or Browning), was designated Wellington Mk IC and a Type number generated after the fact.

In January 1938, design work on what would become the Wellington Mk II formally commenced. The principal change on this model was the adoption of the Merlin engine in place of the Pegasus XVIII; other modifications included hydraulic and oxygen system revisions along with the installation of cabin heating and an astrodome. On 3 March 1939, L4250, the prototype Mk II, performed its maiden flight; this had been delayed due to production delays of its Merlin X engines. Stability and balance problems were encountered during flight tests of the prototype, resulting in further changes such as the enlargement of the tailplane. By late 1939, the Mk II was capable of delivering superior performance to the Mk IC, such as higher cruising and top speeds, increased all-up weight or alternatively greater range and a raised ceiling.

== Design ==
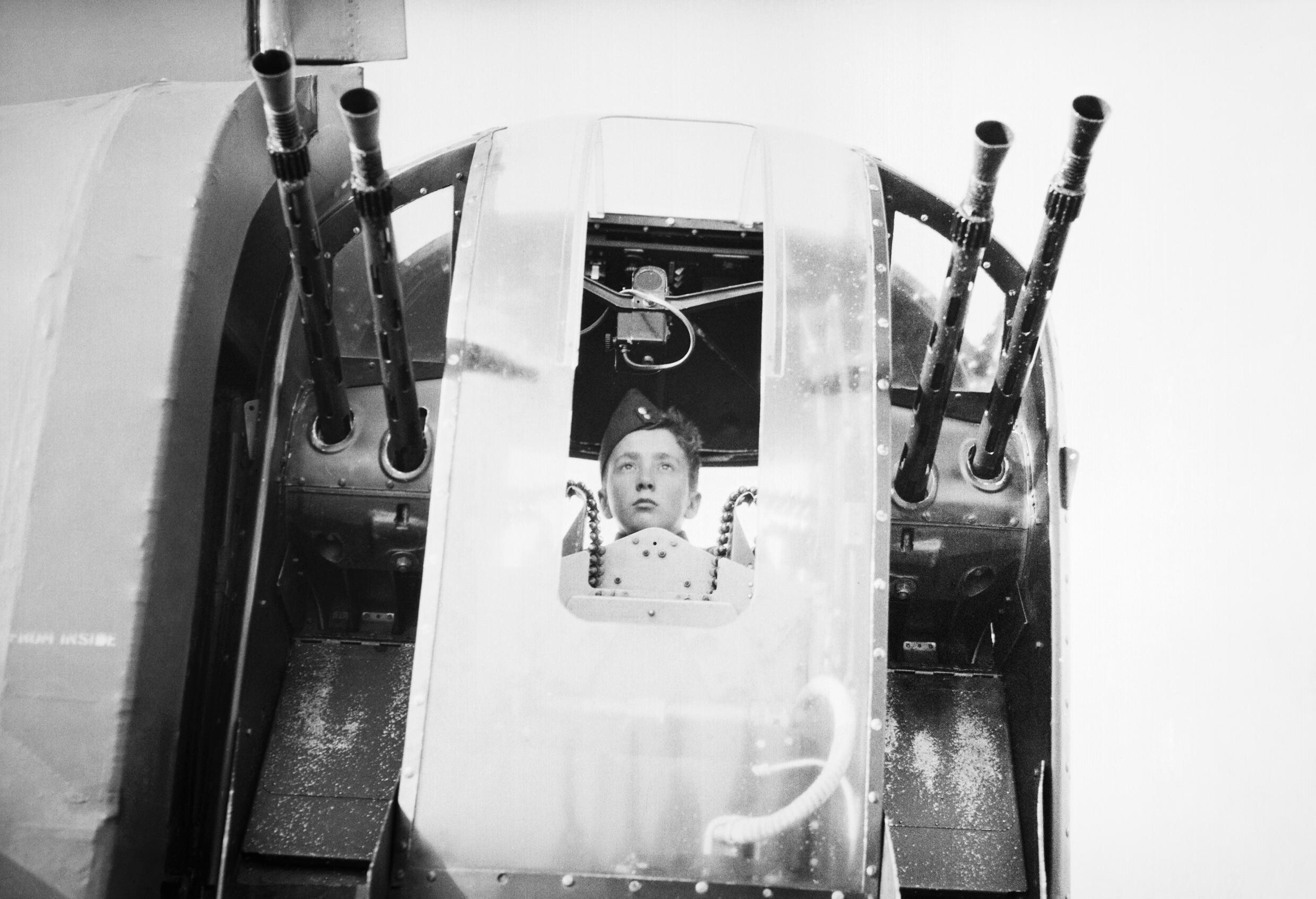
The tail turret of a Wellington, with cadet gunner, in 1942

The Vickers Wellington was a twin-engined long-range medium bomber, initially powered by a pair of Bristol Pegasus radial engines, which drove a pair of de Havilland two-pitch propellers. Various engines and propeller combinations were used on variants of the aircraft, which included models of the Bristol Hercules and the Rolls-Royce Merlin engines. Recognisable characteristics of the Wellington include the high aspect ratio of its tapered wing, the depth of its fuselage and the use of a tall single fin on its tail unit, which reportedly aided in recognition of the type.

The Wellington typically had a crew of five, the bomb-aimer being located in the aircraft's nose. The Wellington could be fitted with dual flight controls, and specialised dual-control conversion sets were developed for the purpose of performing training upon the type. The cockpit also contained provisions for heating and de-icing equipment, which was introduced on later models of the Wellington. The Wellington Mk I had a maximum offensive bomb load of 4,500 lb (2,000 kg), more than one-fifth of the aircraft's 21,000 lb (9,500 kg) all-up weight. Additional munitions and an expanded bombing capacity were changes in many of the wartime variants of the Wellington, including the carrying of larger bombs.

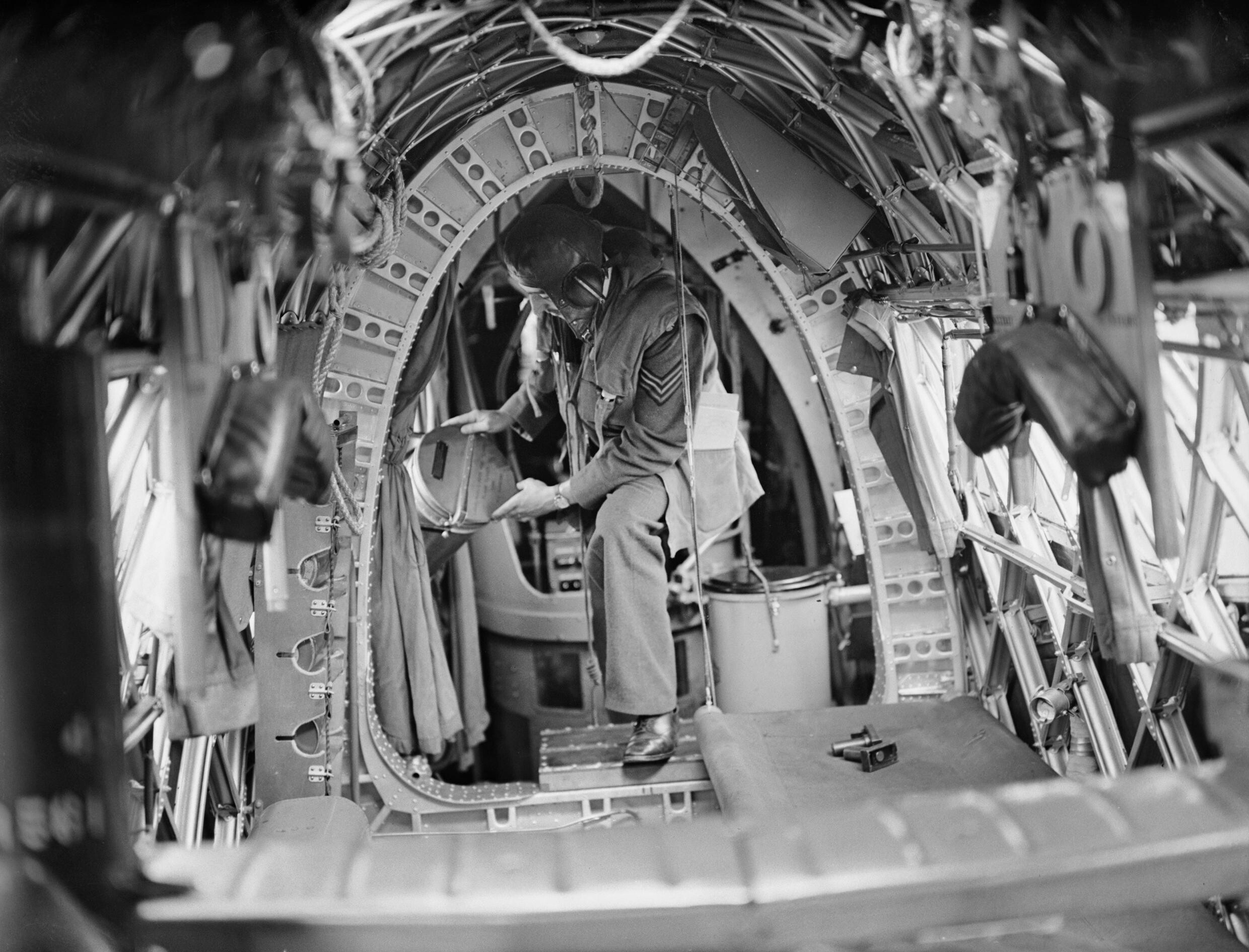
A crew member inside rear of Wellington fuselage

Defensive armament comprised the forward and tail turret gun positions, along with a retractable revolving ventral turret. Due to the high cruising speeds of the Wellington, it had been realised that fully enclosed turrets, as opposed to semi-enclosed or exposed turrets, would be necessary; the turrets were also power-operated to traverse with the speed and manoeuvrability necessary to keep up with the new generations of opposing fighter aircraft. The Vickers design put the gunner in a fixed seat behind the guns (a pair of .303 in (7.7 mm) Browning machine guns. ) which were mounted on a pillar with a Nash & Thompson control unit, and fired through a moving slot in the framed canopy. Although roomy, there were problems with malfunctions and poor gunnery and Vickers were given a directive by the Air Staff to replace them. At the same time a development contract was placed with Nash & Thompson for a turret that could be used for both front and rear positions. The resulting FN.5 was also used on Short Stirling and Avro Manchester

Due to the specialised nature of increasingly advanced turrets, these were treated as ancillary equipment, being designed and supplied independently and replacing Vickers' own turrets developed for the aircraft. The Vickers-built ventral turret of the Mk I was replaced by a Nash & Thompson-built FN.25 counterpart as standard. The squadrons were critical of the ventral turrets; when extended they slowed the aircraft by 10 mph, the single narrow window pane limited visibility and sometimes froze in place and had to be jettisoned. The ventral turrets were not fitted after the first batch of Wellington IA

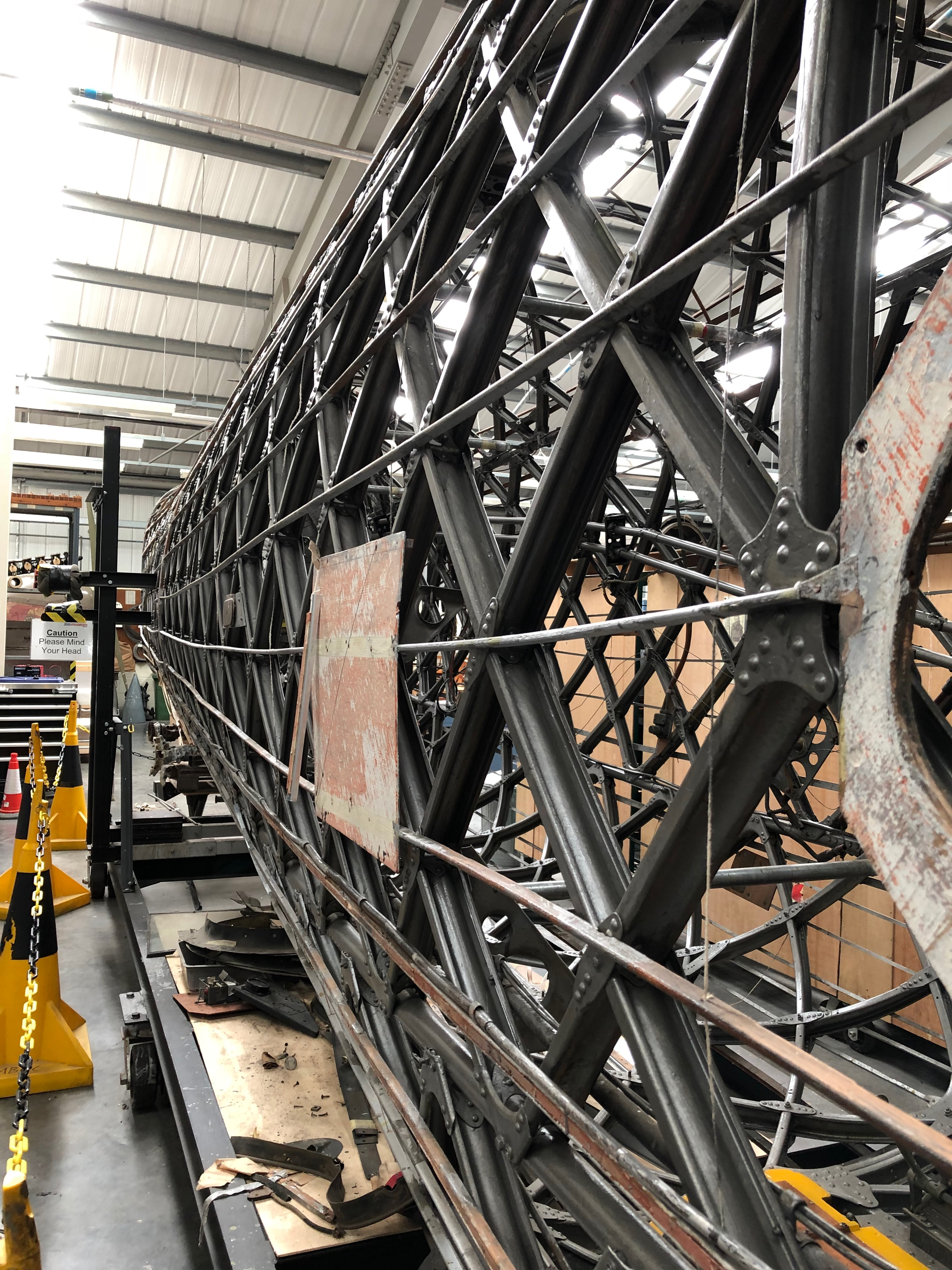
Vickers Wellington fuselage during restoration showing its geodetic airframe

A novelty of the Wellington was its geodetic construction, devised by aircraft designer and inventor Barnes Wallis. The fuselage was built from 1,650 elements, consisting of duralumin W-beams which formed into a metal framework. Wooden battens were screwed to the beams and were covered with Irish linen; the linen, treated with layers of dope, formed the outer skin of the aircraft. The construction proved to be compatible with significant adaptations and alterations including greater all-up weight, larger bombs, tropicalisation and long-range fuel tanks.

The metal lattice gave the structure considerable strength, with any stringer able to support a portion of load from the opposite side of the aircraft. Damaged or destroyed beams on one side could still leave the aircraft structure viable; as a result, Wellingtons with huge areas of framework missing were often able to return when other types would not have survived, leading to stories of the aircraft's "invulnerability". The effect was enhanced by the fabric skin occasionally burning off leaving the naked frames exposed. A further advantage of the geodetic construction of the wings was its enabling of a unique method for housing the fuel, with each wing containing three fuel tanks within the unobstructed space provided between the front and rear spars outboard of the engines. A disadvantage of the geodetic fuselage structure was its insufficient lengthwise stiffness: when fitted with attachment for towing cargo gliders, its structure "gave" and stretched slightly.

== Operational history ==
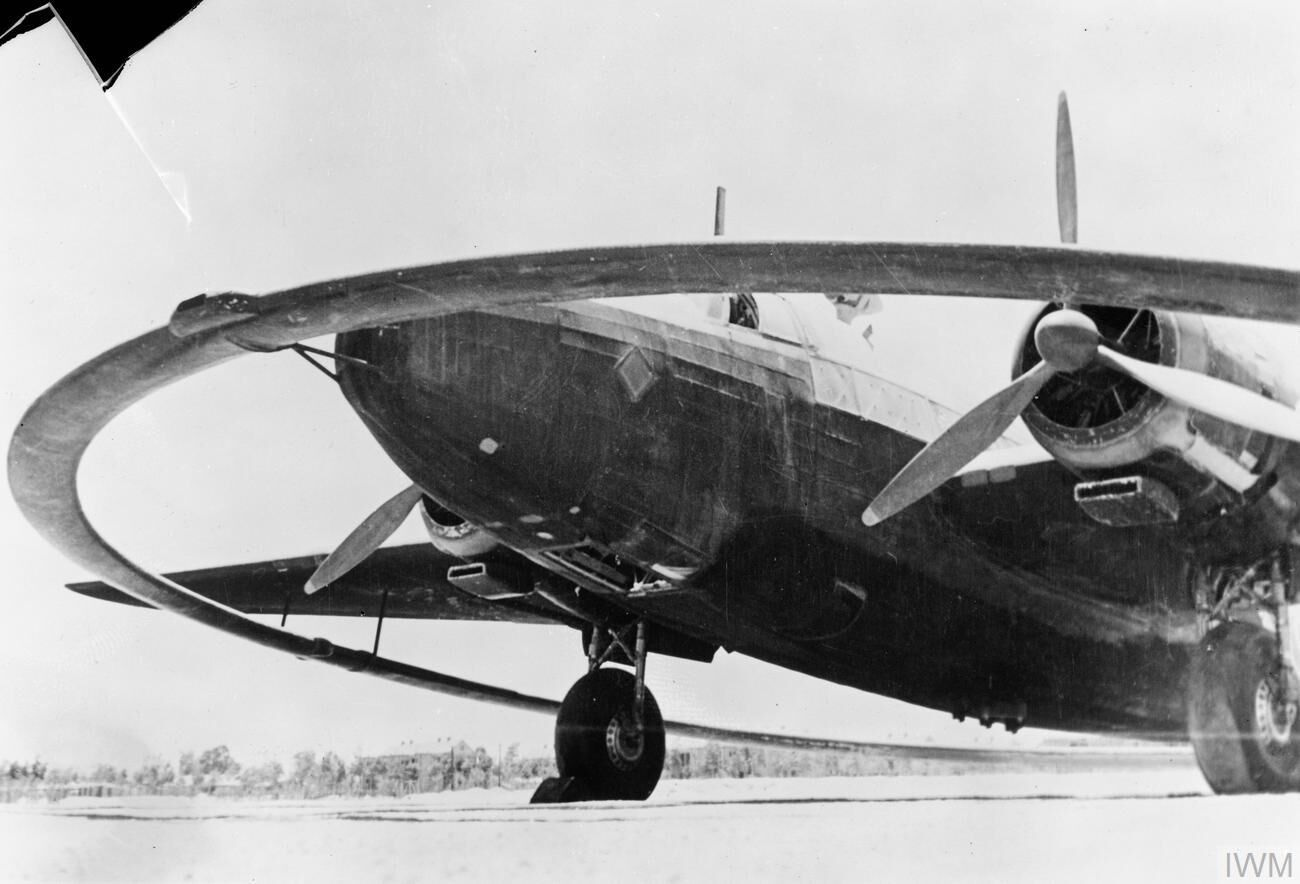
The 48 ft diameter magnetic coil on a Wellington DWI Mark II was used to detonate naval mines.

On 3 September 1939, the same day the United Kingdom declared war on Germany in response to the invasion of Poland, No. 3 Group Bomber Command based in East Anglia comprised six front line squadrons (No. 9, No. 37, No. 38, No. 99, No. 115 and No. 149 Squadrons) and two reserve squadrons (No. 214 and No. 215 squadrons), all equipped with a mixture of Wellington Mk I and Mk IA aircraft.

On 4 September 1939, less than 24 hours after the commencement of hostilities, a total of 14 Wellingtons of No. 9 and No. 149 Squadrons, alongside a number of Bristol Blenheim aircraft, performed the first RAF bombing raid of the war, against German shipping at Brunsbüttel. The bombing of the harbour had not been permitted by Chamberlain's War Cabinet for fear of injuring civilians. The effectiveness of the raid was diminished by poor weather and high amounts of anti-aircraft fire. A pair of Wellingtons became the first aircraft to be lost on the Western Front.

On 3 December 1939, 24 Wellingtons of No. 38, No. 115 and No. 147 Squadrons attacked the German fleet moored at Heligoland. The bombing commenced from high altitude and, while results of the bombing itself proved negligible, the ability of a formation of Wellingtons to penetrate strongly defended hostile airspace was validated. On 14 December 1939, 12 Wellingtons of No. 99 Squadron conducted a low-level raid upon German shipping at the Schillig Roads and Wilhelmshaven. Encountering enemy fire from warships, flak, and Luftwaffe aircraft, the Wellington formation lost five aircraft, along with another that crashed near its base, while only one enemy fighter was shot down.

On 18 December 1939, 24 Wellingtons of No. 9, No. 37 and No. 149 Squadrons participated in the Battle of the Heligoland Bight against the German fleet and naval bases in both the Schillig Roads and Wilhelmshaven. The Wellingtons were unable to drop their bombs as all vessels were in harbour, thus restrictions on endangering civilians prevented their engagement. Having been alerted by radar, Luftwaffe fighter aircraft intercepted the incoming bombers near to Heligoland and attacked the formation for much of the way home. Twelve of the bombers were destroyed and a further three were badly damaged. The Wellingtons shot down four aircraft.

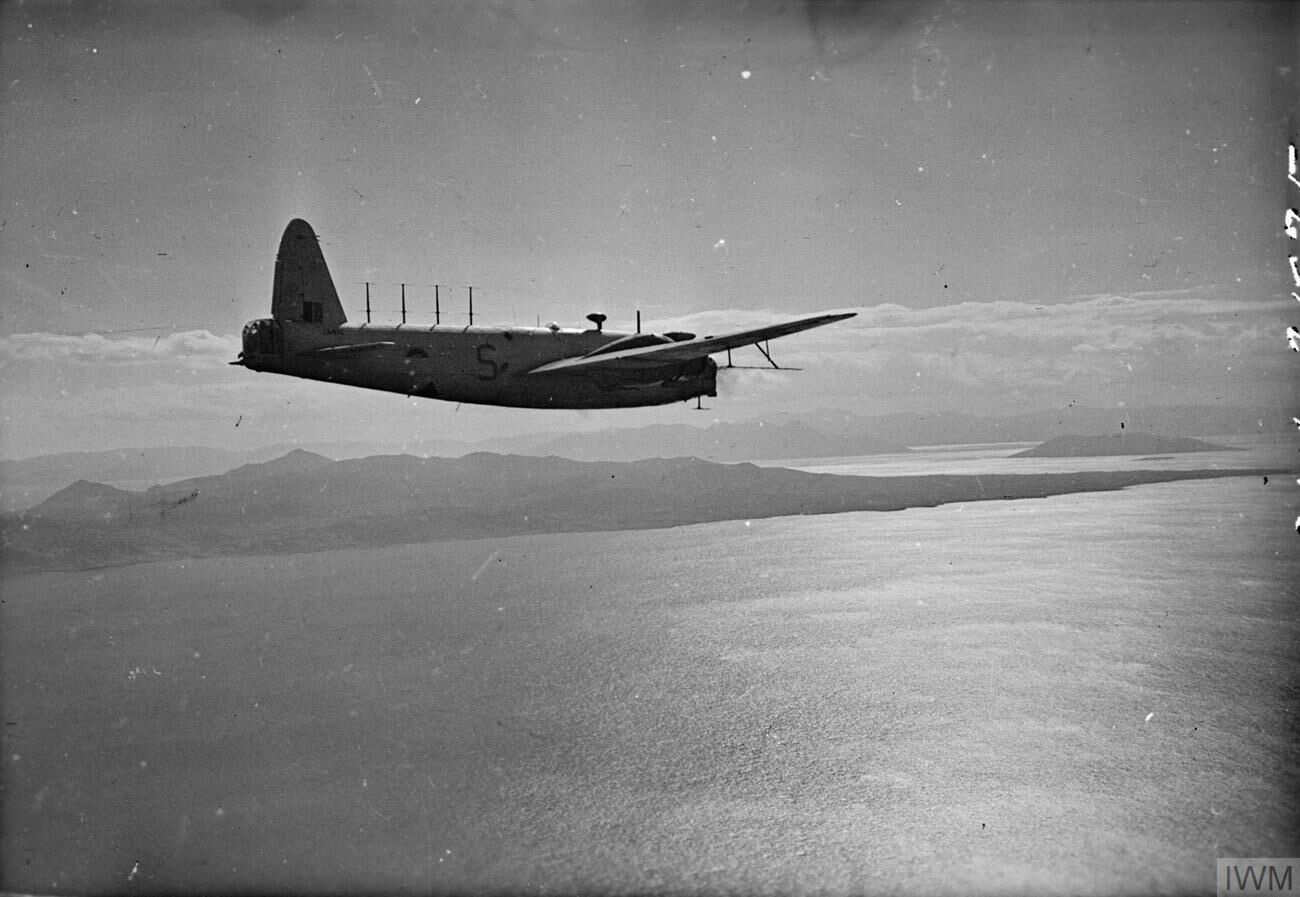
Wellington GR Mk XIII showing anti-submarine radar masts

The action at Heligoland highlighted the Wellington's vulnerability to attacking fighters, possessing neither self-sealing fuel tanks nor sufficient defensive armament. The nose and tail turrets protected against attacks from the front and rear, the Wellington had no defences against attacks from the beam and above, as it had not been believed that such attacks were possible owing to the high speed of aircraft involved and the deflection shooting required. Unescorted day bombing was abandoned and Bomber Command decided to use the Wellington force to attack German communications and industrial targets instead.

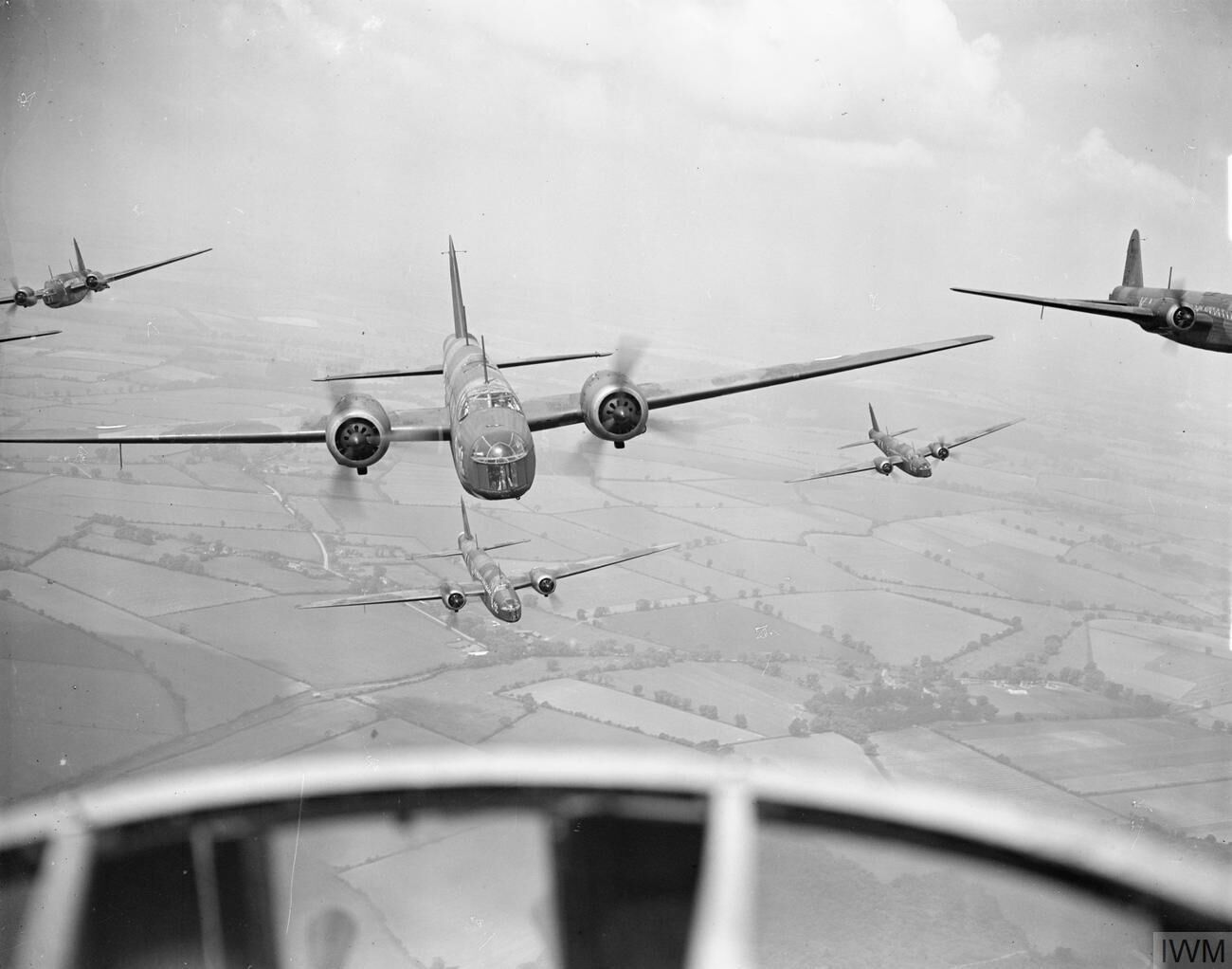
Vickers Wellingtons of 9 Squadron flying in formation.

The Wellington was converted for night operations; on 25 August 1940, the type participated in the first night raid on Berlin. During the First 1,000 bomber raid, on Cologne on 30 May 1942, 599 out of 1,046 RAF aircraft dispatched were Wellingtons; of these, 101 were flown by Polish aircrew. During operations under Bomber Command, Wellingtons flew 47,409 operations, dropped 41,823 tons (37,941 tonnes) of bombs and lost 1,332 aircraft in action.

In one incident, a German Messerschmitt Bf 110 night-fighter attacked a Wellington returning from an attack on Münster, causing a fire at the rear of the starboard engine. The second pilot, Sergeant James Allen Ward (RNZAF) climbed out of the fuselage, kicked holes in the doped fabric of the wing for foot and hand holds to reach the starboard engine and smothered the burning upper wing covering. He and the aircraft returned home safely and Ward was awarded the Victoria Cross. A unique feat for the type occurred on 23 December 1944 when a Me 163 Komet was shot down by rear gunner Gerry Elsyon, who was awarded the DFM.

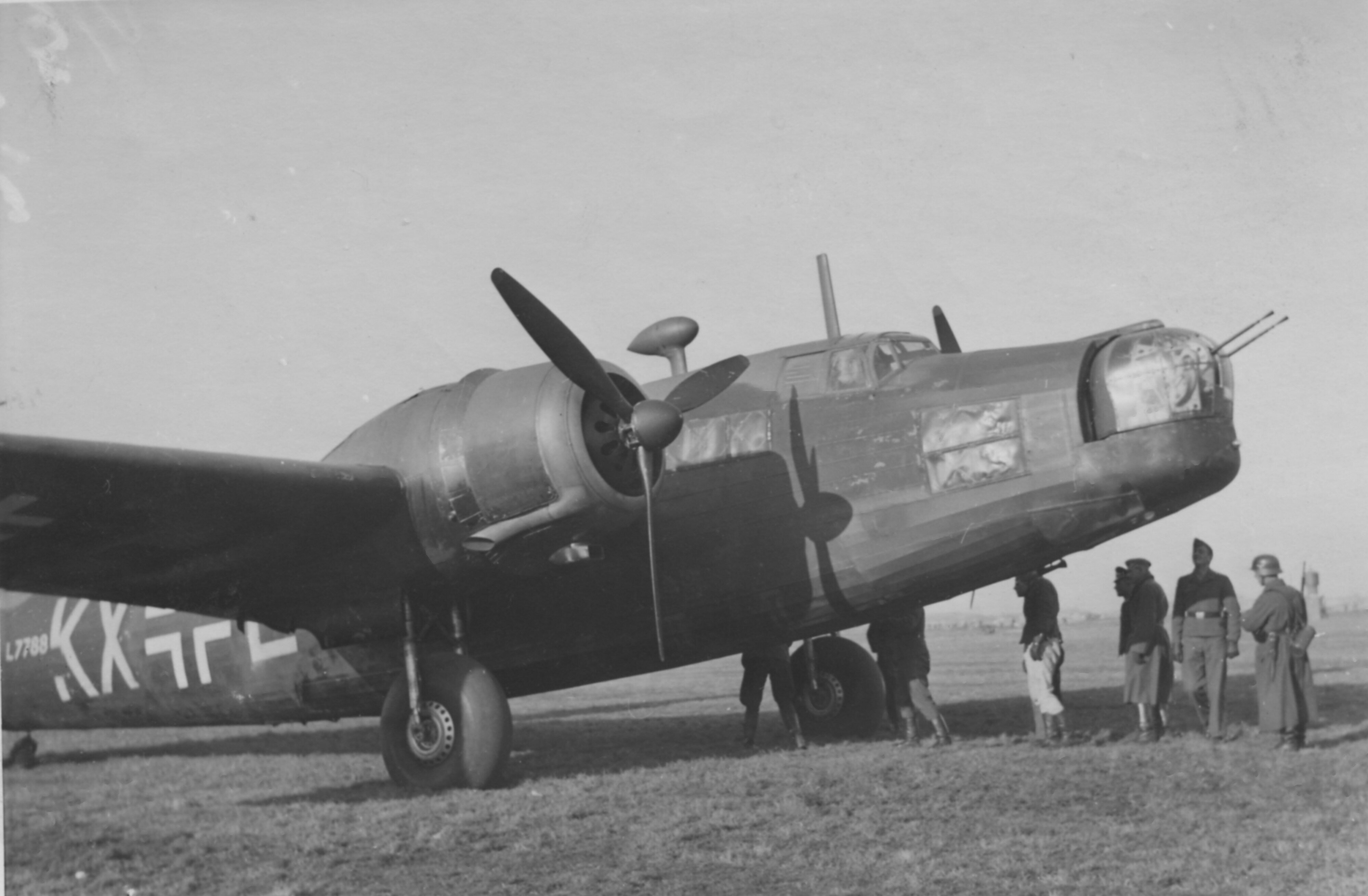
A captured Wellington L7788 in Luftwaffe service, 1940.

In 1942 the Wellington was adapted to conduct night anti-shipping torpedo attacks against German and Italian shipping in the Mediterranean. The torpedo-carrying Wellington was nicknamed the "Fishington", and the radar equipped Wellingtons that guided the torpedo carrying aircraft onto their target were dubbed the "Snoopington". 38 Squadron, based in Shallufah, Egypt had a detachment of Wellingtons operating from RAF Luqa in Malta conducting anti-shipping operations with torpedoes during 1942.

The Wellington was also adopted by RAF Coastal Command, in which it contributed to the Battle of the Atlantic. The Mark IC in Coastal had an endurance of over 10 hours at a cruising speed of 125 knots (144 mph) carrying 1,500 lb (680 kg) of bombs or depth charges. It was used for anti-submarine operations; on 6 July 1942, a Wellington sank its first enemy vessel. In 1944, Wellingtons of Coastal Command were sent to Greece and performed various support duties during the British intervention in the Greek Civil War. A few Wellingtons were operated by the Hellenic Air Force.

While the Wellington was superseded in the European Theatre as more four engined bombers arrived in service, it remained in operational service for much of the war in the Middle East and still formed a key part of the RAF's Mediterranean forces as the allies moved into Italy, with some still serving in March 1945 carrying out bombing raids and dropping supplies to partisans across Southern Europe.

In 1942, Wellingtons based in India became the RAF's first long-range bombers operating in the Far East with the arrival of 99 and 215 Squadrons RAF, providing much needed bombing support for the next two years before being withdrawn and replaced by Liberators in the summer of 1944. Wellingtons were also used for maritime patrols over the Indian Ocean by 36, and later, 203 Squadrons RAF.

The Wellington also served in anti-submarine duties off the African coast with 26 Squadron SAAF based in Takoradi, Gold Coast (now Ghana), and the Free French 344 Squadron from Dakar.

=== Mine clearance ===
Specialised "Directional Wireless Installation" (DWI), a cover story for the true purpose of the hoop variants, fitted with a 48 ft (15 m) diameter metal hoop, were used for exploding German magnetic mines by generating a powerful magnetic field as it passed over them. The first successful mine detonation occurred on 8 January 1940 followed by a second on 13 January. In the latter the aircraft flew below the safe 35 ft (11 m) altitude and was caught in the explosive blast though remained flyable. The hoop was an aluminium coil in an aerodynamic balsa case; turrets were faired over and unnecessary equipment removed to reduce weight. The first mine detonation unit No. 1 GRU at RAF Manston was joined by a second (No. 2 GRU) at RAF Bircham Newton. To protect the unarmed Wellingtons, Bristol Blenheims of No. 600 Squadron RAF flew escort during the Battle of France. One DWI was detached to the Middle East to act as the pattern for conversion of Wellingtons there. They were used for clearing the Suez Canal Zone and, later during the North Africa campaign, ports along the coast.

=== Anti-submarine ===
For the development of what became the Leigh Light, Wing Commander Humphrey de Verd Leigh fitted a 24-inch search light in the 'dustbin' turret of a DWI Wellington testing it from January 1941. This prototype substituted batteries for the engine and generator setup to reduce weight and this carried forward into production Leigh Light-equipped Wellingtons. Together with accurate radar altimeters, Wellingtons could fly safely down to 50 ft (15 m), illuminating the target submarine at around half a mile away just as the air-to-surface-vessel (ASV) radar lost the target among returns from the water's surface.

=== Airborne radar ===
In late 1944, a radar-equipped Wellington XIV from 407 Sqn. RCAF was modified for use by the RAF's Fighter Interception Unit as what would now be described as an airborne early warning and control aircraft. It operated at an altitude of 4,000 ft (1,200 m) over the North Sea to control a de Havilland Mosquito and a Bristol Beaufighter fighter intercepting Heinkel He 111 bombers flying from Dutch airbases and carrying out airborne launches of the V-1 flying bomb. The FIU operators on the Wellington would search for the He 111 aircraft climbing to launch altitude, then direct the Beaufighter to attack the bomber, while the Mosquito would attempt to intercept the V-1 if it was launched.

== Variants ==
=== Bomber variants ===
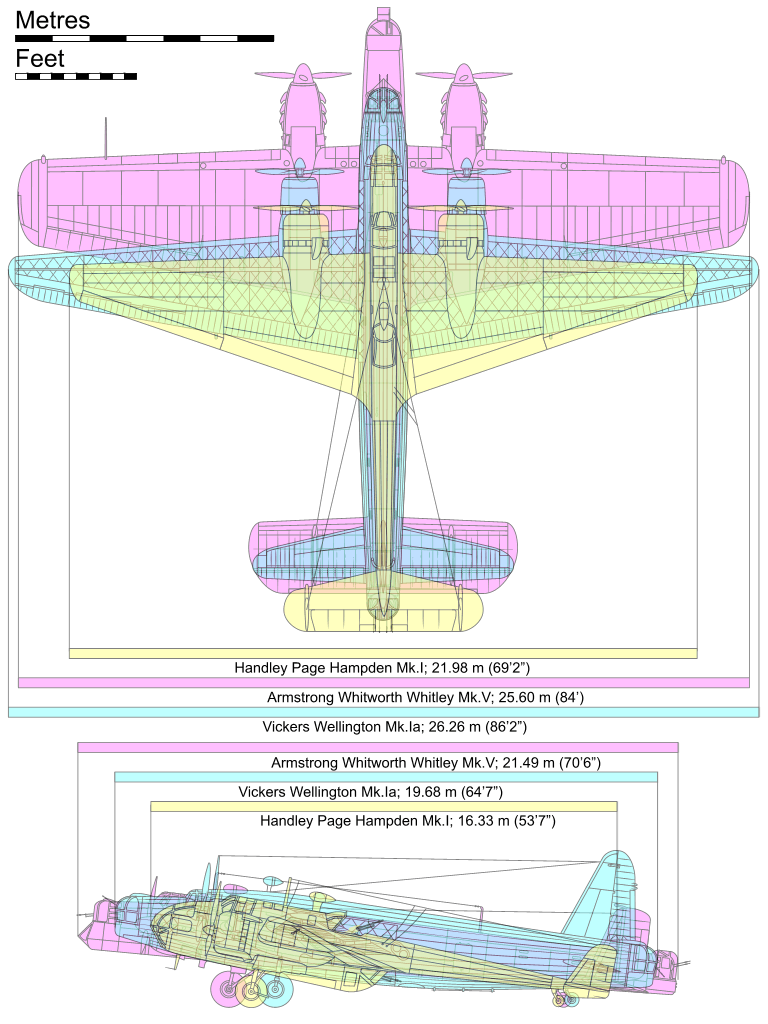
Scale comparison diagram of the trio of British twin-engined medium bombers at the outbreak of the Second World War: Wellington (blue), Handley Page Hampden (yellow) and Armstrong Whitworth Whitley (pink).

Type 271
The first Wellington bomber prototype.

Type 285 Wellington Mark I
One pre-production prototype. Powered by two Bristol Pegasus X radial piston engines.

Type 290 Wellington Mark I
The first production version. Powered by two 1,000 hp (750 kW) Bristol Pegasus XVIII radial piston engines. Fitted with Vickers gun turrets, 183 built at Weybridge and Broughton in Flintshire.

Type 408 Wellington Mark IA
Production version built to B Mark II specifications with provision for either Pegasus or Rolls-Royce Merlin engines, although only 1,000 hp (750 kW) Pegasus XVIII engines were used in practice. Main landing gear moved forward 3 in (8 cm). Fitted with Nash & Thompson gun turrets. 187 built at Weybridge and Broughton in Flintshire.

Type 416 Wellington Mark IC
The first main production variant was the Mark IC which added waist guns to the Mark IA. A total of 2,685 were produced. The Mark IC had a crew of six: a pilot, radio operator, navigator/bomb aimer, observer/nose gunner, tail gunner and waist gunner. A total of 2,685 were built at Weybridge, Broughton in Flintshire and Blackpool.

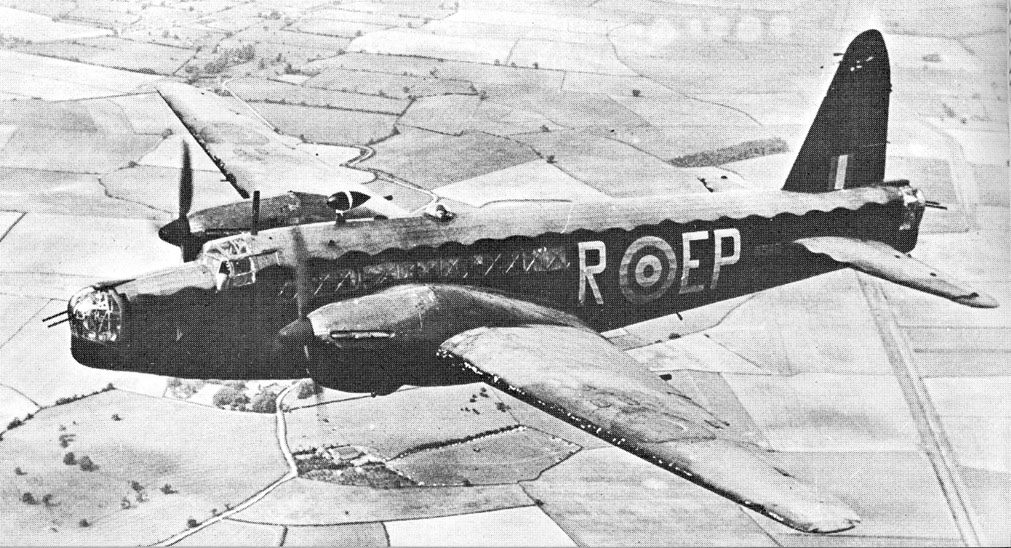
Merlin-engined Wellington Mark II of No. 104 Sqn. The criss-cross geodetic construction can be seen through the perspex panels in the side of the fuselage.

Type 406 Wellington Mark II
The B Mark II was identical to the Mark IC with the exception of the powerplant; using the 1,145 hp (855 kW) Rolls-Royce Merlin X engine instead. A total of 401 were produced at Weybridge.

Type 417 Wellington B Mark III
The next significant variant was the B Mark III which featured the 1,375 hp (1,025 kW) Bristol Hercules III or XI engine and a four-gun tail turret, instead of two-gun. A total of 1,519 Mark IIIs were built, becoming mainstays of Bomber Command from late 1941 through into 1942, with all but the two prototypes being built at Broughton in Flintshire and at Blackpool. After trials in 1942, the Wellington III was cleared to tow Hotspur, Hadrian and Horsa gliders, although this was observed to have an adverse effect on the geodetic structure. The Wellington III was also seen over Salisbury Plain while towing Spitfires. This would have allowed Spitfire reinforcements for the defence of Malta to be towed from Gibraltar to within range of Malta before being released. Whether this was done is unconfirmed.

Type 424 Wellington B Mark IV
The 220 B Mark IV Wellingtons used the 1,200 hp (900 kW) Pratt & Whitney Twin Wasp engine and were flown by two Polish and two RAAF squadrons. A total of 220 were built at Broughton in Flintshire.

Type 442 Wellington B Mark VI
Pressurised with a long wingspan and 1,600 hp (1,190 kW) Merlin R6SM (60-series, two-stage) engines, 63 were produced and were operated by 109 Squadron and as Gee radio navigation trainers. A total of 63 were built at Weybridge. Fitted with Sperry bombsight. The B.VI's high-altitude fuselage design optimised for pressurisation had a solid, bullet-like nose with no nose turret, and a cockpit with an astrodome-like bubble canopy. The rear turret was a remotely operated FN.20 sighted from a dome in the cockpit. (Note: The original design included a pressurised rear turret but Parnall were not able to deliver the FN.70.) This is the aircraft that spurred Rolls-Royce into developing the two-stage supercharged Merlin 60-series engine.

Type 440 Wellington B Mark X
The most widely produced variant of which 3,804 were built. It was similar to the Mark III except for the 1,675 hp (1,250 kW) Hercules XVIII powerplant. The Mark X was the basis for a number of Coastal Command versions. A total of 3,803 were built at Broughton in Flintshire and Blackpool.

=== Coastal Command variants ===
Type 429 Wellington General Reconnaissance (GR) Mark VIII
Mark IC conversion for Coastal Command service. Roles included reconnaissance, anti-submarine and anti-shipping attack. A Coastal Command Wellington was the first aircraft to be fitted with the anti-submarine Leigh light. A total of 307 were built at Weybridge, 58 fitted with the Leigh light.

Type 458 Wellington GR Mark XI
Maritime version of B Mark X with an ordinary nose turret, mast ASV Mark II radar and no waist guns, 180 built at Weybridge and Blackpool.

Type 455 Wellington GR Mark XII
Maritime version of B Mark X armed with torpedoes (two 18-inch carried under wings). Redesigned nose to accommodate centrimetric ASV Mark III radar which had a radome in the chin position rather than external aerials. Twin flexible machine guns in a clear canopy replaced the front turret. Leigh light in bomb bay. Hercules VI or XVI engines. 58 built at Weybridge and Broughton in Flintshire.

Type 466 Wellington GR Mark XIII
Maritime version of B Mark X with an ordinary nose turret and mast ASV Mark II radar instead of chin radome, no waist guns. Hercules XVII engines of 1,735 hp (1,294 kW). 844 built – 2 at Weybridge and rest at Blackpool.

Type 467 Wellington GR Mark XIV
Maritime version of B Mark X with a chin radome housing the ASV Mark III radar and RP-3 explosive rocket rails under the wings. Hercules XVII engines 841 built at Weybridge, Broughton and Blackpool.

=== Transport variants ===
Wellington C Mark XV
Service conversions of the Wellington Mark IA into unarmed transport aircraft; able to carry up to 18 troops.

Wellington C Mark XVI
Service conversions of the Wellington Mark IC into unarmed transport aircraft; able to carry up to 18 troops.

=== Trainer variants ===
Type 487 Wellington T Mark XVII
Service conversion of a Wellington Mk XI bomber into nightfighter training aircraft with SCR720 Air Intercept radar in a bulbous nose and rear turret removed and faired over; powered by two Bristol Hercules XVII radial piston engines.

Type 490 Wellington T Mark XVIII
Production version. For training wireless operators and navigators Powered by two Bristol Hercules XVI radial piston engines. A total of 80 were built at Blackpool, plus some conversions.

Wellington T Mark XIX
Service conversions of the Wellington Mark X used for bomber crew training; remained in use as a trainer until 1953.

Type 619 Wellington T Mark X
Postwar conversions of the Wellington Bomber into training aircraft by Boulton Paul in Wolverhampton. For navigation training the front turret was removed and replaced by a fairing and the interior re-equipped. Some were sold to France and Greek Royal Hellenic Air Force (6) in 1946.

=== Experimental and conversion variants ===
Type 298 Wellington Mark II prototype
one aircraft L4250; powered by two 1,145 hp (854 kW) Rolls-Royce Merlin inline piston engines.

Type 299 Wellington Mark III prototype
two only.

Type 407 and Type 421 Wellington Mark V
Second and first prototypes respectively: three were built, designed for pressurised, high-altitude operations using turbocharged Hercules VIII engines.

Type 410 Wellington Mark IV prototype
Serial R1220; powered by two Pratt & Whitney Twin Wasp radial piston engines.

Type 416 Wellington (II)
The original Wellington II prototype was converted with the installation of a 40 mm (1.57 in) Vickers S gun with predictor gunsight in the dorsal position. This was the planned armament to be mounted in the nose of the Vickers Type 414 twin-engined fighter for which the Air Ministry raised specification F22.39. The armament was first flown on 25 October 1940 and test fired 8 November.

Type 418 Wellington DWI (Detonation Without Impact) Mark I
Conversion of four Wellington Mark IAs to minesweeping aircraft for exploding magnetic mines. Fitted with Ford V-8 petrol engine and Mawdsley electrical generator to induce magnetic field in a 48 ft (15 m) diameter loop mounted under fuselage. They had a solid nose with a bracket supporting the loop, which was also supported under the rear fuselage and the wings, outboard of the engines. DWI was also known as "Directional Wireless Installation" – to mislead the true purpose of the loop.

Type 419 Wellington DWI Mark II
DWI Mark I aircraft upgraded by installation of de Havilland Gipsy Six engine for increased generation power. 11 aircraft were converted to this standard. They were operated by No. 1 General Reconnaissance Unit, RAF, sweeping mines in the Thames Estuary for a short time until the Royal Navy had an equivalent capability to sweep magnetic mines. The unit was transferred to Egypt for use in the Suez Canal.

Type 430 Wellington Mark VII
Single aircraft, built as a testbed for the 40 mm Vickers S gun turret.

Type 431 Wellington Mark VI
One Wellington Mark V with Merlin 60-series engines, high-altitude prototype only.

Type 435 Wellington Mark IC
conversion of one Wellington to test Turbinlite night interception searchlight.

Type 437 Wellington Mark IX
one Mark IC conversion for troop transport.

Type 439 Wellington Mark II
one Wellington Mark II converted with the installation of a 40 mm Vickers S gun in the nose.

Type 443 Wellington Mark V
One Wellington used to test the Bristol Hercules VIII engine.

Type 445 Wellington (I)
one Wellington was used to test the Whittle W2B/23 turbojet engine, the engine was fitted in the tail of the aircraft.

Type 449 Wellington Mark VIG
Production version of Type 431. Two built.

Type 454 and Type 459 Wellington Mark IX
prototypes with ASV Mark II, ASV Mark III radars, and powered by two Bristol Hercules VI and XVI radial piston engines.

Type 470 and Type 486 Wellington
Designations of two Wellington Mark II aircraft fitted with the Whittle W2B and W2/700 jet engines respectively.

Type 478 Wellington Mark X
one Wellington was used to test the Bristol Hercules 100 engine.

Type 602 Wellington Mark X
one Wellington was fitted with two Rolls-Royce Dart turboprop engines.

Wellington Mark III
one Wellington was used for glider tug, for glider clearance for Waco Hadrian, General Aircraft Hotspur and Airspeed Horsa gliders.

=== Total built ===
A total number of 11,461 aircraft is most often quoted. (Note: According to Andrews & Morgan (1988); using their own data the total is 11,462.) There is some question over several aircraft and the total may be a few either side of this figure. In combination, the Wellingtons and 846 Warwicks represent more than 75 per cent of the total number of aircraft built by the Vickers-Armstrongs company.

== Operators ==
- Australia
- Canada
- Czechoslovakia
- Free France
- France
- Germany
- Greece
- New Zealand
- Poland
- Portugal
- South Africa
- United Kingdom

== Aircraft on display ==
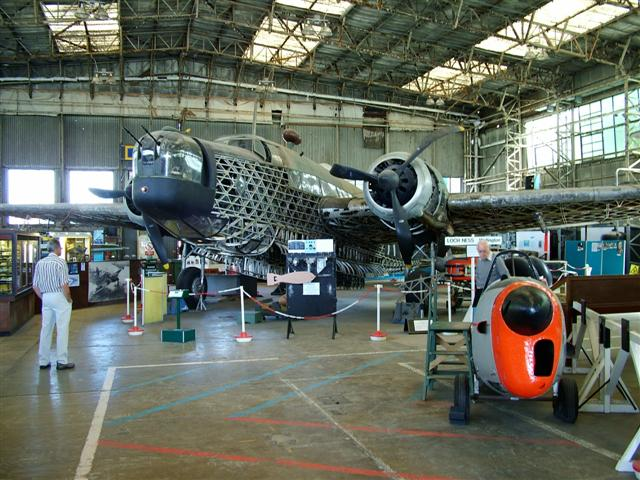
Wellington IA N2980 on display at Brooklands

There are two complete surviving Vickers Wellingtons preserved in the United Kingdom. Some other substantial parts also survive. Wellington IA serial number N2980 is owned by Brooklands Museum at Brooklands, Surrey. Built at Brooklands and first flown in November 1939, this aircraft took part in the RAF's daylight bombing raids on Germany early in the Second World War but later lost power during a training flight on 31 December 1940 and ditched in Loch Ness. All the occupants survived except the rear gunner, who was killed when his parachute failed to open. The aircraft was recovered from the bottom of Loch Ness in September 1985 and restored in the late 1980s and 1990s. A new Wellington exhibition featuring N2980 was officially opened by Robin Holmes (who led the recovery team), Penelope Keith (as trustee of Brooklands Museum), Norman Parker (who worked for Vickers) and Ken Wallis (who flew Wellingtons operationally) on 15 June 2011, the 75th anniversary of the first flight of the type's effective prototype in 1936.

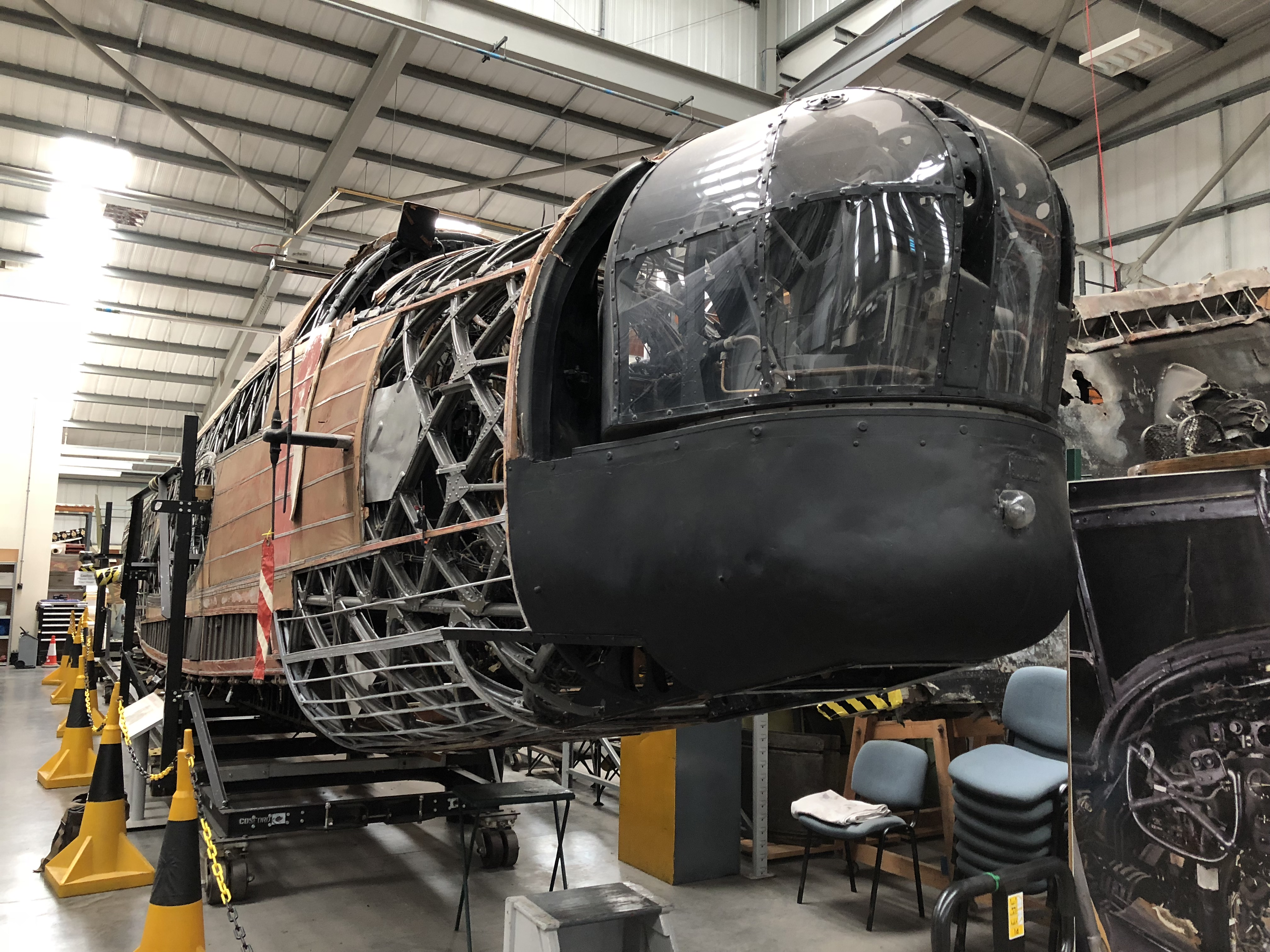
Vickers Wellington T.10 serial number MF628 undergoing restoration

On 15 September 2016, after having its outer wings removed the day before, N2980 was towed from the Bellman hangar in which it was restored and where it had been displayed for nearly 30 years. This move was the first time that 'R' for 'Robert' had moved on its undercarriage since its last flight in 1940. The aircraft was exhibited in a temporary building while the Bellman hangar was relocated and restored until taken off display and moved back into the latter building on 25 July 2017. The aeroplane is the centre-piece of the 'Brooklands Aircraft Factory' exhibition about the aircraft industry at Brooklands, which was formally opened on 13 November 2017.

Wellington T.10 serial number MF628 is held by the Royal Air Force Museum. It was delivered to RAF No.18 MU (Maintenance Unit) for storage at RAF Tinwald Downs, Dumfries, as a Wellington B.X, on 11 May 1944. In March 1948 the front gun turret was removed in its conversion to a T.10 for its role as a postwar aircrew trainer. This aircraft is the Wellington seen taking off in The Dam Busters and was also used for some air-to-air photography on the movie.

This aircraft made the last flight of a Wellington, from Aston Down to Wisley, in January 1955. The RAF Museum later refitted the front gun turret in keeping with its original build as a B.X (wartime mark numbers used Roman numerals, Arabic numerals were adopted postwar). In Autumn 2010, this aircraft was taken to the RAF Museum's site at Cosford for restoration.

== Specifications (Wellington Mark IC) ==
Wellington Mark Ia 3-view drawing, with profile views of Mark I (Vickers turrets), Mark II (Merlin engines), Mark III (Hercules engines, 4-gun tail turret), GR Mark VIII (maritime Mark Ic, metric radar) and GR Mark XIV (maritime Mark X, centimetric radar)

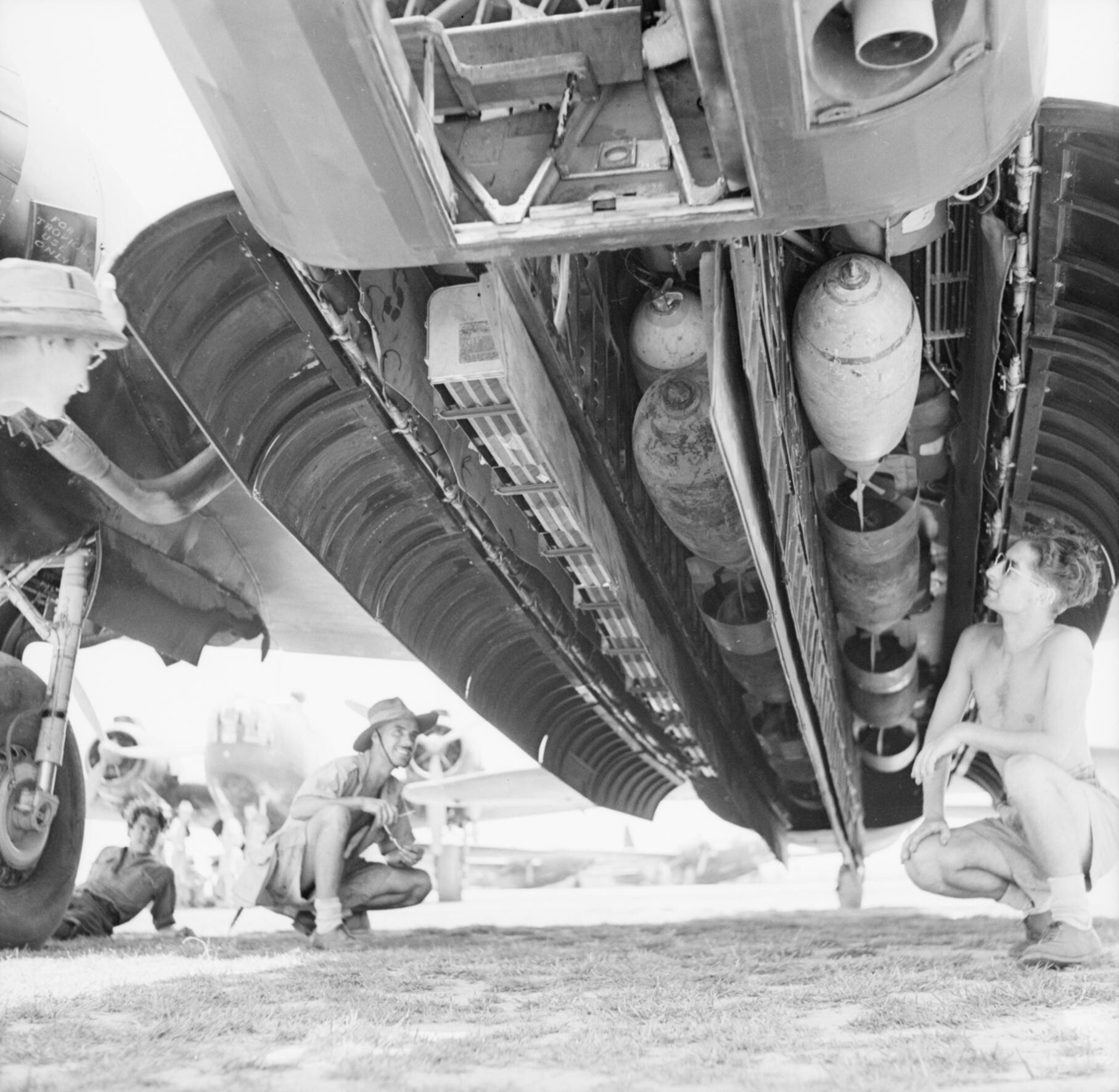
Wellington bomb bay with 500lb HE bombs and "Small Bomb Containers" of 4lb incendiaries

Data from Vickers Aircraft since 1908, The Vickers Wellington I & II

General characteristics

- Crew: five or six
- Length: 64 ft 7 in (19.69 m)
- Wingspan: 86 ft 2 in (26.26 m)
- Height: 17 ft 5 in (5.31 m)
- Wing area: 840 sq ft (78 m^{2})
- Empty weight: 18,556 lb (8,417 kg)
- Max takeoff weight: 28,500 lb (12,927 kg)
- Powerplant: 2 × Bristol Pegasus Mark XVIII radial engines, 1,050 hp (780 kW) each

Performance

- Maximum speed: 235 mph (378 km/h, 204 kn) at 15,500 ft (4,700 m)
- Range: 2,550 mi (4,100 km, 2,220 nmi)
- Service ceiling: 18,000 ft (5,500 m)
- Rate of climb: 1,120 ft/min (5.7 m/s)

Armament

- Guns: 6–8× .303 (7.7 mm) "Browning .303 Mk II" machine guns:
  - 2× in nose turret
  - 2× in tail turret (Note: 4× from Mark III onwards)
  - 2× in waist positions (Note: deleted from Mark III onwards)
- Bombs: 4,500 lb (2,000 kg) bombs

== In popular culture ==
- The Wellington was nicknamed the Wimpy by RAF personnel, after the portly J. Wellington Wimpy character from the Popeye cartoons.
- Nebeští jezdci ("Riders in the Sky") (1968), about a Czechoslovak bomber crew in the RAF, based on the real operations of No. 311 Squadron RAF.
- Pastoral, a 1944 novel by the author Nevil Shute about the crew of a Wellington
- Target for Tonight (1941), a documentary about a Wellington on a raid over Germany.
- Worker's Week-End (1943), a documentary newsreel about the construction of Vickers Wellington LN514 in record time.
- One of Our Aircraft is Missing, a 1942 British war film about the crew of a Wellington forced down in the Netherlands.
- A straight on the Silverstone Circuit is named the Wellington Straight in reference to the type being based at what was then named RAF Silverstone.
- G – for Genevieve and L for Lucy, both about fictional Polish bomber crews in the RAF during World War II, by Janusz Meissner

== See also ==
- 1942 Ruislip Wellington accident
- Dumfries and Galloway Aviation Museum

Related development

- Vickers Warwick
- Vickers VC.1 Viking

Aircraft of comparable role, configuration, and era

- Armstrong Whitworth Whitley
- Dornier Do 17
- Douglas B-18 Bolo
- Handley Page Hampden
- Heinkel He 111
- Ilyushin Il-4
- Junkers Ju 88
- North American B-25 Mitchell

Related lists

- List of aircraft of the Royal Air Force
- List of aircraft of the Royal New Zealand Air Force and Royal New Zealand Navy
- List of aircraft of World War II
