= Bowden Housteads Woods =

Nature reserve in Sheffield, England

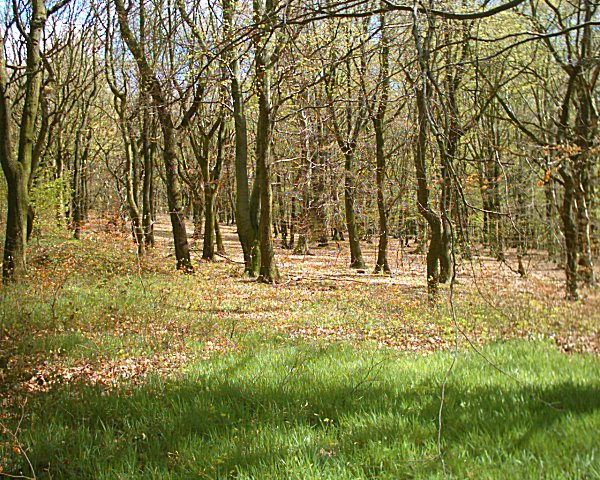
- Bowden Housteads Woods, Sheffield

- Location within South Yorkshire
- Type: woodland
- Location: between Darnall and Handsworth, Sheffield, South Yorkshire, England
- Coordinates: 53.37552°N 1.403117°W

Bowden Housteads Woods are situated between Darnall and Handsworth, Sheffield, South Yorkshire, England. The woods are encircled by Sheffield Outer Ring Road, Sheffield Parkway and Handsworth Road and are classified as ancient woodlands, having been in existence since the 17th century. The Car Brook flows through the wooded area. Spring brings a carpet of bluebells. The woods are a Local Nature Reserve.

== History ==
The 1853 Ordnance Survey map of the area shows a sandstone quarry within the woods. Many of Handsworth's older buildings were constructed using the yellow sandstone from this quarry and two others in the district. A well ("Shilling Well") is also shown on maps, close to the junction of the woods with Clifton Square and what is now Handsworth Road (originally Main Road). The 1900 map, however, shows neither of these features.

From the mid 19th century to the mid 20th century, part of the woods (now the site of an Asda supermarket) was occupied by the Fisher Son and Sibray Nurseries and the land upon which the adjacent Triangle Estate now stands, was also once part of the woods, and many of its streets are named after types of trees; Larch Hill, Willow Drive, Maple Grove, Alder Lane and Chestnut Avenue.

Local miners built an open-air swimming pool in the woods in 1926. It was fed by waters from a natural spring and surrounded by a fence made of old railway sleepers. Alterations to the Sheffield Parkway, with the addition of the Mosborough link in 1990, included the construction of a new roundabout on the site of the old pool.

The statue, Parkway Man, created by Jason Thomson, is located in the woods, close to the Sheffield Parkway.
