= Sheffield Airport =

Sheffield Airport may refer to:

- Sheffield City Airport in Sheffield, England
- Doncaster Sheffield Airport in Finningley, Doncaster, England
