= EGSY =

EGSY may refer to one of two airfields in the United Kingdom:

- Sheffield City Airport, which originally used this ICAO four-letter airport code until its closure in 2008
- MOD St Athan, which adopted this ICAO code after Sheffield City Airport closed
