= Penny Spot Beck =

Watercourse in Norfolk, England

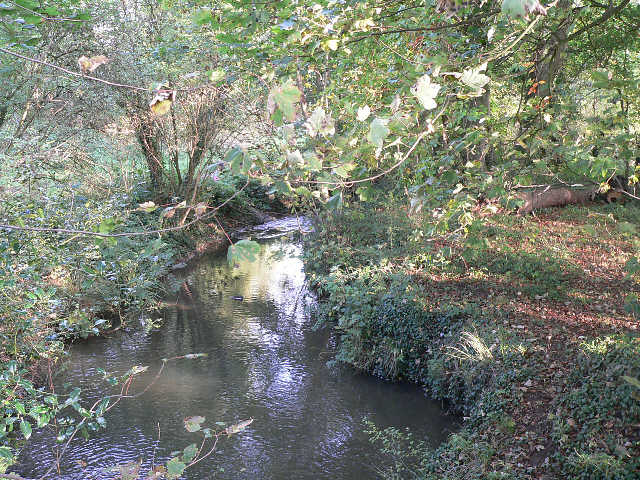
- Penny Spot Beck

- Penny Spot Beck Within Breckland

Location
- Country: England
- State: Norfolk
- Region: East of England
- District: Breckland

Physical characteristics
- Source: ½ mile south of the village of Swanton Morley
- Mouth: Merges with the River Wensum
- Length: 2.6 mi (4.2 km)

Penny Spot Beck is a minor watercourse that is entirely in the county of Norfolk. The beck rises within the parish of Dereham ½ mile south of the village of Swanton Morley (grid reference TG018150). The beck is a tributary of the River Wensum. The headwater is a small pool in a field 50 feet (15 m) south-west of the intersection of Tuddenham and Norwich roads, from here the beck flows east and then north-east across open farmland where various streams and ditches contribute to its flow. After a distance of 2.6 miles (4.2 km) it joins the River Wensum.
