= City Airport & Heliport (disambiguation) =

Several airports are referred to as City Airport & Heliport:

- Manchester Barton Aerodrome previously City Airport Manchester
- Sheffield City Airport (closed)
