= RAF Skipton-on-Swale =

Royal Air Force base in Yorkshire, England

RAF Skipton-on-Swale
- Skipton-on-Swale, North Yorkshire in England
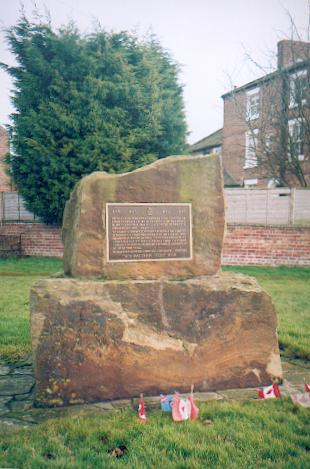

Site information
- Type: Royal Air Force satellite station
- Owner: Air Ministry
- Operator: Royal Air Force; Royal Canadian Air Force
- Controlled by: RAF Bomber Command]

Location
- Shown within North Yorkshire RAF Skipton-on-Swale (the United Kingdom)
- Coordinates: 54°13′26″N 001°25′38″W

Site history
- Built: 1942
- In use: 1942 - 1947
- Battles/wars: European theatre of World War II

Airfield information
- Elevation: 25 metres (82 ft) AMSL
Runways
| Direction | Length and surface |
|---|---|
| 00/00 | Concrete |
| 00/00 | Concrete |
| 00/00 | Concrete |

Royal Air Force Skipton-on-Swale or more simply RAF Skipton-on-Swale is a former Royal Air Force satellite station operated by RAF Bomber Command during the Second World War. The station was located at Skipton-on-Swale 4 miles (6.4 km) west of Thirsk (near the present-day junction of the A61 and A167), North Yorkshire, England. The village of Sandhutton is located just to the east. RAF Skipton-on-Swale was a sub-station of RAF Leeming.

== History ==
The airfield opened in autumn 1942, becoming operational in May 1943.

Skipton-on-Swale was originally a 4 Group facility and first hosted 420 Squadron, Royal Canadian Air Force (RCAF), which moved to RAF Middleton St. George in October 1942. Skipton was assigned to No. 6 Group, Royal Canadian Air Force (RCAF) in January 1943. RCAF squadrons stationed here included 424 Squadron, No. 432 Squadron (which moved to RAF East Moor in September 1943), and 433 Squadron. Both squadrons flew the Halifax bomber until replaced by the Lancaster in January 1945. 424 Squadron lost 52 aircraft and 433 Squadron lost 38 aircraft.

Nos. 424 and 433 Squadrons were disbanded in October 1945. After this the airfield was closed. The station was not used again and has since reverted largely to farmland. The site is home to turkey and pig farms.

In 1984, veterans of the RCAF, including survivors of the crash of an RCAF Halifax in the area, and other air force representatives and local residents, gathered in the village for a commemoration of the wartime base. A cairn to 6 Group was dedicated and a Lancaster of the Battle of Britain Memorial Flight made a flypast.

== Operational units and aircraft ==
data from
| Unit | Aircraft | Version(s) | From | To | To |
|---|---|---|---|---|---|
| No. 420 Squadron RCAF | Vickers Wellington | Mk.III | 6 August 1942 | 15 October 1942 | RAF Middleton St. George |
| No. 424 Squadron RCAF | Vickers Wellington; Handley Page Halifax; Avro Lancaster | Mk.X; Mk.III; Mks.I & III | 6 November 1943 | 15 October 1945 | Disbanded |
| No. 432 Squadron RCAF | Vickers Wellington | Mk.X | 1 May 1943 | 18 September 1943 | RAF East Moor |
| No. 433 Squadron RCAF | Handley Page Halifax; Avro Lancaster | Mk.III; Mks.I & III | 25 September 1943 | 15 October 1945 | Disbanded |

== Civilian use ==
In 2025, the charity Yorkshire Air Ambulance, which is currently based at RAF Topcliffe about 3.5 miles (5.6 km) away, started construction of a new purpose-built facility on the part of the airfield. It is being constructed on the site of the former medical centre and is planned to open in summer 2026.
