= St Mary's Church, Bagby =

Church in Bagby, North Yorkshire, England

Coordinates: 54°13′10″N 1°17′27″W

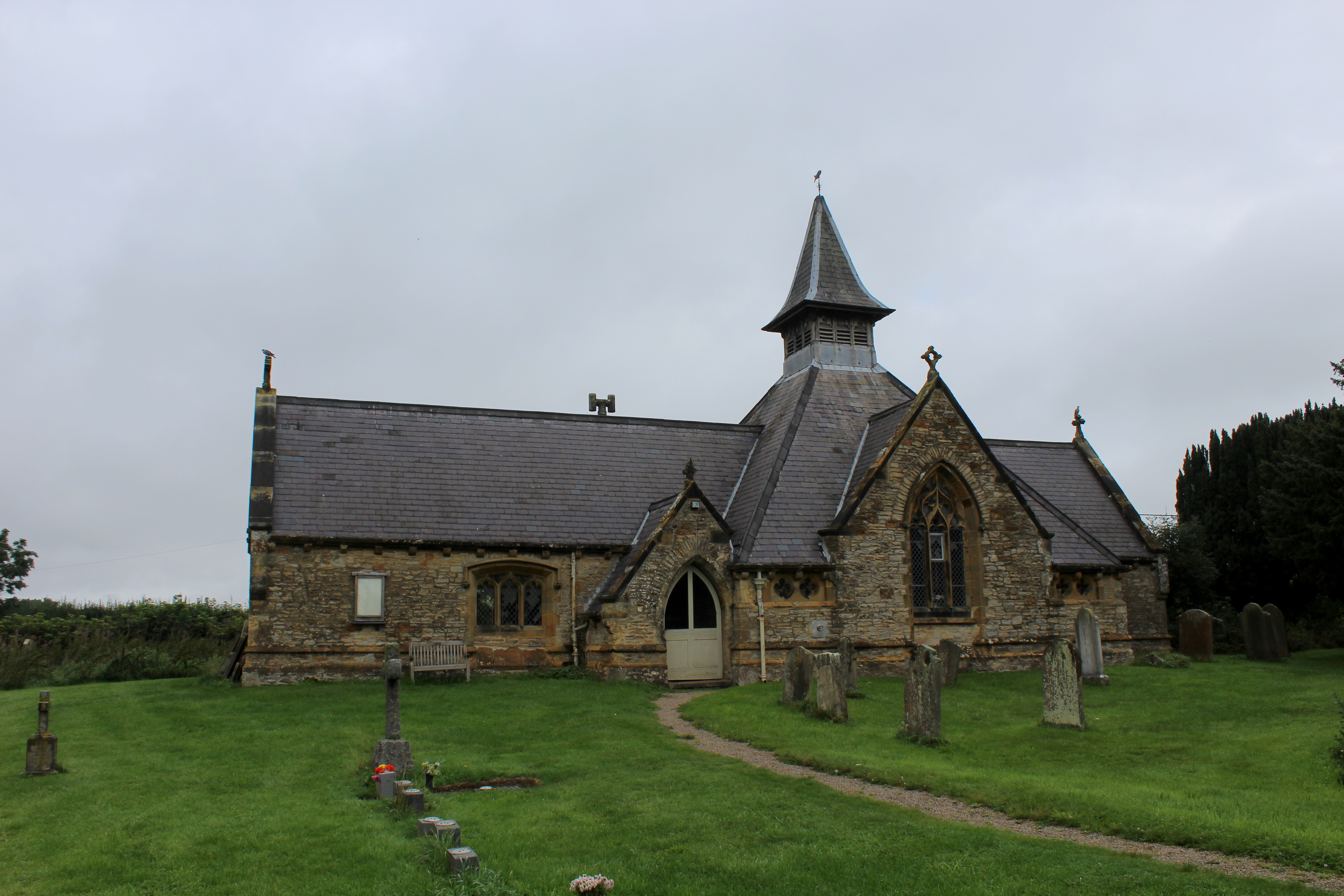
The church, in 2018

St Mary's Church is the parish church of Bagby, a village in North Yorkshire, in England.

A chapel in Bagby was recorded in the Domesday Book, and again in the 14th century. It was entirely rebuilt in 1862, to a design by Edward Buckton Lamb. It was grade II listed in 1984.

The church is built of stone, with a slate roof. It has a cruciform plan, but the crossing is wider than the nave, and the transepts are short. The chancel is very small, and the nave has a south porch. The crossing has a pyramidal roof, topped by a small tower with a spirelet. Inside, the wooden roof structure is of interest, being particularly complex around the crossing, leaving space only for small quatrefoil lights in each corner. Most of the other windows are three-light and topped with trefoils, under pointed arches, though those in the nave have flat arches.

== See also ==
- Listed buildings in Bagby
