= RAF Topcliffe =

Royal Air Force base in Yorkshire, England

RAF Topcliffe
- Topcliffe, North Yorkshire in England
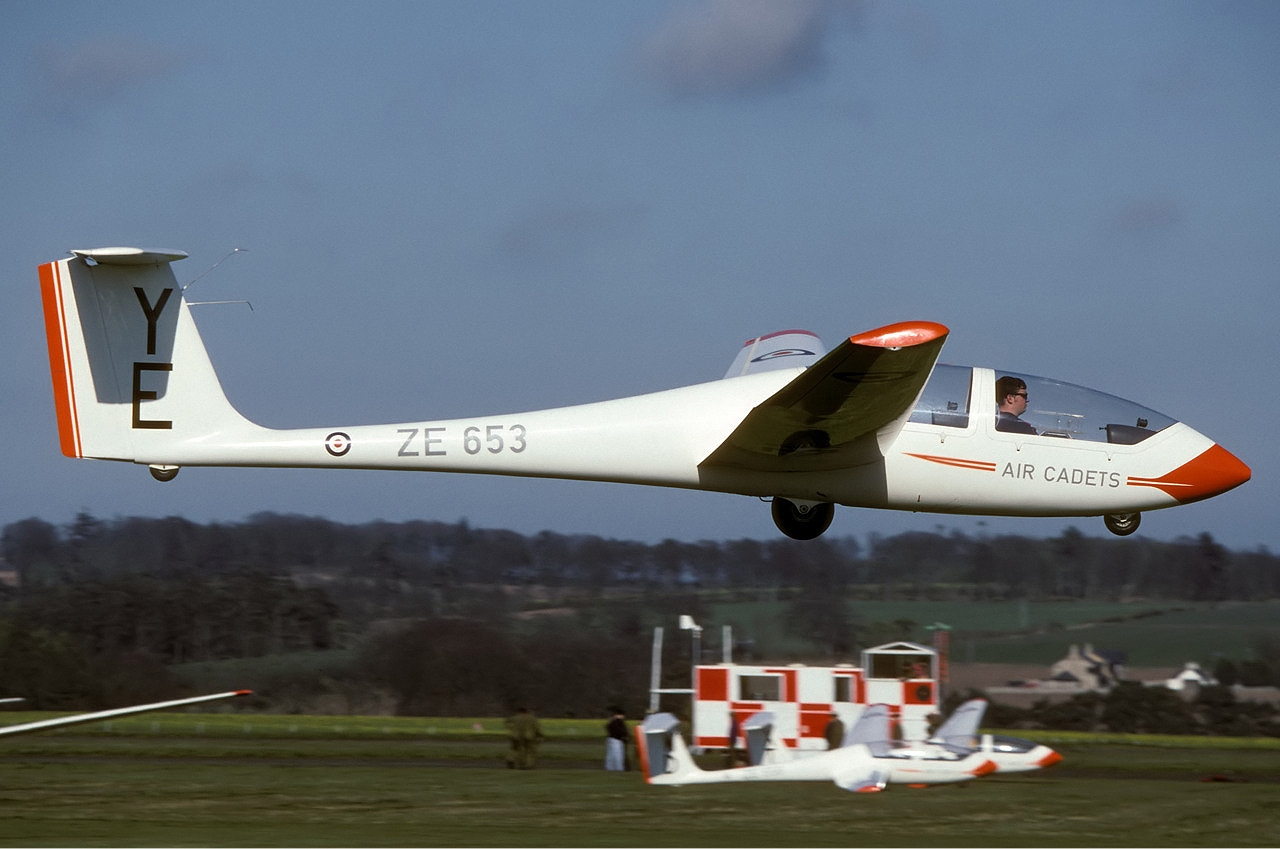
- A Grob Viking T.1, similar to the type flown by No. 645 Volunteer Gliding Squadron based at Topcliffe

Site information
- Type: Military airfield
- Code: TP
- Owner: Ministry of Defence
- Operator: Royal Air Force
- Controlled by: No. 22 Group (Training)
- Condition: Operational

Location
- Location within North Yorkshire
- Coordinates: 54°12′20″N 001°22′56″W
- Area: 117 hectares

Site history
- Built: 1939–1940
- In use: 1939 – present
- Battles/wars: Second World War; Cold War

Airfield information
- Identifiers: ICAO: EGXZ, WMO: 03265
- Elevation: 28 metres (92 ft) AMSL
Runways
Direction	Length and surface
02/20	1,826 metres (5,991 ft) Asphalt
13/31	1,256 metres (4,121 ft) Stone mastic asphalt/asphalt
- Source: UK Military Aeronautical Information Publication – Topcliffe (EGXZ)

Royal Air Force Topcliffe or RAF Topcliffe (ICAO: EGXZ) is a Royal Air Force station in North Yorkshire, England.

It was established as an RAF Bomber Command station in 1940. The British Army took over a large part of the site in 1974 and the airfield became an enclave within Alanbrooke Barracks. The last remaining RAF unit is No. 645 Volunteer Gliding Squadron which operates the Grob Viking T.1 glider.

== History ==
=== Second World War ===
Royal Air Force Topcliffe opened in September 1940 as a bomber station in RAF Bomber Command and was home to No. 77 Squadron and No. 102 (Ceylon) Squadron, both flying the Armstrong Whitworth Whitley heavy bomber. There was a decoy site at Raskelf. No. 419 Squadron and No. 424 Squadron of the Royal Canadian Air Force (RCAF) moved in flying Vickers Wellington bombers and later, the Handley Page Halifax III. On 1 January 1943 the station was transferred to No. 6 Group RCAF and became a training station. No. 61 (RCAF) Base RAF was here between 25 March 1943 and November 1944 and became No. 76 (RCAF) Base RAF with the unit disbanding on 1 September 1945, the unit controlled sub-stations at Wombleton, Dalton and Dishforth.

Units

- 801 Naval Air Squadron
- 812 Naval Air Squadron
- 813 Naval Air Squadron
- 824 Naval Air Squadron
- No. 405 Squadron RCAF between 1 and 6 March 1943 with the Halifax II
- No. 16 Blind Approach Training Flight RAF between 22 September 1941 and October 1941 became No. 1516 (Beam Approach Training) Flight RAF until 17 November 1941
- No. 102 Conversion Flight RAF between 10 June 1942 and 7 August 1942
- No. 405 Conversion Flight RAF between 7 August and 7 October 1942
- No. 1659 Heavy Conversion Unit RAF between 14 March and 16 September 1943
- No. 2805 Squadron RAF Regiment

=== Cold War ===
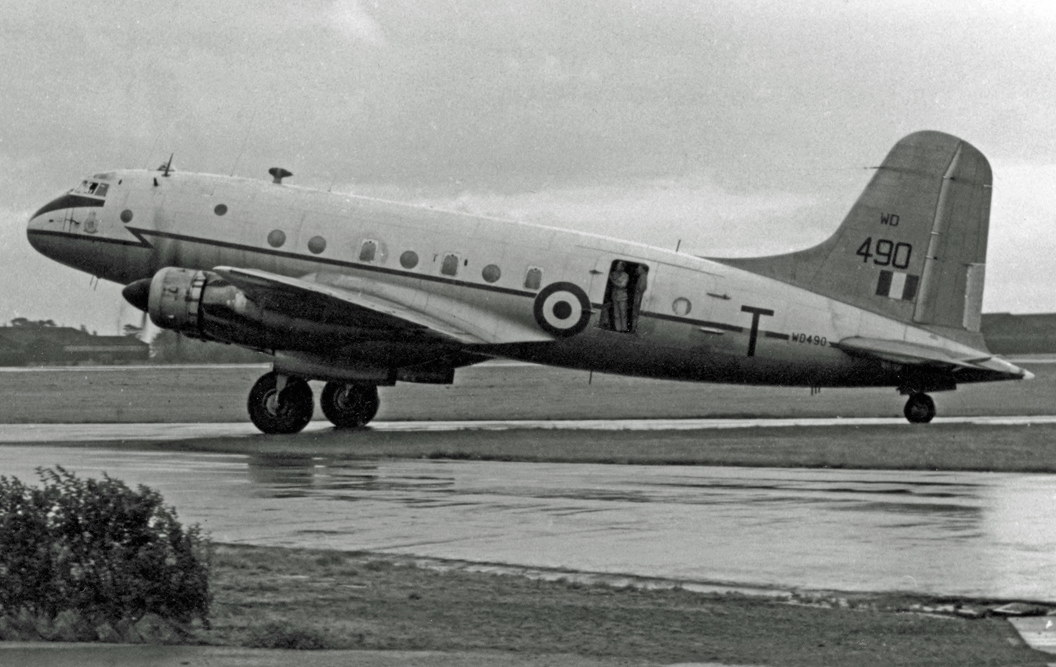
Handley Page Hastings of 24 & 47 Squadrons based at Topcliffe in 1952

No. 1 Air Navigation School was initially here between 9 April 1947 and 1 May 1954 with Wellingtons and Ansons. Navigation Staff Pilot(s) Training Flight RAF was here between October 1948 and December 1949 within No. 1 ANS. The School was reformed here and operated between 15 March 1957 and 1 December 1961.

The Air Electronics School RAF arrived on 14 January 1962 and from 30 January 1967 became the Air Electronics and Engineers School RAF, flying the Vickers Varsity T.1 until 26 October 1973.

From 1 October 1964, the Northern Communications Squadron RAF flew the Avro Anson C.19, replacing them with Beagle Basset CC.1 before the squadron departed on 6 January 1969.

The Airman Aircrew Initial Training School was located at Topcliffe from 30 January 1967 until February 1970 when it was disbanded into 6 FTS.

No. 15 Aviation Flight of the Army Air Corps flew the de Havilland Canada DHC-2 Beaver AL.1 from the early 1970s and No. 666 Aviation Squadron AAC flew Westland Scout AH.1 helicopters between 1973 and 1978.

Between 1972 and 1973, most of the station was transferred to the British Army and became Alanbrooke Barracks.

During the 1980s, Topcliffe was home of the Royal Navy Elementary Flying Training Squadron. From 24 April 1995 it was temporarily home to a Short Tucano squadron of the RAF Central Flying School. It was the home of the Tucano Air Navigation Squadron, teaching student navigators of both the RAF and the Royal Navy until 2003, when it moved to RAF Linton-on-Ouse.

During the 1990s and until 2001, the airfield was utilised by Merlin Parachute Club, home to both the 4th Battalion, Parachute Regiment parachute display team and the University of York Sport Parachute Club.

Units

- No. 24 Squadron RAF between 9 February 1951 and 6 May 1953 with the Hastings
- No. 36 Squadron RAF between 1 July 1953 and 28 February 1957 with the Lockheed Neptune MR.1
- No. 47 Squadron RAF between 22 August 1949 and 13 May 1953 with the Hastings
- No. 53 Squadron RAF between 1 August 1949 and 9 February 1951 with the Hastings
- No. 203 Squadron RAF between 15 August 1952 and 1 September 1956 with the Neptune MR.1
- No. 210 Squadron RAF between 26 September 1952 and 31 January 1957 with the Lancaster ASR.3 and Neptune MR.1
- No. 297 Squadron RAF between 22 August 1949 and 15 November 1950 with the Hastings
- No. 5 Air Navigation School RAF between 17 September 1946 and 9 April 1947.
- No. 28 Gliding School RAF between February 1948 and February 1949
- Relief Landing Ground for No. 242 Operational Conversion Unit RAF from 1 April 1958
- No. 1453 Flight RAF between 5 May 1953 and 30 June 1956
- Aircrew Holding Unit RAF between 9 December 1966 and 26 November 1970

=== 21st century ===
No. 645 Volunteer Gliding Squadron moved to the airfield in 2003, after their previous home at the former RAF Catterick became increasingly unusable.

No. 635 Volunteer Gliding Squadron also operated from Topcliffe from 2009 when it moved from its former home at RAF Samlesbury. The unit disbanded in 2016 as part of the relaunch of air cadet aviation.

RAF Topcliffe was a satellite station which served in the role of a Relief Landing Ground for Short Tucano T.1 aircraft of No. 1 Flying Training School previously based nearby at RAF Linton-on-Ouse (one of two, the other being Dishforth Airfield).

Tucano Element of No. 6 Flying Training School RAF between April 1995 and March 1996 and Joint Elementary Flying Training School RAF between 1 April 1993 and 1 April 1995.

In 2012, Yorkshire Air Ambulance moved their second base to RAF Topcliffe from nearby Bagby Airfield.

== Role and operations ==
Since the British Army took over a large part of the site in 1974 to establish Alanbrooke Barracks, the airfield is now enclosed within the Barracks.

The last remaining RAF unit based at Topcliffe is No. 645 Volunteer Gliding Squadron, which teaches Air Cadets to fly the Grob Viking T.1.

As of March 2012, the station is the permanent base of G-YOAA one of the two Yorkshire Air Ambulances.

== Based units ==
Units based at RAF Topcliffe.

=== Royal Air Force ===
No. 22 Group (Training) RAF

- No. 2 Flying Training School
  - No. 645 Volunteer Gliding Squadron

=== Civilian ===
Yorkshire Air Ambulance operates an Airbus H145 and has its base in the former control tower. In 2025, the charity started construction of a new purpose-built replacement facility 3.5 miles (5.6 km) away on part of the former RAF Skipton-on-Swale airfield. It is planned to open in summer 2026.

== See also ==
- List of Royal Air Force stations
