= Parkway Man =

Statue in Sheffield, United Kingdom

Coordinates: 53.374°N 1.405°W

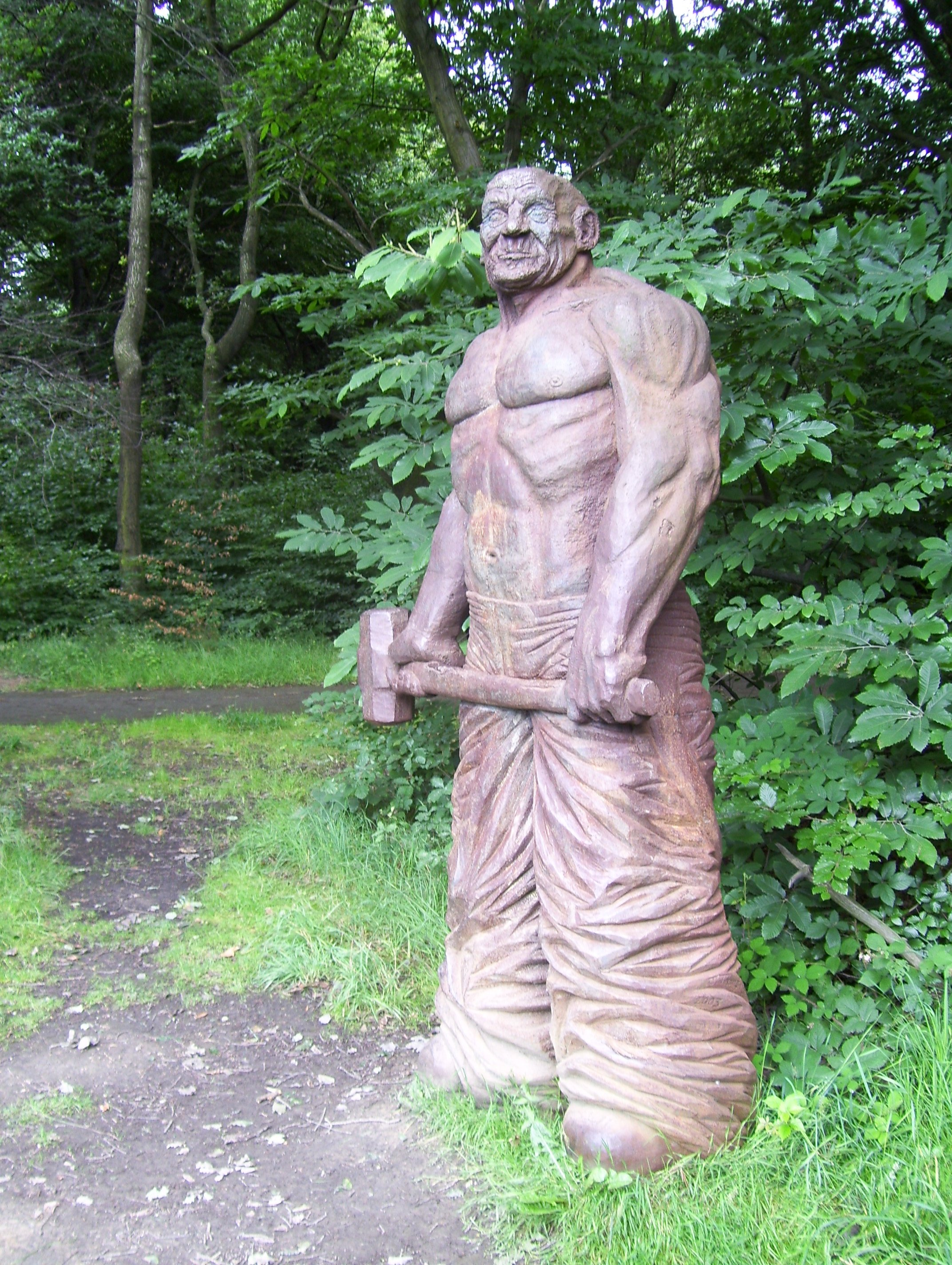
Parkway Man

The Parkway Man, also known locally as "Iron Henry" (even though it represents a steelworker) is a statue located in Bowden Housteads Woods in the Handsworth district of Sheffield, England. The statue is visible from the road, and can be seen by people driving on Sheffield Parkway. The statue can also be viewed using public footpaths in the woods.

The statue, made of cast iron and designed by Jason Thomson in 2001, depicts a large man, stripped to the waist and wielding a sledgehammer; it weighs over 3 tonnes and is over 3 metres high. It was originally commissioned by the Sheffield City Council Heritage Woodland Team, as part of a project known as the Fuelling a Revolution project, which was managed by various environmental groups in the area. H.Downs & Sons Ltd. are responsible for designing and casting the statue.
