= Listed buildings in Bagby =

Bagby is a civil parish in the county of North Yorkshire, England. It contains seven listed buildings that are recorded in the National Heritage List for England. All the listed buildings are designated at Grade II, the lowest of the three grades, which is applied to "buildings of national importance and special interest". The parish contains the village of Bagby and the surrounding countryside, and the listed buildings consist of houses, farmhouses, a former smithy, a church and an entrance gateway.

== Buildings ==
Name and location	Photograph	Date	Notes
Bagby Hall; 54.21785°N 1.28997°W	—	1660–70 (probable)	A house that has been much altered, it is in reddish-brown brick, on a plinth, with a string course and a cement tile roof. There are two storeys and an L-shaped plan, with a front range of four bays. Above the doorway is an arched opening, in the south gable are oval windows, and the other windows are modern.
East Farmhouse; 54.21887°N 1.28808°W	—	18th century	The house was extended in the 19th century, and has pantile roofs. The original part is in reddish-brown brick with a floor band. It has two storeys and two bays, and contains horizontally-sliding sash windows, and a doorway which is blocked. The later part to the right is in brown brick, it is taller, and has two storeys and a single bay, a doorway with an oblong fanlight, and sash windows.
Griffin Farmhouse; 54.20646°N 1.29720°W		18th century	The farmhouse is in reddish-brown brick and has a pantile roof. There are two storeys and three bays. On the front is a gabled porch, and the windows are horizontally-sliding sashes.
Split Farthing Hall; 54.21929°N 1.29396°W	—	18th century	A house in reddish-brown brick with a string course, dentilled eaves and a pantile roof. There are two storeys and four bays, with a later two-bay extension to the south. In the garden front are French doors, and sash windows in moulded surrounds, and at the rear are horizontally-sliding sashes.
Thirsk Lodge; 54.20475°N 1.29382°W		c.1780	The entrance gateway to Thirkleby Hall, now demolished. It is in stone, and consists of a central round arch with a pediment containing a chimney, and with a mask keystone, and paterae in the spandrels. This flanked by side wings and later extensions containing sash windows. A cornice runs across the wings to end pilasters.
Smithy Farmhouse and former smithy 54.21760°N 1.29125°W		Late 18th to early 19th century	The farmhouse and former smithy have pantile roofs. The house is rendered, and has two storeys and two bays. To the right of the doorway is a modern window, and the other windows are sashes. The former smithy to the left has two storeys, two bays and a single-storey extension to the left. It contains a doorway, two windows to the left with horseshoe-like surrounds, and sash windows above. In the extension are garage doors.
St Mary's Church; 54.21933°N 1.29080°W		1860–62	The church, designed by E. B. Lamb, is built in stone with a slate roof. It has a cruciform plan, consisting of a nave, a south porch, short north and south transepts, and a small chancel. The church is wider at the crossing, and has a truncated pyramidal roof, surmounted by a bell turret and a concave-sided spirelet.
