= Yorkshire Air Ambulance =

English charity air ambulance

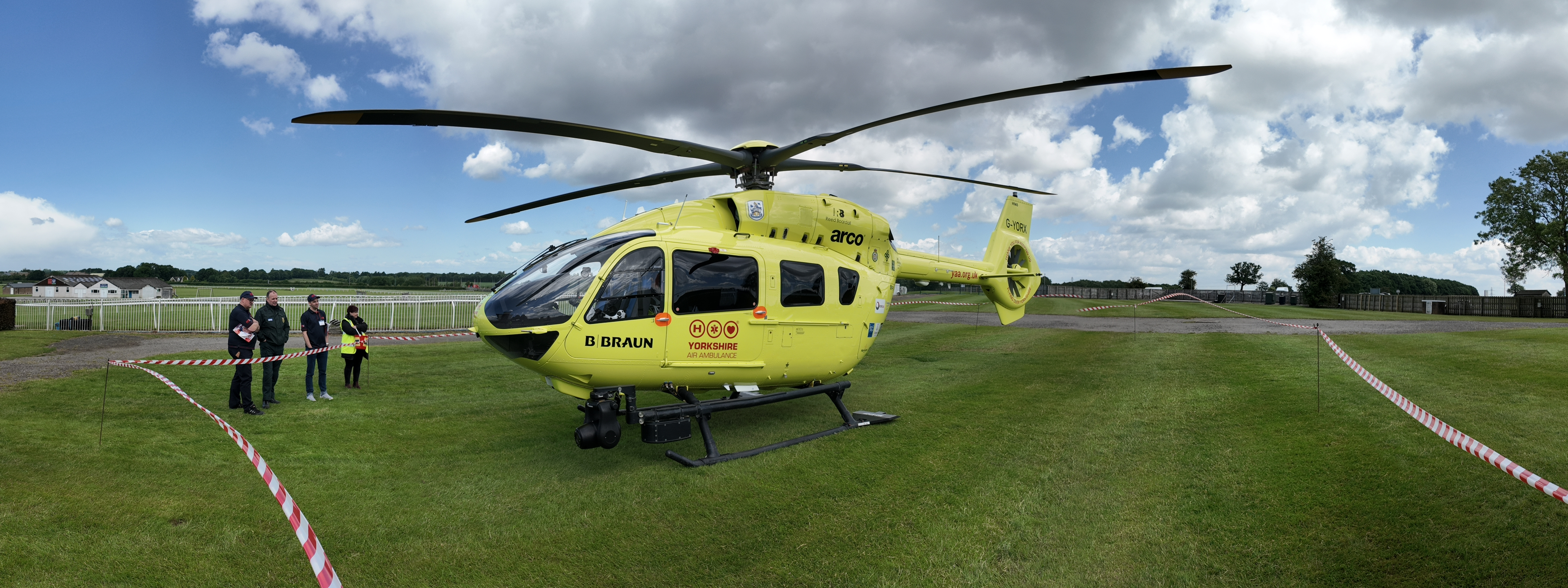
- Yorkshire Air Ambulance H145 G-YORX at Wetherby Racecourse
- Founded: 5 October 2000
- Type: Charitable organisation
- Registration no.: 1084305
- Location(s): Nostell Air Support Unit, West Yorkshire; RAF Topcliffe, Thirsk
- Aircraft operated: Airbus H145
- Revenue: £13.2 million (2024)
- Staff: 50 (2024)
- Volunteers: 165 (2024)
- Website: www.yorkshireairambulance.org.uk

Yorkshire Air Ambulance (YAA) is a dedicated helicopter emergency air ambulance for the Yorkshire and the Humber region of England. It was established in October 2000, and currently operates three Airbus H145 aircraft. It is an independent charity that relies solely on the donations of individuals and organisations.

== History ==
The charity's main base is located at Nostell Priory (having previously been located at Leeds Bradford Airport) and they have landing pads at various major hospitals around the region including Leeds General Infirmary, Hull Royal Infirmary Northern General Hospital and James Cook University Hospital in Middlesbrough. The service also lands at local Trauma Units including Huddersfield Royal Infirmary, Pinderfields Hospital and York Hospital, these sites require a short distance secondary ambulance transfer. In October 2007, a second base was opened at Sheffield City Airport. The airport then closed at the end of April 2008, but a heliport facility was still provided for the use of the air ambulance and the South Yorkshire Police helicopter. In November 2010, the operational base for the Sheffield-based aircraft was moved to Bagby Airfield near Thirsk. The second aircraft then made another move in March 2012 to RAF Topcliffe, which it shares with the 645 Volunteer Gliding Squadron.

In 2012, planning permission was granted for a new operating base within the Nostell Priory estate for the Yorkshire Air Ambulance. The new site, including a hangar and aircrew accommodation, became operational in 2013. It replaced the facility at Leeds Bradford Airport.

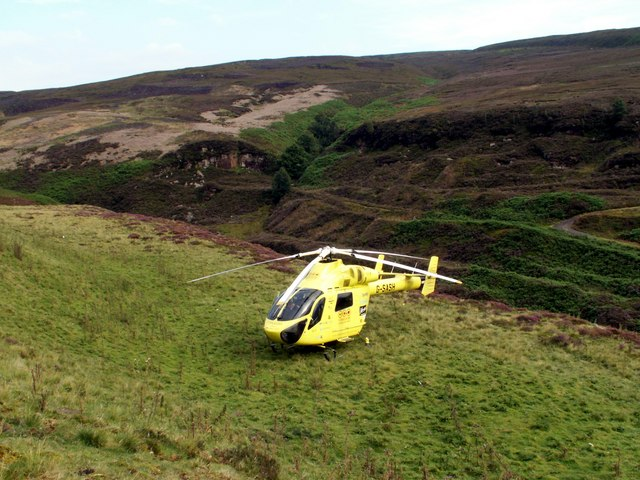
Former helicopter MD 902 Explorer G-SASH in Derbyshire

One helicopter (formerly Helimed 99, registration G-SASH) was based at a hangar at Leeds Bradford Airport (EGNM), which enabled servicing and maintenance to be carried out overnight, leading to even quicker response times in many parts of the county. Until 2016, the helicopter was located at Nostell Priory near Wakefield, where it had a newly renovated hangar and accommodation for crew, plus offices on site. The aircraft was then replaced by G-YAAC (Helimed 99), a new £6 million Airbus H145.

The second helicopter (Helimed 98, registration G-CEMS) was originally based at Sheffield City Airport but moved in March 2012 to RAF Topcliffe near Thirsk. A spokesman for the charity commented: "What we're looking to do is provide the very best coverage for the whole of Yorkshire, for the five million population. The people of Yorkshire are better served with an aircraft at Thirsk and one at Leeds Bradford." In 2016, the second helicopter was replaced by G-YOAA as part of the air ambulance's fleet renewal programme.

In 2025, the charity started construction of a new purpose-built facility 3.5 miles (5.6 km) away from the Topcliffe base, which it will replace, on the part of the former RAF Skipton-on-Swale airfield. It is planned to open in summer 2026.

== Aircraft ==
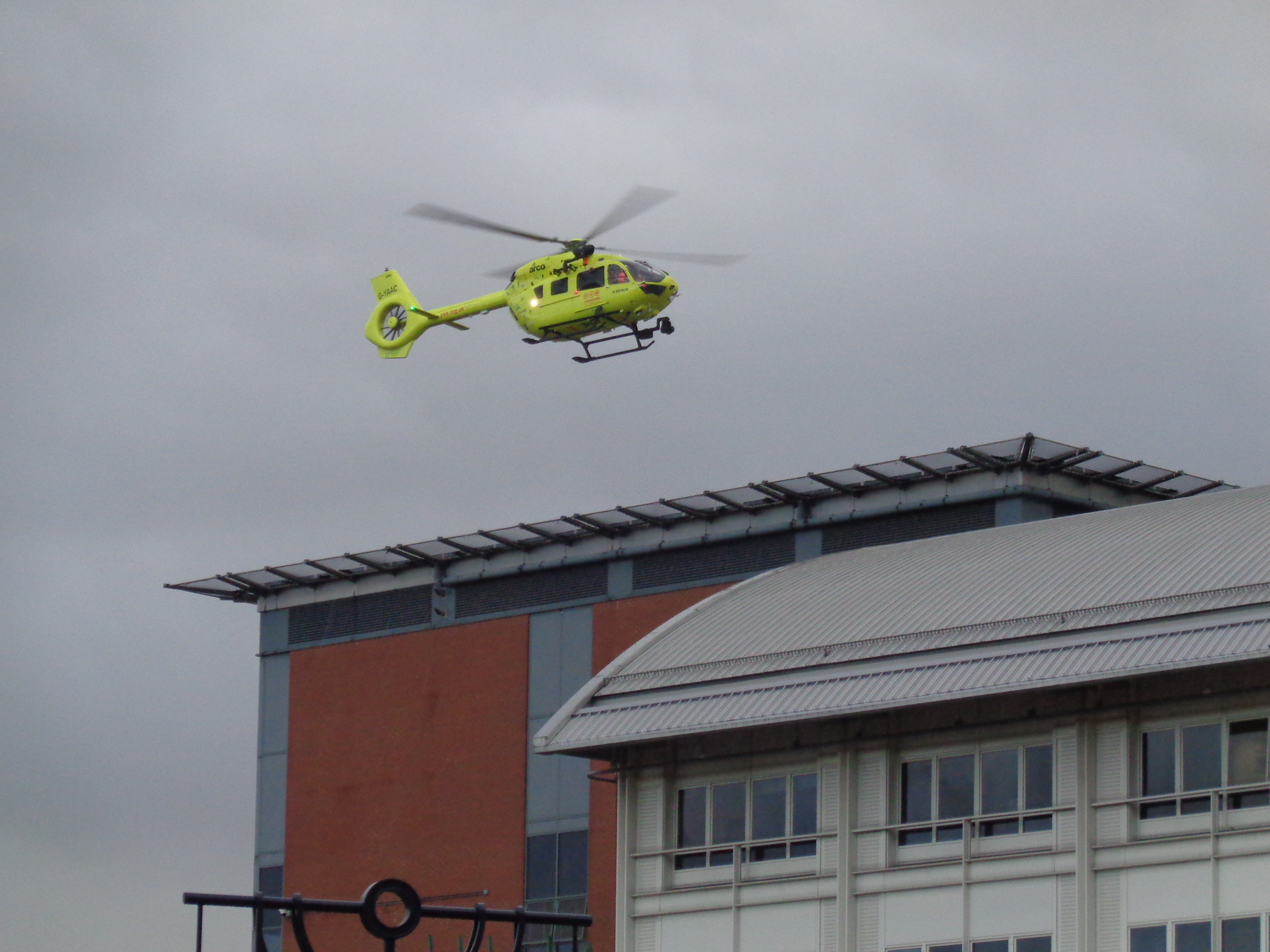
Airbus H145 G-YAAC landing at Leeds General Infirmary.

The first helicopter was an MBB Bo 105, and later in 2005, the charity began operating the MD 902 Explorer. The Explorer was used extensively in an air ambulance capacity throughout the UK, but has gradually being phased out of service for renewal purpose.

In 2016, the two existing helicopters were replaced by two new Airbus H145, which are registered as G-YAAC (based at Nostell Priory) and G-YOAA (based at RAF Topcliffe). The new H145 helicopters cost at total of £12 million and offer lower operational and maintenance costs, as well as having night capability enabling longer hours of operation.

The air ambulances appeared on the BBC One programme Helicopter Heroes, on Countryside 999 in series 3, and on UKTV's Helicopter ER.

In March 2023, the charity acquired a new five-bladed H145 D3 helicopter, G-YAAA. It was joined in June 2023 by a second H145 D3, G-YORX. The helicopters G-YAAC and G-YOAA were then retired from the charity.

In December 2024, the charity acquired an additional H145 D3, G-YAIR.

== Finances ==
The Yorkshire Air Ambulance is a charity solely maintained by donations as it receives no form of official funding. Medical and paramedic staff, however, are provided by local hospitals and the Yorkshire Ambulance Service. The resident population and visitors to Yorkshire finance the air ambulance by donations, and various fund-raising events. In the year ending March 2024, the charity raised £13.2 million. It spent £7.7 million, of which £5.5 million was used to operate the air ambulance service.

Through the mid-2000s, Mumtaz Group of Bradford decided to give £2,000 a month for the foreseeable future.

YAA were the kit sponsor of Huddersfield Town F.C. for the 2009-10 season.

=== Richard Hammond's 2006 dragster crash ===
In September 2006, the original helicopter was involved in transporting the Top Gear presenter Richard Hammond following his high-speed accident at the former-RAF Elvington airfield near York. Following this operation, a high-profile charity appeal was launched. By 16 October, contributions to the appeal amounted to £185,770, although payment authorisation of one donation of £50,000 was declined.

== See also ==
- Air ambulances in the United Kingdom
- Great North Air Ambulance
