= St Mary's Church, Handsworth, Sheffield =

Coordinates: 53.371131°N 1.38443°W

Church of St Mary the Virgin, Handsworth
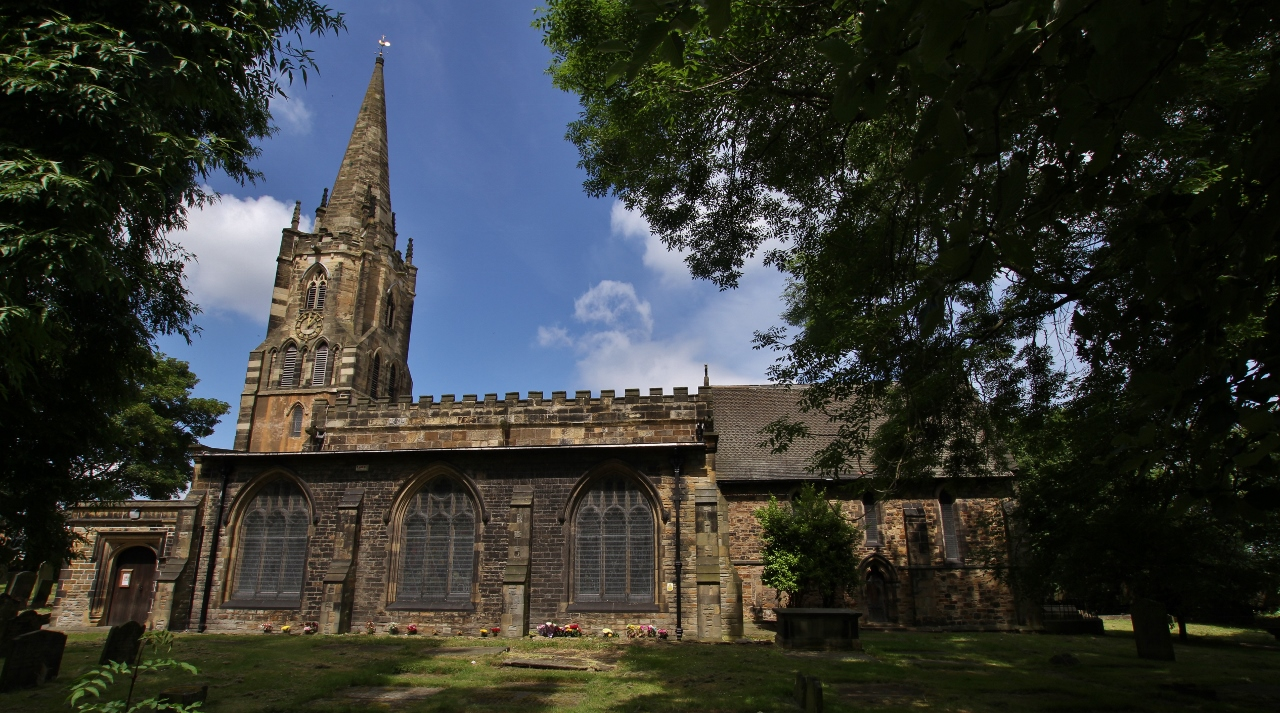
- The church from the south

- The Church of St Mary the Virgin in Sheffield
- OS grid reference: SK 41050 86204
- Location: Handsworth, South Yorkshire
- Country: England
- Denomination: Church of England
- Churchmanship: Anglo-Catholic
- Website: St Mary the Virgin S13 9BZ

History
- Status: church
- Dedication: St Mary the Virgin

Architecture
- Functional status: active
- Heritage designation: Grade II listed
- Designated: 28 June 1973
- Style: Gothic, Gothic Revival
- Years built: 12th to 19th centuries

Specifications
- Materials: stone

Administration
- Province: York
- Diocese: Sheffield
- Parish: St Mary the Virgin, Handsworth

St Mary's Church in Handsworth, South Yorkshire, is a Church of England parish church about 3 1/2 miles (5.6 km) east of the centre of Sheffield, England.

== History ==
St Mary's was originally a Norman church built in about 1170. It was founded by the Norman lord, William de Lovetot, or his father Richard, and the foundations were planned by William Paynel.

In the 1220s St Katherine's Chapel was added, probably for Maud de Lovetot, for prayer and Mass to be offered for the soul of her husband Gerard de Furnival, and perhaps their son, Thomas de Furnival who died on a crusade to Jerusalem and the Holy Land.

By 1472 the Fabric Rolls of York reported that the church was ruinous, but in the process of being rebuilt. It was successive Earls of Shrewsbury who had much of the damage repaired in the Tudor era.

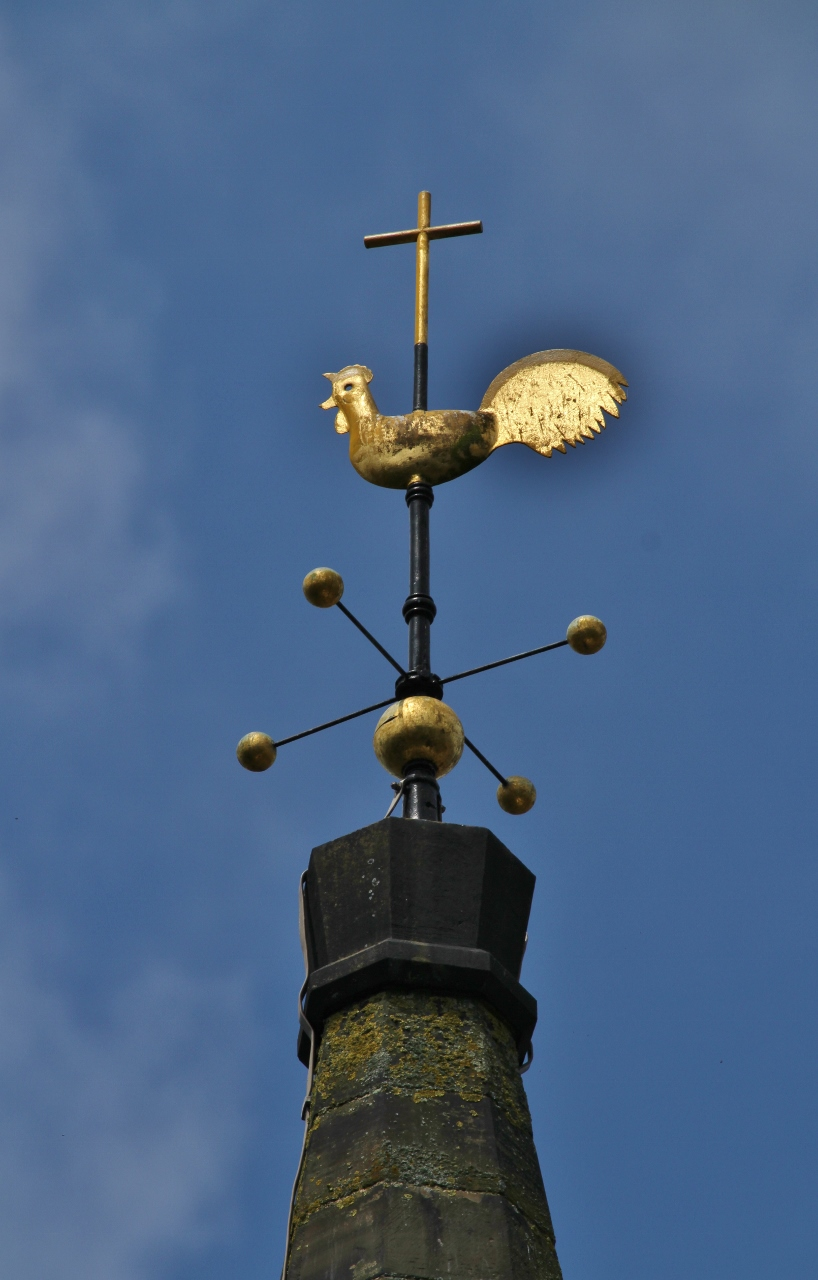
Weathercock on top of the spire

Lightning struck the church spire in 1698. The new steeple subsequently built to replace it was much smaller and became known as "the Handsworth stump". In the 1820s the "stump" was demolished and a new tower erected. Lightning struck the tower again in January 1978, this time causing less damage. The spire, and the clock and bell tower were extensively repaired in 2002.

Simon Foliot, the first Rector, had two assistants and by 1535 there were five. The assistants lost their livings in the English Reformation.

The west tower has a ring of eight bells. John Taylor & Co of Loughborough, Leicestershire re-cast and re-hung all eight bells in 1920. There is also a service bell, which was cast in 1590 by Henry II Oldfield of Nottingham.

The church is a Grade II listed building.

== Rectory ==
The Tudor rectory was where the Parish Centre is now. It was originally a timber-framed building. In the late 17th or early 18th century, a larger and more modern rectory was built near the chancel of the church. Shortly afterward a wing complementary to the east wing was built.

Little of the Tudor rectory survives, but parts were incorporated into the new building. A section of the straw and daub wall survives in the current museum, as does an oak tree post in the current reception hall.

All the pre-Georgian outhouses, except the coach house and stable block, were demolished. The coach house and stable block were modernised in the Victorian era.

== Chantry Inn ==
Immediately north of St Mary's church is the Chantry Inn. This was built in the mid-13th century as a church house for the chaplains and lay clerks attached to St Mary's. After the Reformation, the house was turned into a school. In about 1804 it became licensed as a public house.

== Registers ==
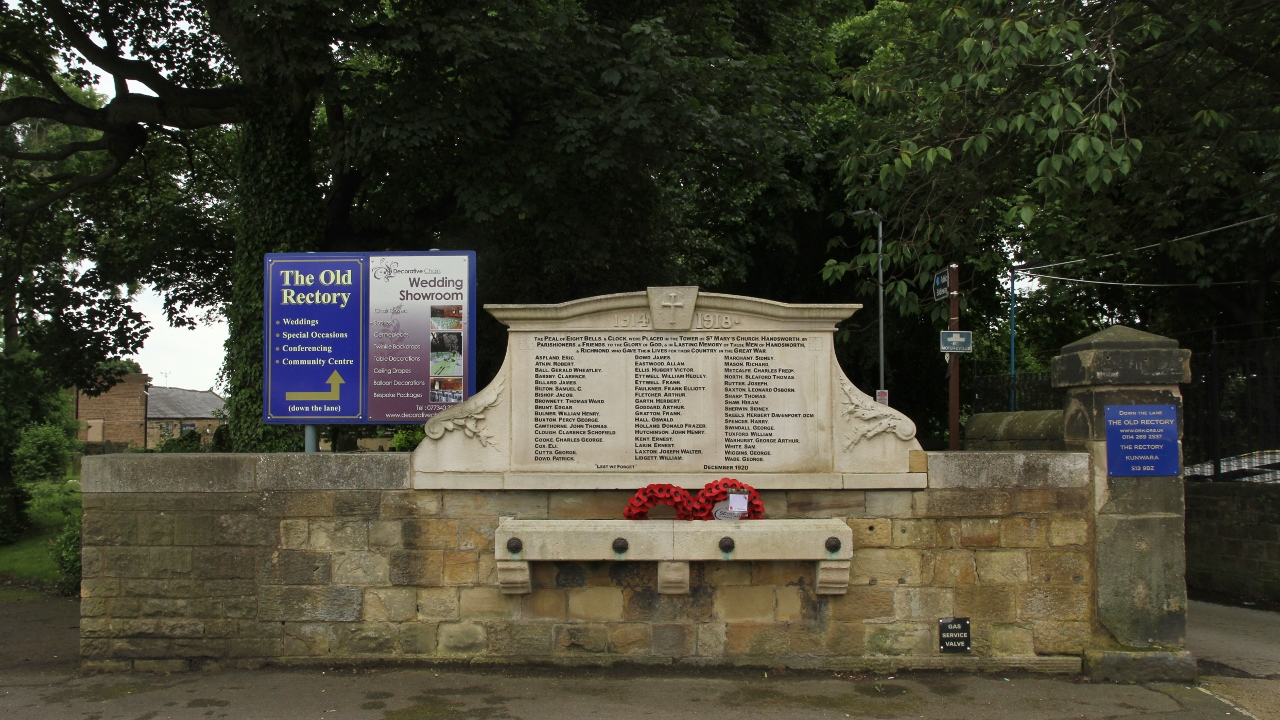
Handsworth war memorial, on the churchyard boundary facing Handsworth Road

Parish registers of baptisms, marriages and funerals at St Mary's survive from 1558 onwards. The registers are continuous until 1836, when a new system of registration was introduced.
