= Robertson Barracks, Swanton Morley =

Barracks in Norfolk, England, UK

Robertson Barracks
- Swanton Morley, Norfolk
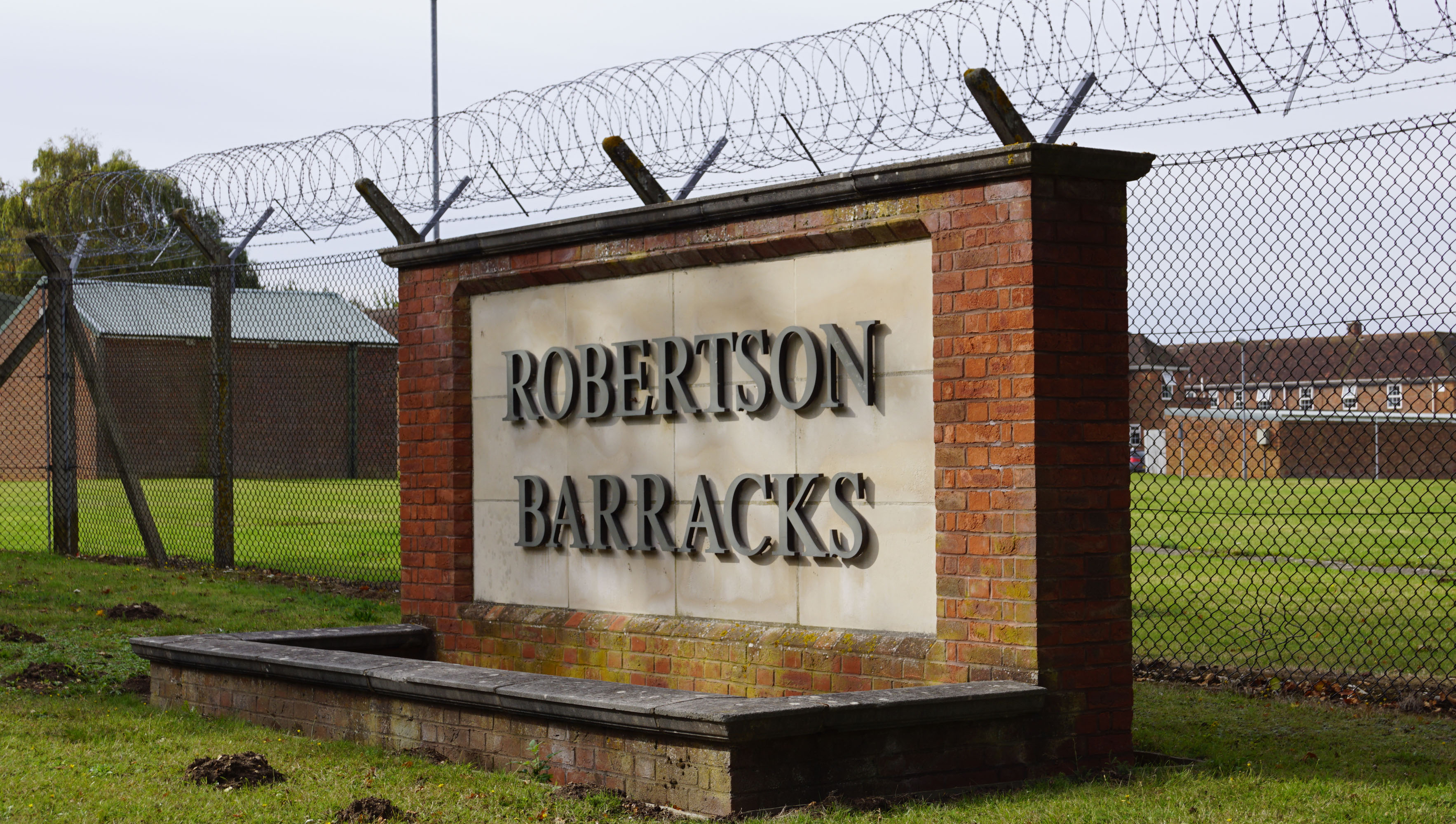
- Robertson Barracks

Site information
- Type: Barracks
- Owner: Ministry of Defence
- Operator: British Army

Location
- Location within Norfolk
- Coordinates: 52.72800°N 0.96700°E

Site history
- In use: 1995-Present

Garrison information
- Occupants: 1st The Queen's Dragoon Guards

Robertson Barracks, formerly RAF Swanton Morley, is a military installation near Swanton Morley in Norfolk. It is home to 1st The Queen's Dragoon Guards.

== History ==
=== RAF Swanton Morley ===
RAF Swanton Morley was a new station planned under the RAF expansion scheme but not completed before the start of the Second World War. It was part of 2 Group, RAF Bomber Command until December 1944 when it was handed over to 100 Group – the RAF unit responsible for countering German defences against the British strategic bombing – as they needed another airfield close to their HQ at Bylaugh Hall.

The base was operational between 1940 and 6 September 1995.

On 4 July 1942, American and British airmen took off from this station as part of the first combined bombing raid of World War II. 226 Squadron RAF had been tutoring the US 15th Bombardment Squadron. Both Winston Churchill and Dwight D. Eisenhower were at RAF Swanton Morley for this mission, which saw six crews from 15th Bombardment Squadron fly a raid with six crews from the RAF, using Boston light bombers belonging to 226 Squadron. The raid was made at low level against German airfields in the Netherlands. During the Second World War the station was home to the Bomber Support Development Unit (BSDU) of 100 Group.

After the Second World War the station was home to No. 1 Air Signallers' School, and the Radio Warfare Establishment RAF, which later moved to RAF Watton.

From June 1953 to 1995 the station was also used by 611 Volunteer Gliding School, when the station was listed for closure under Options for Change.

=== Robertson Barracks ===
The army barracks, named after Field Marshal Sir William Robertson, were established when RAF Swanton Morley was handed over to the British Army in 1995. In April 1998, it became the base of the 9th/12th Royal Lancers, who were replaced by the Light Dragoons in August 2000.

The Light Dragoons left the barracks on 6 June 2015 and were replaced by the 1st The Queen's Dragoon Guards who were returning from Germany.

The Army sometimes uses the Mid-Norfolk Railway to transport equipment, such as armoured vehicles used by 1st The Queen's Dragoon Guards, to their training facilities in other parts of the United Kingdom.

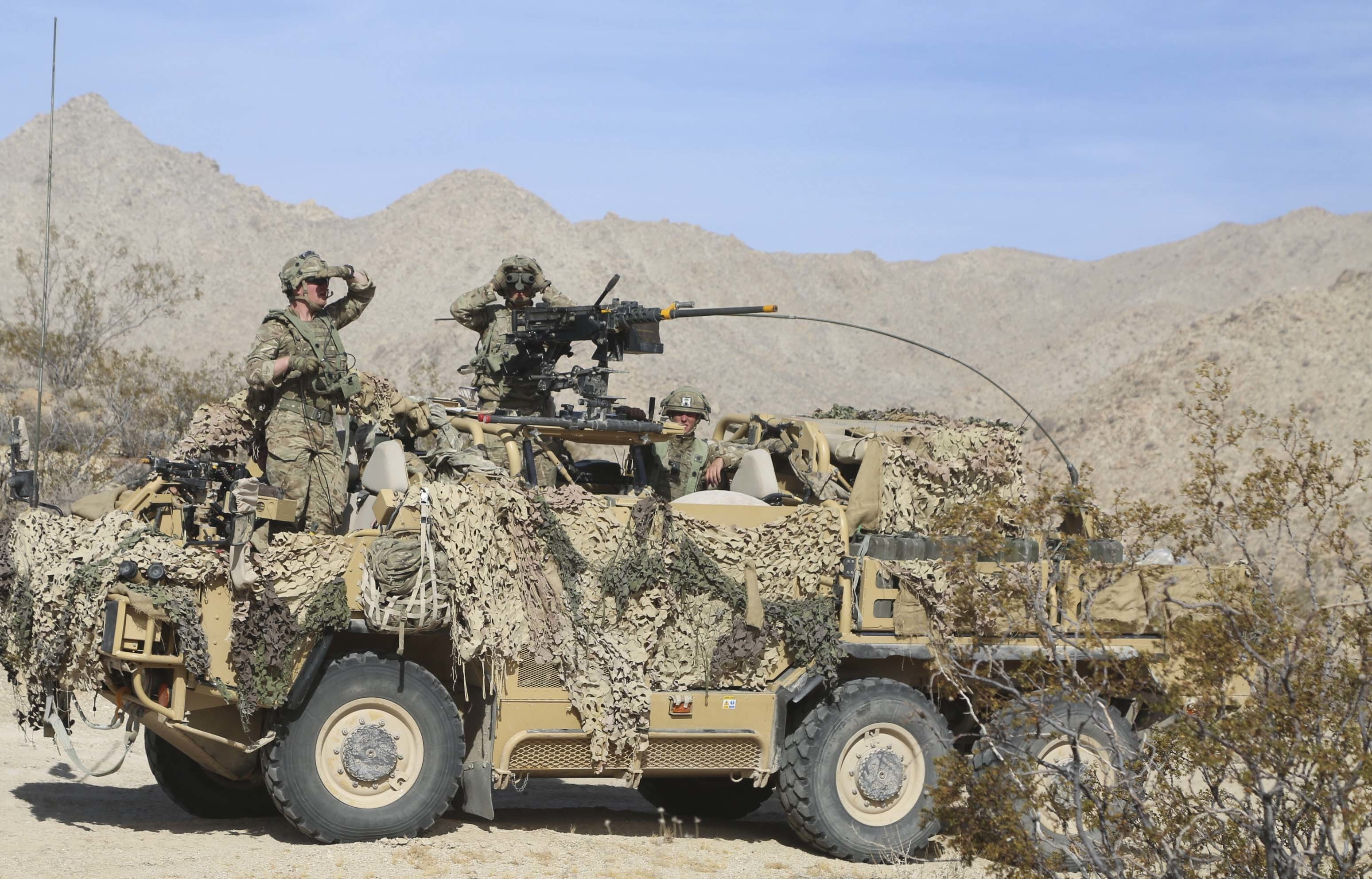
1st Queens Dragoon Guards

The 1st The Queen's Dragoon Guards are currently based at Robertson Barracks and are scheduled to be relocated to the new Caerwent Barracks on the base's closure.

== Units ==
- No. 3 Squadron RAF
- No. 88 (Hong Kong) Squadron RAF – Douglas Boston III, Boston IIIA (July 1941 – August 1943)
- No. 98 Squadron RAF
- No. 105 Squadron RAF – Blenheims, Mosquito (October 1940 – December 1941)
- No. 107 Squadron RAF
- No. 110 (Hyderabad) Squadron RAF
- No. 152 (Hyderabad) Squadron RAF – Supermarine Spitfire IIA (August – December 1941)
- No. 180 Squadron RAF
- No. 226 Squadron RAF – Blenheim, Boston, Mitchell (December 1941 – February 1944)
- No. 305 Polish Bomber Squadron
- No. 320 (Netherlands) Squadron RAF
- No. 464 Squadron RAAF
- No. 487 Squadron RNZAF
- No. 613 (City of Manchester) Squadron AAF
- 15th Bombardment Squadron (US Eighth Air Force)

Units:

- No. 1 Gliding Centre RAF
- No. 2 Group Communication Flight RAF
- No. 4 Radio School RAF became No. 1 Air Signallers School RAF became No. 1 Air Electronics School RAF
- No. 5 Air Experience Flight RAF
- No. 10 Air Navigation School RAF
- No. 15 Blind Approach Training Flight RAF became No. 1515 (Beam Approach Training) Flight RAF (October 1941 – November 1943)
- No. 17 Heavy Glider Maintenance Section RAF
- No. 100 Group Communication Flight RAF
- No. 102 Gliding School RAF became No. 611 Gliding School RAF became No. 611 Volunteer Gliding School RAF
- No. 206 Maintenance Unit RAF
- No. 228 Air Stores Park RAF
- No. 228 Maintenance Unit RAF
- No. 1482 (Bomber) Gunnery Flight RAF became No. 2 Group Support Unit RAF
- No. 1508 (Beam Approach Training) Flight RAF (September – October 1941)
- No. 1508 (Gee Training) Flight RAF
- No. 2715 Squadron RAF Regiment
- No. 2749 Squadron RAF Regiment
- No. 2770 Squadron RAF Regiment
- No. 2809 Squadron RAF Regiment
- No. 2836 Squadron RAF Regiment
- No. 4199 Anti-Aircraft Flight RAF Regiment
- No. 4214 Anti-Aircraft Flight RAF Regiment
- Pilot-Navigation Instructors Course RAF
- Radio Warfare Establishment RAF

== Future ==
In 2013, the British Government identified Robertson Barracks as one of seven "core bases" in which it would invest. However, in November 2016, the Ministry of Defence announced that the site would instead close in 2031.
