= Bagby =

Village and civil parish in North Yorkshire, England

Coordinates: 54.21°N 01.29°W

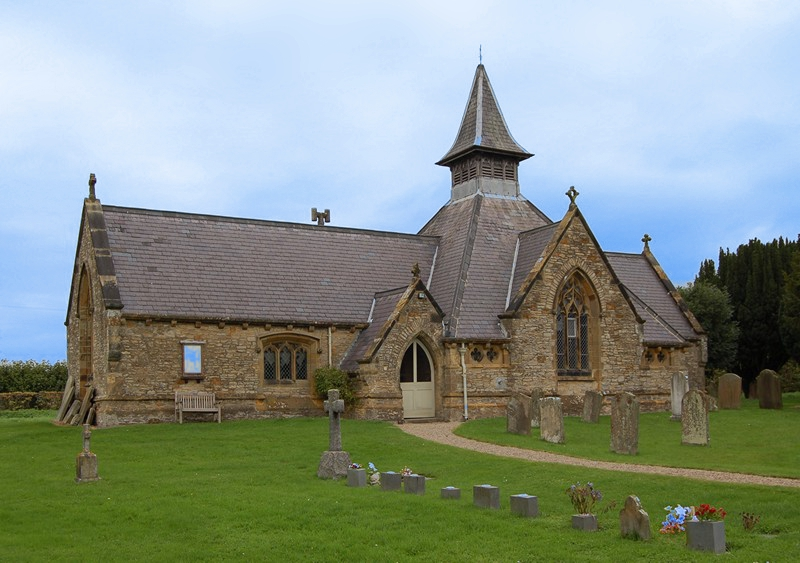
- St Mary's Church, Bagby

- Location within North Yorkshire
- Population: 593 (2011 census)
- OS grid reference: SE4680
- Civil parish: Bagby and Balk
- Unitary authority: North Yorkshire
- Ceremonial county: North Yorkshire
- Region: Yorkshire and the Humber
- Country: England
- Sovereign state: United Kingdom
- Post town: Thirsk
- Postcode district: YO7
- Police: North Yorkshire
- Fire: North Yorkshire
- Ambulance: Yorkshire

Bagby is a village and civil parish in the county of North Yorkshire, England, 3 miles (5 km) south-east of Thirsk. The parish had a population of 470 according to the 2001 census and a population of 593 at the 2011 Census. The parish shares a grouped parish council with the adjacent parish of Balk.

From 1974 to 2023 it was part of the Hambleton District, it is now administered by the unitary North Yorkshire Council.

The village is a mixture of old and new properties, farms, and some specialist furniture makers.

== History ==
The name Bagby comes from an Old Norse personal name Baggi + Old Norse býr, meaning "settlement" or "farmstead". Bagby is recorded in the Domesday Book as Bagebi/Baghebi. (The name is shared with the hamlet of Begbie, near Haddington, East Lothian, Scotland, and also Baggeby, Stockholm county, Sweden).

== Religion ==
St Mary's Church, Bagby is located in Church Lane. It is a Grade II Listed Building designed by Edward Buckton Lamb and built in 1862.

== Airfield ==
Bagby Airfield is situated on the southern edge of the village. The privately owned airfield is used by light aircraft and helicopters but has been the subject of various planning control issues relating to expansion, noise nuisance, and increased air traffic.

== See also ==
- Listed buildings in Bagby
