= Sheffield Outer Ring Road =

Road in Sheffield, England

Coordinates: 53.380°N 1.413°W

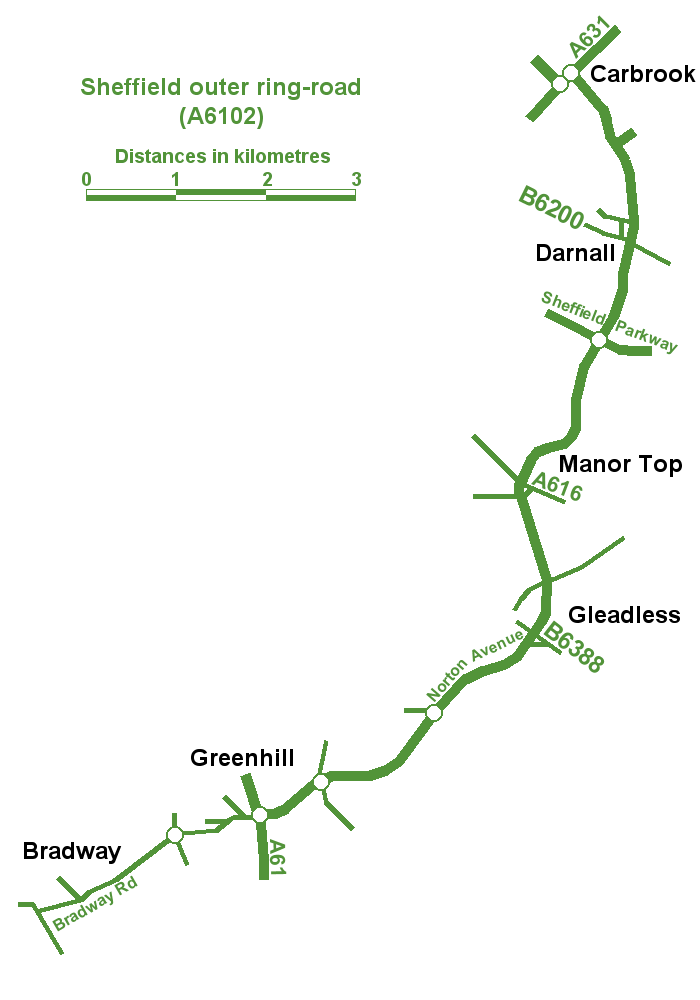
Route of the road

Sheffield Outer Ring Road is one of two main routes circumventing Sheffield, England, a partial ring around Sheffield City Centre and its suburbs.

== Route ==
It begins in Bradway as the B6054 Bradway Road, progressing anticlockwise as Greenhill Parkway, crossing the A61 Meadowhead/Chesterfield Road South into the A6102 Bochum Parkway, which turns north, passing through Norton. Heading east again, at Lightwood, it becomes the dual-carriageway A6102 Norton Avenue. After intersecting with White Lane at Gleadless Townend and passing Gleadless Townend Supertram stop, it becomes Ridgeway Road. It carries on northwards to intersect with City Road at Manor Top, where it becomes Prince of Wales Road, before traversing the Manor and Wybourn Estates, passing to the west of the Advanced Manufacturing Park and meeting the A57 Sheffield Parkway (which is grade separated). Still as Prince of Wales Road, it passes to the west of Sheffield Business Park, Tinsley Park Golf Course and the former Sheffield City Airport through the suburbs of Darnall and Attercliffe. It now heads north-west now named Greenland Road and passes over the River Don and to the North-east of Sheffield Arena and Don Valley Stadium. There are junctions here with the A631 Shepcote Lane and Attercliffe Common (where the ring road terminates as Broughton Lane) heading northeast to the M1 at Junction 34, Tinsley Viaduct.

Although some claim this to be the end of the ring road, a left turn, onto Attercliffe Common and a right turn after half a mile lead onto Janson Street and Hawke Street, which may also be considered part of the ring road. Heading west, this passes through the suburb of Grimesthorpe as Upwell Street, Owler Lane and Rushby Street, top form a junction with Barnsley Road and Firth Park Road by the large Northern General Hospital campus, where the ring road carries on as Herries Road to A61 Penistone Road in Hillsborough, where it fully terminates.

== Extension ==
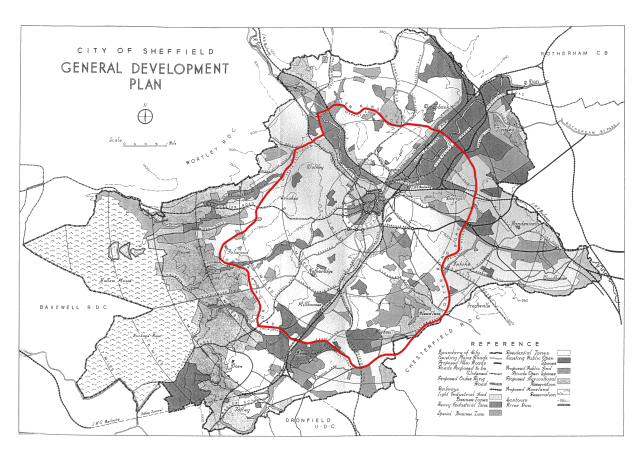
Proposed full Outer Ring Road route, Sheffield Replanned, 1948

Due to the topography of the region, there is no western section to the outer ring road, although it was originally planned to complete a full circuit. Some recent ideas to complete the western section have been mooted to relieve congestion in the south-west, possibly through Stannington, west of Fulwood and crossing Ringinglow Road, to intersect with Ecclesall Road South, where it would carry on as an upgraded Abbey Lane to Chesterfield Road.
