= 429 Transport Squadron =

- Active: 1942–1945; 1967–2005; 2007–current
- Country: Canada
- Branch: (Canada) Royal Canadian Air Force
- Current base: CFB Trenton
- Nickname(s): "Bisons"
- Motto(s): "FORTUNAE NIHIL" (Nothing to chance)
- Mascot(s): Bison
- Battle honours: English Channel and North Sea 1943-1945, Baltic 1943-1945, Fortress Europe 1943-1944, France and Germany 1944-1945, Biscay Ports 1943-1944, Ruhr 1943-1944, Berlin 1943-1944, German Ports 1943-1944, Normandy 1944, Rhine, Biscay 1943-1944, Afghanistan

Insignia
- Identification symbol: Argent on a mount Vert a Bison Gules hoofed and horned Or the head lowered

Aircraft flown
- Bomber: Vickers Wellington; Handley Page Halifax; Avro Lancaster
- Transport: Douglas CC-129 Dakota; De Havilland Canada CC-115 Buffalo; Lockheed CC-130 Hercules transport CC-177 Globemaster III

429 Transport Squadron of the Royal Canadian Air Force is one of four squadrons attached to CFB Trenton in Trenton, Ontario. The squadron was originally formed as a bomber squadron of the Royal Canadian Air Force (RCAF) attached to RAF Bomber Command during the Second World War.

== History ==
The squadron was formed on 7 November 1942 as the 429 (Bomber) Squadron RCAF with No 4 Group at RAF East Moor, but reassigned to No. 6 Group shortly after and disbanded on May 31, 1946. The squadron moved to RAF Leeming in 1943.

The current transport role was established at RCAF Station St Hubert on August 21, 1967, as 429 Tactical Transport Unit and in August 1981 renamed 429 Transport Squadron and moved to CFB Winnipeg. The final move was in 1990 to 8 Wing in Trenton, Ontario. 429 Squadron was disbanded in 2005.

Two years later in August 2007, 429 Squadron was again re-activated, this time operating the CC-177 Globemaster III strategic transport aircraft. It used these new aircraft in support of Canada's operations in Afghanistan.

Aircraft used by 429 Sqn include:

World War II

- Vickers Wellington - Medium bomber/ASW November 1942 to August 1943
- Handley Page Halifax - heavy bomber August 1943 to March 1945
- Avro Lancaster B.I and III - heavy bomber/ASW March 1945 to May 1946
- Douglas CC-129 Dakota Transport aircraft

Post War

- Douglas CC-129 Dakota Transport aircraft
- De Havilland Canada CC-115 Buffalo Transport aircraft
- Lockheed CC-130 Hercules transport aircraft
- Boeing CC-177 Globemaster III - strategic transport
