= No. 432 Squadron RCAF =

No. 432 (Leaside) Squadron RCAF 432 All Weather Fighter Squadron RCAF
- Active: 1943–1945; 1954–1961
- Country: Canada
- Branch: Royal Canadian Air Force
- Role: Strategic bombing (1943–1945); Fighter-interceptor (1954–1961)
- Part of: No. 6 Group RCAF (1943–1945)
- Nickname: Leaside
- Mottos: Saeviter ad Lucem ("Ferociously towards the light")
- Battle honours: English Channel & North Sea 1943; Fortress Europe 1944–1945; France and Germany 1944–1945; Biscay Ports 1944; Ruhr 1943–1945; Berlin 1943–1944; German Ports 1943–1945; Normandy 1944; Rhine, Biscay 1943

Insignia
- Squadron Code: QO (1943–1945)
- Squadron Badge: Argent in front of a full moon Argent a Cougar leaping downwards Sable armed and langued Gules.

Aircraft flown
- Bomber: Vickers Wellington Mk.X; Avro Lancaster Mk.II; Handley Page Halifax Mk.III & VII (1943–1945)
- Fighter: Avro Canada CF-100 Canuck (1954–1961)

No. 432 Squadron RCAF was a squadron of the Royal Canadian Air Force formed during the Second World War.

== History ==
It was first formed at RAF Skipton-on-Swale in May 1943, as part of No. 6 Group of RAF Bomber Command. The unit was equipped with Wellington Mk.X bombers.

The squadron deployed to RAF East Moor in mid-September, equipping with Lancaster Mk.IIs in October. In February 1944 they changed to Halifax Mk.IIIs, upgrading these to Halifax Mk.VIIs in July.

As part of a Royal Canadian Air Force public relations plan, the town of Leaside officially "adopted" No. 432 Squadron RCAF. Formed and adopted on 1 May 1943 the squadron took the town's name as its nickname, becoming 432 "Leaside" Squadron RCAF. The sponsorship lasted the duration of the war.

The squadron was disbanded at East Moor in May, 1945.

On October 1, 1954, it was reformed as a fighter squadron at CFB Bagotville flying the Canadian designed Avro CF-100. The squadron was again disbanded on October 15, 1961.

Manuel Sharko and Jack Stacy were mid-upper gunners in their respective Halifax bombers during the war.
