= Sheffield ring road =

Sheffield Ring Road may refer to

- Sheffield Inner Ring Road (also known as Sheffield Northern Relief Road)
- Sheffield Outer Ring Road
- M1, a north–south motorway in England connecting London to Leeds
