= Handsworth Road =

Road in Sheffield, England

Coordinates: 53.3774°N 1.3956°W

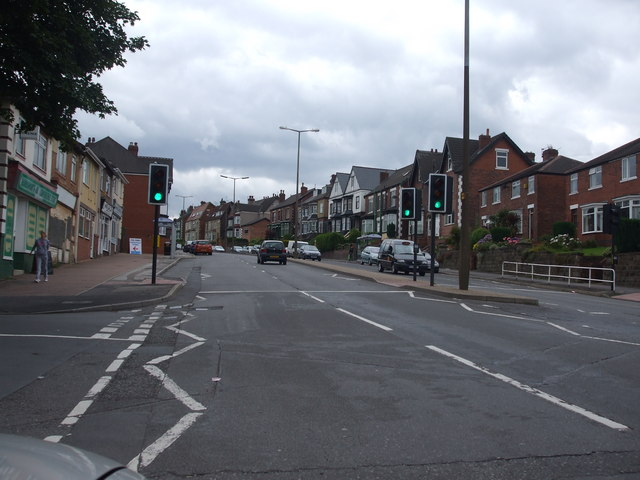
Handsworth Road

Handsworth Road is located in Sheffield, England.

Handsworth Road is a road located in Handsworth in the city of Sheffield. The road passes under the Sheffield Parkway before meeting up with Main Road in Darnall.

A number of listed buildings are located on the road including St. Mary's Church, the Cross Daggers Inn, Jeffcock Memorial Fountain and Trough and the Old Rectory.
