= List of Beam approach beacon system units =

This is a List of Beam Approach beacon system Units of the Royal Air Force.

The first system to guide RAF aircraft safely down onto a runway was called the Standard Blind Approach (SBA) system and was trialled in the late 1930s. It was also being used by a few civil airports. By late 1941 the word 'Blind' was changed to 'Beam' as it was felt that blind did not give a reassuring feel to a system used when visibility was very low. The word Standard came from Standard Radio, the name of the company that made the equipment under license from the German company that designed it. However the equipment was also 'standard' fit on RAF aircraft. The change from Blind to Beam is evidenced in the two sets of Unit names in the tables below.

There were no physical beams in the system at all, rather it relied on a heavily distorted dipole radiation pattern using a single transmitter. Instead of 'beams' it used a single heavily distorted toroid that was flipped left and right with a periodicity that simulated a morse code letter, the plane of equal field strength in this arrangement being mathematically equal to a line of zero width - a perfect 'beam' from an imperfect, cheaper, and simple radio transmitter. SBA was not automatic, the pilot flew the aircraft at all times.

The Beam Approach Beacon System (BABS) is an automatic radar landing system developed in the early 1940s but not used until much later when it replaced the SBA system.

== Blind Approach Training flights ==
Name	Formed	Location	Aircraft	Disbanded at	Disbanded	Unit became
1 Blind Approach Training Flight	12 January 1941	Abingdon	Armstrong Whitworth Whitley	Abingdon	8 November 1941	1501 (Beam Approach Training) Flight
2 Blind Approach Training Flight	February 1941	Linton-on-Ouse	Armstrong Whitworth Whitley	Driffield	8 November 1941	1502 (Beam Approach Training) Flight
3 Blind Approach Training Flight	27 January 1941	Mildenhall	Vickers Wellington	Mildenhall	8 November 1941	1503 (Beam Approach Training) Flight
4 Blind Approach Training Flight	17 December 1940	Wyton	Vickers Wellington	Wyton	8 November 1941	1504 (Beam Approach Training) Flight
5 Blind Approach Training Flight	1 January 1941	Honington	Vickers Wellington; Airspeed Oxford	Honington	8 November 1941	1505 (Beam Approach Training) Flight
6 Blind Approach Training Flight	6 January 1941	Waddington	Bristol Blenheim; Handley Page Hampden; Airspeed Oxford; Douglas Boston	Waddington	8 November 1941	1506 (Beam Approach Training) Flight
7 Blind Approach Training Flight	18 January 1941	Finningley	Bristol Blenheim; Handley Page Hampden; Airspeed Oxford	Finningley	8 November 1941	1507 (Beam Approach Training) Flight
8 Blind Approach Training Flight	January 1941	Wattisham	Bristol Blenheim	Horsham St Faith	8 November 1941	1508 (Beam Approach Training) Flight
9 Blind Approach Training Flight	January 1941	Thornaby	Vickers Wellington; Airspeed Oxford	Dyce	8 November 1941	1509 (Beam Approach Training) Flight
10 Blind Approach Training Flight	January 1941	Leuchars	Vickers Wellington; Airspeed Oxford	Leuchars	8 November 1941	1510 (Beam Approach Training) Flight
11 Blind Approach Training Flight	22 September 1941	Upwood	Airspeed Oxford	Upwood	October 1941	1511 (Beam Approach Training) Flight
12 Blind Approach Training Flight	22 September 1941	Dishforth	Airspeed Oxford	Dishforth	October 1941	1512 (Beam Approach Training) Flight
13 Blind Approach Training Flight	22 September 1941	Honington		Honington	October 1941	1513 (Beam Approach Training) Flight
14 Blind Approach Training Flight	22 September 1941	Coningsby		Coningsby	October 1941	1514 (Beam Approach Training) Flight
15 Blind Approach Training Flight	22 September 1941	Swanton Morley	Airspeed Oxford	Swanton Morley	October 1941	1515 (Beam Approach Training) Flight
16 Blind Approach Training Flight	22 September 1941	Topcliffe		Llanbedr	October 1941	1516 (Beam Approach Training) Flight
17 Blind Approach Training Flight	October 1941	Wattisham	Airspeed Oxford de Havilland Tiger Moth	Ipswich	October 1941	1517 (Beam Approach Training) Flight
20 Blind Approach Training Flight	10 October 1941	Breighton	Airspeed Oxford de Havilland Tiger Moth	RAF Holme	October 1941	1520 (Beam Approach Training) Flight
21 Blind Approach Training Flight	October 1941	Stradishall	Airspeed Oxford	Stradishall	October 1941	1521 (Beam Approach Training) Flight
22 Blind Approach Training Flight	October 1941	Docking	Airspeed Oxford	Docking	October 1941	1522 (Beam Approach Training) Flight
23 Blind Approach Training Flight	October 1941	Little Rissington		Little Rissington	October 1941	1523 (Beam Approach Training) Flight
24 Blind Approach Training Flight	October 1941	Bottesford	Airspeed Oxford	Bottesford	October 1941	1524 (Beam Approach Training) Flight
25 Blind Approach Training Flight	October 1941	Brize Norton		Brize Norton	October 1941	1525 (Beam Approach Training) Flight
26 Blind Approach Training Flight	3 October 1941	Andover	Airspeed Oxford	Thruxton	October 1941	1526 (Beam Approach Training) Flight

== Beam Approach Training flights ==
Name	Formed	Location	Aircraft	Disbanded at	Disbanded	Unit became
1501 (Beam Approach Training) Flight	8 November 1941	Abingdon		Stanton Harcourt	15 November 1943	Disbanded
1502 (Beam Approach Training) Flight	8 November 1941	Driffield		Leconfield	15 August 1943	Disbanded
1503 (Beam Approach Training) Flight	8 November 1941	Mildenhall		Lindholme	6 August 1943	Disbanded
1504 (Beam Approach Training) Flight	8 November 1941	Wyton		Newmarket	21 August 1943	Disbanded
1505 (Beam Approach Training) Flight	8 November 1941	Honington		Upper Heyford	3 February 1943	Disbanded
1506 (Beam Approach Training) Flight	8 November 1941	Waddington		Skellingthorpe	21 October 1943	Disbanded
1507 (Beam Approach Training) Flight	8 November 1941	Finnigley		Gransden Lodge	27 November 1943	Disbanded
1508 (Beam Approach Training) Flight	8 November 1941	Swanton Morley		Unk	1 March 1944	Became 1508 (Radio Aids Training) Flight
1509 (Beam Approach Training) Flight	8 November 1941	Thornaby		Dyce	14 August 1944	Absorbed
1510 (Beam Approach Training) Flight	8 November 1941	Leuchars		Unk	March 1943	Became 1510 (BABS) Flight
1511 (Beam Approach Training) Flight	October 1941	Upwood		Unk	15 September 1945	Became 1511 (Radio Aids Training) Flight
1512 (Beam Approach Training) Flight	October 1941	Dishforth		Banff	30 August 1944	Disbanded
1513 (Beam Approach Training) Flight	October 1941	Honington	Airspeed Oxford; Avro Anson	Bramcote	1 December 1946	Became 1513 (Radio Aids Training) Flight
1514 (Beam Approach Training) Flight	October 1941	Coningsby		Fiskerton	9 January 1945	Disbanded
1515 (Beam Approach Training) Flight	October 1941	Swanton Morley	Airspeed Oxford	Colby Grange	1 June 1945	Disbanded
1516 (Beam Approach Training) Flight	October 1941	Llanbedr		Unk	15 September 1945	Became 1516 (Radio Aids Training) Flight
1517 (Beam Approach Training) Flight	October 1941	Wattisham		Wheaton Aston	17 December 1945	Disbanded
1518 (Beam Approach Training) Flight	3 November 1941	Scampton		Edzell	30 August 1944	Disbanded
1519 (Beam Approach Training) Flight	November 1941	South Cerney		Feltwell	3 July 1945	Disbanded
1520 (Beam Approach Training) Flight	October 1941	Holme-on-Spalding-Moor		Sturgate	29 May 1945	Disbanded
1521 (Beam Approach Training) Flight	October 1941	Stradishall		Unk	15 September 1945	Became 1521 (Radio Aids Training) Flight
1522 (Beam Approach Training) Flight	October 1941	Docking		Watchfield	April 1942	Absorbed
1523 (Beam Approach Training) Flight	October 1941	Little Rissington		Little Rissington	17 December 1945	Disbanded
1524 (Beam Approach Training) Flight	October 1941	Bottesford		Tollerton	9 January 1945	Disbanded
1525 (Beam Approach Training) Flight	October 1941	Brize Norton		Docking	26 June 1945	Disbanded
1526 (Beam Approach Training) Flight	October 1941	Thruxton		Hampstead Norris	9 November 1944	Disbanded
1527 (Beam Approach Training) Flight	29 October 1941	Prestwick		Unk	15 September 1945	Became 1527 (Radio Aids Training) Flight
1528 (Beam Approach Training) Flight	22 November 1941	West Malling		Unk	15 September 1945	Became 1528 (Radio Aids Training) Flight
1529 (Beam Approach Training) Flight	22 November 1941	Wittering		Fairford	16 February 1946	Disbanded
1530 (Beam Approach Training) Flight	14 August 1942	Hunsdon		Wittering	1 August 1944	Disbanded
1531 (Beam Approach Training) Flight	20 July 1942	Cranage		Cranage	29 May 1945	Disbanded
1532 (Beam Approach Training) Flight	15 October 1942	Hullavington		Babdown Farm	15 June 1942	Disbanded
1533 (Beam Approach Training) Flight	27 October 1942	Church Lawford		Church Lawford	3 April 1945	Disbanded
1534 (Beam Approach Training) Flight	7 December 1942	Shawbury		Shawbury	29 May 1945	Disbanded
1535 (RCAF Beam Approach Training) Flight	15 December 1942	Middleton St George		Topcliffe	30 August 1943	Disbanded
1536 (Beam Approach Training) Flight	March 1943	Grantham	Airspeed Oxford	Spitalgate	8 May 1945	Disbanded
1537 (Beam Approach Training) Flight	4 May 1943	Upavon		Little Rissington	4 April 1947	Disbanded
1538 (Beam Approach Training) Flight	15 April 1943	Croughton		Croughton	18 October 1944	Disbanded
1539 (Beam Approach Training) Flight	15 April 1943	South Cerney		South Cerney	1 June 1945	Disbanded
1540 (Beam Approach Training) Flight	15 April 1943	Lulsgate Bottom		Weston Zoyland	17 December 1945	Disbanded
1541 (Beam Approach Training) Flight	17 May 1943	Stracathro		Stracathro	11 July 1945	Disbanded
1542 (Beam Approach Training) Flight	July 1943	Dallachy		Dallachy	30 August 1944	Disbanded
1544 (Beam Approach Training) Flight	24 January 1944	Errol		Errol	30 August 1944	Disbanded
1545 (Beam Approach Training) Flight	March 1945	Wheaton Aston		Halfpenny Green	17 December 1945	Disbanded
1546 (Beam Approach Training) Flight	8 May 1944	Faldingworth		Faldingworth	9 January 1945	Disbanded
1547 (Beam Approach Training) Flight	1 June 1945	Watchfield		Watchfield	1 January 1947	Disbanded
1551 (Beam Approach Calibration) Flight	20 November 1942	Bicester		Bicester	15 April 1943	Merged

== Radio Aids Training flights ==
Name	Formed	Location	Aircraft	Disbanded at	Disbanded	Unit became
1508 (Radio Aids Training) Flight	20 September 1945	Unk		Unk	20 November 1945	1508 (Acclimatisation) Flight
1510 (Radio Aids Training) Flight	9 August 1947	Unk		Bircham Newton	15 September 1948	Absorbed
1511 (Radio Aids Training) Flight	15 September 1945	Unk		Wheaton Aston	1 August 1946	Disbanded
1513 (Radio Aids Training) Flight	15 September 1945	Unk		Bramcote	1 December 1946	Disbanded
1516 (Radio Aids Training) Flight	15 September 1945	Unk		Snaith	11 April 1946	Disbanded
1521 (Radio Aids Training) Flight	15 September 1945	Unk		Longtown	1 April 1946	Disbanded
1527 (Radio Aids Training) Flight	15 September 1945	Unk		Prestwick	28 February 1946	Disbanded
1528 (Radio Aids Training) Flight	15 September 1945	Unk		Fairford	4 March 1946	1555 (Radio Aids Training) Flight
1552 (Radio Aids Training) Flight	15 September 1945	Melbourne		Full Sutton	26 October 1946	Disbanded
1553 (Radio Aids Training) Flight	15 September 1945	Melbourne		Melbourne	1 October 1945	Disbanded
1554 (Radio Aids Training) Flight	15 September 1945	Melbourne		Melbourne	1 October 1945	Disbanded
1555 (Radio Aids Training) Flight	15 September 1945	Fairford		Bircham Newton	31 August 1947	Disbanded
1556 (Radio Aids Training) Flight	15 September 1945	Stradishall		Fairford	1 April 1946	Disbanded
1559 (Radio Aids Training) Flight	1 October 1946	Oakington		Bircham Newton	9 August 1947	Disbanded

== Other units ==
Name	Formed	Location	Aircraft	Disbanded at	Disbanded	Unit became
No. 1508 (GEE Training) Flight RAF	1 March 1944	Unk	Unk	Ouston	8 August 1944	'C' Flight of No. 62 OTU
No. 1510 (BABS) Flight RAF	March 1943		Anson		9 August 1947	1510 (Radio Aids Training) Flight
Blind Approach Training and Development Unit RAF	22 September 1939	Boscombe Down	Anson, Whitley	Boscombe Down	14 October 1940	Wireless Intelligence Development Unit
Beam Approach Calibration Flight RAF	October 1941		Oxford, Anson	Bicester	20 November 1942	1551 (Beam Approach Calibration) Flight
Beam Approach Training Flight, Church Lawford RAF	March 1942	Church Lawford		Church Lawford	27 October 1942	1533 (Beam Approach Training) Flight
Beam Approach Training Flight, Nanyuki RAF		Nanyuki		Nanyuki	26 June 1942	Absorbed by No. 70 OTU
Blind Approach Calibration Flight RAF	12 July 1941	Watchfield	Oxford, Anson		October 1941	Beam Approach Calibration Flight
Beam Approach Development Unit RAF	4 October 1942	Watchfield	Anson, Oxford, Master	Hinton-in-the-Hedges	15 April 1943	'A' Flight, Signals Development Unit RAF
Blind Landing Experimental Unit	1 October 1945	Woodbridge	Anson	Martlesham Heath	1 November 1949	

== See also ==
Royal Air Force

- List of Royal Air Force aircraft squadrons
- List of Royal Air Force aircraft independent flights
- List of conversion units of the Royal Air Force
- List of Royal Air Force Glider units
- List of Royal Air Force Operational Training Units
- List of Royal Air Force schools
- List of Royal Air Force units & establishments
- List of RAF squadron codes
- List of RAF Regiment units
- List of Battle of Britain squadrons
- List of wings of the Royal Air Force
- Royal Air Force roundels

Army Air Corps

- List of Army Air Corps aircraft units

Fleet Air Arm

- List of Fleet Air Arm aircraft squadrons
- List of Fleet Air Arm groups
- List of aircraft units of the Royal Navy
- List of aircraft wings of the Royal Navy

Others

- List of Air Training Corps squadrons
- University Air Squadron
- Air Experience Flight
- Volunteer Gliding Squadron
- United Kingdom military aircraft serial numbers
- United Kingdom aircraft test serials
- British military aircraft designation systems
