= Navigator and Airman Aircrew School RAF =

Navigator and Airman Aircrew School RAF is a former Royal Air Force school which trained navigators between 1996 and 2005 along with other aircrew dating back to 1941.

- Navigator and Airman Aircrew School RAF (1996-2005)
  - Airfields used: RAF Cranwell
  - Aircraft used: Hawker Siddeley Dominie T.1
- Air Electronics, Engineer & Loadmaster School RAF (1983-96)
  - Airfields used: RAF Finningley
  - Aircraft used:
- Air Electronics and Engineers School RAF (1967-83)
  - Airfields used: RAF Topcliffe, RAF Finningley
  - Aircraft used: Vickers Varsity T.1 & Armstrong Whitworth Argosy C.1
- The Air Electronics School RAF (1960-67)
  - Airfields used: RAF Hullavington, RAF Topcliffe
  - Aircraft used: Avro Anson T.22 & Vickers Varsity
- No. 1 Air Electronics School RAF (1957-60)
  - Airfields used: RAF Swanton Morley, RAF Hullavington
  - Aircraft used: Avro Anson T.22
- No. 1 Air Signallers School RAF (1951-57)
  - Airfields used: RAF Swanton Morley
  - Aircraft used: Avro Anson T.21 & Percival Prentices
- No. 4 Radio School RAF (1943-51)
  - Airfields used: RAF Madley, RAF Swanton Morley
  - Aircraft used: de Havilland Dominie & Percival Proctor
- No. 4 Signals School RAF (1941-43)
  - Airfields used: RAF Madley
  - Aircraft used:

== See also ==
- No. 3 Flying Training School RAF
- List of Royal Air Force schools
