= Swanton Morley =

Village in Norfolk, England

Coordinates: 52.70864°N 0.98131°E

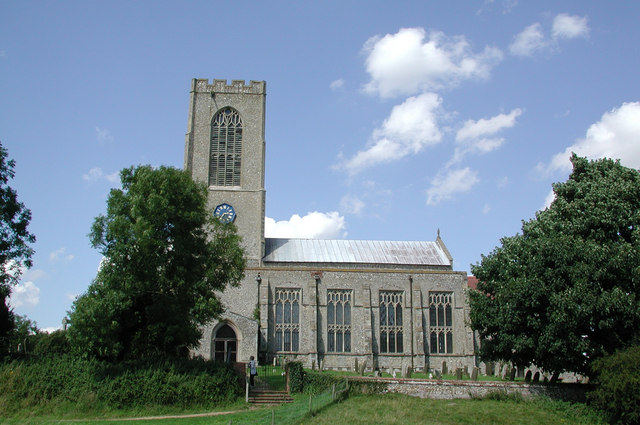
- All Saints, Swanton Morley's parish church

- Location within Norfolk
- Area: 11.14 km^{2} (4.30 sq mi)
- Population: 2,415 (2001 census); 2,100 (2011)
  - Density: 217/km^{2} (560/sq mi)
- OS grid reference: TG015165
- District: Breckland
- Shire county: Norfolk
- Region: East
- Country: England
- Sovereign state: United Kingdom
- Post town: DEREHAM
- Postcode district: NR20
- Dialling code: 01362
- Police: Norfolk
- Fire: Norfolk
- Ambulance: East of England
- UK Parliament: Mid Norfolk
- Website: swantonmorley.info

Swanton Morley is a village and civil parish situated in the English county of Norfolk. It is situated in the heart of Norfolk 18 miles from the centre of Norwich and three miles from Dereham, at the geographical centre of Norfolk. It covers an area of 11.14 km^{2} (4.30 sq mi) and had a population of 2,415 in 783 households at the 2001 census, reducing to a population of 2,100 in 723 households at the 2011 Census. For the purposes of local government it is in the Elmham and Mattishall Division of Norfolk County Council and the Lincoln Ward of Breckland District Council.

The village has a long history; it was documented in the 11th-century Domesday Book, and was home to the ancestors of Abraham Lincoln, 16th President of the United States. It has links to the armed forces through the nearby Robertson Barracks.

The village has won several awards including the Calor Village of the Year award 2009/10 for the East of England.

== Geography ==
Swanton Morley is located centrally between the market towns of Dereham, Swaffham and Fakenham, Dereham being the closest at three miles away. The village is adjacent to Bylaugh and Bylaugh Hall and is 18 miles (29 km) from the city and county town of Norwich.

== History ==
The first part of the village's name "Swanton" is derived from the Old English for herdsman's enclosure. The second part, "Morley", refers to Robert de Morli, who held the lordship of the manor in 1346. The village was the home of Richard Lincoln (1550–1620), a local churchwarden who built the building which is today The Angel public house. Lincoln was the wealthy grandfather of Samuel Lincoln, and Richard's coat-of-arms can be seen today in the east window of All Saints' Church in Swanton Morley. Richard Lincoln disinherited Samuel's father Edward from his will in favour of his fourth wife, thus throwing the Lincoln family into penury and forcing young Samuel to flee to Hingham, Massachusetts. His great-great-great-great-grandson was Abraham Lincoln, 16th President of the United States. Richard Lincoln is buried under the centre aisle of St Andrew's Church in Hingham, Norfolk, a privilege reserved for the gentry.

== Notable buildings and facilities ==
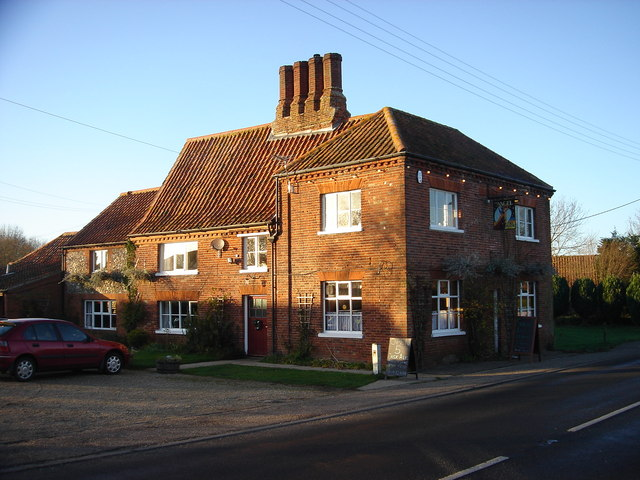
The Angel public house, originally home of Richard Lincoln, grandfather of Samuel Lincoln, American immigrant and ancestor of Abraham Lincoln

On the top of a hill to the north of the village lies All Saints' Church, a large 14th-century parish church built to an ambitious design in comparison to the size of the village. In particular the aisles of the nave extend to embrace the tower, which is supported on three sides by unusually large arches. All Saints is described by architectural critic Nikolaus Pevsner as "big and proud, and historically outstandingly interesting". In addition to worship, the bells are rung by the All Saints' Swanton Morley Bell Ringers. Also of historical interest is the Mill Bakery, which has been in business since 1645, and is one of a small number of Norfolk's organic bakeries. The Mill bakery has changed ownership and premises, and is currently owned by Budgens in Drayton, Norfolk and still continues production under the same name. The old premises including the historic mill were subsequently demolished.

The village has two public houses, The Angel and Darbys, both of which serve authentic real ale. The Angel pub is a timber-framed building which was the ancestral home of the Lincoln family, built in the 17th century by Richard Lincoln and later refaced with brick in the 19th century. The village hall, a relatively new building, is centrally located and used for community events within the village. It is regularly used by the Swanton Morley Entertainers, the Under 5's Group and the local Women's Institutes group as well as other village groups. Sports clubs include the Swanton Morley Cricket Club and the Swanton Morley Bowls Club. The village also has its own doctor's surgery, a nursing home and Swanton Morley Primary School, a voluntary controlled primary school for children aged 4 to 11. Other facilities include a butcher's, a delicatessen and a convenience store.

There are several areas to walk and enjoy the peace and tranquillity of the village, including two large areas of common land and several footpaths suitable for walks. There are also areas with opportunities for fishing on the nearby River Wensum. There was formerly a paper mill on the river which was burnt down in the 19th century. One of the former pubs in the village was called "The Papermakers". The village is home to Hunter's Hall, a large Victorian converted barn that hosts conferences and celebrations such as wedding receptions, along with bed and breakfast facilities on the Park Farm Estate on which the hall stands. In addition there are a number of holiday accommodation lets available within the village.

== Military links ==
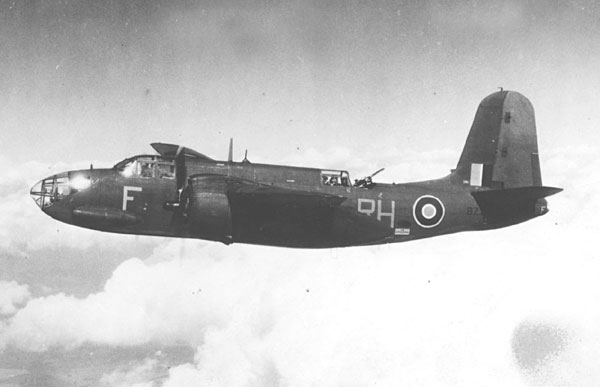
A Douglas Boston Mk. III of No. 88 Squadron, Royal Air Force, based out of RAF Swanton Morley from 1941 to 1943.

Since 1940 the village has been home to Robertson Barracks, formerly called RAF Swanton Morley. During the Second World War the first British and US combined bombing raid was launched from Swanton Morley on 29 June 1942, with Prime Minister Winston Churchill and Dwight D. Eisenhower present. In 1996 the base was moved from RAF to Army control, renamed to Robertson Barracks in honour of Field Marshal Sir William Robertson and became the home to the Light Dragoons, a cavalry regiment. In March 2013 it was announced that the Light Dragoons would be leaving in 2015 and they have been replaced by 1st The Queen's Dragoon Guards. The base is home to one of the best-preserved Art Deco air traffic control towers.

== Awards ==
The village was voted East of England village of the year in the Calor Village of the Year 2009/10 awards. The competition recognises villages that provide "a well-balanced, pro-active, caring community which has made the best of local opportunities to maintain and enhance the quality of life for all residents". The same year Swanton Morley won the EDP Norfolk Community of the Year award.

== Notable inhabitants ==
- Henry Ainsworth (1571–1622), Nonconformist clergyman and scholar
- Richard Lincoln (1550–1620), ancestor of Abraham Lincoln

== In fiction ==
Professor Swanton Morley, a character in Ian Sansom's comic thriller The Norfolk Mystery (2013) is named after the village.

== Gallery ==
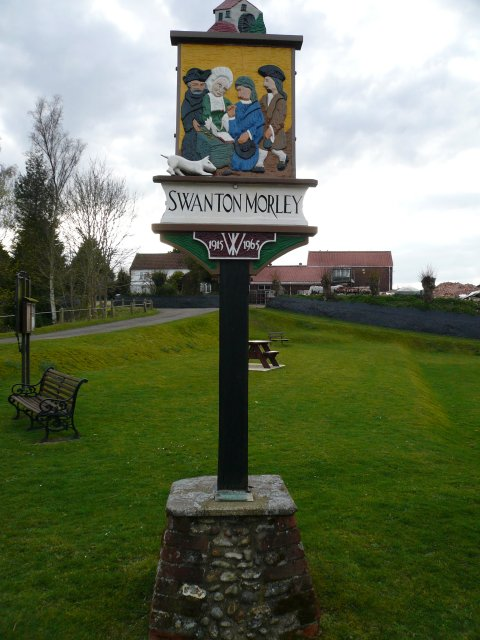
Swanton Morley's village sign

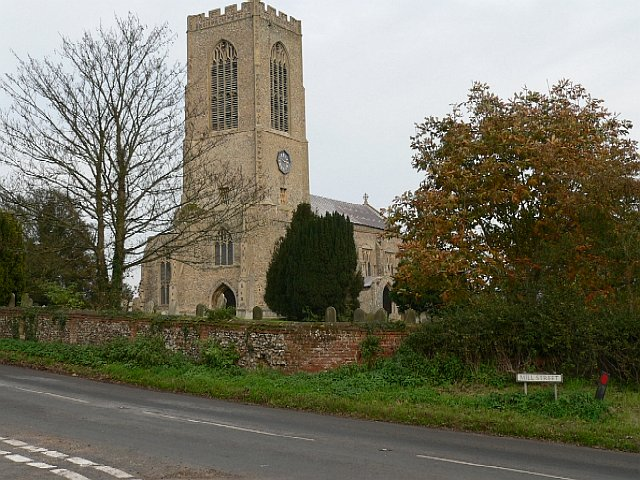
All Saints' Church from Mill Street

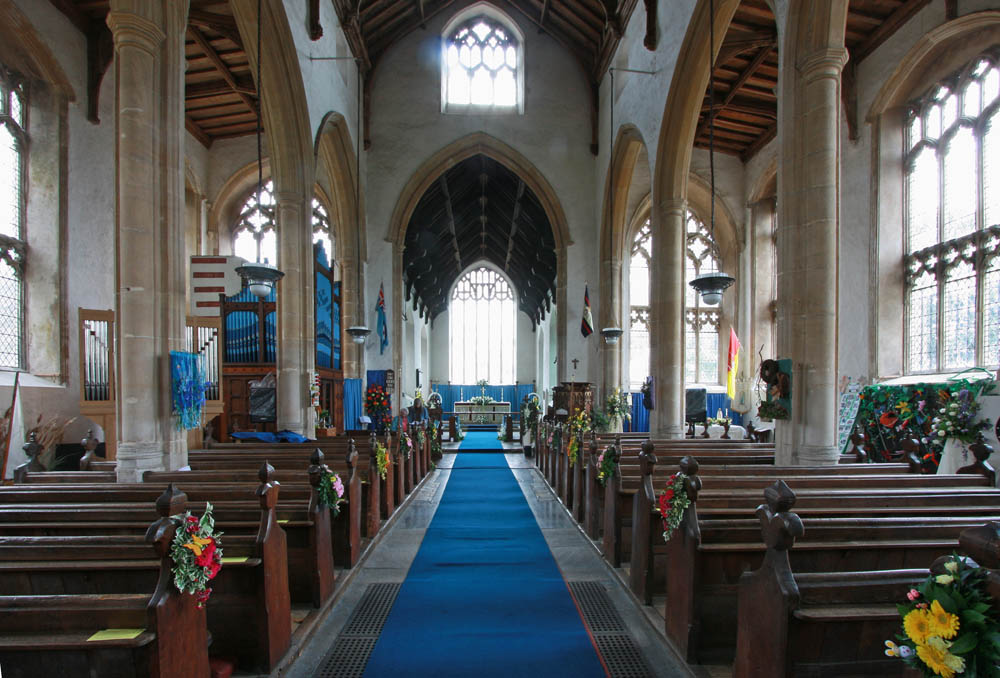
East end of the church from the nave

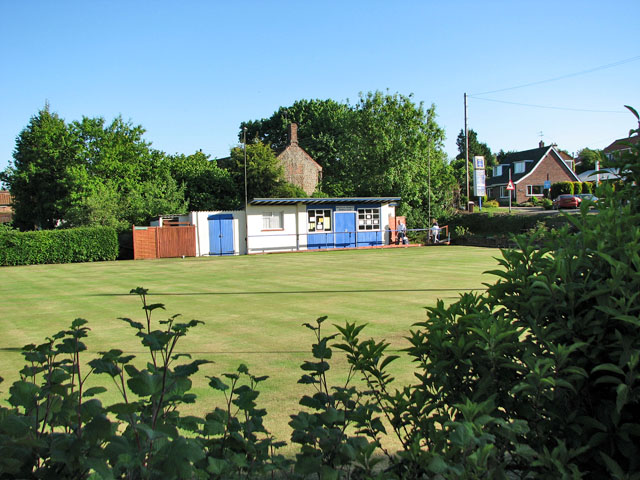
Swanton Morley bowls club

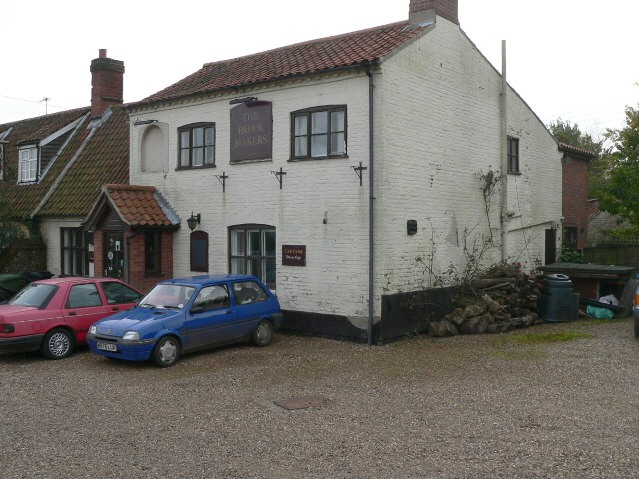
The Paper Makers

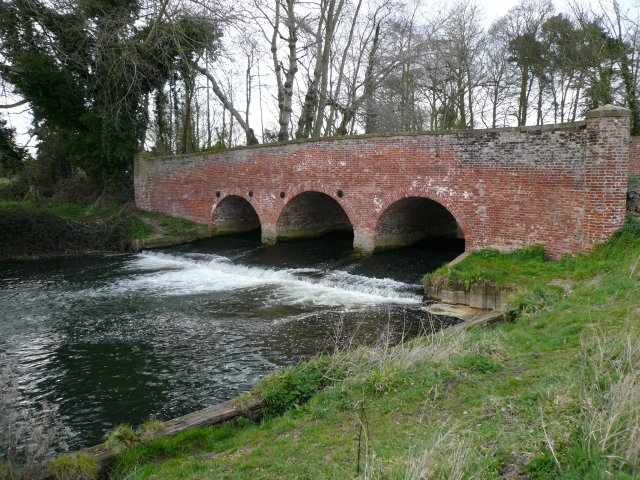
Bridge over the River Wensum outside the village

== See also ==
- Lincoln family tree

== Bibliography ==
- James Henry Lea; John Robert Hutchinson (1909). The Ancestry of Abraham Lincoln. Houghton Mifflin. p. 160.
- Nikolaus Pevsner; Bill Wilson (2002). The Buildings of England – Norfolk 2: North-West and South. Yale University Press. ISBN 0300096577.
- Stacy, J. (1829). John Chambers (ed.). A General History of the County of Norfolk: Intended to Convey All the Information of a Norfolk Tour, with the More Extended Details of Antiquarian, Statistical, Pictorial, Architectural, and Miscellaneous Information; Including Biographical Notices, Original and Selected, Volume 2. Norwich, England.
