= RAF East Moor =

Royal Air Force base in Yorkshire, England

RAF East Moor
- Sutton-on-the-Forest, North Yorkshire in England
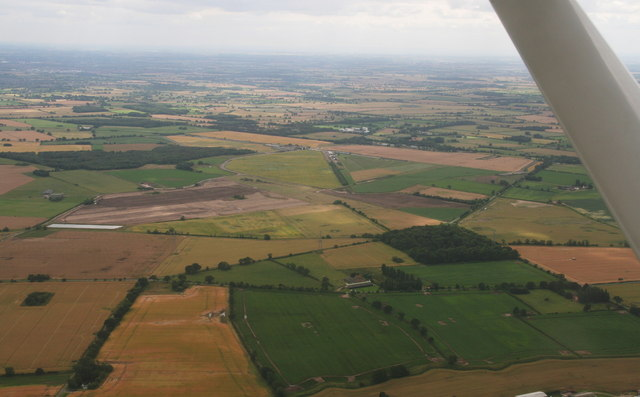
- Aerial view (2014)

Site information
- Type: Royal Air Force satellite station 1942–43 * 62 Base substation 1943–
- Code: EM
- Owner: Air Ministry
- Operator: Royal Air Force; Royal Canadian Air Force
- Controlled by: RAF Bomber Command * No. 4 Group RAF * No. 6 Group RCAF

Location
- Shown within North Yorkshire RAF East Moor (the United Kingdom)
- Coordinates: 54°04′08″N 001°05′06″W

Site history
- Built: 1941/42
- In use: June 1942 – June 1946
- Battles/wars: European theatre of World War II

Airfield information
- Elevation: 28 metres (92 ft) AMSL
Runways
Direction	Length and surface
02/20	1,310 metres (4,298 ft) Concrete
06/24	1,345 metres (4,413 ft) Concrete
16/34	1,735 metres (5,692 ft) Concrete

Royal Air Force East Moor or RAF East Moor is a former Royal Air Force satellite station located 7.4 miles (11.9 km) north of York, North Yorkshire and 5.5 miles (8.9 km) south-east of Easingwold, North Yorkshire, England.

The airfield was initially controlled by the Royal Air Force until the site was transferred to the Royal Canadian Air Force in 1942 before being handed back in November 1945.

== History ==
East Moor was opened in 1942 and was originally a 4 Group facility and first hosted No. 158 Squadron RAF which moved from RAF Driffield on 6 June 1942. The squadron flew the Handley Page Halifax Mk. II with detachments at RAF Beaulieu and RAF Manston before moving to RAF Rufforth on 6 November 1942.

=== Royal Canadian Air Force use ===
The first squadron was No. 429 Squadron RCAF which formed at the airfield on 7 November 1942 initially only flying the Vickers Wellington Mk.III until January 1943 when the Wellington Mk. X was added. The squadron left on 13 August 1943 going to RAF Leeming where the unit re-equipped with Halifaxes. On 19 September 1943 the next squadron arrived being 432 Squadron which initially used the Avro Lancaster Mk.II before being re-equipped with the Halifax Mk. III in February 1944 and the Mk. VII Halifax in July 1944. The squadron disbanded on 15 May 1945 at the airfield.

The last Canadian squadron to use the airfield was 415 Squadron which flew the Halifax III from 26 July 1944. The unit inherited the additional Mk.VII versions during March 1945 but disbanded shortly after on 15 May 1945 at the airfield.

=== Royal Air Force use ===
Not long after the last Canadian squadron disbanded the airfield was handed back to the Royal Air Force (RAF). The first RAF unit to use the airfield was No. 54 Operational Training Unit (OTU) which had moved in during November 1945 flying the de Havilland Mosquito. By May 1946 No. 288 Squadron RAF joined with their Supermarine Spitfire IX's and their Vultee Vengeance Mk. IV's with a detachment at RAF Acklington. The squadron disbanded on 15 June 1946. No. 54 OTU stayed until June 1946 when the unit moved to RAF Leeming but a detachment stayed until 15 November 1946.

== Units and aircraft ==
Unit	From	To	Aircraft	Version	Notes
No. 158 Squadron RAF	6 June 1942	6 November 1942	Handley Page Halifax	Mk.II	Moved to RAF Rufforth.
No. 288 Squadron RAF	24 May 1946	15 June 1946	Vultee Vengeance; Supermarine Spitfire	Mk.IV; Mks.VB and IX	Disbanded at the airfield.
No. 415 Squadron RCAF	26 July 1944	15 May 1945	Handley Page Halifax	Mks.III, VII	Disbanded at airfield.
No. 429 Squadron RCAF	7 November 1942	13 August 1943	Vickers Wellington	Mks.III, X	Formed at airfield.
No. 432 Squadron RCAF	19 September 1943	15 May 1945	Vickers Wellington; Avro Lancaster; Handley Page Halifax	Mk.X; Mk.II; Mks.III, VII	Disbanded at the airfield.
No. 54 OTU	1 November 1945	30 June 1946 (det. till 15 November 1946)	de Havilland Mosquito		
No. 158 Conversion Flight RAF	7 June 1942	25 September 1942	Handley Page Halifax	Mk.II	
No. 1666 Heavy Conversion Unit RAF	18 May 1943	13 December 1943	Avro Lancaster	Mk.II	
No. 12 Air Crew Holding Unit	15 June 1945	8 October 1945	N/A	N/A	

== Current use ==
The airfield closed to flying in November 1946. Most of the buildings were taken down and the land has reverted largely to agricultural use.
