= Bagby Airfield =

Airport in North Yorkshire, England

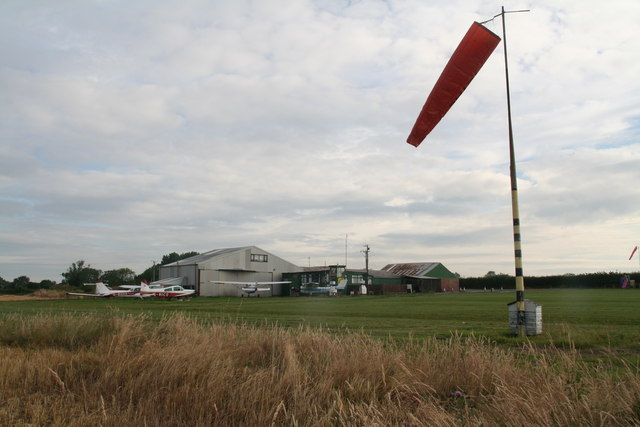
- Bagby Airfield
- IATA: None; ICAO: EGNG

Summary
- Airport type: Private
- Location: Bagby, North Yorkshire, England
- Opened: 1973
- Elevation AMSL: 131–197 ft / 40–60 m
- Coordinates: 54.2123°N 1.2917°W
- Website: Official website
- Interactive map of Bagby Airfield

Runways
Direction	Length		Surface
Direction	m	ft	Surface
06/24	690	2,264	Grass

Bagby Airfield is a small regional airport south of the village of Bagby, in North Yorkshire, England. The airport has been operating since 1973 and during the 2010s, it was criticised for its expansion plans and for the noise it generated around the local community. The airfield's owner has applied for improvements to the airfield and associated buildings.

== History ==
The airfield opened in 1973, being just to the south of the village of Bagby, and some 3 miles (4.8 km) south-east of Thirsk. The airfield estate covers an area of 15.6 hectares (39 acres) and has an undulating elevation of between 40–60 metres (130–200 ft) above sea level. The 690-metre (2,260 ft) long runway is orientated in a south-west to north-east direction, and ends by a hedge which separates the field from the A19; a take-off or landing which one guide describes as "..not for the faint-hearted pilot."

In 1980, it was limited to 40 take-offs and 40 landings every week. A report in June 2011 detailed that the site was experiencing between 73 and 125 air movements per week, beyond the limit of the 1980 ruling. However, the local government ombudsman pointed out that the imposed limit was specific to the previous owner's of the airport, and not the current owner. A 2014 public enquiry saw Hambleton District Council attempt to limit the airfield to 3,700 aircraft movements annually, but the government inspector stated it was allowed to have 7,228 movements without breaching planning laws.

The Yorkshire Air Ambulance (YAA) service operated at Bagby from early 2011 until early 2012, when they moved their operations to nearby RAF Topcliffe. Noise complaints prompted Hambleton District Council to serve YAA with a notice to dismantle their toilet block, showers and flight crew room at the site in late 2011.

In 2015, a pilot was arrested after a "haul of cocaine" worth £15 million was discovered at the airfield. In 2019, the owners of the airfield were granted permission to convert the engineering building into a clubhouse and control tower. The permission also allowed them to build a hangar, a fuel facility, a driveway and a tractor shed on the proviso that air movements were "capped".

The airfield has come in for complaints from local residents of the villages of Bagby and Thirkleby for noise and structural developments at the airfield. The former Hambleton District Council (Note: When the airfield opened in 1973, it would have been under the authority of North Riding Council. Between 1974 and 2023, it was under the authority of Hambleton District Council.) was criticised by an ombudsman who stated that the residents of the two villages had suffered an "injustice", and that the council had committed "an extreme and most serious failure of planning and administration". Due to the council's "maladministration" of its inquiries and dealings with the site, it was necessary to pay £5,000 to each village for community works. The owner of the site described the ten-year dispute as "outrageous", and declared that "the objections that are raised are purely that thy want to close the airfield by any means they can, but really it is appalling, we've had ten years of objections to a business that does no harm."

Objections were raised to the access-road to the airfield, which had been built close to a children's play park, and had also been laid down some 8 metres (26 ft) away from where the consented road had been agreed upon. The airfield's owner stated that this was a mistake by the contractors. After another investigation by the council triggered a fourth public enquiry, the airfield's owners said that the council were persecuting the site and wasting taxpayers money in doing so. The council had accused Bagby Airfield of widening its taxiways without permission, something that the airfield's manager stated was "..ludicrous; if you pull the grass up beside the new taxiway, you can see the old one." An application to improve the facilities at the site so as to increase the business potential of the airfield was submitted in February 2024. This was approved in December 2024, and will require the rebuilding of hangars and the start of what is hoped will be international flights.

In the 2010s, the airfield regularly had free entry events such as the Bagby Airfield Fly-in, where spectators could watch aerobatic displays or pay for quick rides in helicopters and aircraft. The main customers using the airport are "hobby pilots, high-profile jockeys, and utility repair firms."

== Accidents ==
- 22 September 2016, an aircraft veered off the runway in what was believed to be a sudden gust of wind. The De Havilland Gypsy Major accidentally crashed into a hangar when landing at Bagby although the pilot escaped injury. The pilot stated that as there was no air or ground radio service at Bagby, he checked weather details for a nearby airfield.
- 6 July 2023, a twin-engine aircraft based at Bagby, crashed near the airfield killing the pilot. Two months later, three men were arrested on charges of manslaughter in relation to the pilot's death.
