= Sheffield City Airport =

Defunct airport in Sheffield Parkway, 1997–2008

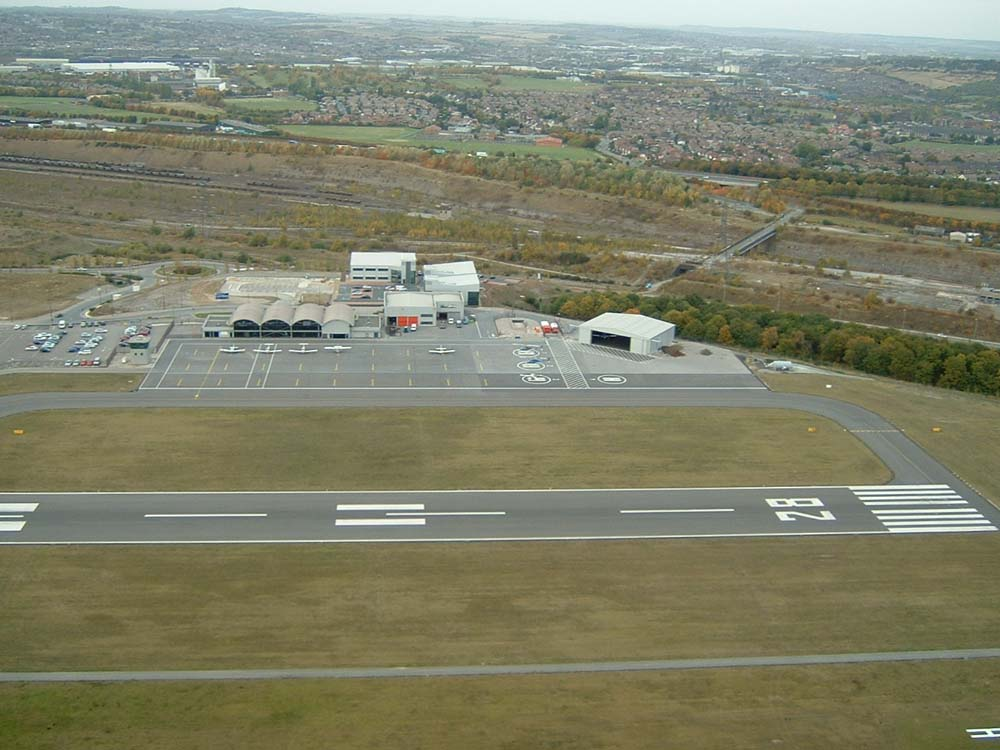
- IATA: ~~SZD~~; ICAO: ~~EGSY~~

Summary
- Airport type: Defunct
- Owner: Peel Airports and Heliports
- Operator: Sheffield City Heliport Services
- Serves: ~~Sheffield~~
- Location: Sheffield Parkway
- Opened: 1997
- Closed: 30 April 2008
- Elevation AMSL: 231 ft / 70 m
- Coordinates: 53°23′39″N 001°23′19″W

Map
- Location in Sheffield

Runways
Direction	Length		Surface
Direction	m	ft	Surface
10/28	1,211	3,972	Asphalt

Sheffield City Airport ~~(IATA: SZD, ICAO: EGSY)~~ was a small international airport in Sheffield that is now closed. The airport was located in the Tinsley Park area of the city, near the M1 motorway and Sheffield Parkway and opened in 1997. The airport's CAA licence was withdrawn on 21 April 2008 and it was officially closed on 30 April 2008. Today, the site is now part of the Advanced Manufacturing Park with various manufacturing businesses located inside of it.

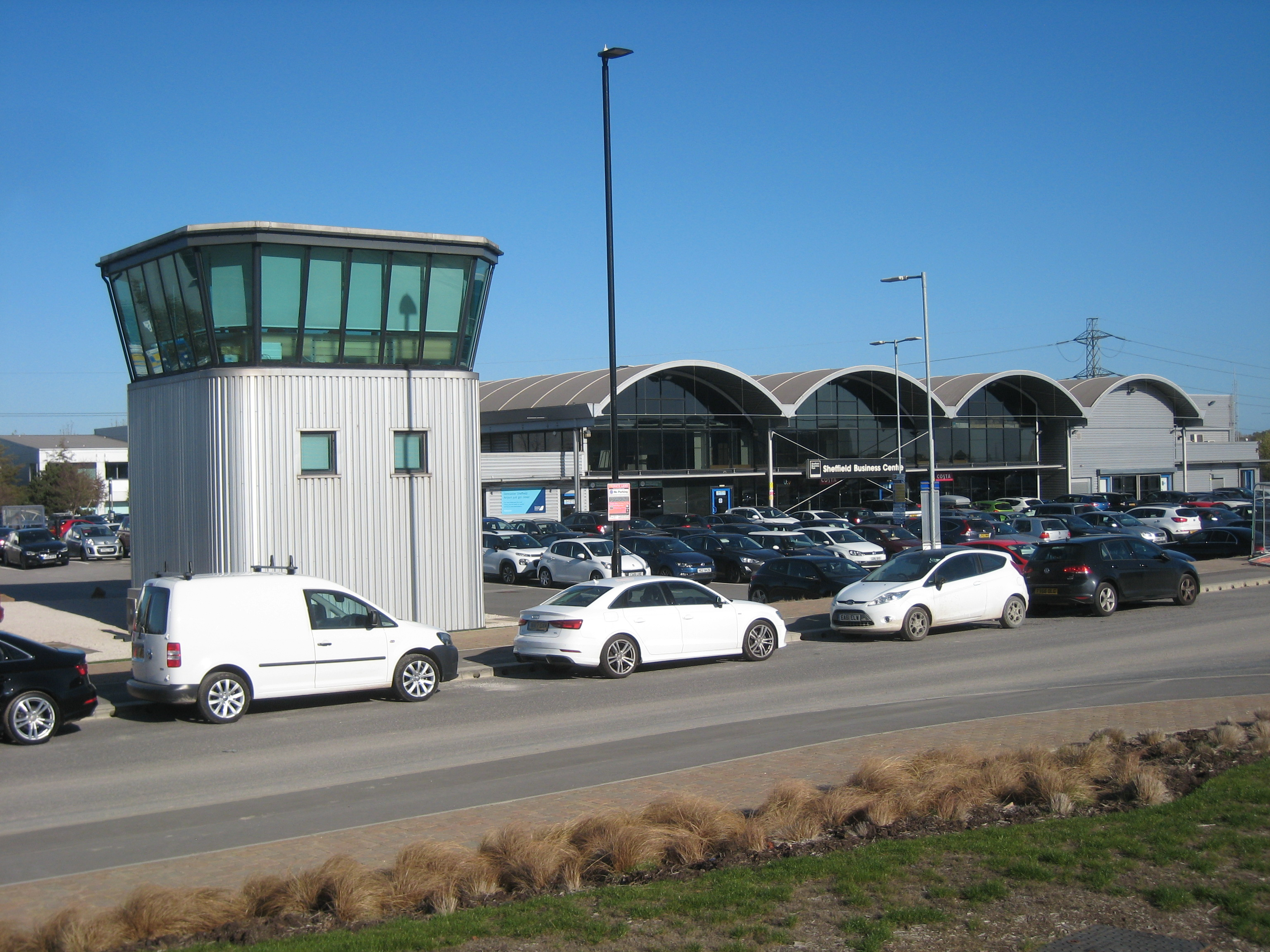
The former control tower, now within Sheffield Business Park

== History ==
=== Planning ===
Although an early proposal was made in 1968 to build an airport in South Yorkshire on land near Todwick in Rotherham, the scheme ultimately culminated to nothing. Nearly thirty years later, a consultant report suggested that Sheffield would benefit from a short-runway STOLPORT model similar to London City Airport. The main reason for the lack of an airport in Sheffield is due primarily to the fact there is only a limited area of flat land large enough for it. As such, the size of Sheffield City Airport was ultimately determined by this geographical factor. It is not coincidental that Sheffield is built on hills, as the resultant rivers powered the development of its most famous industries, which namely comprise steel making and engineering.

=== Operations ===
The airport opened in 1997 and scheduled flights began on 16 February 1998. The airlines KLM UK, Sabena, British Airways and Aer Arann all offered regular passenger services to Belfast, Amsterdam, Brussels, Dublin, Jersey and London from Sheffield City Airport. The Amsterdam service was noted by KLM UK as the best start-up they had ever experienced.

Passenger figures were:

- 46,000 in 1998
- 75,000 in 1999
- 60,000 in 2000
- 33,000 in 2001
- 13,000 in 2002

=== Demise ===
Sheffield City opened just as the low-cost airline revolution began in the UK, a change that rapidly made the high-fare short-hop business flights model obsolete. Likewise, the length of the runway limited the range of aircraft types that could use Sheffield. Most of the early low-cost airlines had planes that were unable to land at Sheffield. Nevertheless, Robin Hood Airport Doncaster Sheffield, which did have a larger runway, still struggled to attract such airlines.

By November 2001 the only remaining scheduled flights at the airport was the twice daily British Airways flight to Belfast City which later ceased in August 2002.

Peel Airports, who were shortly to be opening Robin Hood Airport Doncaster Sheffield airport purchased the site in 2002. By then, the airport terminal interior had already been converted to office accommodation. Fire and rescue cover and air traffic control were both reduced along with the withdrawal of published procedures for instrument approaches.

A base for the Yorkshire Air Ambulance opened at the airport on 25 October 2007.

=== Closure and redevelopment ===
Controversy surrounds whether Peel Airports had any incentive to promote the airport. The original lease between the Sheffield Development Corporation and Tinsley Park Ltd included a reversionary clause permitting the buyback of 80 acres (320,000 m^{2}) of land for £1 if it could be shown that after 10 years of opening, the airport was not financially viable. Peel's proposal to turn the airport into Sheffield Business Park advertised land at up to £220 per square foot, and as such, the estimated profit of the site reached heights of greater than £1,000,000.

On 22 November 2012, the South and East Yorkshire Branch of the Federation of Small Businesses launched a campaign and petition against the redevelopment of the airport site. They wanted the airport's potential to be reassessed. Three weeks later, a mystery bidder made a bid to Sheffield City Council to reopen the airport. However, nothing came of this and construction work began in 2014.

The heliport remained in operation after closure for use by the South Yorkshire Police air support unit and the Yorkshire Air Ambulance. The air ambulance base was closed in 2010 and moved to Bagby Airfield near Thirsk. The police helicopter base was closed by the National Police Air Service on 1 February 2016, bringing an end to aviation activity at the site.

The former terminal building and control tower have since been converted into office accommodation and the former Airport apron is now used as a car park.

The ICAO identifier EGSY was reassigned to MOD St Athan from 1 April 2019.

== Accidents and incidents ==
- On 4 February 2001, Short 360-100 registration EI-BPD, carrying 25 passengers and three crew, was damaged beyond repair following a hard landing at Sheffield City Airport after a scheduled Aer Arann Express passenger flight from Dublin. There were no injuries.
