= Sheffield Parkway =

Road in Sheffield, South Yorkshire, United Kingdom

Coordinates: 53.381°N 1.430°W

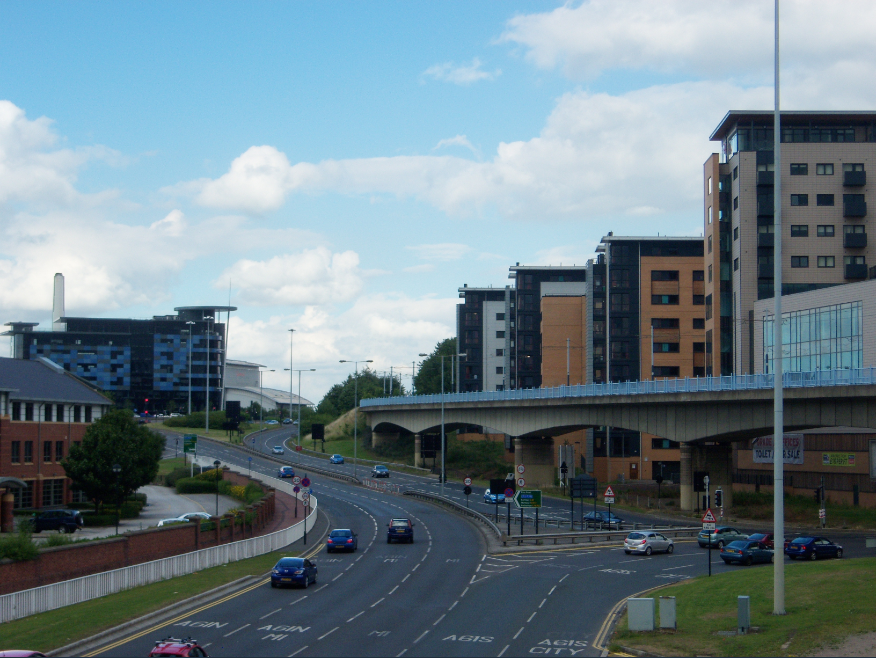
Sheffield Parkway as viewed from Park Square

Sheffield Parkway is a major dual carriageway which runs between the city of Sheffield and junction 33 of the M1 motorway in South Yorkshire, England. The 5.5-mile (8.9 km) road was opened in 1974.

== Route ==
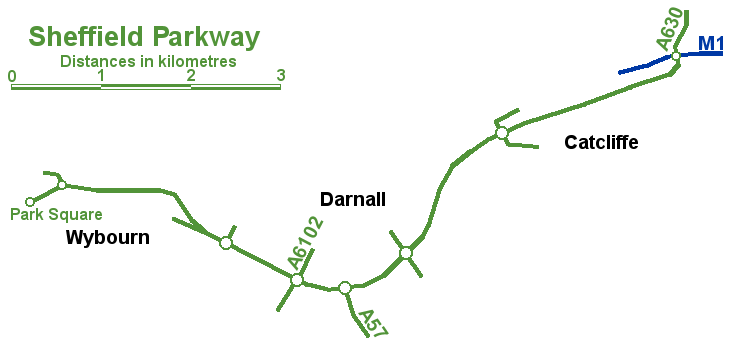
Plan of the Parkway

The route runs east of the City, connecting Park Square in the city centre with the inner ring road, outer ring road and the M1 motorway at junction 33. The Parkway first passes through the district of Wybourn, where slip roads provide access to Nunnery Square tram stop, which is the location of a large park and ride site on the South Yorkshire Supertram network. The route then passes the districts of the city council which are former villages: Darnall and Handsworth and the large village of Catcliffe, at which a slip road connects to Sheffield Business Park and the Advanced Manufacturing Park (AMP). At Handsworth the road passes through Bowden Housteads Woods, where it is possible to see the Parkway Man statue. Many businesses and Sheffield attractions are within sight of The Parkway, as it is known in South Yorkshire, and it can become highly congested. For approximately 2.5 miles (4.0 km) the road forms part of the A57; the rest is part of the A630. The South Yorkshire Fire and Rescue service Parkway Fire Station, which opened on 14 July 2015, has ease of access to the Parkway via Reynolds Road, at the junction of the A57 and A630.

A £46 million upgrade to create three lanes between Catcliffe junction and the M1 on both carriageways, and four lanes on the M1 slip roads, started in February 2021 with a completion date of autumn 2022. The upgrade included new barriers, traffic lights, resurfacing and a permanent speed restriction of 50 mph.

== Junctions ==
Parkway
Type	Destinations	Roads
Terminus roundabout	Rotherham	M1, A630
Grade separated roundabout	Catcliffe	B6533
Grade separated roundabout	Handsworth, Darnall	B6200
Grade separated diamond	Mosborough	A57, A6102 (westbound only)
Grade separated roundabout (no exit westbound)	Outer ring road	A6102
Trumpet	Parkway Industrial Estate	
West bound exit sliproad	Attercliffe, Manor	
At grade roundabout	Inner ring road	A61
Terminus roundabout	Sheffield City Centre	A61, A6135

== See also ==
- Parkway Man
