= List of Royal Canadian Air Force Bands =

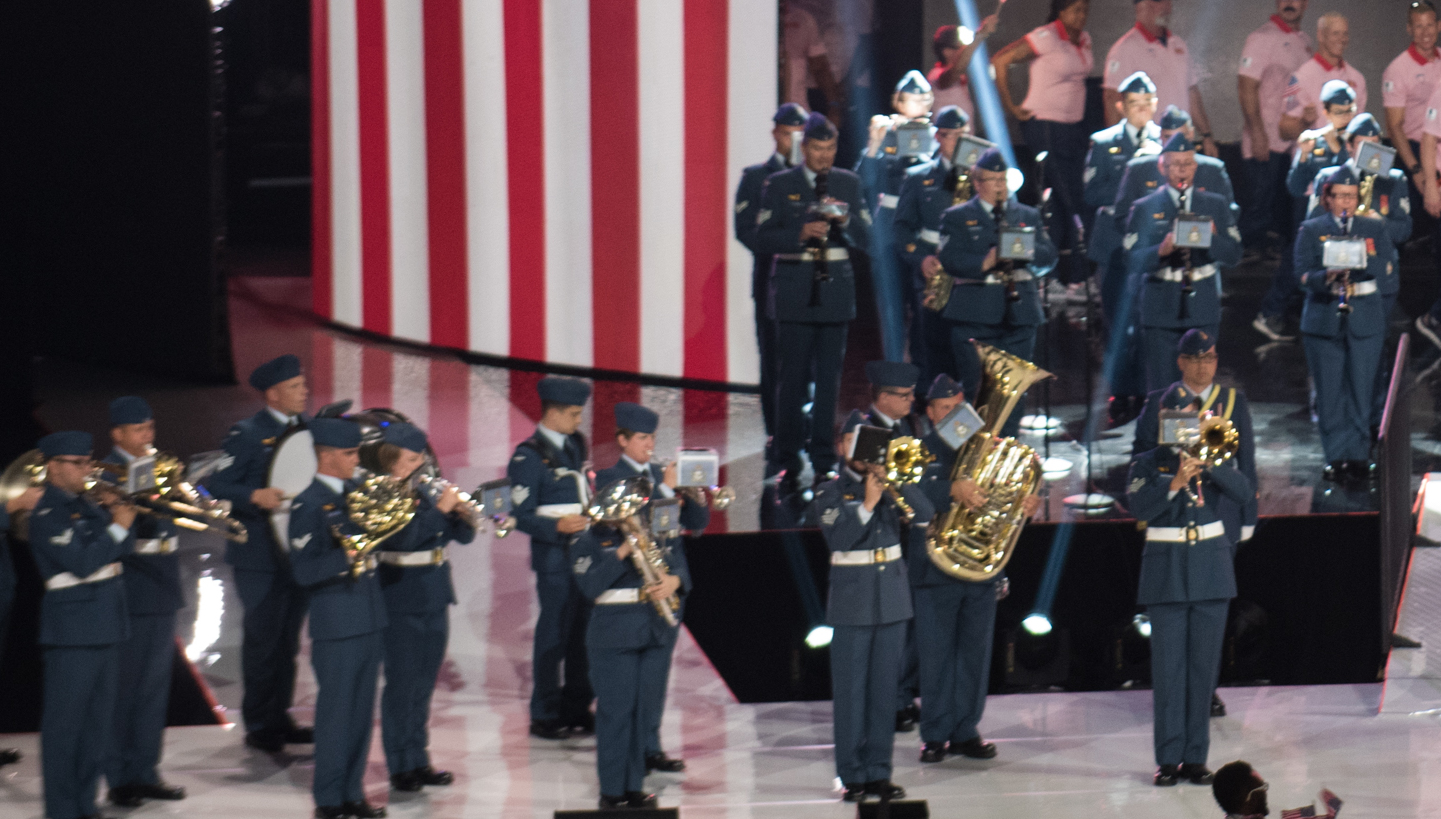
The CAF Central Band at Air Canada Centre for the opening ceremony of the 2017 Invictus Games.

The Royal Canadian Air Force maintained multiple military bands during its close to a century of existence. All Canadian military bands, including RCAF bands, provide entertainment and public affairs support to their units and communities. These bands provides musical support for air bases, military areas, and communities across the country.

== List of bands ==
=== Regular Force ===
==== Central Band of the Canadian Forces ====
The Central Band of the Canadian Armed Forces is the senior regular band in the Canadian Armed Forces. Attached to the Commandant of Canadian Forces Support Unit in Ottawa, it support institutions such as the Department of National Defence and the Government of Canada, as well as performs at events throughout the National Capital Region. Small numbers of musicians in the band belong to the Royal Canadian Navy and the Canadian Army, with the RCAF providing majority of the personnel, as well as its Director of Music and Drum Major.

==== RCAF Band ====
The Royal Canadian Air Force Band is a 34-member military band which represents the Royal Canadian Air Force in the Canadian Armed Forces. Currently located at Canadian Forces Base Winnipeg, the RCAF Band provides musical accompaniment for ceremonies of the RCAF in Canada. It is home to a wide range of ensembles including the Spitfire Kings rock band that was formerly part of the band.

=== Voluntary bands ===
The Royal Canadian Air Force has eight authorized voluntary bands, located at 4 Wing Cold Lake, 8 Wing Trenton, 12 Wing Shearwater, and 22 Wing North Bay. With the exception of the 22 Wing, they all consist of a voluntary brass-reed concert band and a voluntary pipe and drum band. By tradition, military/civilian volunteers parading as part of a band are authorized the band's optional items. No rank insignia are worn unless the individual holds that rank by right.

==== 4 Wing Brass and Reed Band ====
CFB Cold Lake sports a unit band that under the auspices of the 4 Wing. The band in its modern form was established in November 1982 after a resolution by the National Defence Headquarters in Ottawa. It performs public duties for the base as well as the city of Cold Lake and what was formerly Lakeland County. The following have served as bandmasters for the band: Jeff Gaye (1990–2009), Cam Martin (2014–2015), Jeremy Duggleby (2015-2020), Sylvain Beyries (2020-2024), Adam Gaw (2024–Present).

==== 8 Wing Brass and Reed Band ====
CFB Trenton is the headquarters of the oldest Air Force band in Canada; the Brass and Reed Band of 8 Wing. It was founded in 1939, when warrant officer, second class Tommy Cooper organized the first volunteer band at RCAF Station Trenton. Later that year a set of band instruments was purchased in order for it to perform during the royal tour of George VI and Queen Elizabeth. It originally consisted of enlisted tradesmen who served on a part-time basis. In recent years, the band has performed at a Battle of Britain military parade square at CFB Trenton to outreach engagements in the Netherlands, Germany and the United States. Its members also provide musical groups such as an 18-piece big band and jazz ensembles.

==== 8 Wing Pipes and Drums ====
The 8 Wing Pipes and Drums at CFB Trenton was officially formed in January 1963. The band has been in performances in the United States, Russia, Europe and Scotland. The band has a long history of success in competition, both in Canada and abroad. It won the Grade 4 North American Championships in both 2017 and 2018, as well as winning Ontario Grade 4 Champion Supreme in 2018.

==== 12 Wing Pipe and Drums Band ====
The 12 Wing Pipes and Drums is based in Shearwater, Nova Scotia, being founded in 1994.

==== 14 Wing Brass and Reed Band ====
Erle Dolsen was the first bandmaster of the 14 Wing Brass and Reed Band, serving from 1962 to 1972. The band has performed for events like the lawn party at the Lieutenant Governor of Nova Scotia. The history of the band is immortalized in a display at the Greenwood Military Aviation Museum.

==== 14 Wing Pipes and Drums Band ====
The 14 Wing Pipes and Drums Band is associated with Land Force Atlantic Area Training Centre Aldershot and 14 Wing Greenwood. It serves in the Annapolis Valley. It has been maintained since 1979.

==== 22 Wing Band ====
The 22 Wing Band is based at CFB North Bay in Ontario. It is a squadron-sized band that consists of 60–65 musicians who make up the parade and concert band, as well as a jazz and brass quartet.

==== RCAF Pipes and Drums ====
The Royal Canadian Air Force Pipes and Drums is the official pipe band of the RCAF. It is currently the longest continuous serving Air Force Pipe Band in the CAF. The 40 member pipe band participates in public duties such as National Remembrance Day parade in Ottawa. The Pipe Band wears a modified highland dress that is augmented with a kilt patterned in the RCAF Tartan.

=== Primary Reserve ===
==== 400 Tactical Helicopter Squadron Band ====
The 400 "City of Toronto" Tactical Helicopter and Training Squadron Pipe Band from CFB Kingston was established started in the 1930s. The band has won the North American Championship and the PPBSO Champion Supreme aggregate title in several grades in the past. The longest serving pipe major was Terry Cleland, who served for a total of 37 years.

==== 402 Squadron Pipes and Drums ====
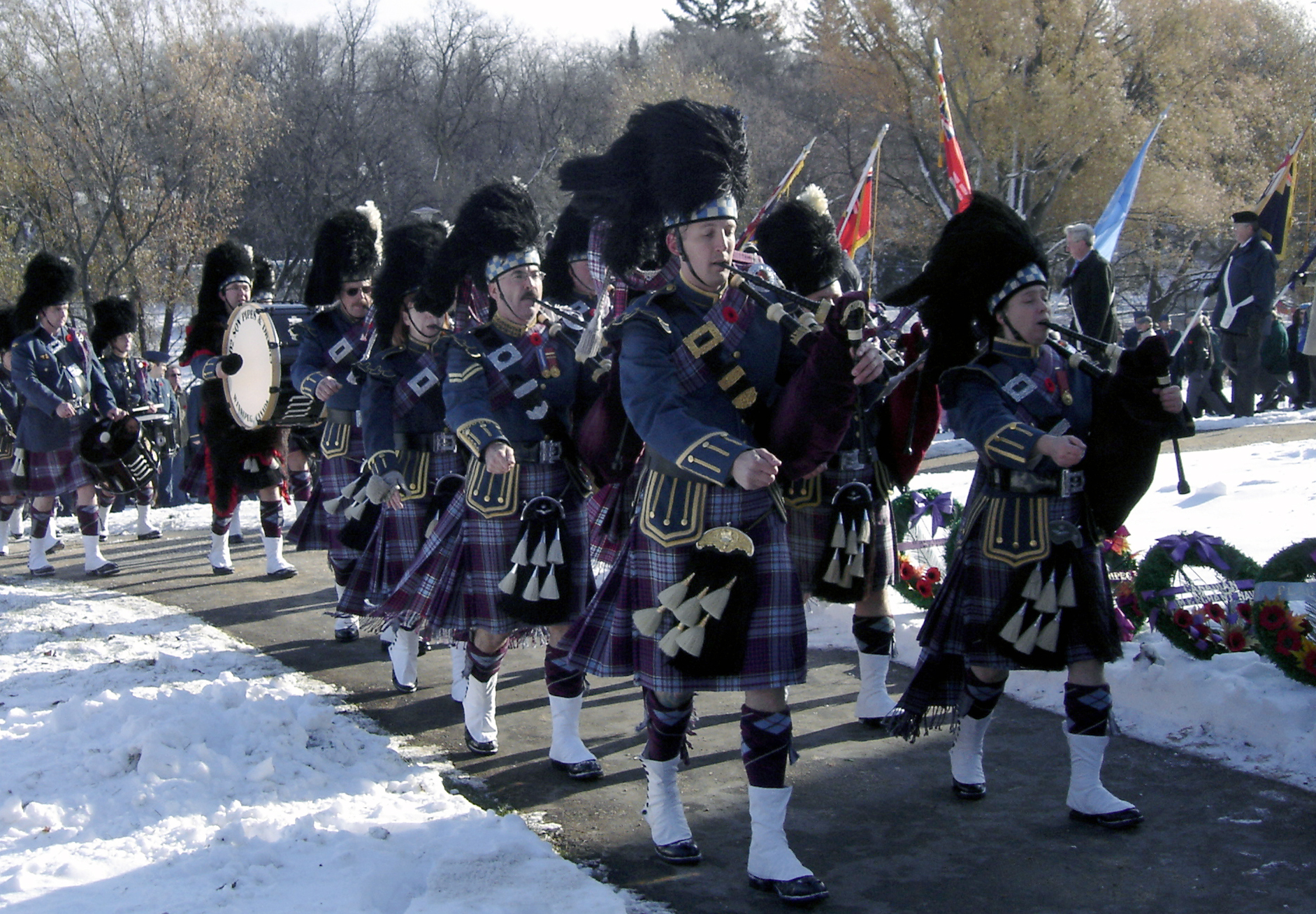
The pipe band at the Bruce Park Cenotaph

The 402 "City of Winnipeg" Squadron Pipes and Drums was originally formed in 1954 from the Winnipeg Thistle Pipes and Drums with Pipe Major, J. Reay becoming the first Pipe Major. The band has a composition of 22 members currently under the direction of Pipe Major Greg McTavish. It has traveled across the world to make appearances at events such as the Rose Bowl Parade in Pasadena, festivals in Denmark and Sweden, the Minneapolis Aquatennial and the 1967 Pan American Games. It bas also performed in Albuquerque, Dallas, Austin and San Antonio and Oklahoma City.

==== Musique du 438e Escadron Tactique d'hélicoptères ====
The Musique du 438^{e} Escadron tactique d'hélicoptères "Ville de Montréal" (Band of the 438 "City of Montreal" Tactical Helicopter Squadron) is based at the Hartland de Montarville Molson Hangar of CFB St. Hubert in Quebec. It has been performing for Quebecker and eastern Canadian audiences since its establishment in 1961. On its golden jubilee in 2011, it traveled to the Théâtre de la Ville for a holiday concert.

== Former bands ==
- RCAF Overseas Headquarters Band
- Women's Division Band of the RCAF
- No. 6 Bomber Group Band
- RCAF 419 Squadron Trumpet Band
- RCAF 119 Squadron Trumpet Band
- RCAF #1 Supply Depot Trumpet Band

== See also ==
- List of United States Air Force bands
- Royal Air Force Music Services
- Navy bands in Canada
