= CFB Uplands =

Canadian Forces Base Uplands
- IATA: none; ICAO: none

Summary
- Airport type: Military
- Owner: Government of Canada
- Operator: Department of National Defence
- Location: Ottawa, Ontario, Canada
- Built: 1940
- Occupants: Ottawa Macdonald–Cartier International Airport, Canada Reception Centre, The Central Band of the Canadian Armed Forces, Royal Canadian Air Force Pipes and Drums, 30th Field Artillery Regiment, Canadian Forces Crypto Support Unit, No. 412 VIP Transport Squadron, Self Help Housing Organization, Canadian Forces Housing Agency
- Coordinates: 45.327°N 75.676°W
- Website: Canadian Forces Base Uplands

Map
- Location within Ontario

Canadian Forces Base Uplands (also CFB Uplands) was a Canadian Forces Base located in Ottawa, Ontario. Most of the land which formed the base was transferred to the Ottawa Macdonald–Cartier International Airport after the base was closed in the 1990s. Several military units continue to exist at the former base and the Canadian Forces continues to maintain military housing at the site. The former base is now known formally as "Canadian Forces Support Group (Ottawa-Gatineau) - Uplands Site."

== History ==
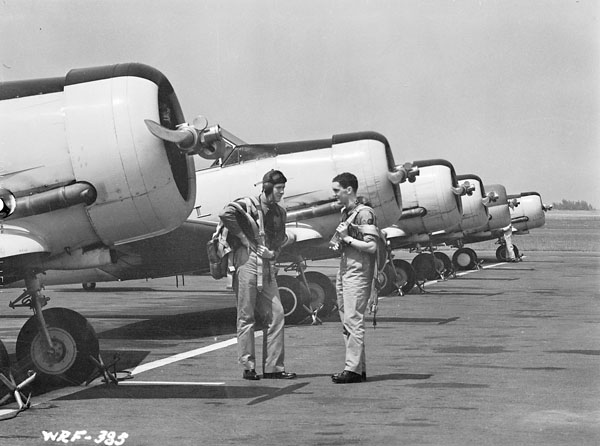
Instruction at No. 2 SFTS in July 1941

The Royal Canadian Air Force established RCAF Station Uplands as a wartime training station of the British Commonwealth Air Training Plan in 1940. The "No. 2 Service Flying Training School" (SFTS) was located at the base from 5 August 1940 to April 1947, which was one of two RCAF facilities in the national capital region; the other was RCAF Station Rockcliffe. When Sabre fighters became operational in 1952, Uplands became the primary Ottawa air base since Sabres could not operate from the small Rockcliffe runways.

During the Cold War period of the 1950s, the station was home to several operational squadrons including 416 Squadron, 439 Squadron, 422 Squadron, 428 Squadron, 434 Squadron, 412 (Transport) Squadron, 436 (Transport) Squadron and 410 Squadron.

RCAF Station Uplands was also the location for the No. 3 Air Movement Unit, as well as the Central Experimental and Proving Establishment (later renamed the Aerospace Engineering Test Establishment), which moved to Uplands from Rockcliffe in 1957.

The reorganization and unification of the Canadian Armed Forces in the late 1960s saw RCAF Station Uplands renamed Canadian Forces Base Uplands (CFB Uplands) in 1968. In 1972 the facility was redesignated as Canadian Forces Base Ottawa (South) or CFB Ottawa (South) as part of DND's amalgamation of Ottawa area defence properties into CFB Ottawa. Despite this change, the Uplands name remained in popular usage through to the base's eventual decommissioning.

During the 1970s, the base hosted 450 (Heavy Transport) Squadron (later redesignated 450 Transport Helicopter Squadron) and 426 (Transport Training) Squadron. 450 was one of two squadrons using CH-47 Chinooks. Other units included the Canadian Forces Support Unit Ottawa, and the Canadian Forces Airborne Sensing Unit, a detachment of 414 Electronic Warfare Squadron based at CFB North Bay.

The introduction of the "wing concept" within Air Command in 1993 resulted in CFB Ottawa (South) hosting 7 Wing as its primary lodger unit. Following the end of the Cold War, the Canadian Forces underwent major budget cuts and reorganization.

In 2007, The Polish Embassy rededicated a plaque to Canada's Air Force for providing humanitarian aid to Poland at the end of World War II. A ceremony was held at the Our Lady of the Airways Chapel at the entrance of Canadian Forces Base (CFB) Uplands. The plaque had been placed at CFB Rockcliffe from 1947 until 1994 at which time the base was shut down.

== Current status ==
The Uplands facility was decommissioned as a base in 1996. However the buildings and tarmac remain the property of the Canadian Forces. The Canada Reception Centre is located on the former CFB Uplands.

The area continues to be informally referred to as a "base" or "Canadian Forces Base Uplands" by some military personnel. Its official title is "Canadian Forces Support Unit (Ottawa) - Uplands Site."

=== Governance ===
As of May 2013 the former base is administered by the Canadian Forces Support Unit (Ottawa). Similar to military bases still in operation, the commanding officer of CFSU (Ottawa) has duties similar to the base commander of a base and the chief warrant officer of CFSU (Ottawa) has duties similar to a base chief warrant officer.

=== Units operating out of Uplands ===
A number of units parade or operate out of the former base's existing infrastructure, and some new buildings have been constructed to accommodate military units operating in Ottawa. These units include:

- The Central Band of the Canadian Armed Forces
- The Royal Canadian Air Force Pipes and Drums
- Canadian Forces Crypto Support Unit
- 412 Transport Squadron
- 30th Field Artillery Regiment

742 National Capital Royal Canadian Air Cadet Squadron also operates out of the Canada Reception Centre situated at the site of the formal base.

=== Photos ===
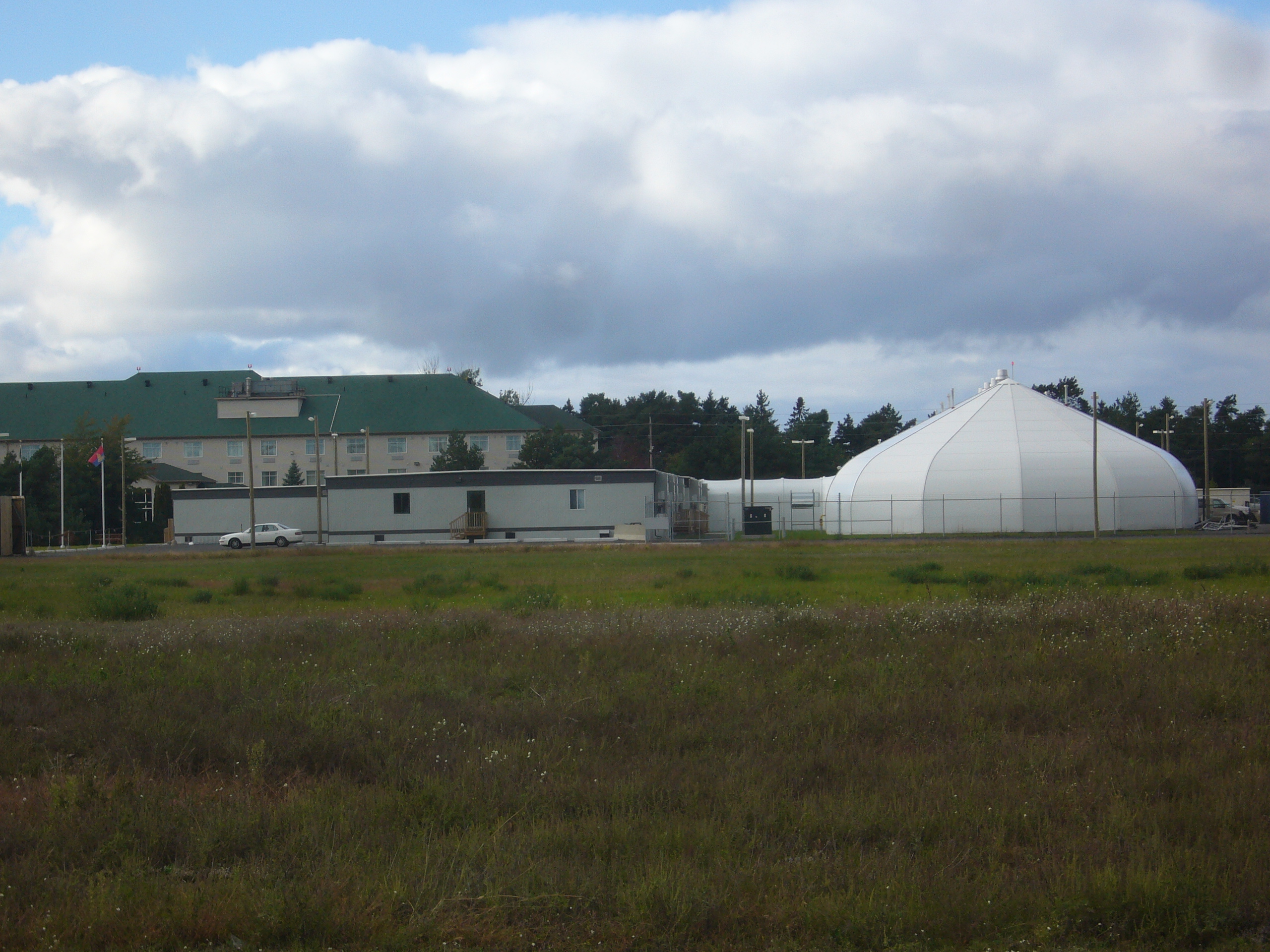
30th Field Artillery Regiment

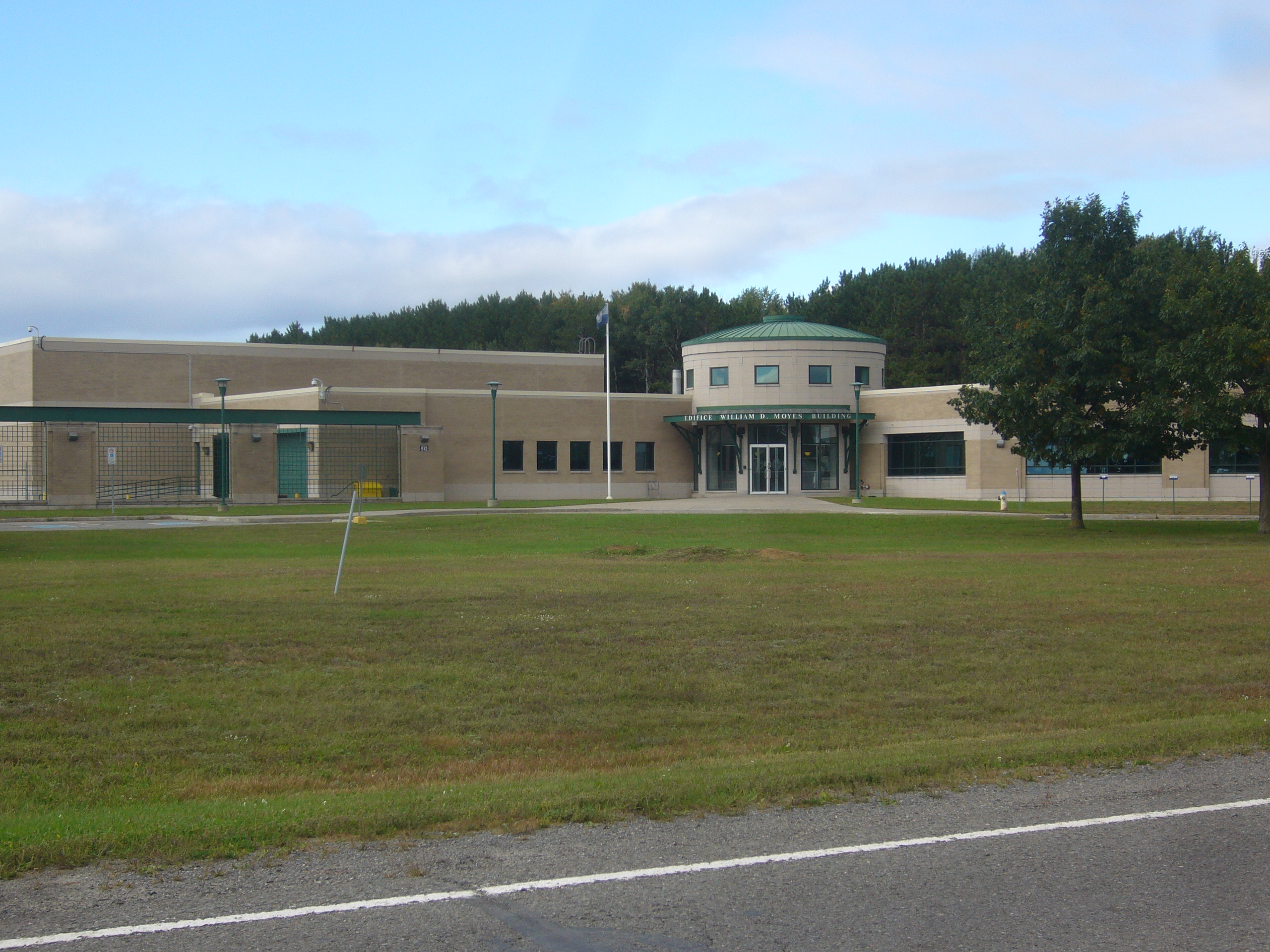
The William D Moyes Building, home of the Canadian Forces Crypto Support Unit

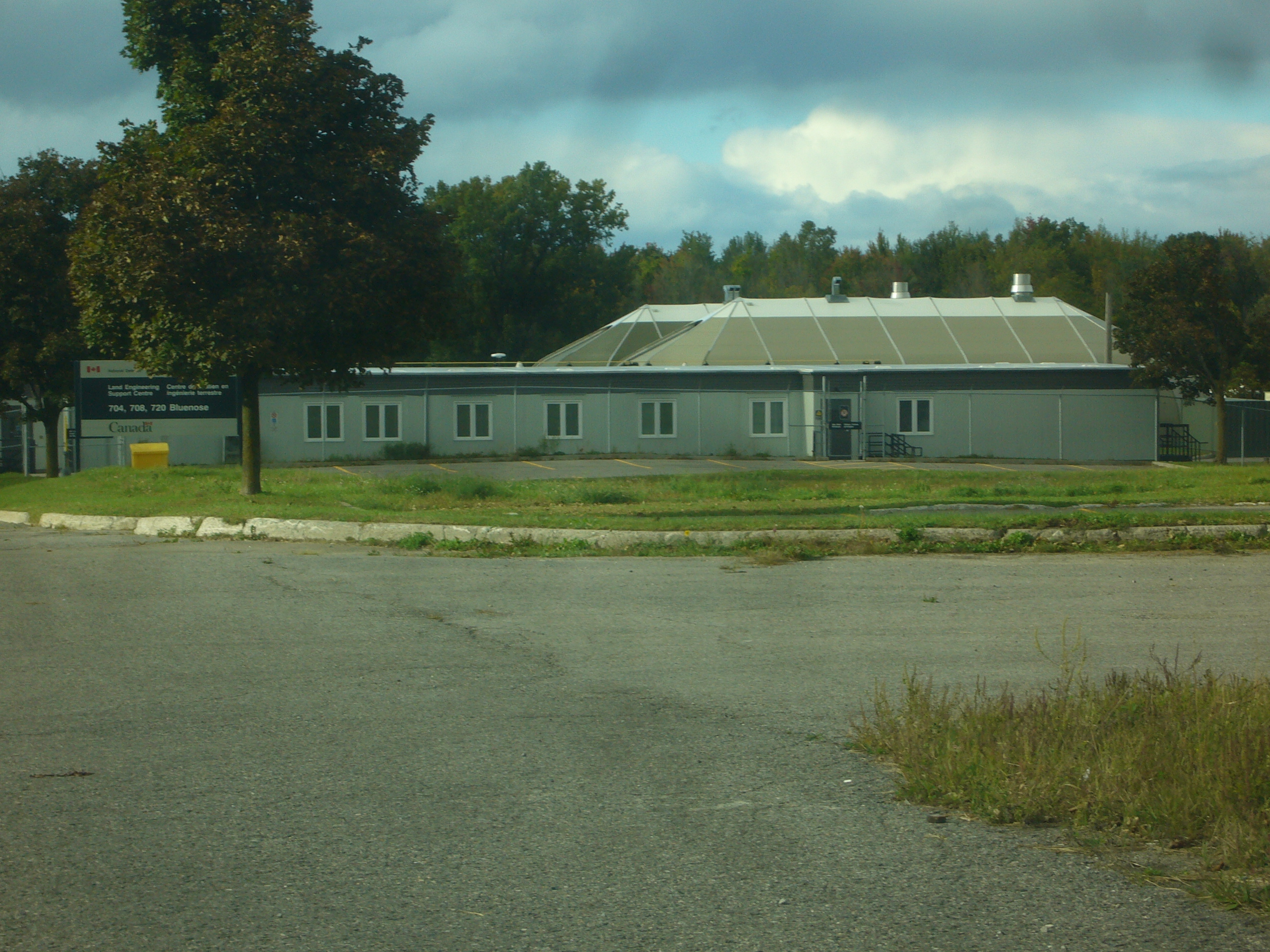
The Canadian Forces Land Engineering Support Centre

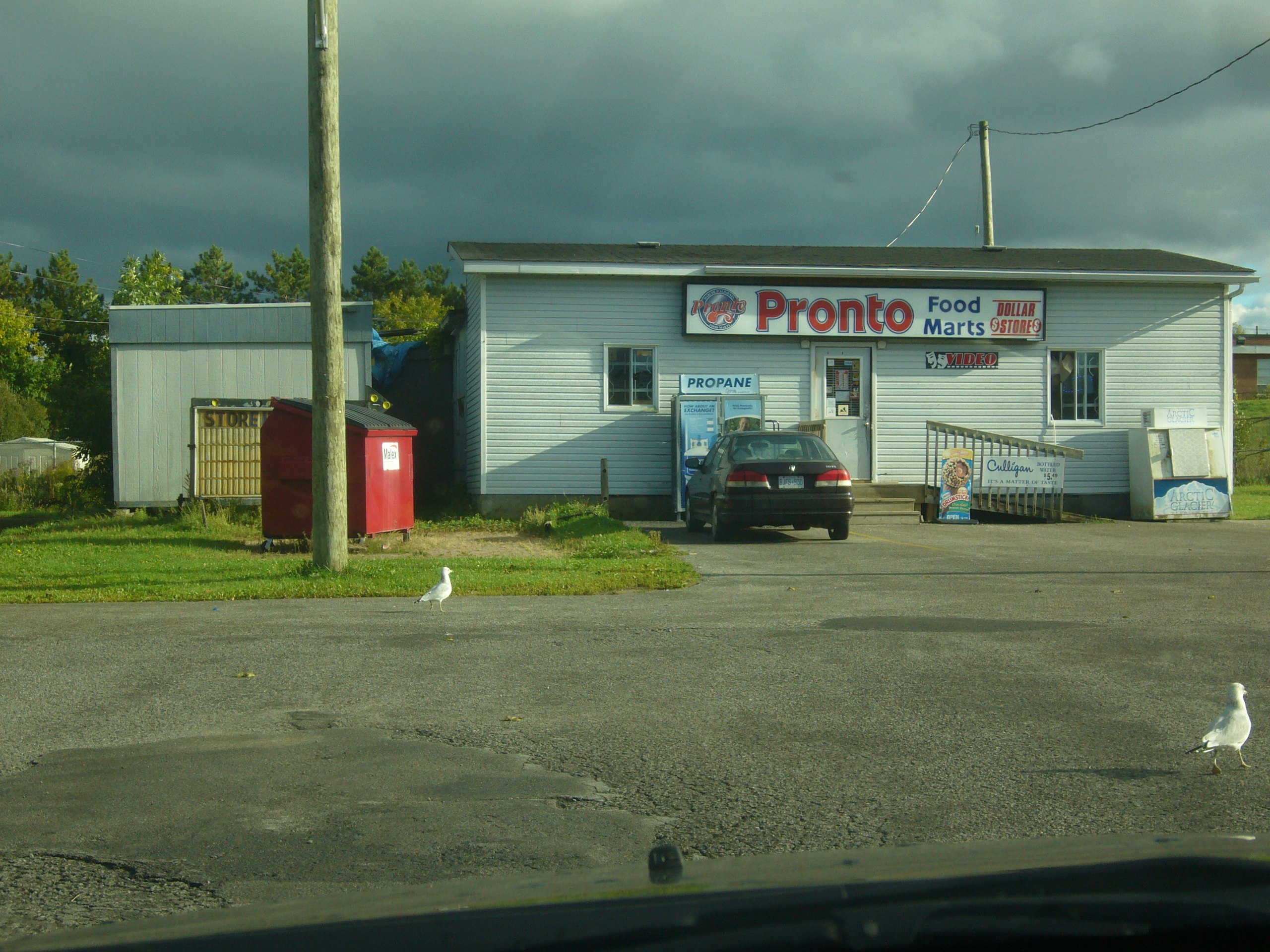
The Pronto Food Marts, a privately owned convenience store operating on the base (NOW CLOSED)

=== Housing ===
To accommodate the growing number of personnel being stationed at what was then RCAF Uplands, Order in Council PC 1961-10/10-94, dated 26 Jan 1961, authorized the Department of National Defence to build housing over approximately 45 acres of land. As a result, over 700 homes were built, varying between single-level bungalows and townhouses. Both models of homes have three bedrooms, one bathroom, and an unfinished basement. The terms of the agreement were for a period of 50 years and in 2011 the agreement was confirmed as continuing the status quo.

As of May 2013 many of the houses continue to stand in their original condition, with over 500 military members and their families currently living in them. Responsibility for the houses is divided between the Self Help Housing Organization and the Canadian Forces Housing Agency. Both SHHO and CFHA housing is rented under a minimum one-year lease and payment is made through direct payroll deductions of a military member's pay.

==== Rent controversy ====
In April 2013 the CBC published an article noting that the rent for military members living on the former base was being increased by more than would legally be allowed under Ontario law. Rent for military housing originally was geared towards a member's rank and income. Self Help Housing Organization homes are made available to junior non-commissioned members (Privates to Master Corporals) while Canadian Forces Housing Agency homes are made available to military members of any rank.

The publicly posted rent increase notice raised the monthly rent to $844 per month starting in July 2013. Military members and their families complained that this increase was unfair and unsustainable, considering a) the military member's pay increase for that year was only 1.5 percent while the rent increase was 4 percent; and b) the rental units still being in the same condition as when they were built in 1962 did not justify such a high price. As well, rent in 2003 was only $550 per month resulting in a significant increase in rent in a relatively short time period. The military and housing organizations did not respond to the article.

Rent until 2003 also included natural gas and electricity. In 2003, as the first rent increase began, tenants were also required to start paying their own utilities. SHHO replaced all the windows starting in 2003 however, with 1962 military building codes, many tenants reported substantial heating bills due to poor insulation and lowest bidder workmanship which left the windows improperly installed and sealed.

=== Schools ===
There were, at one point, at least two schools located on the grounds of CFSU Ottawa. Both were closed before September 2017:

- Elizabeth Park Public School (Ottawa-Carleton District School Board) -- The OCDSB previously made the decision to close the school and transfer students to Vimy Ridge Public School, which opened in Findlay Creek in September 2017. The lease was returned to DND. OCDSB boundary maps for the 2019–2020 school year show children living on the CFSU as attending General Vanier Public School from JK through Grade 3, Fielding Drive Public School from Grades 4 through 8 and Ridgemont High School for Grades 9 through 12.
- Uplands Catholic School (Ottawa Catholic School Board) -- At under 50% capacity, the DND had decided to terminate the lease for this school at the end of the 2016–2017 school year. Prior to 2008, students would attend this school from JK through Grade 6 before being sent to Frank Ryan Catholic Intermediate School for Grades 7 and 8 and St. Pius X High School from Grades 9 through 12. In 2009, students were given the option to continue through Frank Ryan and St. Pius X as normal or attend the new St. Francis Xavier Catholic High School in Riverside South from Grades 7 through 12. Students enrolled at Uplands Catholic were transferred to Holy Family Catholic School in September 2017. OCSB boundary maps for the 2019–2020 school year support Holy Family as the English Catholic elementary school for children living on the CFSU, with St. Patrick's High School being their successor for Grades 7 through 12.

== Historical military aircraft at Uplands ==
Several types of aircraft flew out of Uplands:

- Canadair CT-133 Silver Star fighter/trainer
- de Havilland Vampire fighter
- Avro Canada CF-100 Canuck fighter
- North American Harvard trainer
- Beechcraft Expeditor (C-45) transport
- CL-5 North Star transport
- de Havilland Comet 1A transport
- CL-44 Yukon transport
- CL-66 Cosmopolitan transport
- Dassault Falcon 20 transport
- Lockheed C-130 Hercules E and H transport
- C-47 Dakota transport
- McDonnell CF-101 Voodoo fighter
- Canadair CL-13 Sabre fighter
- North American P-51D Mustang fighter
- Boeing CH-47 Chinook heavy lift helicopter
