= 30th Field Artillery Regiment =

30th Field Artillery Regiment can refer to:

- 30th Field Artillery Regiment (Canada)
- 30th Field Artillery Regiment (United States)
