= Canadian Forces Air Transport Command =

Air Transport Command (ATC) was a command of the Canadian Forces created in 1968 upon unification and eliminated in 1975.

Significant dates:

- 5 August 1943. Formed within Air Force Headquarters as the Directorate of Air Transport Command, Ottawa, Ontario.
- 5 February 1945. Re-designated No. 9 (Transport) Group, Royal Canadian Air Force, and moved to Rockcliffe, Ontario.
- 1 April 1948. Elevated to Air Transport Command.
- 9 August 1951. Moved to RCAF Station Lachine, Quebec.
- 1 September 1959. Moved to CFB Trenton, Ontario.
- 1 February 1968. Integrated into the Canadian Armed Forces.
- 2 September 1975. Air Transport Command was redesignated Air Transport Group.

After 1968 CF ATC was responsible for providing air transport forces (strategic airlift and refueling aircraft) and to command primary air search and rescue forces for Canada and to support bases and units of other commands as directed. ATC was directly responsible for the following bases: CFB Ottawa, CFB Toronto and CFB Trenton.

During its 7 years of operation, CF ATC maintained the following squadrons at the ATC bases and other Canadian Forces air bases:

- 412 Transport Squadron - CFB Trenton
- 413 Transport and Rescue Squadron - CFB Greenwood
- 424 Squadron Transport and Rescue Squadron - CFB Trenton
- 426 Squadron Transport Training Squadron - CFB Trenton
- 429 Transport Squadron - CFB Trenton
- 435 Transport and Rescue Squadron - CFB Winnipeg
- 436 Transport Squadron - CFB Trenton
- 437 Squadron Transport Squadron - CFB Trenton
- 440 Squadron Transport Squadron - CFB Winnipeg
- 442 Squadron Transport and Rescue Squadron - CFB Comox

ATC operated the following equipment from 1968 to 1975:

- CC-137 Husky
- CC-130 Hercules
- CC-109 Cosmopolitan
- CC-117 Falcon
- CC-115 Buffalo
- CH-113 Labrador
- CC-138 Twin Otter

== Dissolution ==
Air Transport Command was eliminated in 1975 (reduced to Group status), along with Training Command and the air elements of Mobile Command and Maritime Command, when the command structure was simplified upon the creation of Canadian Forces Air Command. Air Transport Group itself was merged into 1 Canadian Air Division in 1997.
