= Edward Morrison (Canadian Army officer) =

Canadian army officer (1867-1925)

Sir Edward Morrison KCMG CB DSO
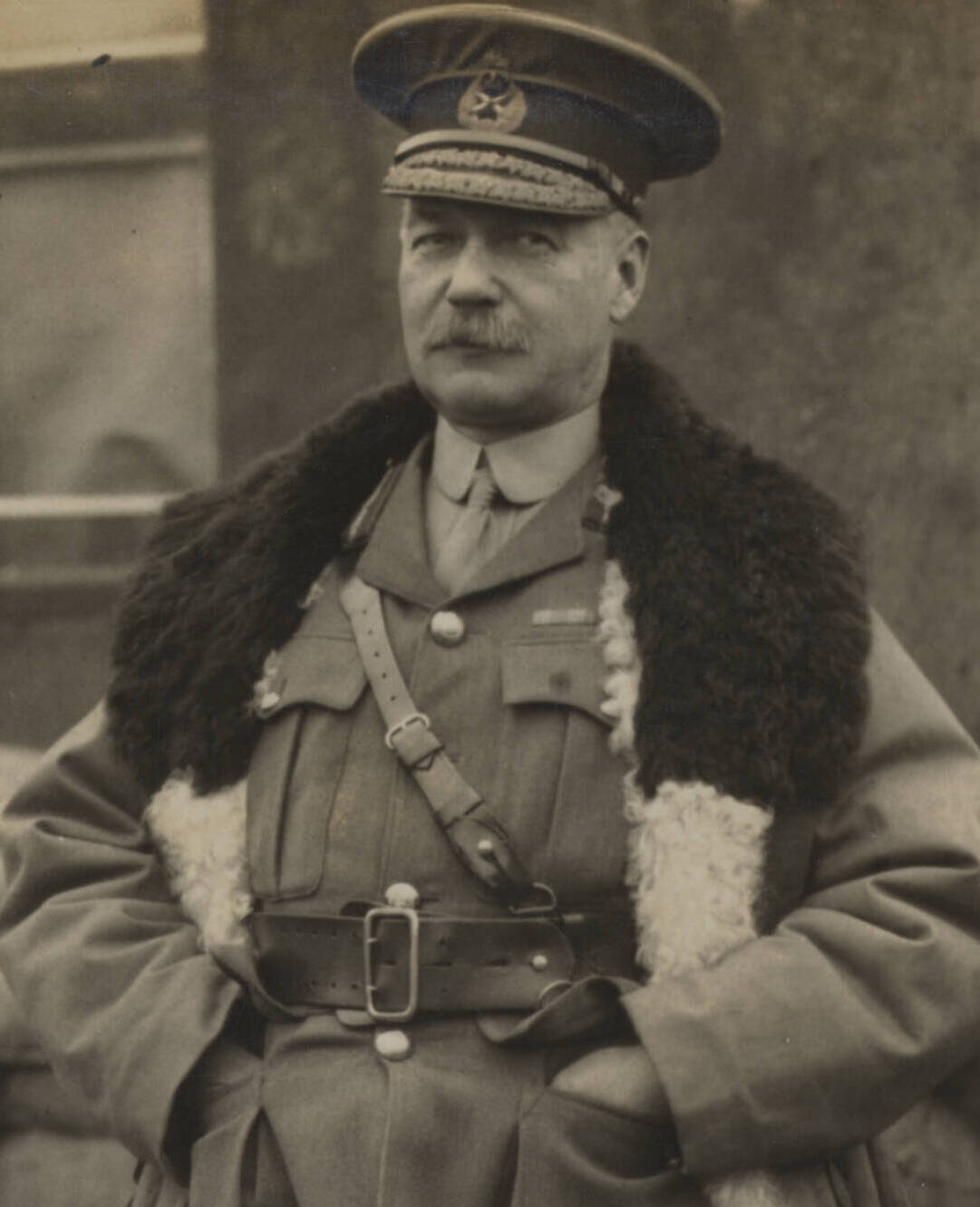
- Born: Edward Whipple Bancroft Morrison; July 6, 1867; London, Ontario
- Died: May 28, 1925 (aged 57); Ottawa, Ontario
- Military career
- Allegiance: Canada
- Branch: Canadian Army
- Service years: 1897–1924
- Rank: Major general
- Units: 4th Field Battery; 2nd Field Battery 'D' Battery, Canadian Field Artillery
- Commands: 1st Brigade, Canadian Field Artillery; Canadian Corps Artillery
- Known for: Commanding the artillery at Vimy Ridge
- Conflicts: Second Boer War: Battle of Belfast; Battle of Leliefontein; First World War: Second Battle of Ypres; Battle of the Somme; Battle of Vimy Ridge; Battle of Hill 70; Hundred Days Offensive
- Awards: Order of St Michael and St George; Order of the Bath; Distinguished Service Order; Queen's South Africa Medal; 1914–15 Star; British War Medal; Allied Victory Medal; 1902 Coronation Medal
- Other work: Editor-in-chief of the Ottawa Citizen

Sir Edward Whipple Bancroft Morrison (6 July 1867 – 28 May 1925) was a Canadian journalist and major general in the Canadian Army during World War I.

== Biography ==
Born in London, Ontario, he worked as a journalist for The Hamilton Spectator and later as editor-in-chief of the Ottawa Citizen.

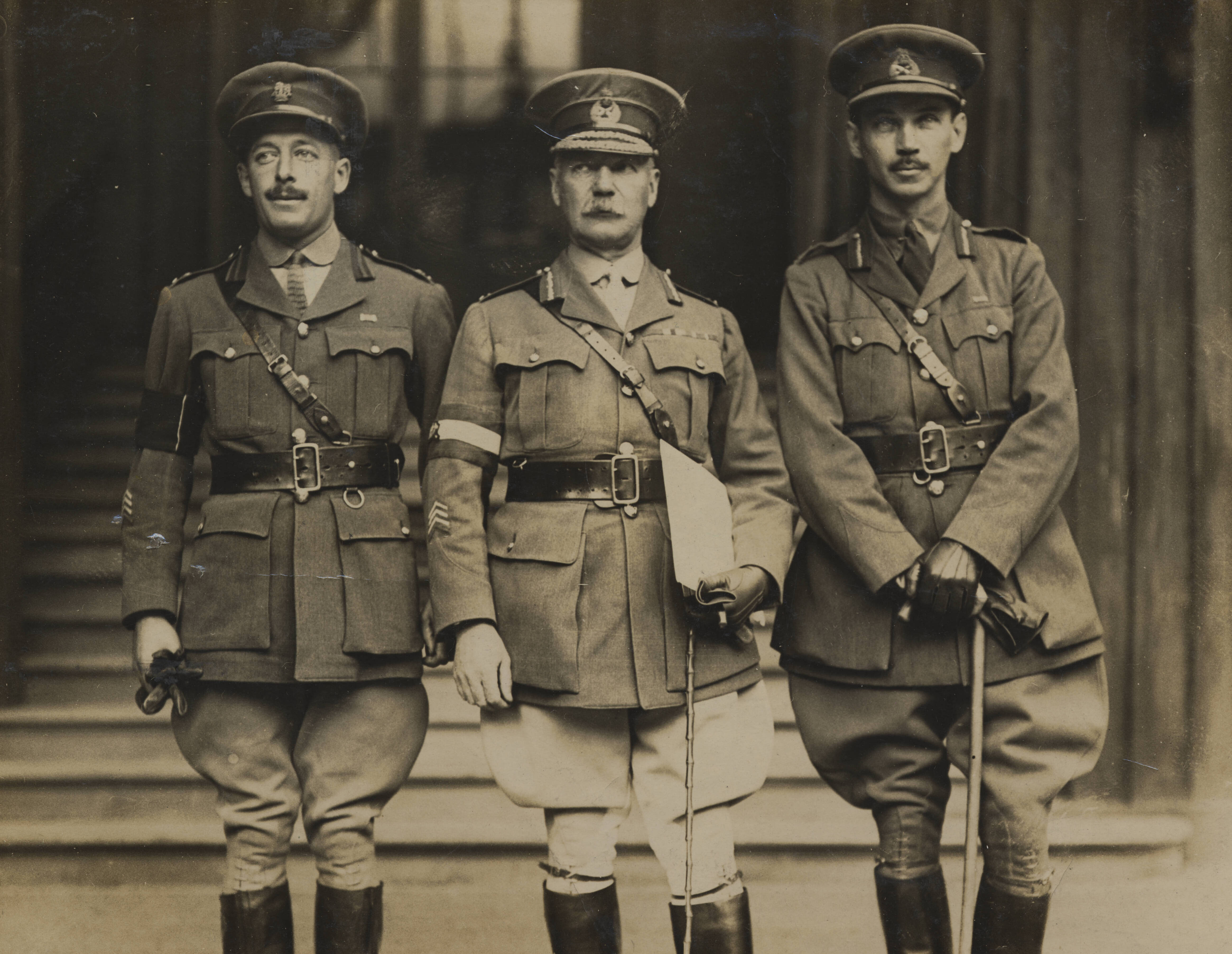
Major General E. W. B. Morrison with Major L. C. Goodeve (left) and Brigadier General C. H. Maclaren, C.R.A., 4th Canadian Division (19897834791)

Morrison served in the Canadian Militia for many years, joining the 4th Field Battery in Hamilton in May 1897, and the 2nd Field Battery in Ottawa in 1898. In 1899 he volunteered for service with 'D' Battery, Royal Canadian Artillery, in South Africa during the Second Boer War, where he fought at Belfast and Leliefontein, receiving the Distinguished Service Order for bravery at the latter battle. He published a book With the Guns in South Africa, a memoir of his service and the service of the Canadian Artillery during the Boer War.

During the First World War, Morrison served with the Canadian Expeditionary Force, commanding the 1st Brigade, Canadian Field Artillery, from 1914 until 1916, including during the Second Battle of Ypres and the Battle of the Somme. In December 1916, he was appointed to command all the artillery of the Canadian Corps, and commanded all the artillery at the Battle of Vimy Ridge. He continued to command the artillery through the Hundred Days' Offensive and was promoted to major general in July 1918.

After the war, he continued to serve with the Canadian Army until he retired in 1924.

He was made a Companion of the Order of the Bath in January 1918 and a Knight Commander of the Order of St Michael and St George in June 1919.

== Sources ==
- Biography at the Dictionary of Canadian Biography Online
- Morrison, Edward (2017). Morrison: The Long-Lost Memoir of Canada's Artillery Commander in the Great War. Faber & Faber. ISBN 978-1-77203-215-4.
