= Spitfire Kings =

Canadian military music ensemble

- Origin: Winnipeg, Manitoba
- Genre: Rock
- Years active: 2014–present
- Label: Various
- Members: Sergeant Mike Hall

The Spitfire Kings is a Royal Canadian Air Force musical group which was formerly a small ensemble of the Royal Canadian Air Force Band. While being part of the regular band as well as being an independent organization, it was based out of CFB Winnipeg in Winnipeg, Manitoba and reports to 17 Wing. The 6-piece rock band has a diverse repertoire that includes classic rock, blues and R&B.

== History ==
The ensemble was formed in 2014 as part of the CF Music Branch's effort to introduce more contemporary music in Canadian military bands. It was founded by Sergeant Mike Hall who originally joined the Canadian Forces in 2009 and was inspired to create a new musical group in the RCAF Band after performing in Afghanistan with a civilian band. The group then grew from Hall to a max of 6 musicians. Since then, the group has performed shows at the Grey Cup, the intermission of the 2016 Heritage Classic, and the Canada Games. In early May, it toured northern Canada, performing at CFS Alert and Thule Air Base on Ellesmere Island. In the summer of 2019, it released its first album which is titled Dead Reckoning, and includes 4 original tracks as well as 5 others.

== Members ==
During the war the members were:

- Leader and Founder: Sergeant Mike Hall
- Lead Vocalist: Warrant Officer David Grenon
- Vocalist and Saxophonist: Sergeant Richard Monzon
- Bass: Warrant Officer Larry Bjornson
- Guitar:
- Vocalist: Sergeant Cindy Scott
- Drums: Sergeant Jim Johnston
