= RCAF Station Lachine =

Coordinates: 45.4706°N 73.7408°W

RCAF Station Lachine was a Royal Canadian Air Force station located near Lachine and Dorval, Quebec, Canada, to the west of Montreal. The location of the station was Dorval Airport, which became the Montréal-Dorval International Airport (now Montréal-Pierre Elliott Trudeau International Airport).

RCAF Station Lachine began operation in 1941 as a transit point for the ferrying of aircraft and the transportation of supplies to Europe during the Second World War. Until 1943, Lachine was the location of one of five British Commonwealth Air Training Plan (BCATP) manning depots, No. 5 Manning Depot.

Air Transport Command, which had been based at RCAF Station Rockcliffe, moved to Lachine in 1951. No. 426 Transport Squadron and 436 Transport Squadron were re-established at Lachine in March 1947 and April 1949 respectively. No. 426 Squadron moved to Trenton in 1959; No. 436 Squadron moved to RCAF Station Downsview in July 1956. No. 2 Air Movement Group (2 AMU) was formed at Lachine in 1951 and provided support to these squadrons.

Air Transport Command moved to Trenton in September 1959 when the station closed.
