= Royal Canadian Air Force Pipes and Drums =

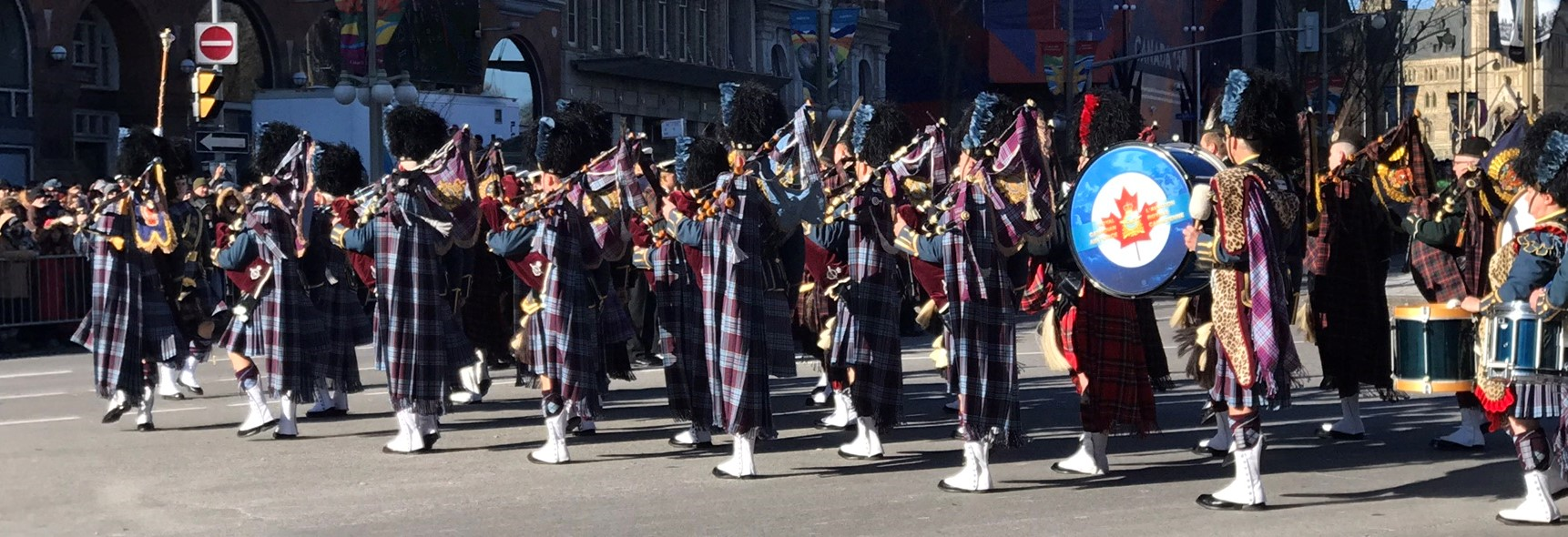
- Members of the pipe band during a Remembrance Day ceremony at the National War Memorial in 2017.
- Active: 7 October 1949–Present
- Allegiance: Canada
- Branch: Royal Canadian Air Force
- Type: Military Band/Pipe Band
- Role: Public Duties
- Size: 40
- Garrison/HQ: CFB Uplands, Ottawa
- March: RCAF March Past

The Royal Canadian Air Force Pipes and Drums (RCAFPD) is a military pipe band unit composed of current members of the Royal Canadian Air Force. The unit was formally established in October 1949 and is the longest continuous serving Air Force Pipe Band in the Canadian Forces. All of its 40 members are volunteers who are drawn from both the military and civilian sphere. At the time of its foundation, it was known as the RCAF Station Rockcliffe Pipe Band.

== Operations ==
The band usually performs for RCAF change of command ceremonies, military funerals, and other major occasions in the National Capital Region. Each year, band leads the Remembrance Day parade in Ottawa near the National War Memorial, and even provides a lone piper to play Lament during the honors ceremony. It has participated in all RCAF Presentation of Colours ceremonies, whether it be official such as the ceremony in 2017 in Toronto, as well as a symbolic presentation of the old RCAF colours at Air Canada Centre to the Toronto Maple Leafs. During the latter, the two pipers from the band took part in the ceremony while the band was in full composition during the former. The band took part in a 75th anniversary ceremony on Parliament Hill in recognition of the Battle of Britain in September 2015. In 2018, the band took part in the Virginia International Tattoo. It celebrated its platinum jubilee in the fall of 2019.

== Uniforms ==
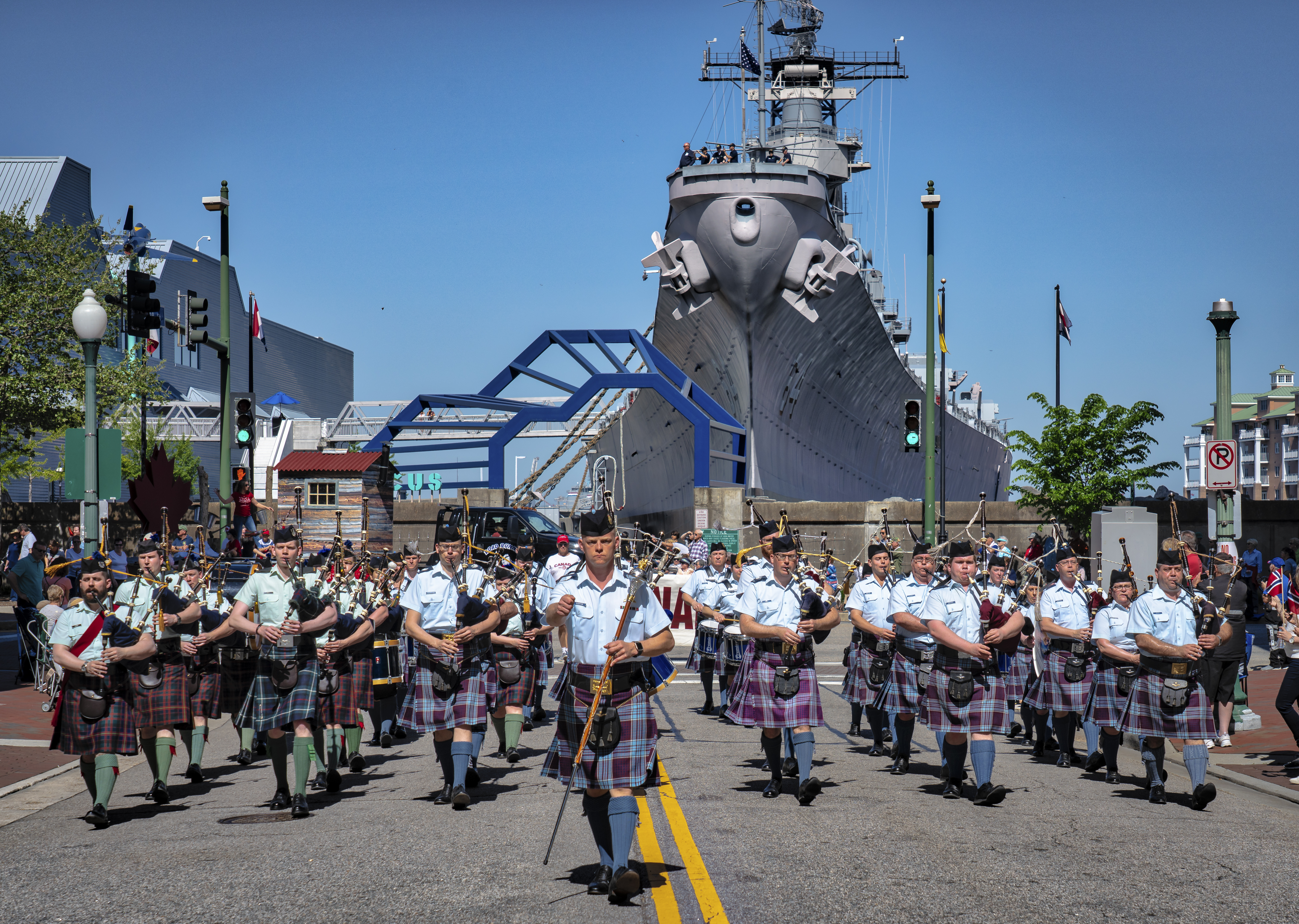
The RCAF Pipes and Drums marching during the 2018 Norfolk NATO Parade.

The Pipe Band wear a modified highland dress that features Scottish uniforms augmented with a kilt patterned in the RCAF Tartan. The tartan was created in 1942 by Captain Elmer Fullerton from the No. 9 Service Flying Training School RCAF. He wanted the tartan to reflect his Scottish heritage for his station band. It was approved by the Air Council and was subsequently sent to the Lord Lyon King of Arms on 13 July 1942 to request it become the official RCAF tartan.

== Notable members ==
- Thomas J. Brown, pipe major from October 2010 to 2015.
- Jack Gauthier, a 58-year veteran of the band and a member of the Ottawa Police Service Pipe Band.

== See also ==
- Royal Canadian Air Force Band
- Central Band of the Canadian Armed Forces
