= 30th Field Artillery Regiment, RCA =

- 30^{e} Régiment d'artillerie de campagne, ARC (French)
- Active: 1855
- Country: Canada
- Branch: Canadian Army
- Type: Artillery
- Role: Assist in the defeat of the enemy with indirect fire as part of the all-arms battle; Represent Canada and the RCA as the National Salute Troop, firing salutes for special occasions, visiting heads of state and national periods of remembrance or mourning
- Size: Regiment (2 batteries and a regimental headquarters troop)
- Part of: The Royal Regiment of Canadian Artillery (RCA)
- Garrison/HQ: Morrison Artillery Park (MAP) at Canadian Forces Support Unit (Ottawa) - Uplands Site, Ontario
- Nickname: The Bytown Gunners
- Patron: St. Barbara
- Mottos: Latin: Quo fas et gloria ducunt, lit. 'Whither right and glory lead'
- Colours: The guns of The Royal Regiment of Canadian Artillery themselves
- March: Slow march: Royal Artillery Slow March; Quick march (dismounted parades): British Grenadiers; Trot past: Keel Row
- Anniversaries: 27 September 1855: 2nd "Ottawa" Battery authorized (date used by 30 Fd Regt RCA as its unit anniversary); 30 Fd Regt RCA originated in Ottawa on 9 May 1905 when a Special General Order (GO) authorized the forming of the 8th Brigade of Field Artillery, CA from the 2nd "Ottawa" Battery and the 23rd Battery
- Weapon system: 105 mm Howitzer, C3
- Battle honours: The word Latin: Ubique, lit. 'Everywhere', takes the place of all past and future battle honours in recognition of the artillery's widespread service in all battles and campaigns since its creation
- Website: www.army-armee.forces.gc.ca/en/4-canadian-division/30-field-artillery-regiment/index.page

Commanders
- Commanding officer (CO): Lieutenant-Colonel S.L. Brush CD
- Regimental Sergeant Major (RSM): Chief Warrant Officer S.C. Chase CD

Insignia
- Unit abbreviation: 30 Fd Regt RCA (French: 30 RAC ARC)
- Headdress: Dark blue beret

The 30th Field Artillery Regiment, RCA (French: 30^{e} Régiment d'artillerie de campagne, ARC) is a bilingual Canadian Army (Primary Reserve) artillery regiment located in Ottawa, Ontario, and is allocated to 33 Canadian Brigade Group, 4th Canadian Division. The unit parades at a new complex at the Canadian Forces Support Unit (Ottawa) - Uplands Site following the collapse of their former location at CFRB Dows Lake under the weight of snow in 2009. The unit performs ceremonial gun salute duties when required in the National Capital area, and is a field unit equipped with 105 mm Howitzers, C3.

== Allocated batteries ==
- 1st Field Battery, RCA, the Leadership and Recruit Training Battery (internal designation)
- 2nd Field Battery, RCA, the Firing Battery (internal designation)
- 25th Field Battery, RCA (allocated, inactive)

== Lineage ==
=== 2nd Field Battery, RCA ===
The Volunteer Militia Field Battery of Artillery of Ottawa City (later re-designated the 2nd (Ottawa) Field Battery, and currently 2nd Field Battery, RCA) was formed on 27 September 1855 under the provisions of the Militia Act of 1855, and is therefore one of the oldest active Reserve batteries in the Royal Canadian Artillery.

=== 30th Field Artillery Regiment, RCA ===
- Originated 9 May 1905 in Ottawa, Ontario as the 8th Brigade of Field Artillery, CA
- Redesignated 2 February 1920 as the 1st Brigade, CFA
- Redesignated 1 July 1925 as the 1st Field Brigade, CA
- Redesignated 3 June 1935 as the 1st Field Brigade, RCA
- Redesignated 7 November 1940 as the 1st (Reserve) Field Brigade, RCA
- Redesignated 1 March 1943 as the 1st (Reserve) Field Regiment, RCA
- Redesignated 1 April 1946 as the 30th Field Regiment, RCA
- Redesignated 12 April 1960 as the 30th Field Artillery Regiment, RCA

Although 30th Field Regiment holds no direct lineal connection to earlier artillery regiments raised in Ottawa before 1905, 2 Battery itself has remained in continuous service since its formation in 1855, first as an independent unit, and later incorporated under several successive regimental organizations.

== Operational history ==
=== Early history 1855 - 1901 ===
Gun detachments of No. 2 (Ottawa) Field Battery were deployed with Canadian militia forces guarding the United States border along the St. Lawrence River during the Fenian Raids of 1866 and 1870/71, serving at key border posts including Cornwall, Ontario and Fort Wellington.

From 1899 to 1901, individual members of No. 2 (Ottawa) Field Battery volunteered for overseas service in South Africa with 'D' Battery, Royal Canadian Artillery as part of Canada's contribution of troops to British Imperial forces in the Boer War.

=== First World War ===
Artillery gun and crew

The 1st Field Artillery Brigade, CFA, CEF was authorized on 6 August 1914, incorporating the 2nd (Howitzer) Battery, CFA from Ottawa. The brigade embarked for Britain on 27 September 1914, and disembarked in France on 12 February 1915, where it provided artillery support as part of the 1st Canadian Division's Divisional Artillery in France and Flanders until the end of the war.

While serving as the brigade's medical officer, Lieutenant-Colonel John McCrae MD composed the poem In Flanders Fields in 1915 after conducting the burial of Lieutenant Alexis Helmer, a young artillery officer from Ottawa. Major-General Sir Edward Whipple Bancroft Morrison, the brigade's first Commanding Officer, later rose to command the artillery of the Canadian Corps during the latter stages of the war, including the victory at the Battle of Vimy Ridge in 1917 and during the Hundred Days' Offensive in 1918.

The 1st Field Artillery Brigade, CFA, CEF disbanded on 23 October 1920.

=== Second World War ===
While not mobilized for overseas service, the 1st (Reserve) Field Brigade, RCA trained and contributed several of its component batteries (in multiple roles) to various RCA regiments raised for service with the Canadian Army overseas during the Second World War from 1939 to 1945.

The 2nd (Ottawa) Field Battery (Howitzer) was mobilized in 1939 as the 2nd Field Battery, 4th Field Regiment, RCA with the 2nd Canadian Division, seeing action during the Invasion of Normandy and the Battle of the Scheldt during the Liberation of the Netherlands in 1944.

The 51st Field Battery was re-roled to anti-tank artillery, and mobilized as part of the 1st Anti-Tank Regiment, RCA with the 1st Canadian Division. The battery served with the division throughout the Invasion of Sicily and later the Italian Campaign (1943-1945), before joining the 1st Canadian Army in North-West Europe in March 1945 for the Liberation of the Netherlands and Western Allied invasion of Germany.

=== War In Afghanistan ===
The regiment contributed individual augmentees to the various Task Forces which served in Afghanistan between 2002 and 2014.

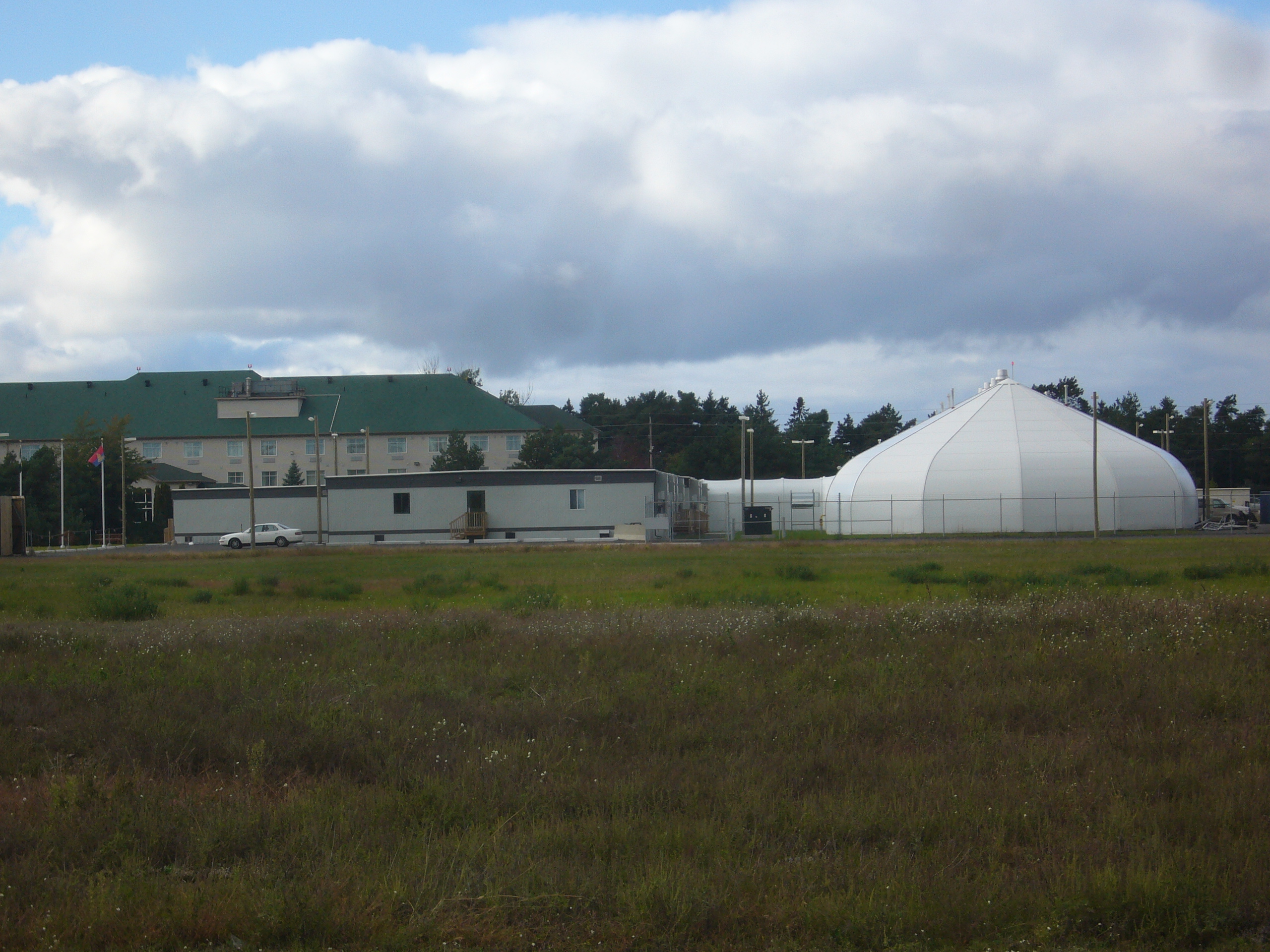
Garrison at Morrison Artillery Park (MAP)

=== UN Missions ===
- UNMOGIP - India/Pakistan
- UNEF 2 - Egypt
- UNDOF - Golan Heights
- UNFICYP - Cyprus
- UNPROFOR - Former Republic of Yugoslavia
- SFOR - Bosnia-Herzegovina
- MONUC - Congo

=== Domestic Operations ===
Members of the unit have taken part in:

- Operation Lentus - Ontario and Quebec (2019 and 2017)
- Operation Cadence - Ontario (2011)
- Operation Recuperation - Ontario (1998)
- Operation Assistance - Manitoba (1997).

=== Current Operations ===
Members of the unit have recently taken part in:

- Operation REASSURANCE - Latvia
- Operation IMPACT - Middle East
- Operation CALUMET - Sinai Peninsula
- Operation UNIFIER - Ukraine, United Kingdom

== Museum ==
In 2013, the regiment officially established and had certified, a regimental museum called The Bytown Gunners Firepower Museum. Since that time, this museum has continued to develop into a significant OMMC military museum open to the general public based upon reservations.

== Notable people ==
- Lieutenant-Colonel John McCrae, MD (30 November 1872 – 28 January 1918) best known for writing the famous war memorial poem In Flanders Fields. At the outbreak of the First World War he immediately volunteered for service either as a doctor or as a gunner. Appointed surgeon to the 1st Brigade, Canadian Field Artillery, he achieved both roles; acting as the brigade's unofficial second-in-command, and performing both gunnery and medical duties until fully transferred to duties with the Royal Canadian Army Medical Corps in mid-1915. The 1st Field Brigade, CFA, now disbanded, is perpetuated by the 30th Field Artillery Regiment.
- Major-General Sir Edward Whipple Bancroft Morrison, CB, KCMG, DSO (6 July 1867 – 28 May 1925), who commanded the artillery of the Canadian Corps during the First World War. He joined the 2nd (Ottawa) Field Battery in 1898, before volunteering for service in the Boer War with 'D' Battery, Royal Canadian Artillery, and was awarded the Distinguished Service Order (although recommended for the Victoria Cross) for saving guns from capture at the Battle of Leliefontein. Commanded the 1st Field Brigade, Canadian Field Artillery, CEF at the outbreak of the First World War. Both a war correspondent and journalist in civilian life, he also worked as the editor-in-chief of the Ottawa Citizen newspaper. 30th Field Artillery Regiment's current armoury, Morrison Artillery Park, is named in his honour.
- Captain George G. Blackburn CM, MC (February 3, 1917 – November 15, 2006), Forward Observation Officer during the Second World War; playwright, journalist and author of a well-regarded memoire of his military experiences in North-West Europe during 1944 and 1945.
- Lieutenant-General (Ret'd) Andrew Leslie CMM MSC MSM CD PC, retired Canadian Armed Forces lieutenant-general who served as Chief of Transformation and earlier as Chief of the Land Staff. He was the Member of Parliament for the riding of Orléans, from the October 19, 2015, federal election until he stood down at the 2019 Canadian federal election. He joined the 30th Field Artillery Regiment in 1977 while at the University of Ottawa. In 1981 he transferred to the Regular Force.

== Precedence ==
Preceded by 26th Field Artillery Regiment, RCA	30th Field Artillery Regiment, RCA	Succeeded by 42nd Field Artillery Regiment (Lanark and Renfrew Scottish), RCA

== See also ==
- Military history of Canada
- History of the Canadian Army
- Canadian Forces
- List of armouries in Canada
