= Central Band of the Canadian Armed Forces =

- Musique centrale des Forces armées canadiennes
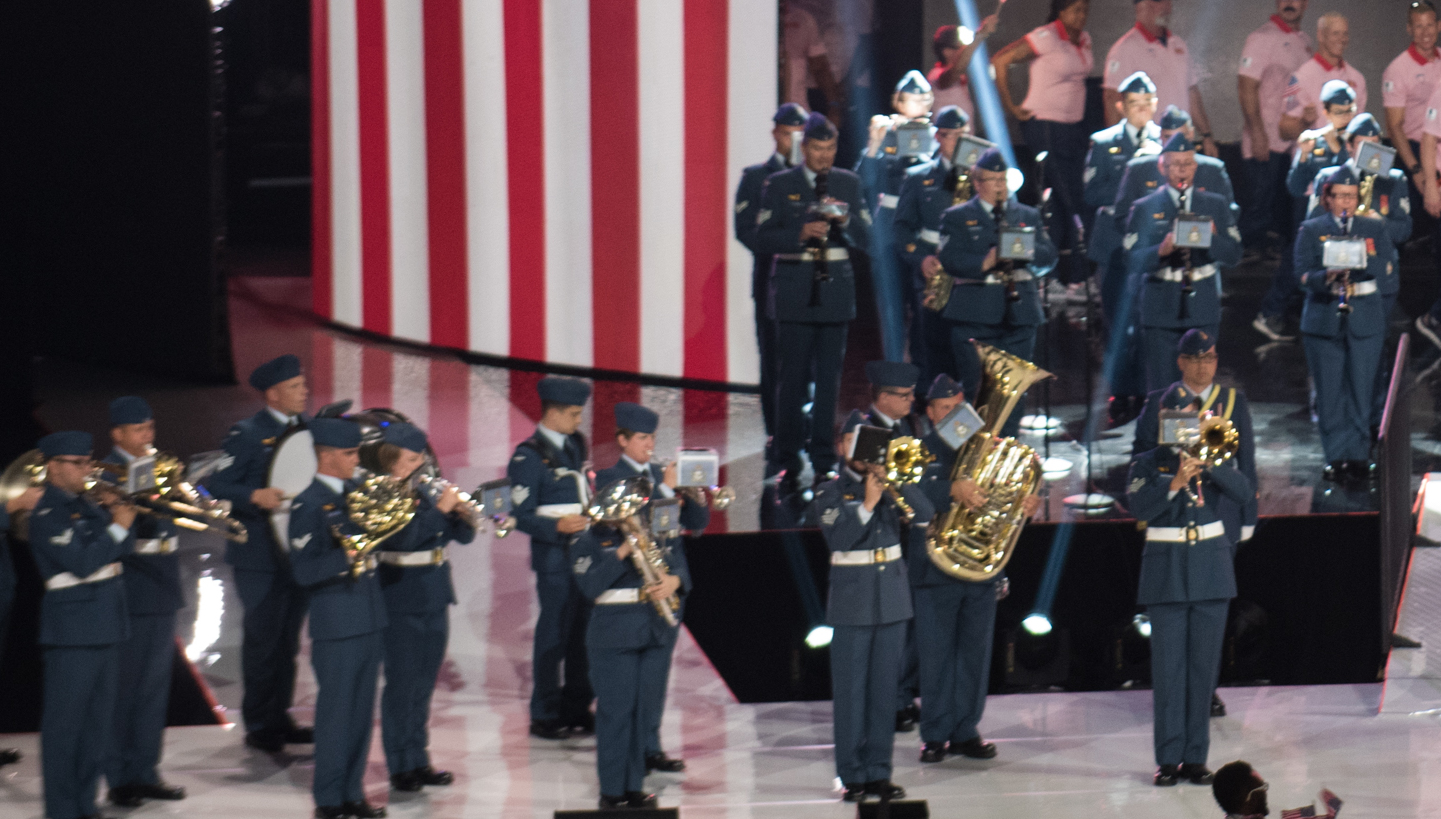
- The CAF Central Band at Air Canada Centre for the opening ceremony of the 2017 Invictus Games.
- Active: 1968; 58 years ago
- Country: Canada
- Branch: Royal Canadian Air Force
- Type: Military band
- Size: 41-piece band
- Part of: Canadian Forces Support Group (Ottawa-Gatineau)
- Headquarters: CFB Uplands, Ottawa
- Motto: Cantus non oblitus (Latin for 'The song is not forgotten')
- Website: www.forces.gc.ca/en/caf-community-bases-wings-cfsu-ottawa/services.page

Commanders
- Commanding Officer and Director of Music: Captain Christine Davies
- Senior Warrant Officer: Master Warrant Officer Megan Driscoll
- Notable commanders: Jack Kopstein (assistant director from 1979–1981)

The Central Band of the Canadian Armed Forces (French: Musique centrale des Forces armées canadiennes) is one of six full-time Regular Force military bands in the Canadian Armed Forces. It is also the most senior military band in the CAF. The band provides professional musical support for the representative institutions of the Canadian Forces, supporting the Department of National Defence and the Government of Canada, in events throughout the National Capital Region.

The Central Band of the CAF plays by permission of the Commandant of Canadian Forces Support Group (Ottawa–Gatineau) in Ottawa, and like all Regular Force military bands, is composed solely of auditioned, military-qualified musicians. Because of its previous history as the Royal Canadian Air Force's premier band, musicians parade and attend functions in the RCAF's uniform.

== History ==
The band was originally created in 1940 as the Central Band of the RCAF (Royal Canadian Air Force) in preparation for the visit of Prince George, Duke of Kent. By 1964, the Central Band of the RCAF became the only air force band in service prior to the unification of the Canadian Armed Forces. In February 1968, the RCAF band merged with the Royal Canadian Horse Artillery Band to become the National Band of the Canadian Armed Forces, which had servicemen from the Army, Navy, and Air Force in its ranks. Its first performance was given at a NATO festival in 1968. It was given its current name in 1970. Under its first director of music, Lieutenant Commander William J Gordon, the band established itself as a senior band in the Canadian Forces, performing with the United States Army Field Band at Centennial Concert Hall in Winnipeg in 1970. In 1974, Lynn Hong, who was the first woman to join a military band in Canada, joined the band at the request of Major Derek Stannard. In March 1991, as Operation Desert Storm was being honoured by the Toronto Blue Jays in a ceremony titled "Welcome Home!" the Central Band threw the first ball as they were opening the team's first game of the season.

=== List of directors ===
- M. Boundy (1940–1942)
- Flying Officer E.A. Kirkwood (1942–1954)
- S. Vowden (1954–1955)
- Flight Lieutenant L.D. Corcoran (1955–1960)
- W. Boyce (1960–1963)
- K.R. Moore (1963–1968)
- Lieutenant Commander William J Gordon (1968–1972)
- Major Derek Stannard (1972–1984)
- Major K. Swanwick (1984–1986)
- Major J.A. Underwood (1986–1987)
- Major R. McCallum (1987–1990)
- Major R.H.J. French (1990–1992)
- Major J.D.D. Bouchard (1992–1994)
- Major K.R. Killingbeck (1994–1999)
- Major J.G.G. Bouchard (1999–2001)
- Major J.G.P.A. Pineault (2001–2004)
- Major Gerry Heslip (2004–2008)
- Major Brian Greenwood (2008–2010)
- Captain Peter Archibald (2010–2012)
- Major Dave Shaw (2012–2016)
- Captain John Fullerton (2016–2020)
- Captain Marie-Perle Broadley (2020–2022)
- Captain Catherine Norris (2022–present)

== Recognition and activities ==
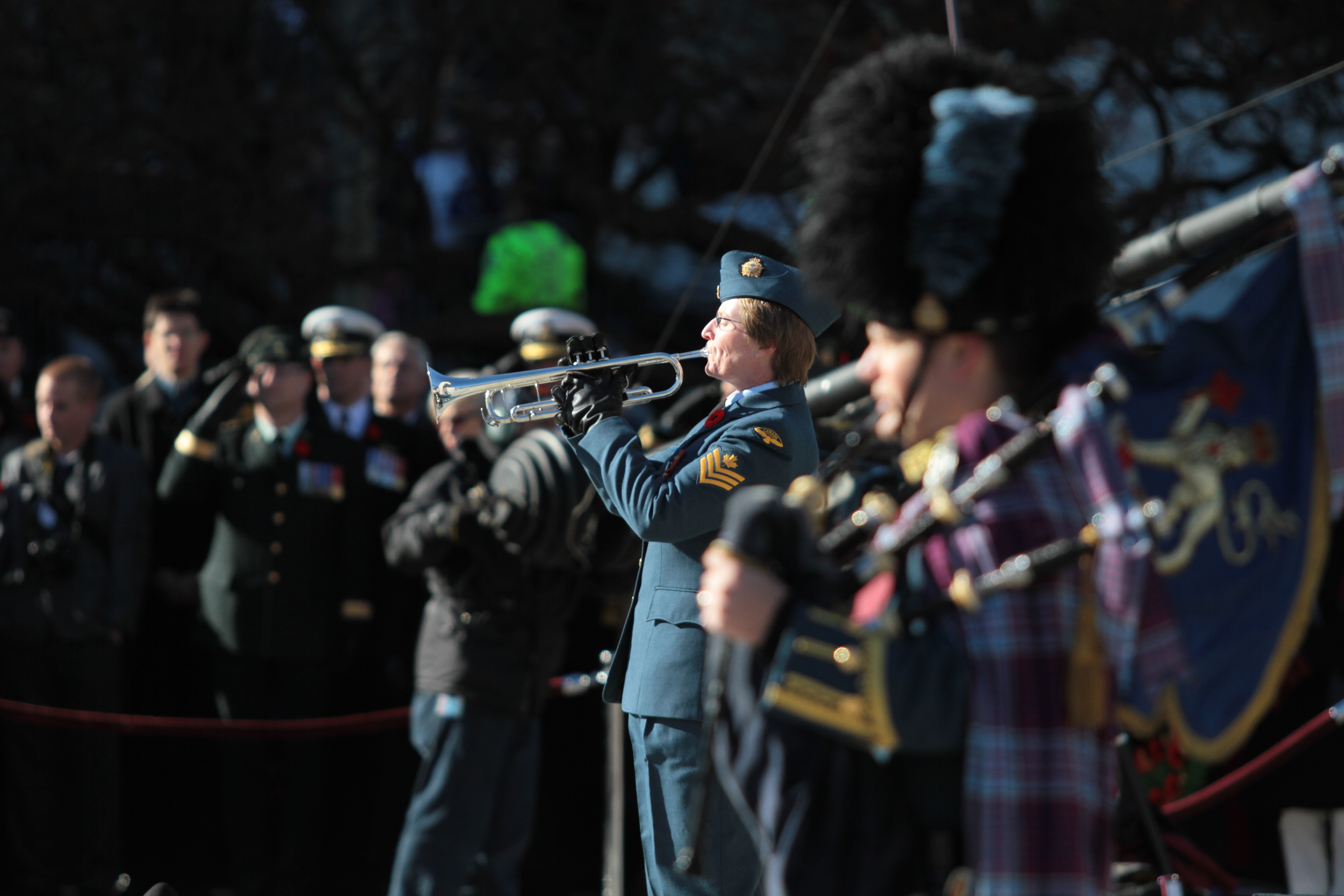
A trumpeter with CF Central Band during the Remembrance Day celebrations at National War Memorial in Ottawa.

For over 70 years, the Central Band of the Canadian Armed Forces has provided professional musical support for military and Government of Canada events. The band regularly performs for Canadian Royalty, the Governor General of Canada and Prime Minister of Canada, as well as foreign Heads of State, and government. It has also performed at many public concerts throughout Canada and around the world. The band used to give annual performances during the changing of the guard ceremony on Parliament Hill each summer until 1979 when those duties were assumed by the Band of the Ceremonial Guard. It also takes part in the Swearing-in ceremony of the Governor General of Canada. The band has also toured Europe frequently and has made appearances at several NATO music festivals. The band performed alongside the Band of Royal 22nd Regiment during the 2017 Invictus Games opening and closing ceremony.

== Composition ==
The following ensembles serve within the CAF Central Band:

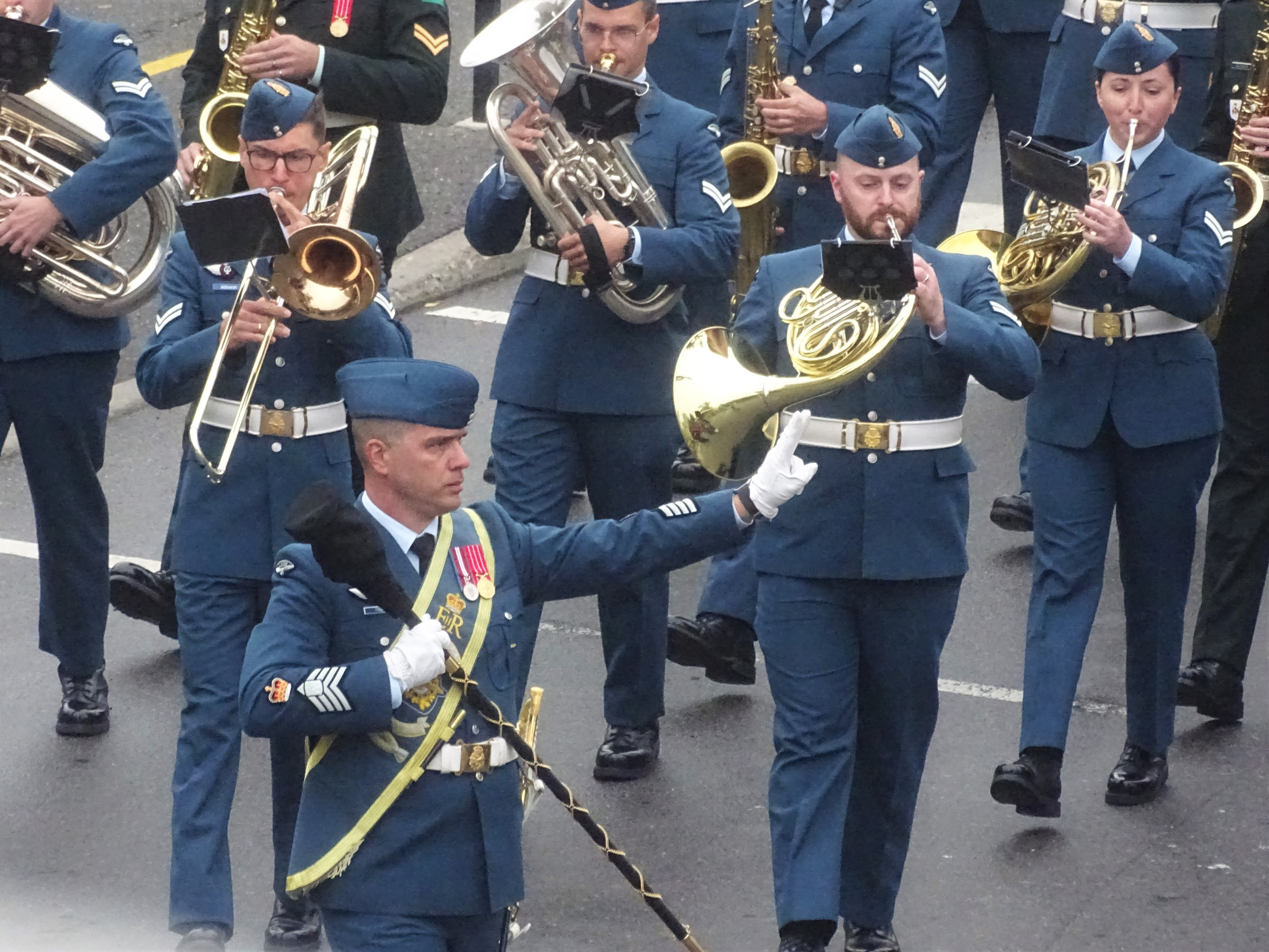
CF Central Band performing at the military parade held in honour of the death of Queen Elizabeth II in Ottawa.

- Concert Band
- Parade Band
- Big Band
- Jazz Combo
- Serenade of Strings ensemble
- 2 Brass Quintets
- Woodwind Quintet
- Cormorant Chamber Trio

Five members of the band constitute the Canadian Forces Serenade of Strings who regularly perform at functions of the Governor General at Rideau Hall. On occasion, it is augmented with flute and clarinet players.

== Albums ==
The Central Band of the CAF has released the following albums:

- Les Français (1975)
- Voisée (1983)
- Canada Remembers (1996)
- Masque (2007)
- The Central Band in Concert (2019)
- Canada 1867 (Unknown)
- Canadian Forces Present the Central Band (Unknown)
- Show Stoppers for Band (Unknown)

== See also ==
- Canadian military bands
- Royal Canadian Air Force Band
- The Pipes and Drums of The Cameron Highlanders of Ottawa
- Governor General's Foot Guards Band
- La Musique du Royal 22e Régiment
