= 436 Transport Squadron =

- Active: 1944–1946, 1949–current
- Disbanded: 1946
- Country: Canada
- Branch: (Canada) Royal Canadian Air Force
- Role: Transport
- Part of: 8 Wing
- Current base: RAF Gujrat, British India 1944–1945; RAF Akyab (Island), British India 1945; RAF Down Ampney, England 1945–1946; RCAF Dorval 1949–1956; RCAF Downsview 1956–1964; RCAF Uplands 1964–1971; CFB Trenton 1971–present
- Motto(s): "Onus Portamus" ("We Carry The Load")
- Squadron badge: Elephant head with a log
- Equipment: air transports
- Battle honours: Burma 1944–45, Afghanistan

Aircraft flown
- Transport: C-47 Dakota, CC-130 Hercules E, H models, CC-130J Super Hercules

436 Transport Squadron is a unit of the Royal Canadian Air Force. It currently operates the CC-130J Super Hercules from 8 Wing Trenton in Trenton, Ontario.

== History ==
Loading a 436 Dakota in Gujrat, India

436 Transport Squadron was originally a squadron of the Royal Canadian Air Force (RCAF). The unit was assembled in Gujrat, (then) India on 9 October 1944. Equipped with the C-47 Dakota, 436 Squadron flew its first official mission on 15 January 1945 from Kanglatongbi, Assam, India, when seven Dakotas airlifted 59 tons of supplies for 33 Corps of the Allied 14th Army in Burma. Soon the adopted emblem of the squadron, "Canucks Unlimited," would be seen far and wide in the China-Burma-India (CBI) theatre of operations.

According to news reports of the day, "in the first 18 days after W/C Ralph Gordon's RCAF Dakota transport squadron reached its present aircraft complement, it led all Dakota squadrons in tonnage carried to the Mandalay and Irrawaddy front. To save time the aircrew on the squadron voted to eat dry rations between sorties instead of using time over a cooked meal. The time for an engine change has been cut from three to two days without a loss of efficiency under the direction of F/L H. Webb, Caledonia, Ont., the engineering officer.”

In April 1945, 436 Squadron was ordered to move its operations from Akyab Island in the Bay of Bengal down the coast to Ramree Island. C-47 KN210 piloted by F.L. Denison was carrying a load of bricks to build ovens to serve the squadron's new home. The weight had been miscalculated and, during the flight, the aircraft could barely maintain altitude. At this point, L.A.C. Art Adams spotted a beached Japanese seaplane. Someone shouted, "Let's get rid of some bricks!" The door was opened and a couple of low passes were made, during which Art proceeded to throw bricks at the seaplane. No signs of life were seen down below, and it is doubtful whether any damage was actually inflicted. It must, however, be the only case in which bricks were used to bomb the enemy during the war.

Belonging to No. 229 Group RAF, 436 Squadron was part of a RAF-USAF-RCAF force known as "the Combat Cargo Task Force". On 31 August 1945, following cessation of hostilities, the squadron was relocated to RAF Down Ampney, Glouchestershire in the UK after having logged over 36,000 flight hours and airlifting over 29,000 tons of supplies and 15,000 troops, casualties, and passengers. Although the first Far East Canadian transport squadron to be formed, 436 Squadron was the last to leave for England.

According to a Canadian Press Cable story reporting from London on 20 September 1945, W/C Dick Dennison of Winnipeg, "the squadron in the east flew more than 6,000,000 miles and was known as 'Canucks Unlimited'."

Following ten months of transport work in post-war Europe, the squadron flew home to Canada and was subsequently disbanded on 22 June 1946. They reformed at RCAF Station Dorval on 1 April 1949, moved to RCAF Station Downsview on 1 July 1956, RCAF Station Uplands in August 1964, and finally to CFB Trenton on 11 August 1971.

== Operations ==
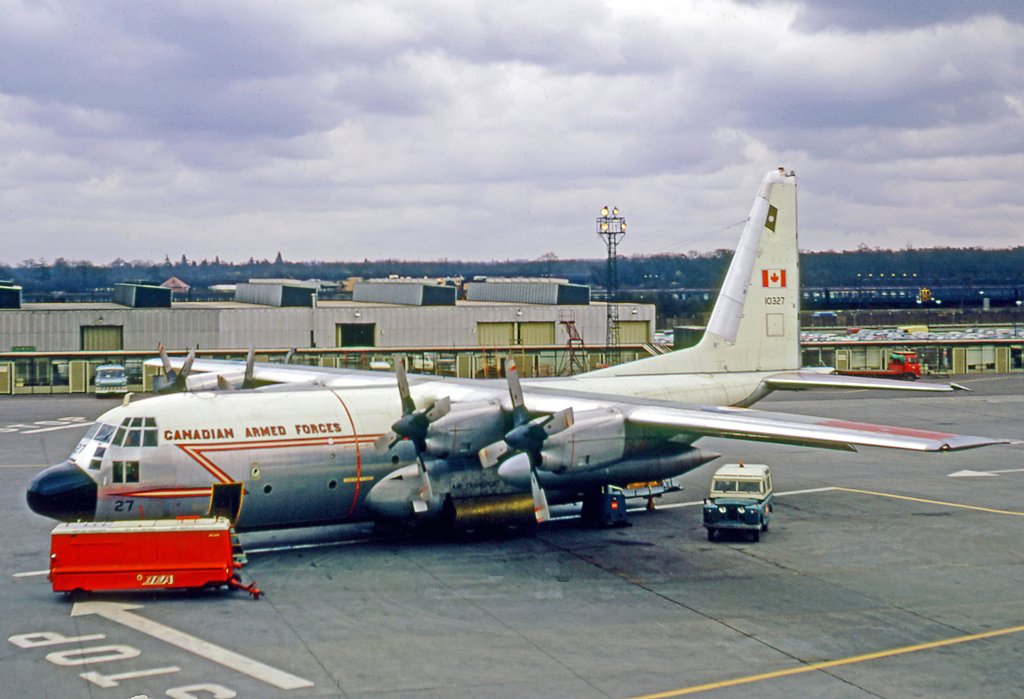
Lockheed C-130E Hercules of 436 Squadron at London Gatwick Airport in 1970.

436 Transport Squadron provides tactical and strategic airlift capabilities for the Canadian Armed Forces. Initial modern equipment was the Lockheed C-130E Hercules. These were replaced by 17 CC-130J Super Hercules aircraft which are currently operated by the squadron. Aircraft are Canadian numbered 601–617.

The unit has operated aircraft from Afghanistan, sent aircraft and personnel to support Operation MOBILE during the 2011 military intervention in Libya, and deployed CC-130J Super Hercules assets in support of Operation Impact.
