= 2017 Invictus Games =

Para sporting event in Toronto

Invictus Games – Toronto 2017
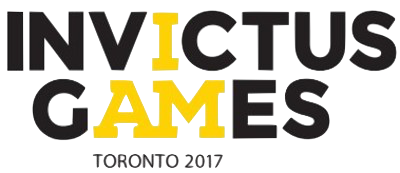
- Host city: Toronto, Canada
- Nations: 17
- Debuting countries: 2
- Opening: 23 September 2017
- Closing: 30 September 2017
- Opened by: Prince Harry
- Torch lighter: Natacha Dupuis, Simon Mailloux, David Johnston
- Main venue: Air Canada Centre
- Website: www.invictusgames2017.com

The 2017 Invictus Games was a parasport event for wounded, injured or sick armed services personnel and their associated veterans, which was held in Toronto, Ontario, Canada. The third Invictus Games, an event created in 2014 by Prince Harry, included eleven sports. It was the second Games to be held in North America, following the Invictus Games Orlando 2016.

== Development and preparation ==
The CEO of the 2017 Invictus Games was Michael Burns.

=== Torch relay ===
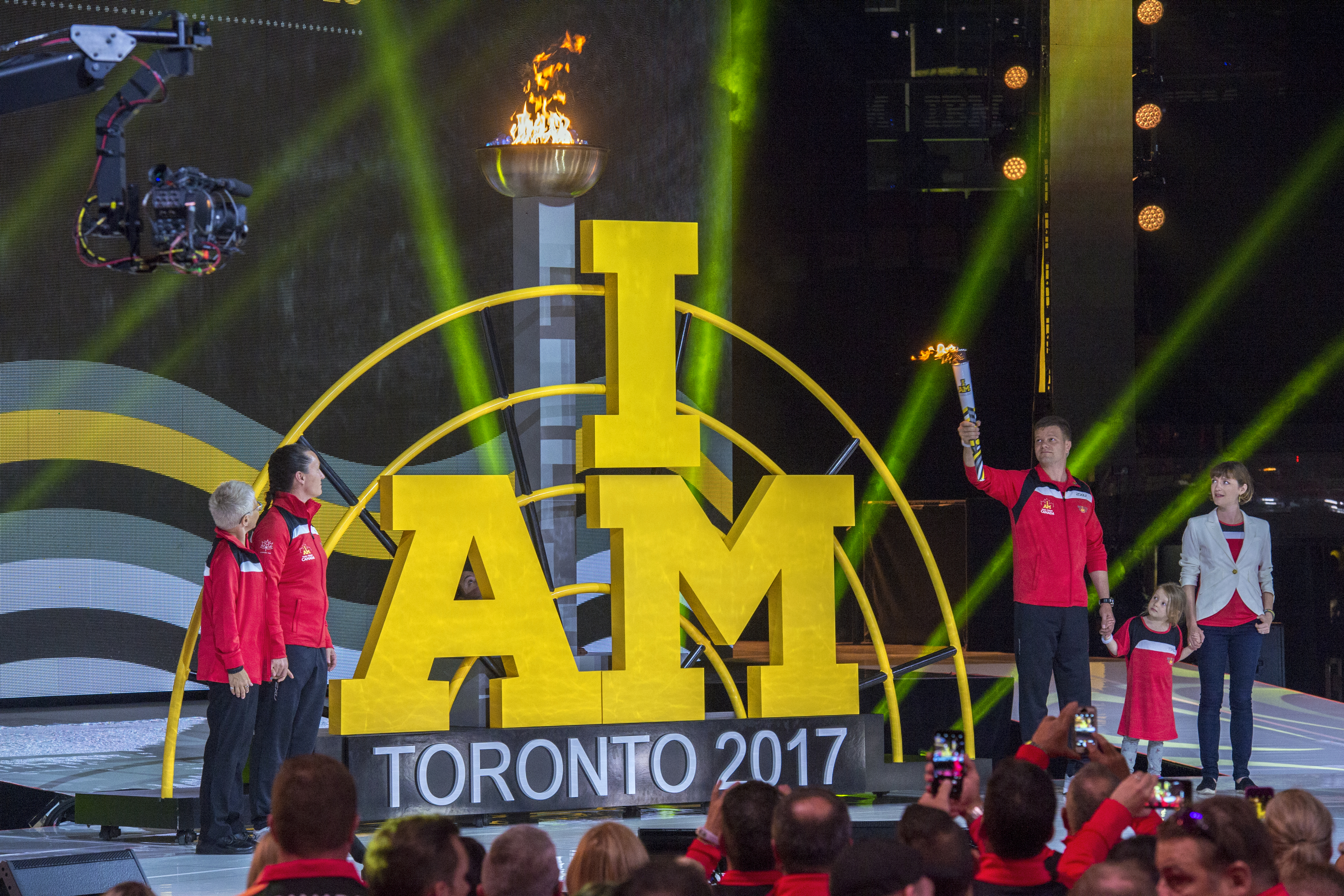
Lighting of the torch to open the 2017 Invictus Games

The relay took place between 19 August and 26 September, visiting all 32 Canadian Forces bases and neighbouring communities, being carried by over 1000 torchbearers. The route was charted as being 7000 kilometres long.

=== Venues ===
The Games used some of the facilities from Pan American and Parapan American Games in 2015, held in Toronto.

Venue	Events/Sports
Air Canada Centre	Opening and closing ceremonies
York Lions Stadium	Athletics
Fort York National Historic Site	Archery
Toronto Pan Am Sports Centre	Swimming, Sitting volleyball and wheelchair basketball
Nathan Phillips Square	Wheelchair tennis
Mattamy Athletic Centre	Indoor rowing, powerlifting, sitting volleyball, wheelchair basketball and wheelchair rugby
St. George's Golf and Country Club	Golf
High Park	Cycling
Distillery District	Driving challenge

There was no athlete's village for these games, but the downtown Sheraton Centre Toronto Hotel became an unofficial village for participants living there.

=== Funding ===
The Royal Canadian Legion was asked by organizers to be a sponsor; the 30 members of the Legion council who met voted unanimously in support. Their $500,000 donation drew criticism from Canadian Veterans Advocacy, who suggested that drawing on the Poppy Campaign donations as opposed to other revenue sources was inappropriate. The Legion and columnists defended the use of funds as supporting the mission, noting other veteran welfare projects like purchasing a specialized MRI for a mental health clinic.

=== Marketing ===
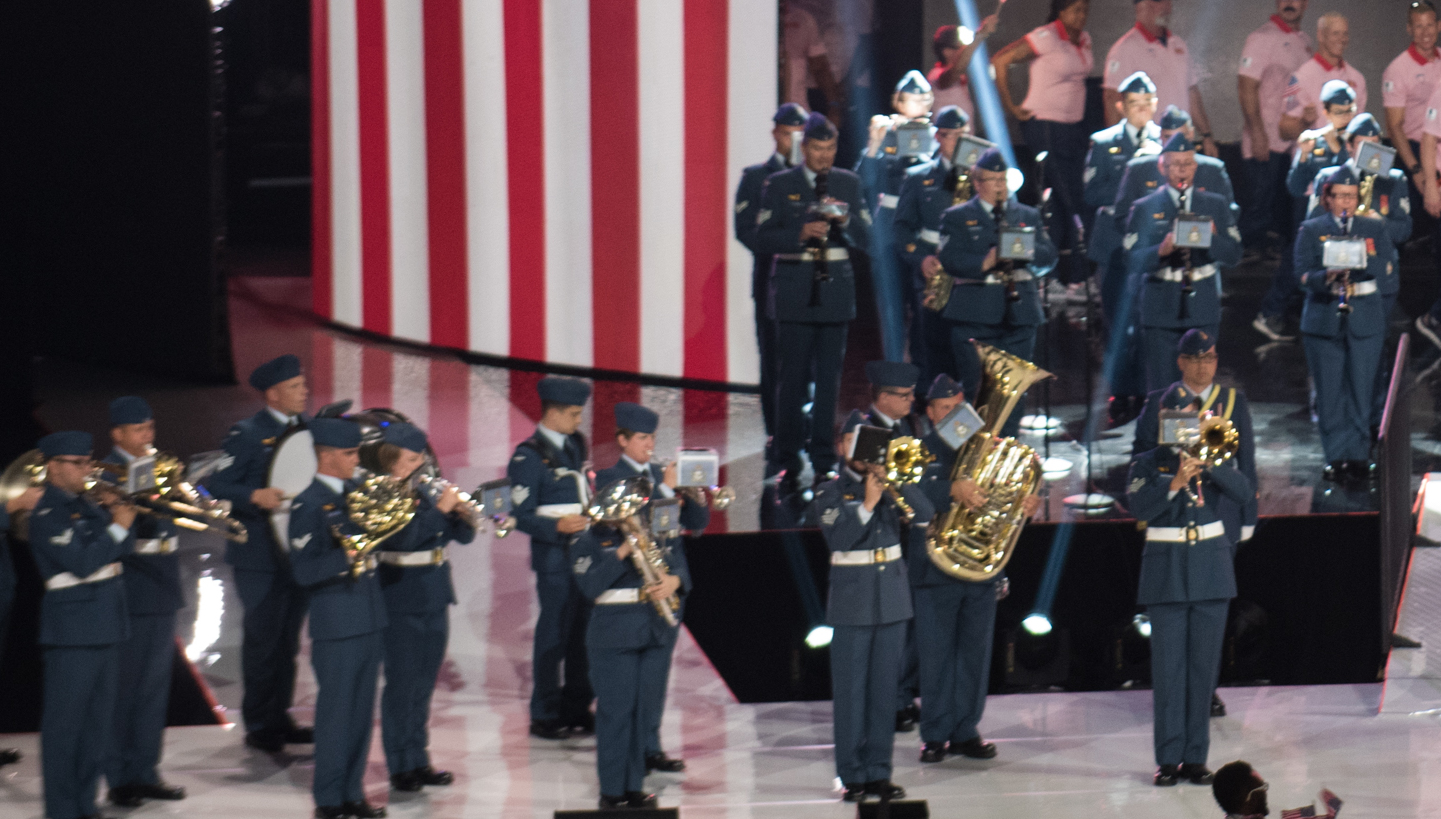
The Central Band of the Canadian Armed Forces at Air Canada Centre for the opening ceremony of the games.

A dog named Vimy was announced as the Games' mascot in April 2015. It was named for the Battle of Vimy Ridge, considered by many as a defining moment in Canadian history. A few days later, Prince Harry attended an exhibition sledge hockey game at Mattamy Athletic Centre in Toronto, alongside Prime Minister Justin Trudeau and Toronto Mayor John Tory, as part of a series of launch events at the Royal York Hotel, and with Elizabeth Dowdeswell in the office of the Lieutenant Governor of Ontario, at the Legislative Assembly of Ontario, Queen's Park.

== The Games ==
=== Participating nations ===
All 15 countries from the 2016 Games were invited again, while Romania and Ukraine made their debut.

- Afghanistan
- Australia
- Canada
- Denmark
- Estonia
- France
- Georgia
- Germany
- Iraq
- Italy
- Jordan
- Netherlands
- New Zealand
- Romania
- Ukraine
- United Kingdom
- United States

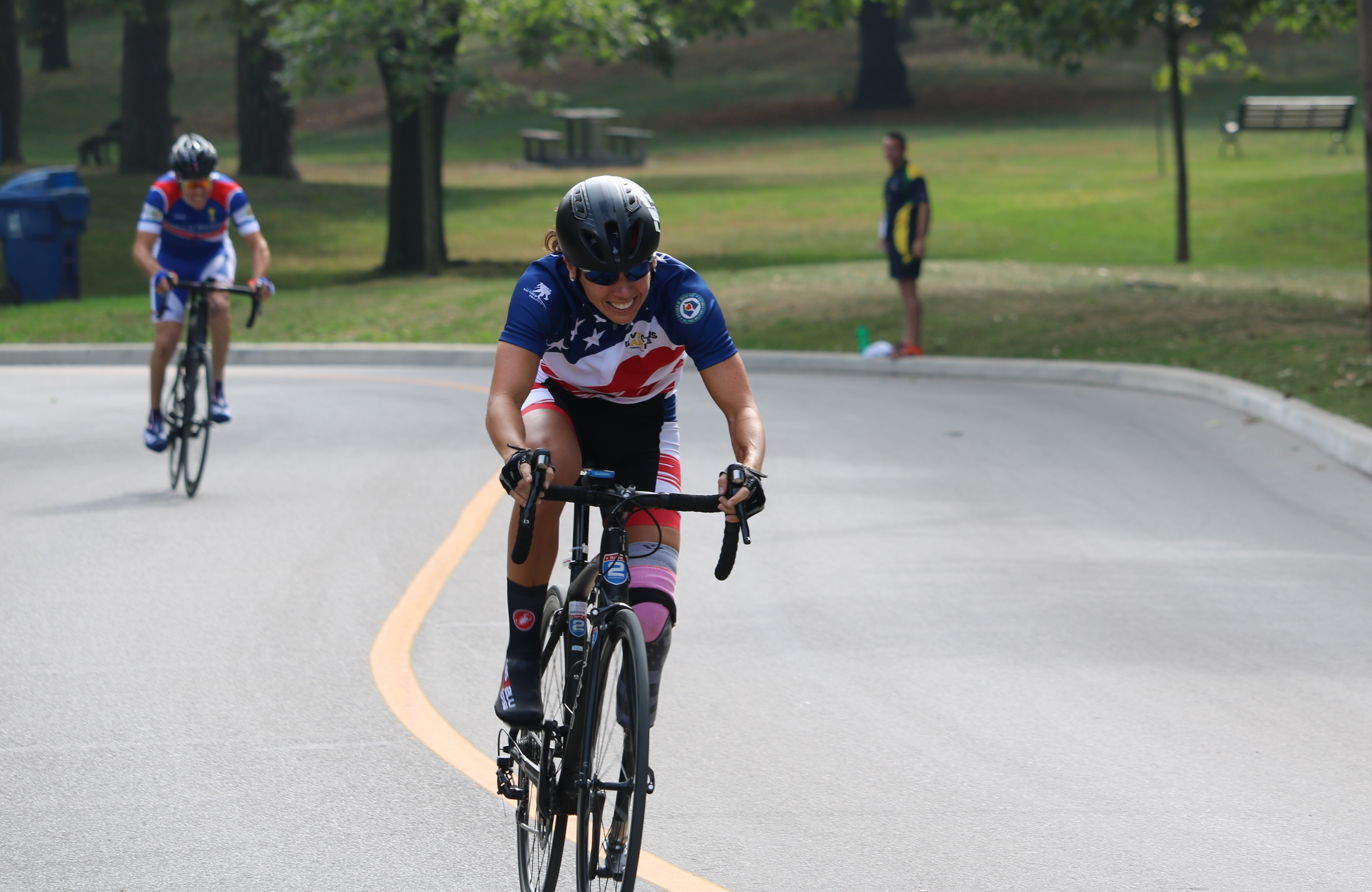
U.S. Army Capt. Kelly Elmlinger during the women’s cycling event at the 2017 Invictus Games

=== Sports ===
- Archery
- Athletics
- Golf
- Indoor rowing
- Powerlifting
- Road cycling
- Sitting volleyball
- Sledge hockey
- Swimming
- Wheelchair basketball
- Wheelchair rugby

=== Calendar ===
OC	Opening ceremony	●	Event competitions	1	Event finals	CC	Closing ceremony

September	23rd Sat	24th Sun	25th Mon	26th Tues	27th Wed	28th Thurs	29th Fri	30th Sat	Total
Ceremonies	OC							CC	
Archery					●	●	8		8
Athletics		29	32						61
Cycling				11	11				22
Driving Challenge	1								1
Golf				2					2
Indoor rowing				18					18
Powerlifting			4	2					6
Sitting volleyball				●	1				1
Swimming						●	29		29
Wheelchair basketball						●	●	1	1
Wheelchair rugby					●	1			1
Wheelchair tennis	●	●	1						1
Total gold medals	1	29	37	33	12	1	37	1	151
September	23rd Sat	24th Sun	25th Mon	26th Tues	27th Wed	28th Thurs	29th Fri	30th Sat	Total

== Medal table ==
* Host nation (Canada)

Rank	Nation	Gold	Silver	Bronze	Total
1	United States	41	38	55	134
2	United Kingdom	26	35	27	88
3	Canada*	18	17	13	48
4	Australia	16	23	13	52
5	Netherlands	14	2	8	24
6	France	11	14	11	36
7	Ukraine	8	3	3	14
8	Iraq	4	0	0	4
9	New Zealand	3	4	4	11
10	Denmark	3	0	2	5
11	Estonia	2	2	4	8
12	Italy	1	5	3	9
13	Jordan	1	3	1	5
14	Germany	1	2	1	4
15	Romania	1	1	2	4
16	Georgia	1	0	0	1
17	Afghanistan	0	1	1	2
Totals (17 entries)		151	150	148	449

== Broadcasters ==
Bell Media was announced as the exclusive broadcast partner of the Games, in a deal covering both the Orlando 2016 and Toronto 2017 events. Events were shown on TSN. The station helped run the Toronto launch ceremony in May 2016.
