= 426 Transport Training Squadron =

426 Transport Training Squadron No. 426 (Thunderbird) Squadron RCAF
- Active: 15 October 1942 – 1 January 1946; 1 August 1946 – September 1962; 3 May 1971 until present day
- Country: Canada
- Branch: (Canada) Royal Canadian Air Force
- Nickname: Thunderbirds
- Motto: On Wings of Fire
- Battle honours: English Channel and North Sea 1943, Baltic 1943, Fortress Europe 1943–44, France and Germany 1944–45, Biscay Ports 1943–44, Ruhr 1943–45, Berlin 1943–44, German Ports 1943–45, Normandy 1944, Rhine, Biscay 1943

Insignia
- Squadron Badge heraldry: A Thunderbird
- Squadron Codes: OW (Oct 1942 – Dec 1945)

Aircraft flown
- Transport: CC-130 Hercules E, H, J models

426 Transport Training Squadron is a unit of the Canadian Forces under Royal Canadian Air Force, located at CFB Trenton in Trenton, Ontario. It originated as a squadron in the Royal Canadian Air Force (RCAF) that fought during the Second World War as a bomber squadron.

The motto of the squadron is "On Wings of Fire" and the squadron's badge contains a Thunderbird. The badge refers to the squadron's Thunderbird designation.

== History ==
=== Second World War ===
No. 426 Squadron RCAF was created during the Second World War as a result of the British Commonwealth Air Training Plan to supply aircrew for the war in Europe. It first formed at RAF Dishforth, England on 15 October 1942, with Vickers Wellington Mk IIIs and Mk Xs. The squadron was used as bomber unit in No. 4 Group RAF, RAF Bomber Command. Its first operational mission occurred on the night of the 14th and 15 January 1943, when seven Wellingtons bombed Lorient. The squadron used to fly by night, principally over Germany. Unlike the other RCAF Wellington squadrons it did not go to Tunisia in that year, but remained operating over Germany. That year the squadron transferred to No. 6 Group RCAF. In June of that year it moved to RAF Linton-on-Ouse, where it re-equipped with the Bristol Hercules-engined Avro Lancaster II. With this type it soon resumed the offensive, and continued with the night campaign from Linton for the next ten months. In April 1944 it began to re-equip with Handley Page Halifax IIIs and VIIs, and for the next year continued to operate with these types as part of No. 6 Group.

During the war it flew 261 operational missions (242 bombing missions and 19 mining excursions) involving 3,213 sorties, and in doing so lost 88 aircraft. Its last operation took place on April 25, 1945, when 20 Halifaxes bombed gun batteries on island of Wangerooge. On May 25, 1945, the squadron was renamed to 426 Transport Squadron.

Possibly, the most heroic act realized by a member of the squadron during the war took place on October 20, 1943, when Flight Sergeant Stuart (the pilot) and his crew were sent to bomb Leipzig. During the mission he was engaged by enemy fighters, Messerschmitt Bf 109 and Junkers Ju 88, initially managing to shake them off but not before having his aircraft rendered almost unfit to fly, leaving it with shattered cockpits and gun turrets; holes in the fuel tanks, damaged hydraulics and no navigation instruments. Against all odds Stuart decided to continue the mission and successfully bombed his target before guiding his crippled aircraft home. He was awarded the Conspicuous Gallantry Medal.

=== Peacetime ===
The squadron was disbanded on January 1, 1946. It reformed at RCAF Station Dartmouth on August 1, 1946, as a transport squadron. They moved to RCAF Station Lachine, Quebec, in March 1947, where it began using the North Star.

On March 8, 1948, a North Star of the squadron was used to make 426 Squadron's first flight to the Arctic with a flight from Dorval, Quebec, to Lansdowne House by way of Rockliffe, Resolute, and Trout Lake. Later, in January 1949, a 426 Squadron North Star made Canada's first coast-to-coast non-stop flight.

=== Korean War ===
During the Korean War, between 1950 and 1952, the squadron transported supplies and troops to Japan in support of United Nations operations. In July 1950, a few days after the start of the war, 426 Squadron was detached to McChord Air Force Base in Washington where it came under the operational control of the Military Air Transport Service of the United States. A typical Korean Air Lift route for 426 Squadron aeroplanes was a physically and mentally demanding fifty-hour round trip flight from McChord to Japan and back with stops at Elmendorf Air Force Base (Alaska), Shemya (Aleutian Islands), Handed and Misawa Air Base (Japan).

=== Post-Korean War to present day ===
On September 1, 1959, the squadron was moved to Trenton, Ontario. It was moved to Saint-Hubert in January 1962. It was disbanded at Saint-Hubert on 1 September of that year. It reformed again as 426 Transport Training Squadron on May 3, 1971, at Uplands. The squadron moved to Trenton in August 1971 where it remains today, conducting training on the CC-130 Hercules.

The squadron has carried out many tasks since the end of Korean War, including casualty evacuations, Royal tours and other VIP transport, and United Nations air lift operations. Thunderbird has worked in many places: the Arctic, the Middle East and Europe, the Congo and Japan.

=== Aircraft ===
Equipment used	Period of service
Vickers Wellington III	October 1942 to April 1943
Vickers Wellington X	April 1943 to June 1943
Avro Lancaster II	July 1943 to May 1944
Handley Page Halifax III	April 1944 to June 1944 and December 1944 to April 1945
Handley Page Halifax VII	June 1944 to April 1945
Liberator	June 1945 to December 1945
Dakota	
North Star	
CC-106 Yukon	
CC-130 Hercules	
CC-150 Polaris	
CC-109 Cosmopolitan	
CC-115 Buffalo	
CC-117 Falcon	
CC-137 Husky	
CC-138 Twin Otter	
CC-144 Challenger	

== Battle honours ==
The squadron has been awarded a number of battle honours during its operational history:

- English Channel and North Sea 1943
- Baltic 1944–1945
- Fortress Europe 1943–1944
- France and Germany 1944–1945
- Biscay Ports 1943–1944
- Ruhr 1943–1945
- Berlin 1943–1944
- German Ports 1943–1945
- Normandy 1944
- Rhine
- Biscay 1943

== Activities related to the squadron ==
During one attack in Belgium during the Second World War, one Halifax (serial LW682) crashed near Geraardsbergen. The entire crew perished. The remains of only five airmen, four Canadians and one British were recovered by the German authorities; the corpses of three other crewmen could not be retrieved because it had crashed in the boggy ground near the Dender river. In the late 1990s a group of Canadian and Belgian volunteers recovered the remains of the three Canadian airmen and brought them to Canada. They were later interred with their crewmates in Geraardsbergen Communal Cemetery. A great deal of the recovered Halifax was smelted into ingots and have since been used for memorials, including the ceiling of the Bomber Command Memorial in London, UK. Former members of the 426 Squadron have held biennial Thunderbird veteran reunions since the end of the Second World War. In recognition of his bravery, a new building of RAF Linton-on-Ouse was named after Flight Sergeant Frederick Stuart. The place was visited by relatives of the airman, amongst them, his daughter, whom he wasn't ever able to meet because he was shot down and killed in December 1943, one month before his child's birth.

== Notes and references ==
Notes

Bibliography

- Halley, James J. The Squadrons of the Royal Air Force & Commonwealth 1918–1988. Tonbridge, Kent, UK: Air Britain (Historians) Ltd., 1988. ISBN 0-85130-164-9.
- Jefford, C.G. RAF Squadrons, a Comprehensive record of the Movement and Equipment of all RAF Squadrons and their Antecedents since 1912. Shropshire, UK: Airlife Publishing, 1988 (second edition 2001). ISBN 1-85310-053-6.
- Motiuk, Laurence. Thunderbirds at War: Diary of a Bomber Squadron. Nepean, Ontario, Canada: Larmot Associates, 1998. ISBN 0-9683431-0-4.
- Moyes, Philip J.R. Bomber Squadrons of the RAF and their Aircraft. London: Macdonald and Jane's (Publishers) Ltd., 1964 (2nd edition 1976). ISBN 0-354-01027-1.
