= Royal Canadian Air Force Band =

Canadian military music band

Royal Canadian Air Force Band La Musique de l’Aviation royale canadienne
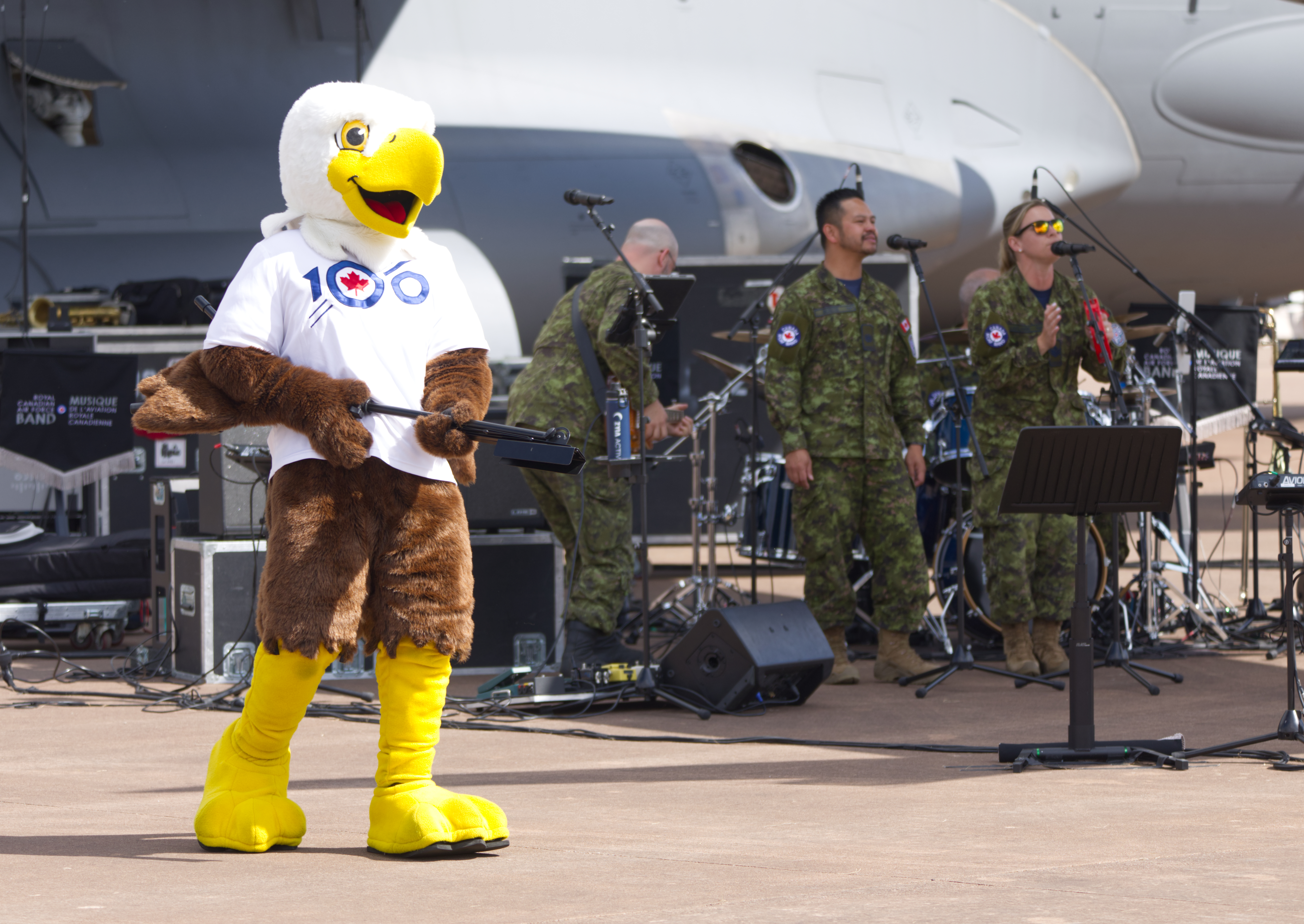
- Jet Stream of the RCAF Band.
- Active: 1947; 79 years ago
- Country: Canada
- Branch: Royal Canadian Air Force (RCAF)
- Type: Air Force Band
- Role: public duties
- Size: 35 full-time professional musicians
- Part of: 2 Canadian Air Division
- Garrison/HQ: 17 Wing, CFB Winnipeg, Manitoba
- March: RCAF March Past

Commanders
- Commanding Officer and Director of Music: Captain Devin Sloos
- Senior Warrant Officer: Master Warrant Officer Richard Monzon

The Royal Canadian Air Force Band (RCAF Band) (La Musique de l’Aviation royale canadienne) is a 35-member military band which represents the Royal Canadian Air Force in the Canadian Armed Forces. Currently located at Canadian Forces Base Winnipeg, the RCAF Band provides musical accompaniment for ceremonies of the RCAF in Canada. The band is presently under the command of Captain Devin Sloos.

== History ==
In 1946, Carl Friberg, a wartime bandmaster working as a public relations representative in Vancouver, was invited to form a professional band for the RCAF No.2 Training Command in Winnipeg. It became operational the next year and was transferred to Edmonton as the North West Air Command Band. The band's first high-profile performance was during the Earl Alexander of Tunis's (Governor General of Canada from 1946–1952) tour of western Canada in 1948. In 1955, the band became the Tactical Air Command Band which coincided with an increase in musicians, going from 35 to 55. The band was transferred back to Winnipeg in 1964 and was combined with the Royal Canadian Horse Artillery Band in 1968.

The other members of the band became part of the newly formed Canadian Forces Air Transport Command Band and was transferred to the Canadian Forces Air Command in 1975, with its headquarters in Winnipeg and was renamed the Air Command Band. During the reformation of the Music Branch in 1994, the band was expanded from 35 to 45 members. The band changed its name again in 1997 to the Band of 1 Canadian Air Division when that particular unit was formed. Unlike its predecessors, this was a downgrade as decreased in the number of musicians. Another name change came in 2000 when it was changed back to "Air Command Band".

In 2009, a major reorganization of the band occurred. An increase of demand prompted its leadership to create new subdivisions such as Jet Stream, Command Brass (brass quintet) and an eight member pipes and drums (not to be confused with the RCAF Pipes and Drums).

In 2011, with the restoration of royal military prefixes, the band was renamed the Royal Canadian Air Force Band.

2016 saw the dissolution of the pipes and drums and a reinstitution of the brass and reed band instrumentation, while still maintaining contemporary musical capabilities including vocals, guitar and piano. In July 2018, the band served as the musical support in the changing of the Queen's Guard at Buckingham Palace in London with a contingent of RCAF personnel from across Canada for the first time in the RCAF's history. The band also took part in the 75th anniversary of the D-Day landings in Normandy in June 2019. Once again, in June 2024, the RCAF Band travelled to Normandy and took part in ceremonies commemorating the 80th anniversary of the D-Day landings.

== Ensembles ==
- Wind Ensemble
- Jet Stream
- Jetliners
- RCAF Rock Band
- Large Brass Ensemble
- Dixieland Band
- Command Brass
- Clarinet Quartet
- Jazz Combos
- Fixed Wing

== Directors ==
- WO Carl Friberg (Bandmaster 1946–1951)
- Lieutenant Colonel Clifford Hunt (Director of Music 1946–?)
- Flight Lieutenant Leo Corcoran (1951–1955)
- Flight Lieutenant Carl Friberg (1955–1961)
- Flying Officer Ted Robbins (1961–1968)
- Flight Lieutenant Howard Woods (1968–1969)
- Captain Albert "Conn" Furey (1969–1970)
- Captain Terence Barnes (1971–1974)
- Captain Keith Swanwick (1975–1983)
- Captain David Jones (1983–1986)
- Captain John French (1987–1990)
- Captain Terry O'Connor (1990–1993)
- Major JGG Bouchard (1993–1997)
- Captain Alain Pineault (1997–2001)
- Captain Scott Attridge (2001–2003)
- Captain Ray Murray (2003–2006)
- Captain Peter Archibald (2006–2007)
- Captain John Fullerton (2010–2016)
- Captain Matthew Clark (2016–2021)
- Captain Chris Embree (2021–2022)
- Captain Devin Sloos (2022–present)

== Notable members ==
- Lieutenant Colonel Clifford Hunt – Commandant of the Canadian Forces School of Music from 1966 to 1968.
- Kenneth Killingbeck – Director of the Royal Canadian Regiment Band in the late 1980s and early 1990s.
- Ernest R. Dalwood – A British-Canadian musician who formerly was part of the BBC Symphony Orchestra and the Band of the Coldstream Guards.

== See also ==
- Canadian military bands
- Royal Air Force March Past
