= Air Operations Branch =

- Branche des opérations aériennes
- Branch badge
- Country: Canada
- Branch: Canadian Armed Forces
- Type: Personnel branch
- Role: Military aviation
- Motto: Per ardua ad astra (Latin for 'through adversity to the stars')
- March: "RCAF March Past"

The Air Operations Branch (French: Branche des opérations aériennes) is a personnel branch of the Canadian Forces (CF). All members of the branch wear the air force uniform.

== Training ==
=== Royal Canadian Air Force Academy ===
The Royal Canadian Air Force Academy (RCAF Academy) at CFB Borden provides leadership and management training and imparts leadership and management techniques. The role of the RCAF Academy is to broaden awareness of Royal Canadian Air Force heritage and to develop general service knowledge and professional attributes. The school offers the Basic Air Environmental Qualification (BAEQ), Primary Leadership Qualification (PLQ), Primary Air Environmental Qualification (PAEQ), Intermediate Air Environmental Qualification (IAEQ), and Senior Air Supervisor (SAS) courses. The RCAF Academy is also responsible for the design (AEQ) Courses.

=== Canadian Forces School of Aerospace Control Operations ===
The Canadian Forces School of Aerospace Control Operations (CFSACO) in Cornwall, Ontario, offers a range of basic and specialty courses and conversion training to aerospace control officers and aerospace control operators. The CFSACO mainly carries out training in military air traffic control, and air defence. Military members are trained to become either air traffic controller/operators or air weapons controller/operators.

=== Canadian Forces School of Aerospace Technology and Engineering ===
The Canadian Forces School of Aerospace Technology and Engineering (CFSATE) at CFB Borden was formed in 1985 when the Canadian Forces School of Aerospace and Ordnance Engineering (CFSAOE), having previously amalgamated the Canadian Forces Aircraft Trade School (CFATS) and the Royal Canadian Electrical and Mechanical Engineers School (RCEME School), was dissolved. CFSATE delivers training to both aerospace engineering officers and military occupation classification (MOC) 500 technicians for both Regular and Reserve Force. The school conducts apprentice-level training for various trades, including avionics systems (AVS), aviation systems (AVN), aircraft structures (ACS), air weapons systems (AWS), and imagery (IMAGE) technicians.

=== RCAF W/C William G. Barker VC Aerospace College ===
The RCAF W/C William G. Barker VC Aerospace College (RCAF Barker College) in Winnipeg, Manitoba, was stood up in 2018 to replace the Canadian Forces School of Aerospace Studies (CFSAS), established in 1987. RCAF Barker College offers advanced education and training to some 2000 officers and non-commissioned members annually. RCAF Barker College teaches the Aerospace Studies Programme (ASP), the Operational Test and Evaluation (OT&E) course, Advanced Electronic Warfare, Basic Space Operations and Space Operations, Human Performance in Military Aviation (HPMA), the Instrument Check Pilot (ICP), the Modelling and Simulation course, the five-part Air Force Officer Development (AFOD) program, and the RCAF Unit Command Team Orientation Programme. The RCAF Barker College is home to the LGen Lewis Memorial Library which specializes in subjects related to aerospace warfare and technology.

=== 1 Canadian Forces Flying Training School ===
Formerly called Canadian Forces Air Navigation School, the 1 Canadian Forces Flying Training School (1 CFFTS) at CFB Winnipeg selects, develops, and trains commissioned air combat systems officer and non-commissioned airborne electronic sensor operators, who use modern aircraft positioning systems, such as GPSs to direct complex tactical missions.

=== 2 Canadian Forces Flying Training School ===
The 2 Canadian Forces Flying Training School (2 CFFTS), at CFB Moose Jaw trains over 150 pilots every year through the NATO Flying Training in Canada (NFTC) program for Canada's Air Force.

=== 3 Canadian Forces Flying Training School ===
The 3 Canadian Forces Flying Training School (3 CFFTS) in Winnipeg conducts pilot training using a variety of aircraft to accomplish its mission. 3 CFFTS is responsible for the oversight of the primary pilot selection and training of all air force pilots. 3 CFFTS conducts the visual flight rules flight training for all air force air combat systems officers. In addition, 3 CFFTS conducts helicopter pilot training and multi-engine aircraft pilot training.

== Order of precedence ==
Preceded by Royal Canadian Infantry Corps	Air Operations Branch	Succeeded by Royal Canadian Logistics Service
