= Colin Keiver =

Royal Canadian Air Force major general

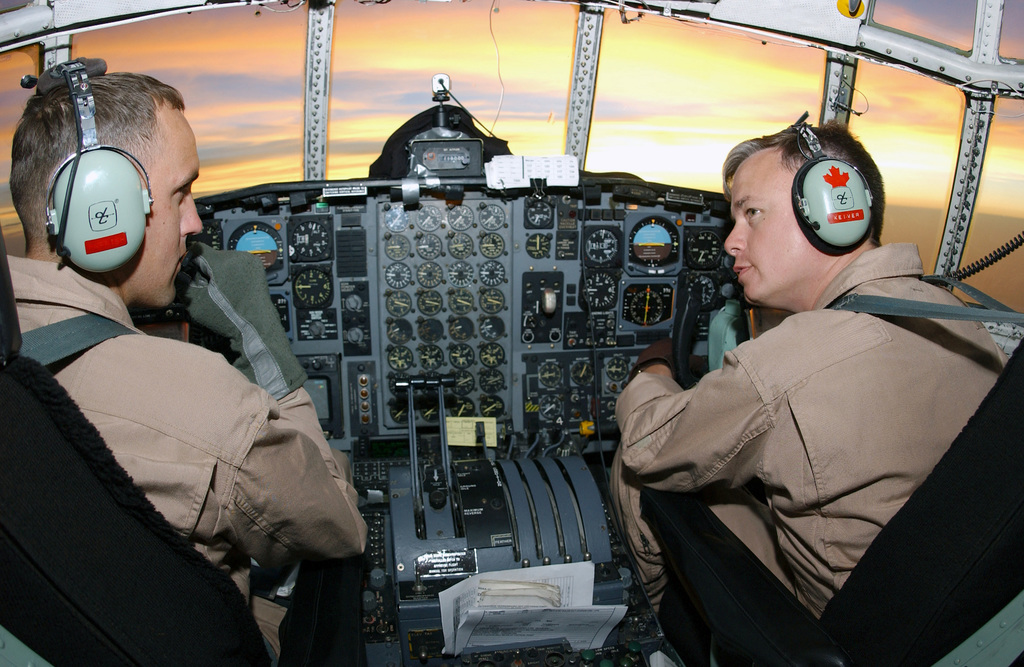
- Keiver (right) in the cockpit of a USMC KC-130 above Afghanistan during Operation Enduring Freedom (2002).
- Born: Colin Keiver; Three Hills, Alberta
- Allegiance: Canada
- Branch: Royal Canadian Air Force (Note: Known as Air Command until 2011)
- Service years: 1991 - 2023
- Rank: Major General
- Commands: Commander of Joint Task Force-Iraq; Commander of 8 Wing Trenton; Commander of 436 Transport Squadron
- Conflicts: War in Afghanistan; Second Sudanese Civil War; International military intervention against ISIL
- Awards: Canadian Meritorious Service Medal; Canadian Forces' Decoration

Colin Keiver MSM, CD is a retired Royal Canadian Air Force major general who was the deputy commander of the Royal Canadian Air Force from May 2021 until July 2023.

== Early life and education ==
Keiver was born and raised on a farm outside of Three Hills, Alberta. From a young age, he had a keen interest in aviation where he received his glider pilot licence through air cadets at the age of 16 in Gimli, Manitoba. He holds a Bachelor of Arts degree in political science from the University of Manitoba, a master's degree in defence studies from the Royal Military College of Canada and is a graduate of the Royal College of Defence Studies in London, UK.

== Military career ==
Born in Three Hills, Alberta, Keiver joined the Canadian Armed Forces in 1991 and served with the Calgary Highlanders. Progressing from primary flying training on the Beechcraft CT-134 Musketeer at CFB Portage la Prairie to completing basic flying training on the Canadair CT-114 Tutor at CFB Moose Jaw, he went on to multi-engine training returning to CFB Portage la Prairie where he trained on the Beechcraft King Air before transitioning to flying the CC-130 in 435 Transport and Rescue Squadron in 1994. In 2001, he had been sent on exchange with the United States Marine Corps to fly KC-130's in VMGR-252 as the Director of Safety and Standardization. In February 2002, while on exchange with the United States Marine Corps, he had been deployed to Afghanistan for 3 months to play a part in Operation Enduring Freedom.

In 2004, Keiver returned to Canada to Winnipeg, Manitoba, as A3 Transport Operations at 1 Canadian Air Division Headquarters. During his time at the 1 Canadian Air Division Headquarters, he was deployed to Sudan as the Air Operations Advisor for the African Union Mission in Sudan from late November 2005, to late May 2006. Upon his return to 1 Canadian Air Division Headquarters as A3 Transport where he had played a vital role in introducing both the CC-177 and the CC-130J to service.

In 2009, he attended the Canadian Forces College in Toronto, Ontario, where he obtained a master's degree in defence studies. Transitioning from the Canadian Forces College to flying the CC-130J in 436 Transport Squadron when it was delivered in June 2010 as the squadron commander, Keiver has had lots of experience in command roles at CFB Trenton from being the 27th commander of 436 Squadron to becoming the 49th Wing Commander of 8 Wing Trenton in the summer of 2015 until the summer of 2017. Throughout his time between being the commander of 436 Transport Squadron and the commander of 8 Wing Trenton, he had been in Ottawa as the Director Air Simulation and Training and had attended the Royal College of Defence Studies in London, United Kingdom. After finishing his time in Trenton, he was appointed Director Defence Program Coordination in the National Defence Headquarters of Canada for a year. He was appointed the commander of JTF-I in the summer of 2018. As of July 2019, he has been the Director General of Air and Space Force Development. In April, 2021, he was promoted to the rank of major general to be appointed the deputy commander of the Royal Canadian Air Force, which he would hold command of up until his retirement in July 2023.

== Honours and decorations ==
Keiver has earned the following decorations throughout his military career.

Honours and decorations
Decoration	Description	Notes
	Royal Canadian Air Force Pilot Wings	Awarded in May 1994 upon completion of training in the Beechcraft King Air C90A at CFB Portage la Prairie.
	Canadian Meritorious Service Medal with a clasp	Awarded on June 18, 2007, by, at the time, Governor General Michaëlle Jean for his contributions as Air Operations Advisor for Task Force Addis Ababa, in Khartoum, Sudan.; Awarded bar on August 14, 2020, by Governor General Mary Simon for his service as commander of JTF-I.
	South-West Asia Service Medal with an Afghanistan clasp	Awarded after Keiver's time having assisted in Afghanistan in 2002 when he had been deployed for 90 days by the United States Marine Corps.
	General Service Medal	Awarded after time as the commander of JTF-I in Iraq in 2018.
	Sudan Operational Service Medal	Awarded in 2008 after a previous deployment as the Air Operations Advisor for Task Force Addis Ababa, in Khartoum, Sudan, from November 28, 2005, to May 25, 2006.
	Canadian Peacekeeping Service Medal	Awarded after his deployment to Sudan recognizing Canadian Peacekeepers deployed outside Canada for a minimum of 30 days which Keiver had completed.
	NATO Medal for the Former Yugoslavia	Awarded for contributing 30 cumulative days in Former Yugoslavia as a NATO military service member.
	Canadian Forces' Decoration with a clasp	Awarded to Keiver in 2003 after having served 12 years in the Canadian Armed Forces (1991–2003).; Awarded a clasp after 10 years of subsequent service.
	Meritorious Service Medal	Awarded while on exchange with the United States Marine Corps in VMGR-252.

== Timeline of ranks ==
Promotions
Insignia	Rank	Date
	Officer Cadet	In January 1991, Keiver had joined the Canadian Armed Forces as a pilot and trained on multiple different aircraft throughout his time at 3 Canadian Forces Flying Training School (CFFTS) and 2 CFFTS. In January 1992, he had started flying in the Beechcraft CT-134 Musketeer. After primary flying training, he had transitioned to CFB Moose Jaw to train on the Canadair CT-114 Tutor.
	Second lieutenant	As a second lieutenant, Keiver completed his multi-engine training in the Beechcraft King Air at CFB Portage la Prairie.
	Lieutenant	While a Lieutenant, Keiver had been flying in the CC-130 with 435 Transport and Rescue Squadron in Winnipeg, Manitoba, completing time in the Hercules as well as expanding experience in military air transport and air-to-air refuelling.
	Captain	While a captain, Keiver had originally been flying CC-130's with 435 Transport and Rescue Squadron before going on exchange with the United States Marine Corps to fly with VMGR 252.
	Major	As a Major, Keiver had been on exchange with the United States Marine Corps as the Director of Safety and Standardization from 2001 to 2004. After returning from MCAS Cherry Point, he had returned to 1 Canadian Air Division Headquarters in Winnipeg, Manitoba, to be in charge of A3 Transport. He had been involved in the RCAF transition to the CC-177 and CC-130J.
	Lieutenant colonel	As a lieutenant colonel, Keiver had been the commanding officer of 436 Transport Squadron at CFB Trenton from 2010 to 2012. Keiver was the commander of the Squadron during the delivery of the CC-130J's to the RCAF. This was also a period of significant operational activity in Afghanistan and Libya.
	Colonel	Upon being promoted to colonel, Keiver was appointed director of air simulation and training in Ottawa, where he was responsible for all contracted training within the RCAF as well as the development of the RCAF Simulation Strategy. From 2014 to 2015, he had completed a fellowship at the Royal College of Defence Studies in London, UK. He was the wing commander of 8 Wing Trenton from 2015 to 2017. In 2018, he was appointed as the director of defence program coordination at National Defence Headquarters.
	Brigadier general	Promoted to the rank of brigadier general in April, 2018, he assumed command of JTF-I until May 2019. From June 2019 until May 2021, Keiver was the director general of Air and Space Force Development.
	Major general	Promoted to the rank of major general in April, 2021, he became the deputy commander of the Royal Canadian Air Force in May, 2021, until July, 2023.

== Notes ==
Military offices
Preceded by Blaise Frawley	Deputy Commander of the Royal Canadian Air Force; May 2021 – July 2023	Succeeded by Jamie Speiser-Blanchet
Preceded by Michel Lalumiere	Director General of Air and Space Force Development; 22 June 2018 – May 2021	Succeeded by Chris McKenna
Preceded by Andrew Jayne	Commander of Joint Task Force-Iraq (Operation Impact); 22 June 2018 – 2 May 2019	Succeeded by Michel-Henri St-Louis
Preceded by David Lowthian	Commander of 8 Wing Trenton; August 2015 – July 2017	Succeeded by Mark Goulden
Preceded by Frank Martineau	Commander of 436 Transport Squadron; 29 July 2010 – July 2012	Succeeded by Mark Goulden
