= NFTC =

NTFC may refer to:

- National Foreign Trade Council
- NATO Flying Training in Canada
