= CFB Winnipeg =

Royal Canadian Air Force base in Winnipeg, Manitoba

CFB Winnipeg 17 Wing Winnipeg

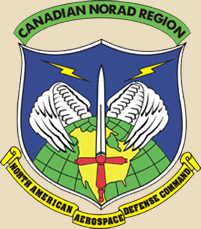
- Canadian NORAD Region emblem
- IATA: YWG; ICAO: CYWG; WMO: 71852

Summary
- Airport type: Military/Public
- Owner: Government of Canada
- Operator: DND
- Location: Winnipeg, Manitoba
- Built: 1925
- Elevation AMSL: 783 ft (239 m)
- Coordinates: 49°54′36″N 097°14′24″W

Map
- Location in Manitoba

Runways
Direction	Length		Surface
Direction	ft	m	Surface
13/31	8,701	2,652	Asphalt
18/36	11,000	3,353	Asphalt
- Source: Canada Flight Supplement; Environment Canada

Canadian Forces Base Winnipeg (CFB Winnipeg; IATA: YWG, ICAO: CYWG) is a Royal Canadian Air Force base located within the City of Winnipeg, Manitoba. Co-located at Winnipeg James Armstrong Richardson International Airport, CFB Winnipeg is home to many flight operations support divisions, as well as several training schools. Its primary RCAF lodger unit is 17 Wing, commonly referred to as 17 Wing Winnipeg.

One of the facilities at CFB Winnipeg is the Billy Bishop Building which houses the headquarters of 1 Canadian Air Division (1 CAD) as well as the headquarters of Canadian North American Aerospace Defense Command (NORAD) Region.

== History ==
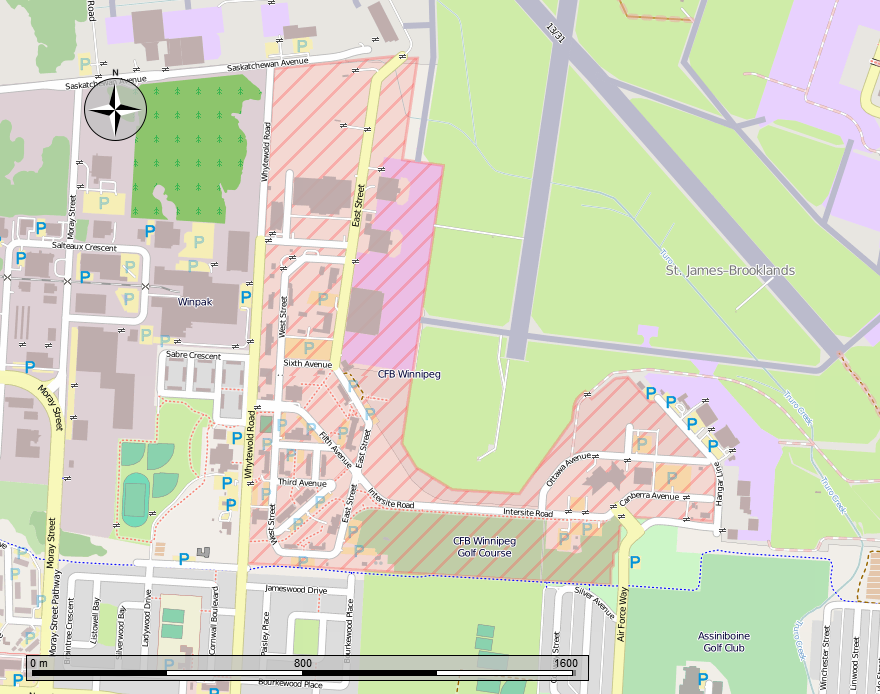
Map of the base. To the north are the runways at Winnipeg International Airport.

Established in 1922 by the federal government's Canadian Air Board (a two squadron Canadian Air Force formed in 1918 was disbanded in 1920), Winnipeg was opened as an aerodrome and became known as No 1 (Operations) Wing, Winnipeg on 1 April 1925 after the Royal Canadian Air Force was formed the previous year from the second Canadian Air Force.

Initially, the base served as a winter home for units that operated across northern Manitoba. During World War II, the base played an expanded role, participating in the British Commonwealth Air Training Plan (BCATP). During that time, they trained more than 130,000 personnel from across Canada ranging from pilots, navigators, observers and wireless operators. RCAF Station Winnipeg also became an important supply and repair depot and base to ferry and inspect units for the air force.

Following the war, RCAF Station Winnipeg continued to provide training for pilots and navigators from many allied countries, as well as base active RCAF squadrons. The formation of No.2 Air Observer School & Central Navigation School was created from the increased training activities which graduated over 5,000 aircrew from foreign countries.

The air force has long had a reserve or auxiliary presence there: No. 112 Squadron from 1932 to 1940 and then, since 1946, No. 402 Squadron. This latter unit has used, successively, the P-51D Mustang, Harvard Trainer, de Havilland Vampire, Canadair CT-133 Silver Star, Beech C-45 Expeditor, de Havilland Otter and were the last Canadian squadron to fly the CC-129 Dakota.

The February 1, 1968 unification of the RCAF with the Royal Canadian Navy and Canadian Army formed the Canadian Forces. As a result, RCAF Station Winnipeg was renamed as Canadian Forces Base Winnipeg (North).

The Canadian Army camp Fort Osborne Barracks, later renamed Kapyong Barracks, home of the 2nd Battalion, Princess Patricia's Canadian Light Infantry (PPCLI), was merged with the RCAF base, becoming Canadian Forces Base Winnipeg (South). Kapyong Barracks closed in June 2004 and 2PPCLI re-located to CFB Shilo near Brandon. The Kapyong Barracks name was also transferred to the new garrison facility in CFB Shilo.

CFB Winnipeg became home to several transport and utility squadrons, as well as headquarters for Air Command, which was formed in 1975. A realignment of the Canadian Forces in the mid-1990s saw Air Command HQ move to National Defence Headquarters. As with other AIRCOM bases across Canada, CFB Winnipeg's squadrons were grouped under a wing system, in this case 17 Wing Winnipeg, which is the highest-level unit at the base.

As a RCAF training centre, CFB Winnipeg is currently home to 3 Canadian Forces Flying Training School (although the unit itself is located in Portage la Prairie, west of Winnipeg), 402 Squadron (which conducts training done by the former Canadian Forces Air Navigation School or CFANS), the Canadian Forces School of Aerospace Studies (CFSAS), the Canadian Forces School of Survival and Aeromedical Training (CFSSAT), as well as the Canadian Forces School of Meteorology (CFS Met).

== Current usage ==
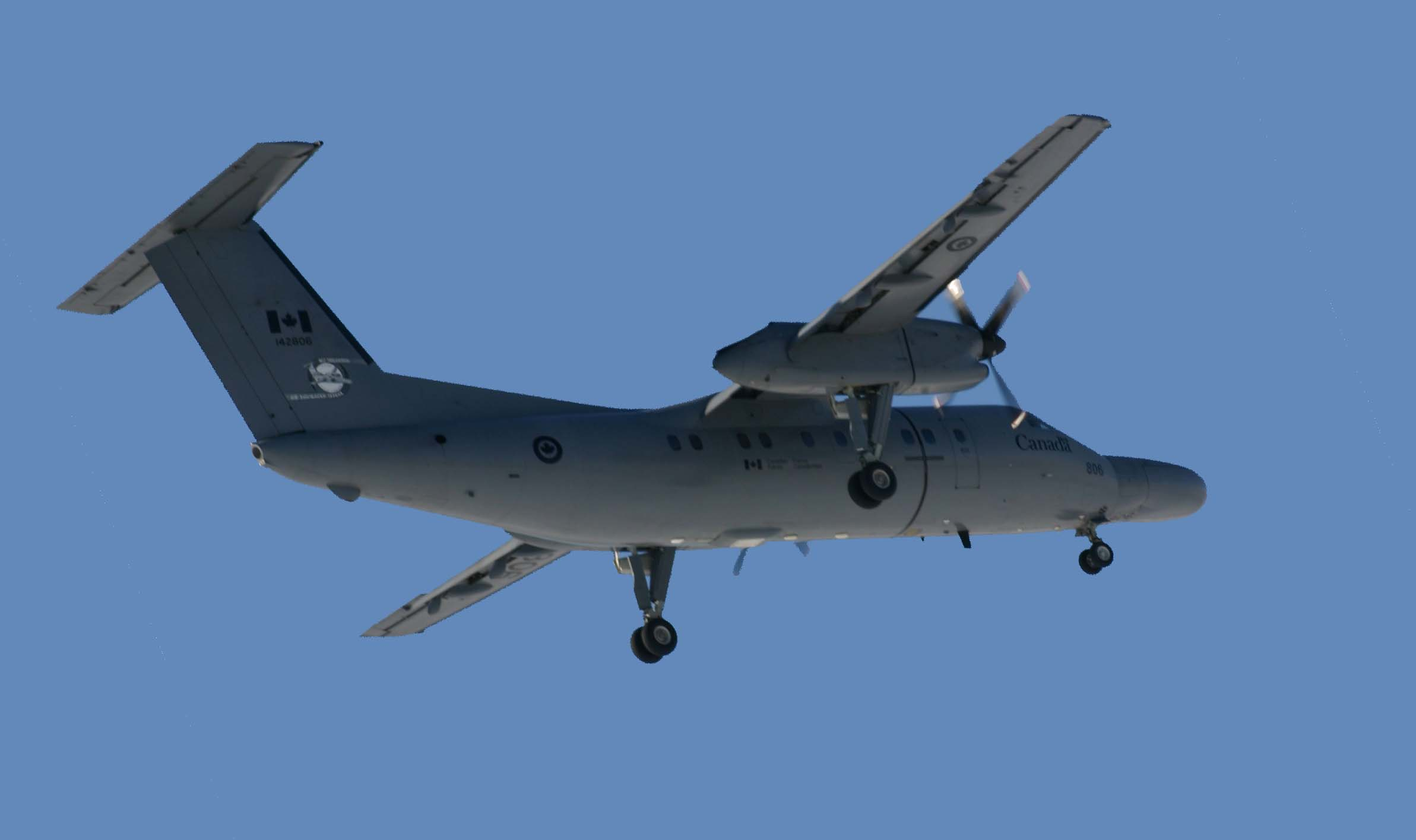
CT-142 Dash-8 "Gonzo" of 402 Squadron

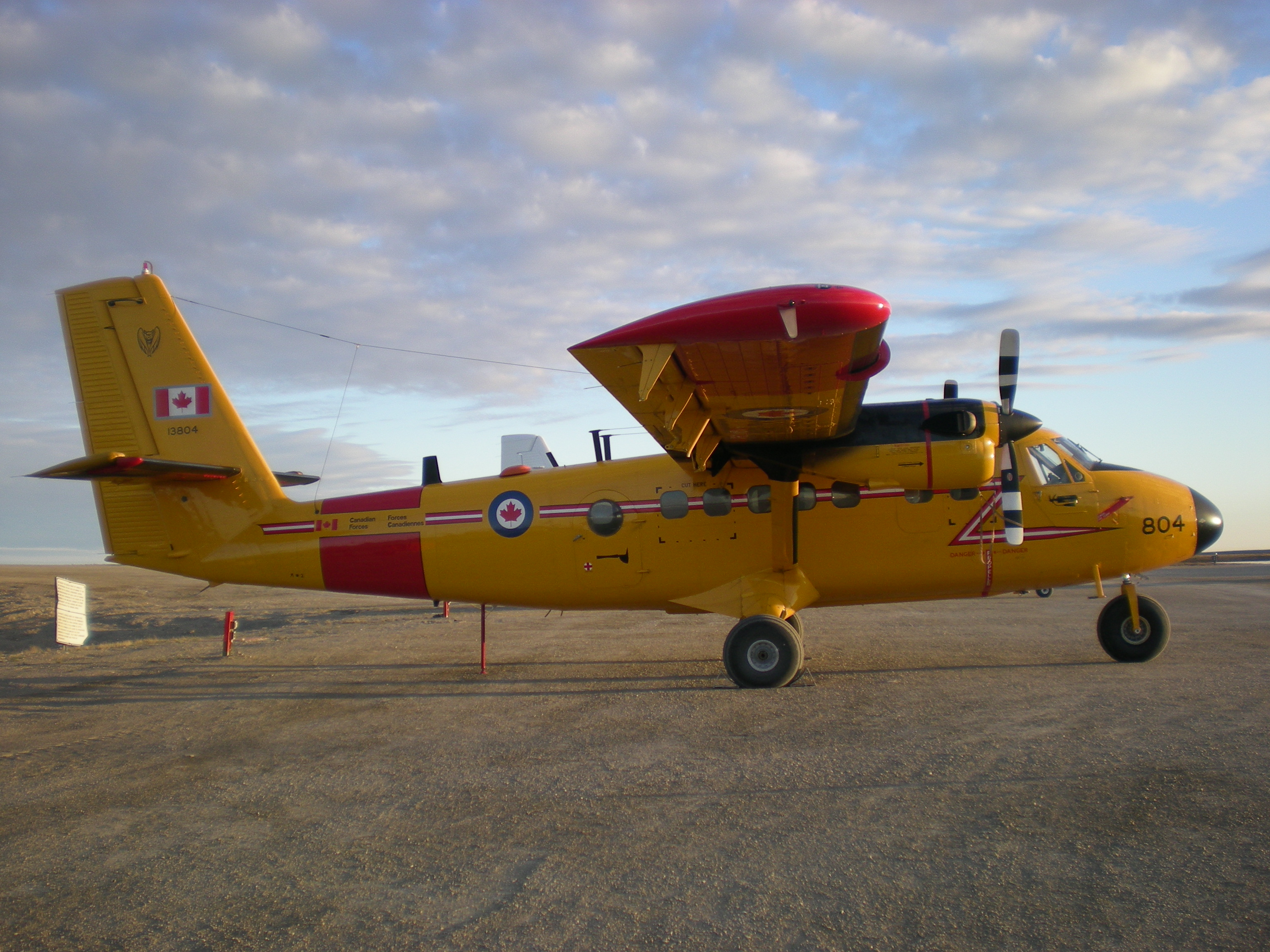
CC-138 Twin Otter of 440 Squadron

For flight operations support, the base houses the following units:

- 402 "City of Winnipeg" Squadron, (4) de Havilland CT-142 Dash 8
- 435 "Chinthe" Transport and Rescue Squadron
- Canadian Forces School of Survival and Aeromedical Training

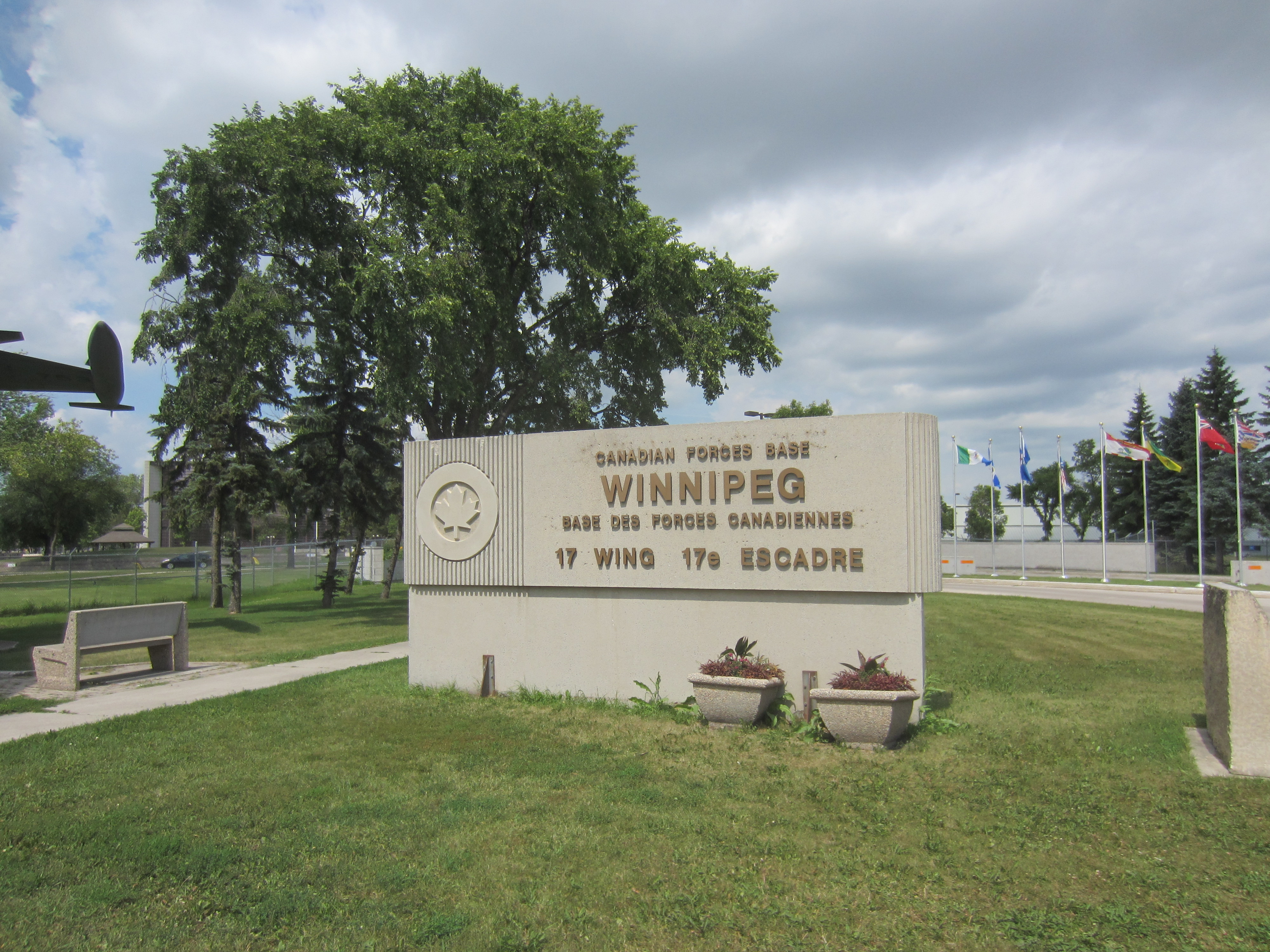
Sign at the entry to CFB Winnipeg, where 17 Wing, Royal Canadian Air Force, is currently based.

== Museum ==
The base is home to the Air Force Heritage Museum and Air Park. The Air Park is located on Air Force Way and contains 10 historic aircraft. The museum is located in the 1 Canadian Air Division Headquarters.

Outside on static display are:

- Avro Canada CF-100 Canuck 100784
- Beechcraft CT-134 Musketeer 134228
- Bell CH-136 Kiowa 136248
- Canadair CF-5A 116749
- Canadair CX-144 Challenger 144612
- Canadair CL-13B Sabre 23605
- Canadair CT-133 Silver Star 133186
- Grumman CP-121 Tracker 1551
- Canadair CF-104 Starfighter 104753
- McDonnell CF-101 Voodoo 101008
- North American Harvard (Canada Car and Foundry Mk IV) 20301

Inside the base, on static display are:

- North American B-25 Mitchell 5203
- Douglas Dakota Mk. 4SC 12949
- Beechcraft D18S Expeditor 1528

On loan to the Royal Aviation Museum of Western Canada

- Canadair CT-114 Tutor 114004
- de Havilland Canada CC-115 Buffalo 115462
