= 3 FTS =

3 FTS may refer to:

- 3 Canadian Forces Flying Training School
- No. 3 Flying Training School RAF
