= 1 Canadian Forces Flying Training School =

Canadian military pilot flying school

Coordinates: 49°53′20″N 097°14′05″W

While the lineage of 1 Canadian Forces Flying Training School (1 CFFTS; French: 1^{re} École de pilotage des Forces canadiennes) can be traced back through previous similarly named Canadian military pilot flying schools, such as No. 1 Service Flying Training School and 1 Flying Training School, the unit located at CFB Winnipeg and currently bearing the name does not participate in pilot training.

== History of advanced pilot training in the RCAF/CAF ==
Although military pilot training in Canada dates back to the early years of the 20th century, the modern Royal Canadian Air Force (RCAF) pilot training organization got its start in the British Commonwealth Air Training Plan (BCATP) with the formation of service flying training schools one of which, No. 1 Service Flying Training School (No. 1 SFTS) at Camp Borden, Ontario, specialized in advanced pilot training and eventually evolved into 1 Canadian Forces Flying Training School in 1965. Under this system pilot candidates could expect to advance from 3 CFFTS to 2 CFFTS, then finish at 1 CFFTS, mimicking the Royal Air Force pilot training philosophy adopted by the RCAF of three separate stages of pilot training – elementary, intermediate and advanced.

1 Flying Training School (FTS) was formed on 16 September 1945 at Centralia, Ontario, as a pilot training school which, on July 11, 1952, started training pilots using the de Havilland Chipmunk aircraft. The school trained RCAF and North Atlantic Treaty Organization (NATO) pilots until the school disbanded on March 6, 1957.

1 FTS was reactivated on 31 August 1965. On 23 July 1970 it combined with the Flight Instructor School (FIS) to become 1 Canadian Forces Flying Training School (1 CFFTS) with the role of advanced pilot training. On 9 November 1970, 1 CFFTS flying instructors converted to the CF-5 tactical fighter trainer and on July 22 1 CFFTS moved to Cold Lake, Alberta. Advanced pilot training became a post-wings course, and on 10 September 1977 1 CFFTS was renamed 419 Tactical Fighter Training Squadron.

== Advanced pilot training today ==
419 (Tactical) Fighter Training Squadron is carrying on 1 CFFTS's historic role of advanced pilot training for future fighter pilots.

== Current use of the name 1 CFFTS ==
On 26 June 2009, the Canadian Forces Air Navigation School adopted the name of 1 CFFTS. 1 CFFTS currently trains air combat systems officers (previously called navigators) and airborne electronic sensor operators. In the past, other aircrew trades used No. 1 in their school names, but these school names were distinguished by their particular trade, for example No. 1 Air Observer School and No. 1 Air Navigation School. Pilot training schools were distinguished by the use of the word flying in the school's name. The use of the word flying in 1 CFFTS's name was a break with this tradition that changed again in 2014 when 1 CFFTS was amalgamated into 402 Squadron.

== See also ==
- 2 Canadian Forces Flying Training School
- 3 Canadian Forces Flying Training School
