= Beechcraft CT-134 Musketeer =

Canadian military aircraft

CT-134 Musketeer
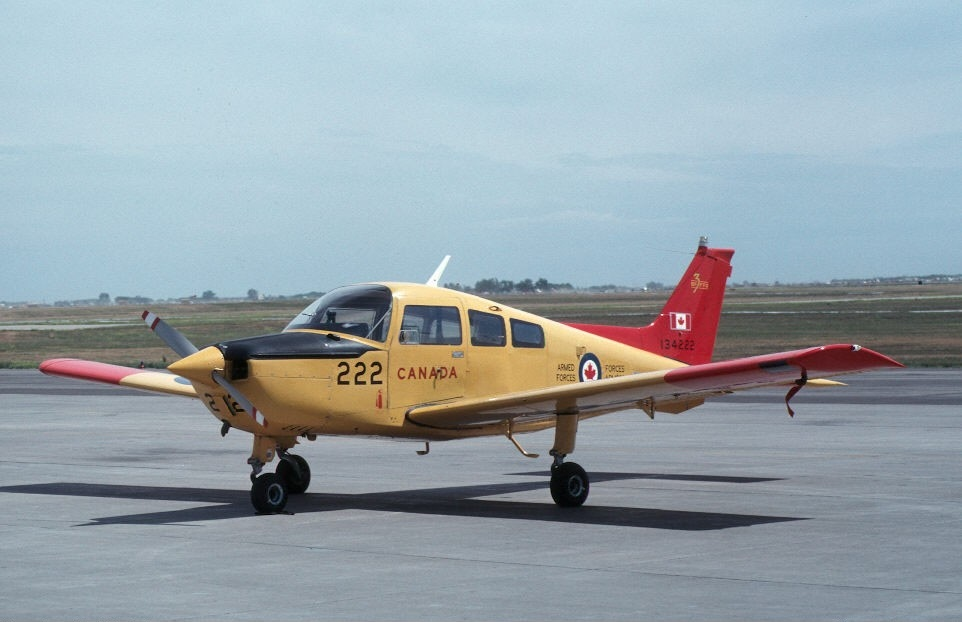
- CT-134 in 1980

General information
- Type: Basic trainer
- National origin: United States
- Manufacturer: Beech Aircraft Corporation
- Primary user: Canadian Armed Forces
- Number built: 48

History
- Introduction date: 1971
- Retired: 1992
- Developed from: Beechcraft Musketeer

The Beechcraft CT-134 Musketeer is a military training derivative of the Musketeer built by Beechcraft for the Canadian Armed Forces. The CT-134 was a single engine, low-wing, four-seat light aircraft with fixed landing gear and a limited aerobatic capability.

== Design and development ==
In the early 1960s, the Royal Canadian Air Force’s standard elementary training aircraft was the de Havilland DHC-1 Chipmunk. Flight instruction was completed by student pilots on the DHC-1 before they progressed to the then-brand-new Canadair CT-114 Tutor jet trainer. A decision was made by RCAF HQ to remove the DHC-1s from service and not replace them, as it was felt that the CT-114 was easy enough to fly that initial training was not needed. The CT-114 quickly developed a failure rate of near 95% amongst student jet pilots and it was clear that an elementary trainer was needed. Due to the RCAF's previous customer relationship with Beechcraft while operating that company's Expeditor twin-engine aircraft, a hasty purchase of twenty-four B23 Musketeers was made in 1971. The first CT-134 arrived at CFB Portage la Prairie on March 23, 1971.

The new trainers were designated CT-134 Musketeer in the then Canadian Armed Forces. The aircraft purchased were standard Model B23s equipped with the O-360-A4G engine of 180 hp (130 kW), modified by the addition of a cowling strake, horizontal stabilizer strake and ventral fin to improve spin recovery performance. They were initially serial numbered as 13401-13424, but were re-numbered 134001-134024 to avoid confusion with other CF aircraft serial numbers.

The initial batch of CT-134s was replaced in late 1981 with a purchase of twenty-four more aircraft. These were 1982 model Beechcraft C23 Sundowners and were designated by the CF as CT-134A Musketeer II. These were numbered 134025-134048.

The CT-134 was approved for limited aerobatics, including loops, rolls, chandelles and lazy eights.

== Operational history ==
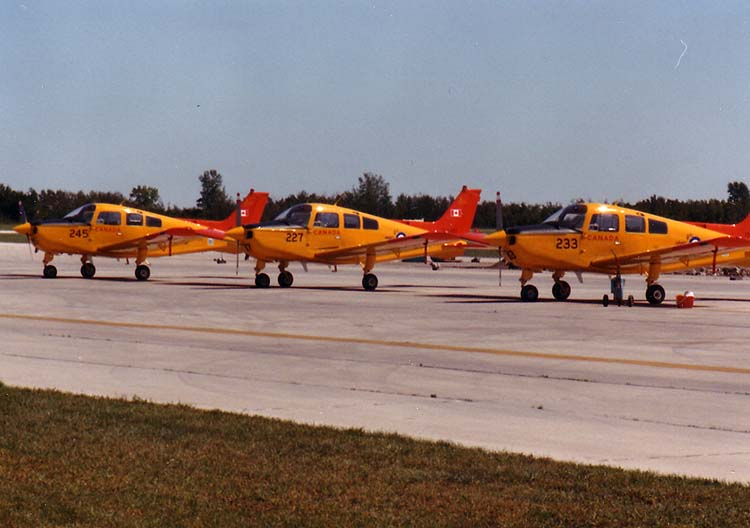
CT-134As from 3 Canadian Forces Flying Training School at CFB Portage la Prairie, Manitoba, 1982

Both batches of Musketeers served with 3 Canadian Forces Flying Training School and the Canadian Forces Flying Instructor School at CFB Portage la Prairie Manitoba and the Canadian Forces Central Flying School, in Winnipeg, until they were replaced by Slingsby Fireflys operated under contract by Bombardier Aerospace in 1992. During their 21 years of service, the CT-134 and CT-134A fleet at 3 CFFTS trained about 5,000 Canadian military pilot graduates.

In operational service, the CT-134 suffered very few accidents. One of the few serious accidents occurred on 23 March 1990 when Musketeer 134229 had an engine failure on take-off from Erickson Municipal Airport at Erickson, Manitoba, while giving familiarization flights to Royal Canadian Air Cadets. The accident was caused by fuel starvation and the aircraft was written off.

Maintenance of the CT-134 fleet was primarily carried out by the CFB Portage la Prairie Base Aircraft Maintenance Engineering Organization, with Depot Level Inspection and Repair (DLIR) being conducted by Field Aviation at Calgary International Airport in Calgary, Alberta.

Upon retirement, the CT-134s and CT-134As were not sold for flying use due to the structural problems they all suffered from years of aerobatics. Instead, they were donated to museums or used for air force and civil maintenance training. Some CT-134s still serve as monuments at a few current and former Canadian Forces Bases as well as Royal Canadian Legion halls, a distinction held by very few light aircraft in this class.

In Canadian military service, the aircraft was referred to by student and instructor pilots by the nickname Muskrat.

== Variants ==
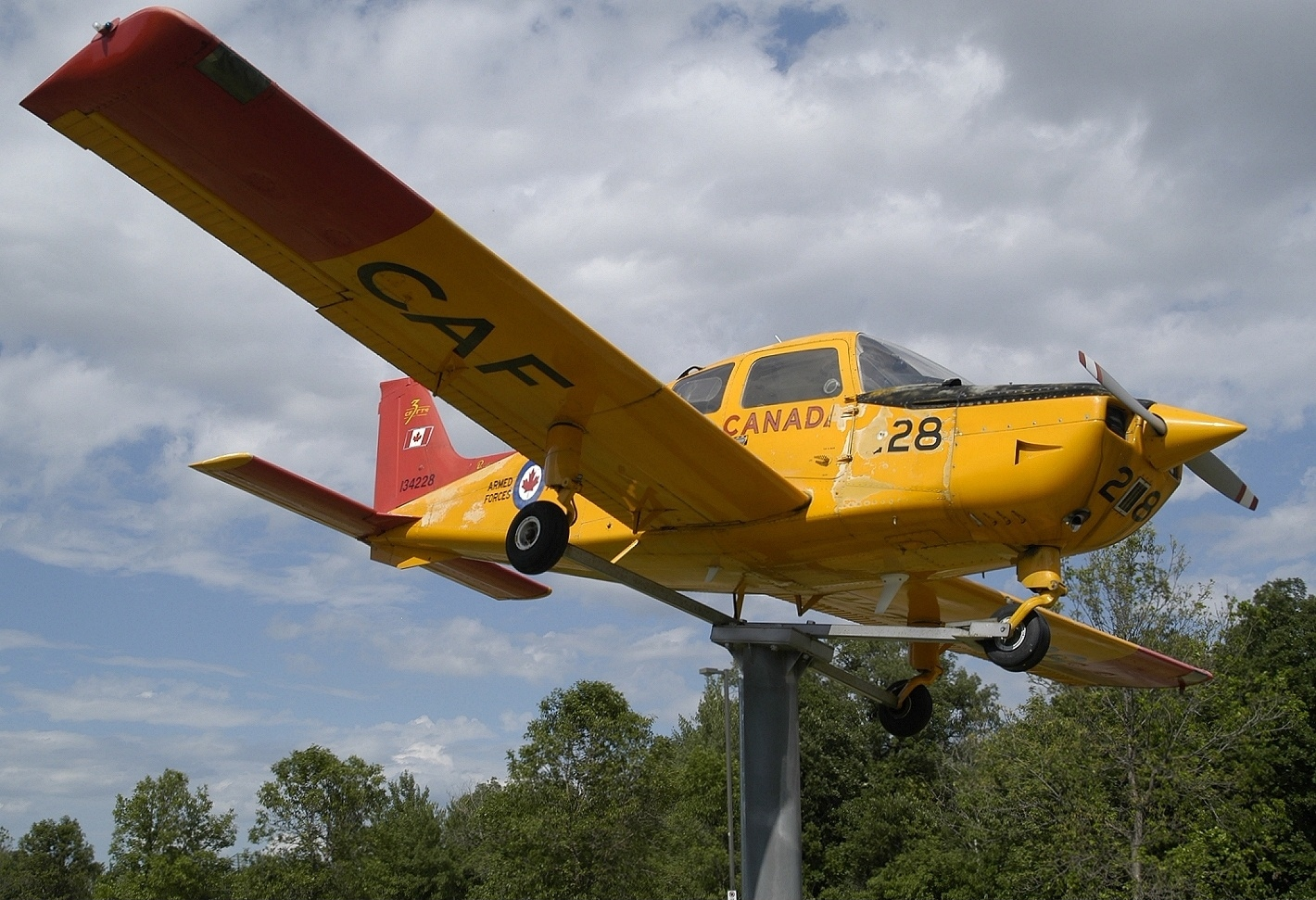
CT-134 on display in Canada

CT-134
Military version of the B23 Musketeer, powered by a 180 hp (130 kW) Lycoming O-360-A4G, 24 built.
CT-134A
Military version of the C23 Sundowner, powered by a 180 hp (130 kW) Lycoming O-360-A4K powerplant, 24 built.

== Military operators ==
Canada

- Canadian Armed Forces/Canadian Forces
  - 3 Canadian Forces Flying Training School
  - Canadian Forces Central Flying School
  - Canadian Forces Flying Instructor School

== Specifications (Sundowner 180 / CT-134A Musketeer II) ==
Data from Jane's All the World's Aircraft 1982-83

General characteristics

- Crew: 2
- Capacity: 2 passengers
- Length: 25 ft 9 in (7.85 m)
- Wingspan: 32 ft 9 in (9.98 m)
- Height: 8 ft 3 in (2.51 m)
- Wing area: 146 sq ft (13.6 m^{2})
- Airfoil: NACA 63_{2}A415
- Empty weight: 1,494 lb (678 kg)
- Gross weight: 2,030 lb (921 kg)
- Max takeoff weight: 2,450 lb (1,111 kg)
- Fuel capacity: 57 US gal (47 imp gal; 216 L) in two wing tanks
- Powerplant: 1 × Lycoming O-360-A4K 4-cylinder air-cooled horizontally-opposed piston engine, 180 hp (130 kW)
- Propellers: 2-bladed Sensenich Type 76EM8S5-0-60, 6 ft 4 in (1.93 m) diameter fixed-pitch propeller

Performance

- Maximum speed: 128 kn (147 mph, 237 km/h)
- Cruise speed: 126 kn (145 mph, 233 km/h) with 84% power at 4,500 ft (1,400 m)

105 kn (121 mph; 194 km/h) with 59% power at 4,500 ft (1,400 m)

- Stall speed: 51 kn (59 mph, 94 km/h) power off and flaps down
- Range: 641 nmi (738 mi, 1,187 km) with allowances for climb to 4,500 ft (1,400 m) and 45 minutes reserve
- Service ceiling: 12,600 ft (3,800 m)
- Absolute ceiling: 14,400 ft (4,400 m)
- Rate of climb: 792 ft/min (4.02 m/s)
- Wing loading: 16.78 lb/sq ft (81.9 kg/m^{2})
- Power/mass: 0.073 hp/lb (0.120 kW/kg)
- Take-off run: 1,130 ft (344 m)
- Take-off distance to 50 ft (15 m): 1,955 ft (596 m)
- Landing run: 703 ft (214 m)
- Landing distance from 50 ft (15 m): 1,484 ft (452 m)

Avionics
Standard instrument fit with radios and navigation equipment such as VOR/LOC

== See also ==
Related development

- Beechcraft Musketeer
- Beechcraft Duchess

Aircraft of comparable role, configuration, and era

- Cessna T-41 Mescalero
