= Canadian Forces Air Navigation School =

Coordinates: 49°53′20″N 097°14′05″W

The Canadian Forces Air Navigation School is located at CFB Winnipeg.

== From Observers to navigators ==
Canadian pilots in the Royal Flying Corps (RFC) learned rudimentary navigation during World War I, but separate observer schools were not introduced until 1918. Right up until the outbreak of World War II there was still no category of air observer in the Royal Canadian Air Force (RCAF).

== World War II ==
Royal Canadian Air Force specialty navigator training started in March 1942 as part of the British Commonwealth Air Training Plan. No. 1 Air Navigation School (1 ANS) moved to Rivers, Manitoba from Trenton, Ontario, in November 1940, and No. 2 Air Navigation School (2 ANS) started in Pennfield Ridge, New Brunswick in 1941. The two Air Navigation Schools, 1 ANS and 2 ANS, amalgamated on May 11, 1942, to form Central Navigation School. In early 1944 two other schools, 2 ANS and 3 ANS, (re)opened. Central Navigation School disbanded on September 15, 1945.

== Post-war ==
Central Navigation School was re-formed at Summerside, P.E.I., on August 1, 1951, and then moved to Winnipeg, Manitoba, in 1954.

In August 1967, CNS and Central Flying School (CFS) joined as Central Flying and Navigation School (CFNS) training both flying and navigation. In November 1968 navigator training was again separated from flying training, and became the specialty of the Canadian Forces Air Navigation School (CFANS).

In the early 21st century, CFANS expanded its role to include the training of Airborne Electronic Sensor Operators (AESOP).

== Present ==
On June 26, 2009 CFANS adopted the name of the Canadian Forces advanced pilot training school, 1 Canadian Forces Flying Training School (1 CFFTS), inheriting the histories of both advanced flying training and navigator training.

== See also ==
- 1 Canadian Forces Flying Training School
