= 435 Transport and Rescue Squadron =

- 435^{e} Escadron de transport et de sauvetage
- Squadron badge: a chinthe on a plinth
- Active: 1944–1946, 1946–present
- Country: Canada
- Branch: Royal Canadian Air Force
- Type: Tactical and strategic transport, aerial refuelling, search and rescue
- Part of: 19 Wing Comox
- Garrison/HQ: CFB Winnipeg
- Motto: Certi provehendi (Latin for 'Determined on delivery')
- Battle honours: Burma, 1944–1945; Libya, 2011
- Website: www.canada.ca/en/air-force/corporate/squadrons/435-squadron.html

Commanders
- Commander: Lieutenant-Colonel Wes Cromwell

Aircraft flown
- Transport: Douglas Dakota, Fairchild C-119 Flying Boxcar, Lockheed C-130B, Lockheed CC-130H Hercules

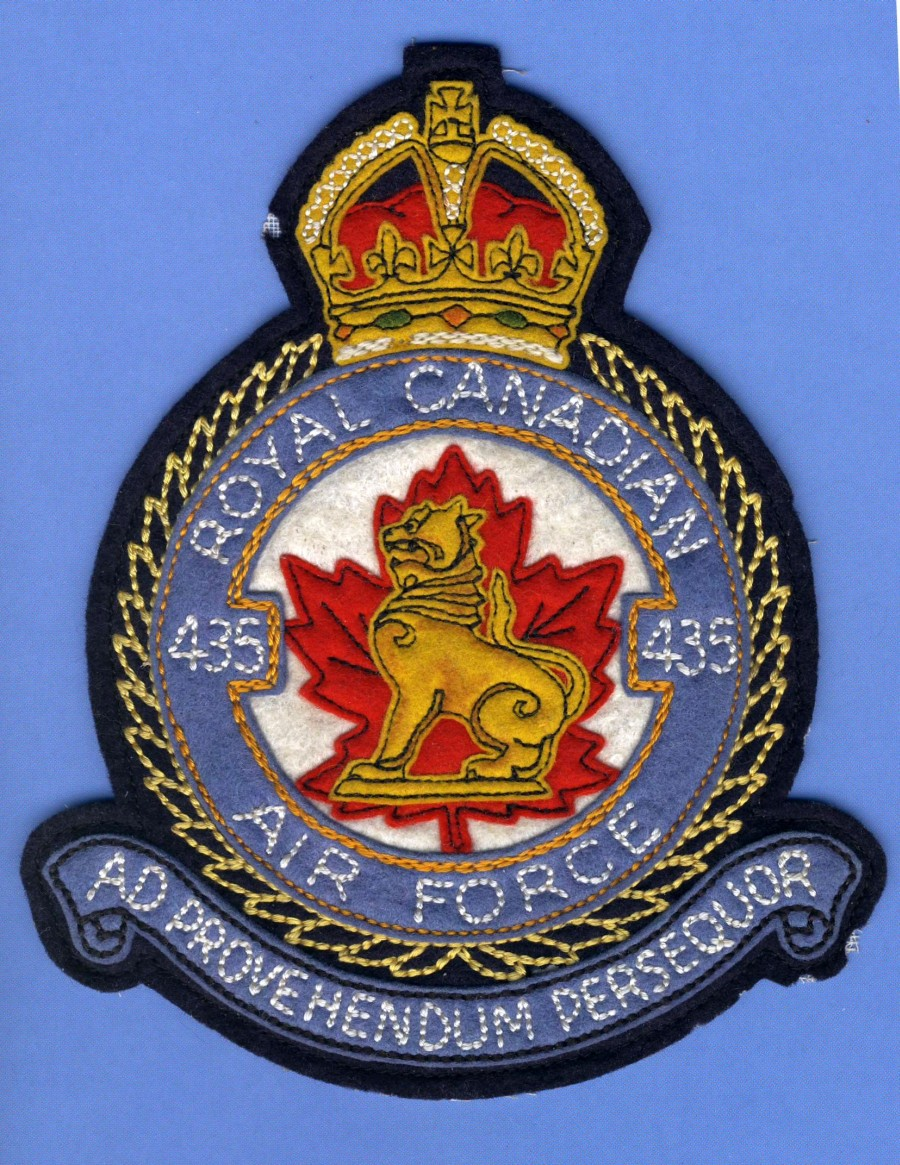
A Second World War jacket patch for 435 Squadron. Although there is no back-stamp, the design and quality are indicative as being made by Crest Craft, Saskatoon.

435 Transport and Rescue Squadron (French: 435^{e} Escadron de transport et de sauvetage), nicknamed "Chinthe Squadron", is a Royal Canadian Air Force strategic transport, aerial refuelling and search and rescue unit based at Canadian Forces Base (CFB) Winnipeg in the province of Manitoba, Canada. The squadron flies four Lockheed CC-130H Hercules aircraft. In addition to being the only provider of tactical fighter air-to-air refuelling in Canada, the squadron is a provider of primary search and rescue response for the largest search and rescue region in Canada, controlled from CFB Trenton. The squadron keeps an aircraft on constant readiness to deploy, with airborne search and rescue technicians (SAR techs) standing by to respond within 30 minutes of notification during weekdays and 2 hours at other times. The Trenton Search and Rescue Region, also covered by 424 Transport and Rescue Squadron, extends from Quebec City to the Rocky Mountains, and from the Canada–United States border to the North Pole, covering most of Central, Western, and Northern Canada.

== History ==
No. 435 Squadron RCAF was formed on 1 November 1944 in Gujarat, India, during the Burma Campaign, flying the Douglas Dakota in support of the Fourteenth Army. After war's end, the unit was relocated to England, where it provided transport to Canadian Army units in Europe. Deactivated on 1 April 1946 in England and re-activated three months later at RCAF Station Edmonton, the squadron relocated a few miles north to RCAF Station Namao in 1955, flying the Fairchild C-119 Flying Boxcar.

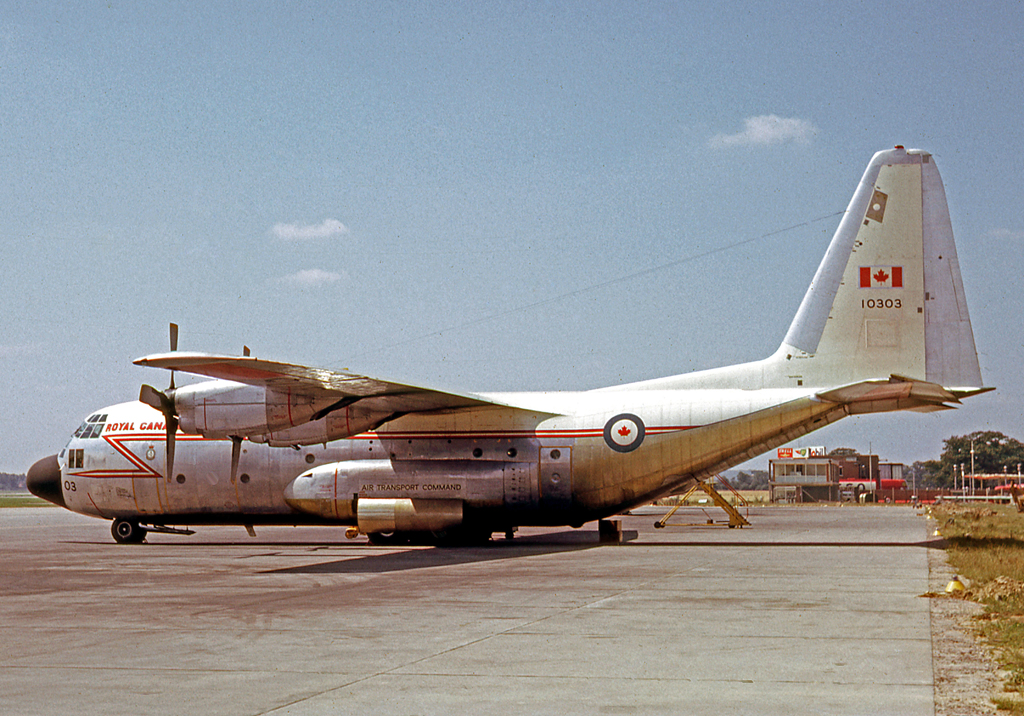
Lockheed C-130B Hercules of 435 Squadron wearing the markings of RCAF Air Transport Command when at London Gatwick in 1966.

The unit was re-equipped with the C-130B Hercules in 1960 and upgraded to the C-130E in 1966. Due to the Chrétien government's budget cuts and the resultant closure of the airfield at CFB Edmonton, the squadron was moved to 17 Wing Winnipeg in 1994, operating from Hangar 16, a recognized federal heritage building since 2007.

More recently, the squadron took part in Operation Southern Watch in Iraq, Operation Allied Force in Kosovo, Operation Noble Eagle domestically, and Operation Mobile during the 2011 Libyan civil war. The squadron has also participated in several exercises and support missions, and was the first Canadian unit to land a plane in Jacmel shortly after the devastating 2010 Haiti earthquake.

In 2026, 435 Squadron began transitioning to the CC-295 Kingfisher in a dedicated search and rescue role.
