= NATO Flying Training in Canada =

NATO Flight Training in Canada (NFTC) is a military flight training program for NATO and allied air forces provided by the Canadian Forces.

Located at 2 Canadian Forces Flying Training School, 15 Wing, CFB Moose Jaw in Saskatchewan and 4 Wing, CFB Cold Lake in Alberta, the program is delivered as a cooperative operation between a civilian contractor, CAE Inc. (CAE Training Centres), and the Royal Canadian Air Force (RCAF).

Two types of aircraft are flown at NFTC: the CT-156 Harvard II and the CT-155 Hawk. NFTC training consists of Phases II, III, and IV. Phase II is subdivided into IIA and IIB.

All pilots in the NFTC program undertake Phase IIA (Basic Pilot Training), which consists of 95.1 flying hours on the CT-156 Harvard II. After Phase IIA, students are split into 3 streams: fast-jet trainees (future instructors and/or fighter pilots); multi-engine trainees; and helicopter trainees.

Those moving on to Phase III training on the Helicopter and Multi-Engine tracks go to 3 Canadian Forces Flying Training School in Manitoba. Those selected for the Fast Jet track complete Phase IIB (another 45 flying hours on the Harvard II). Fast-jet candidates then move on to Phase III in Moose Jaw (69.8 flying hours). At the completion of Phase III, pilots are awarded their Pilot's Wings (Canadian Forces Flying Badge).

Future fighter pilots move on to Phase IV, still on the Hawk, but now at 419 Tactical Fighter Training Squadron in Cold Lake. Phase IV consists of 48.9 flying hours. Successful graduates of Phase IV are then trained on the CF-18 Hornet (CF-188) at 410 Tactical Fighter Operational Training Squadron.

Division of responsibilities between DND (RCAF), CAE, and participating Air Forces is as follows:

RCAF: All in-aircraft flying instruction is given by military pilots from the Canadian Forces. DND oversees training standards, provides Canadian military trainees, provides airspace, and dictates the syllabus.

CAE: The NFTC aircraft are owned by the Government of Canada, then leased to and maintained and serviced by CAE. Academic and simulator instruction is given by CAE employees (who must have had previous military flying instruction experience). CAE also operates infrastructure (buildings) and provides food services.

Other participating Air Forces: International program management, foreign military flight instructors, foreign military students, quality control.

== See also ==
- NATO Air Training Plan
