= Bluedrop Performance Learning =

Bluedrop ISM
- Company type: Private (since 2021); Public (prior to 2021)
- Industry: E-learning
- Founder: Emad Rizkalla
- Headquarters: 18 Prescott Street; St. John's, Newfoundland and Labrador; A1C 3S4
- Area served: Worldwide
- Number of employees: 130
- Subsidiaries: Bluedrop Training & Simulation Inc. Bluedrop ISM
- Website: www.bluedrop.com

Bluedrop ISM (formerly Bluedrop Performance Learning) is an e-learning company based in St. John's, Newfoundland and Labrador, Canada.

The company, founded in 1992 by President and CEO Emad Rizkalla, provides custom courseware and learning services for defence and aerospace, healthcare, small businesses and governments. Bluedrop Performance Learning has offices in Halifax, Fredericton, Ottawa, and Vancouver. The company currently employs more than 100 people and has developed e-learning courseware and learning tools for clients such as Dell Inc., Sony, Prentice Hall Inc., Pfizer, ExxonMobil and McGraw-Hill.

Bluedrop has two business units; The Defence and Aerospace (DA) Unit and the CoursePark Learning Services (CLS) Unit. Its DA unit produces mission training services for international military and commercial aviation clientele. Work in this unit has seen Bluedrop listed in Canada's 2011 Top 50 Defence Companies. Bluedrop's CLS is the developer of an online e-learning platform.

On January 26, 2012, the company completed a reverse takeover transaction with Serebra Learning Corporation. Completion of this transaction makes Bluedrop Canada's largest full service eLearning company.

The company was purchased by Rizbollo Holdings Limited and Name 3 Capital Inc. in April 2021 with its stock being delisted from the TSX Venture Exchange.
