= CFB Moose Jaw =

Canadian Forces base in Saskatchewan, Canada

15 Wing Moose Jaw Moose Jaw/Air Vice Marshal C.M. McEwen Airport
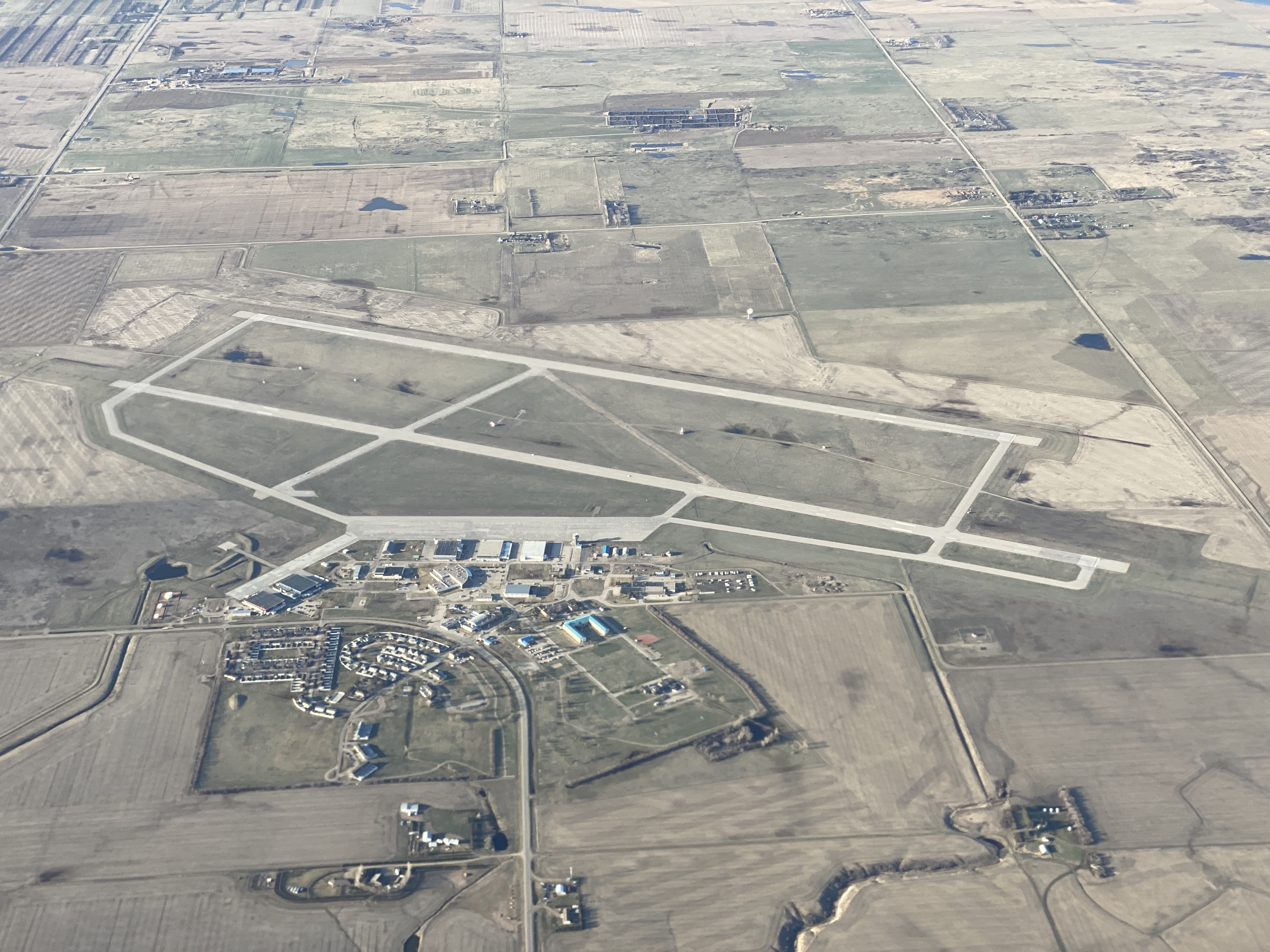
- IATA: YMJ; ICAO: CYMJ; WMO: 71864

Summary
- Airport type: Military
- Owner: Government of Canada
- Operator: DND
- Location: RM of Moose Jaw No. 161
- Time zone: CST (UTC−06:00)
- Elevation AMSL: 1,892 ft / 577 m
- Coordinates: 50°19′49″N 105°33′33″W

Map
- Location in Saskatchewan CYMJ (Canada)

Runways
Direction	Length		Surface
Direction	ft	m	Surface
03/21	3,460	1,055	Asphalt
11L/29R	8,320	2,536	Asphalt
11R/29L	7,280	2,219	Asphalt
- Source: Canada Flight Supplement; Environment and Climate Change Canada

Canadian Forces Base Moose Jaw (IATA: YMJ, ICAO: CYMJ), also known as 15 Wing Moose Jaw, is a Canadian Forces base located 4 nautical miles (7.4 km; 4.6 mi) south of Moose Jaw, Saskatchewan. It is operated as an air force base by the Royal Canadian Air Force (RCAF) and is home to RCAF Pilot training and 431 Squadron, the Snowbirds, which is the RCAF's air demonstration squadron.

The base's airfield is named after Air Vice-Marshal Clifford McEwen and is one of only three military aerodromes in Canada to be named after an individual, Valcartier (W/C J.H.L. (Joe) Lecomte) Heliport and Cold Lake/Group Captain R.W. McNair Airport being the others.

The airport is classified as an airport of entry by Nav Canada and is staffed by the Canada Border Services Agency (CBSA). The customs service is restricted to 15 Wing – Moose Jaw aircraft only.

== History ==
A civilian flying club aerodrome was established on the site south-southwest of Moose Jaw in 1928 by the Moose Jaw Flying Club. Its location surrounded by flat open prairie proved to be an ideal training site.

=== RCAF Station Moose Jaw ===
The declaration of World War II saw the Moose Jaw Flying Club initially contracted to provide pilot training for the Royal Canadian Air Force; however this was soon replaced by the far larger British Commonwealth Air Training Plan (BCATP) which saw the Government of Canada acquire the aerodrome and completely reconstruct it into RCAF Station Moose Jaw in 1940 with the new aerodrome opening in 1941.

Initially the Royal Air Force trained exclusively at the base under the RAF's No. 32 Service Flying Training School (SFTS) (ca. 1942) using Harvards, and later, Oxfords. No. 32 SFTS eventually broadened its intake to train 1,200 pilots for the air forces of Canada, the United Kingdom, Norway, New Zealand, Poland, France, Czechoslovakia, Belgium, the United States, and the Netherlands.

=== Aerodrome information ===
In approximately 1942 the aerodrome was listed at 50°20′N 105°33′W with a variation of 18 degrees east and elevation of 1,900 ft (580 m). Six runways were listed as follows:

Runway name	Length	Width	Surface
13/31	2,760 ft (840 m)	100 ft (30 m)	Hard surfaced
13/31	2,820 ft (860 m)	100 ft (30 m)	Hard surfaced
8/26	2,760 ft (840 m)	100 ft (30 m)	Hard surfaced
8/26	3,120 ft (950 m)	100 ft (30 m)	Hard surfaced
2/20	2,760 ft (840 m)	100 ft (30 m)	Hard surfaced
2/20	2,820 ft (860 m)	100 ft (30 m)	Hard surfaced

RCAF Station Moose Jaw had two relief landing fields. One was located at Buttress, Saskatchewan and one at Burdick (Moose Jaw Municipal Airport) .

In 1946 RCAF Station Moose Jaw was decommissioned and the aerodrome was returned to civilian service.

Because of rising Cold War tensions, the aerodrome was reactivated by the RCAF in 1953 as the site of military pilot training. RCAF Station Moose Jaw undertook additional construction to support its expanded personnel complement. The base was used by the RCAF and its NATO allies for pilot training, using both single-prop World War II-era Harvards and Canadair CT-133 Silver Star jet training aircraft. By the mid-1960s these were both replaced by the Canadian built CT-114 Tutor.

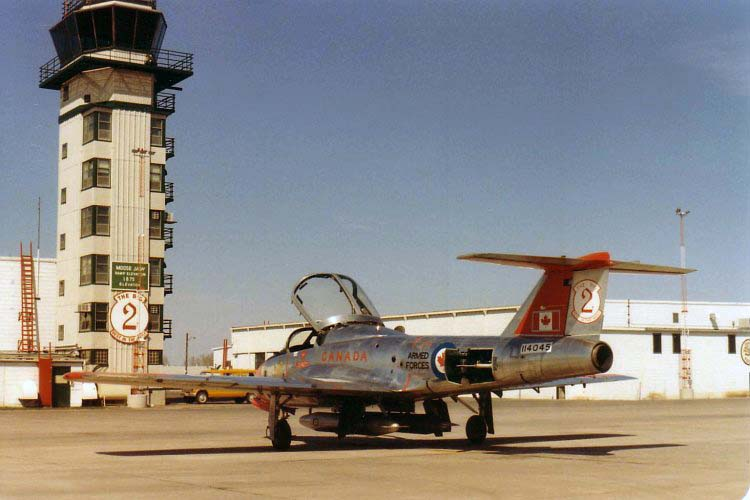
CT-114 Tutor jet trainer and the old Moose Jaw control tower in the spring of 1982

The Institute for Stained Glass in Canada has documented the stained glass at RCAF Base Chapel.

=== CFB Moose Jaw ===
In 1968 the RCAF merged with the Canadian Army and the Royal Canadian Navy to form the unified Canadian Forces. The base's name was changed to Canadian Forces Base Moose Jaw, usually shortened to CFB Moose Jaw. From 1968 until the formation of Air Command in 1975, CFB Moose Jaw fell under the direction of Training Command and served to house the Tutor Jet Training Program.

By the early 1990s, CFB Moose Jaw was operated by over 1,300 employees and made a significant economical impact on the region, but pending cutbacks in military spending spread rumours of possible closure of the base. In 1994, the Government of Canada awarded Bombardier with a 20-year contract to support the delivery of what is now the NATO Flying Training in Canada (NFTC) program. Many of the base's structures were renovated to accommodate new personnel and new training aircraft. Pilots from Denmark, Singapore, Great Britain, Italy, Hungary, Germany, Finland, and many other allied nations train at CFB Moose Jaw every year, ensuring the base's future with the Canadian Forces. In 2015, Bombardier sold its NFTC contract to CAE who are currently the prime contractor.

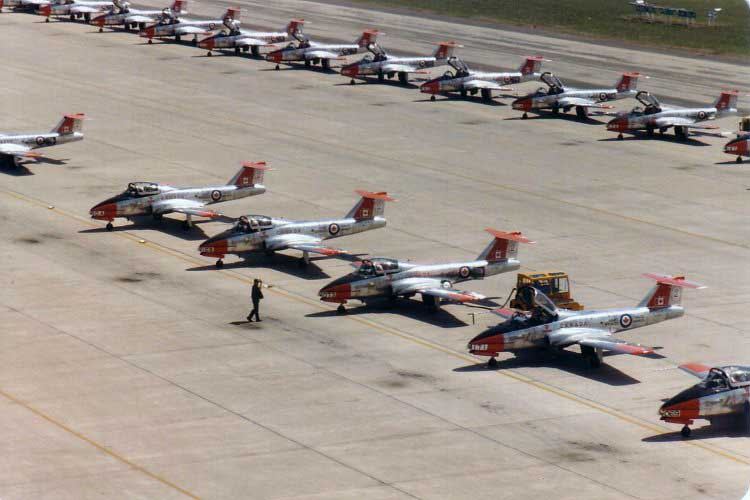
CT-114 Tutors belonging to 2 Canadian Forces Flying Training School parked on the ramp at CFB Moose Jaw, 1982

From 1970 until its disbandment in 1993 Moose Jaw had a Base Rescue Flight flying three CH-118 Huey helicopters.

During a reorganization at AIRCOM in the late 1990s, CFB Moose Jaw's various AIRCOM units were placed under a new primary lodger unit called "15 Wing"; consequently the base is now referred to as 15 Wing Moose Jaw.

== Current operations ==
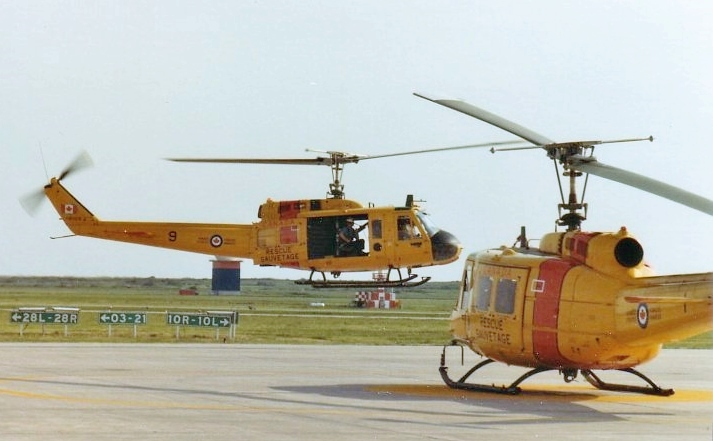
Base Rescue Moose Jaw CH-118 Iroquois helicopters at CFB Moose Jaw, 1982

15 Wing Moose Jaw is home to the following units:

=== CFB Moose Jaw ===
==== Integral Units ====
- 15 Wing/NFTC Headquarters
  - 15 Wing Air Reserve Flight
- CFB Moose Jaw
- 15 Operations Support Squadron
  - 15 Wing Air Traffic Control Flight
    - Military Terminal Control Unit
    - Military Aerodrome Control Unit
- 2 Canadian Forces Flying Training School (2 CFFTS)
- 431 Air Demonstration Squadron (also known as the "Snowbirds")

==== Canadian Armed Forces Lodger Units ====
- 23 Canadian Forces Health Services Centre, Detachment Moose Jaw
- 1 Dental Unit, Detachment Moose Jaw
- Real Property Operations Unit - West, Detachment Moose Jaw
- Canadian Armed Forces Transition Centre, Detachment Moose Jaw
- 14 Military Police Flight, 1 Military Police Squadron, Air Force Military Police Group

==== Other Lodger Units ====
- Defence Construction Canada, Moose Jaw Regional Office
- Canadian Forces Morale and Welfare Services
  - Personnel Support Program, Moose Jaw
  - Canadian Forces Exchange System (CANEX)
  - Military Family Resource Centre

==== NATO Flying Training in Canada (NFTC) ====
- CAE Inc - Prime Contractor
  - Serco - Air Traffic Control, Air Information Services, and Ground Electronic Services
  - ATCO Frontec - Facilities Management, Vehicle and Logistics Services, Fire/Crash Rescue Services, Airfield Infrastructure, Flight Training Facilities

=== Southport Aerospace Centre ===
==== Integral Units ====
- 3 Canadian Forces Flying Training School (3 CFFTS) - Southport, Manitoba

==== Contracted Flying Training and Support (CFTS) ====
- KF Aerospace - Prime Contractor
  - Canadian Base Operators - Air Traffic Control, Fire and Crash Support, Airfield Maintenance, Food Services, Administrative Support, IMIT, Housekeeping and Aeronatuical Information Services
  - Bluedrop Training & Simulation - Coursewear development
  - Canadian Helicopters - Helicopter maintenance and ground-based and simulation instructors.

== Future Aircrew Training Program (FAcT) ==
The NATO Flying Training in Canada and Contracted Flying Training and Support contracts expire in 2027. Future Aircrew Training Program (FAcT) will replace these two contracts as well as create a new contracted system for Air Combat Systems Officers and Airborne Electronic Sensors Operators. After the request for proposals going out on 11 February 2022, the new contract is expected to be awarded in 2023.

=== Prospective bidders ===
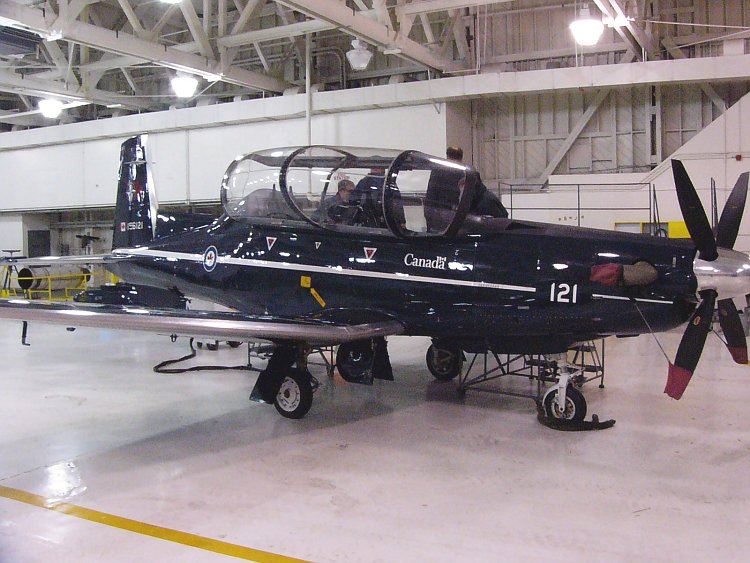
Raytheon CT156 Harvard II at CFB Moose Jaw, 3 November 2005

- SkyAlyne Canada Limited Partnership
  - Primary Partners
    - CAE Inc
    - KF Aerospace
  - Potential Sub-Contractors and Strategic Partners
    - ATCO Frontec
    - Bluedrop Training & Simulation
    - Canadian Base Operators
    - Canadian Helicopters
    - Lockheed Martin
    - PAL Aerospace
    - Serco
- Babcock Leonardo Canadian Aircrew Training
  - Primary Partners
    - Babcock Canada
    - Leonardo Canada
  - Potential Sub-Contractors and Strategic Partners
    - Top Aces
    - Flight Safety International
    - L3Harris
    - Athabasca Catering
    - The Loomex Group
    - Executive Flight Centre
    - Bird Construction
    - Dexterra

== See also ==
- Moose Jaw (Dr. F. H. Wigmore Regional Hospital) Heliport
- List of airports in Saskatchewan
