= 2 Canadian Forces Flying Training School =

Military flying school

Coordinates: 50°19′49″N 105°33′33″W

- 2^{e} École de pilotage des Forces canadiennes (French)
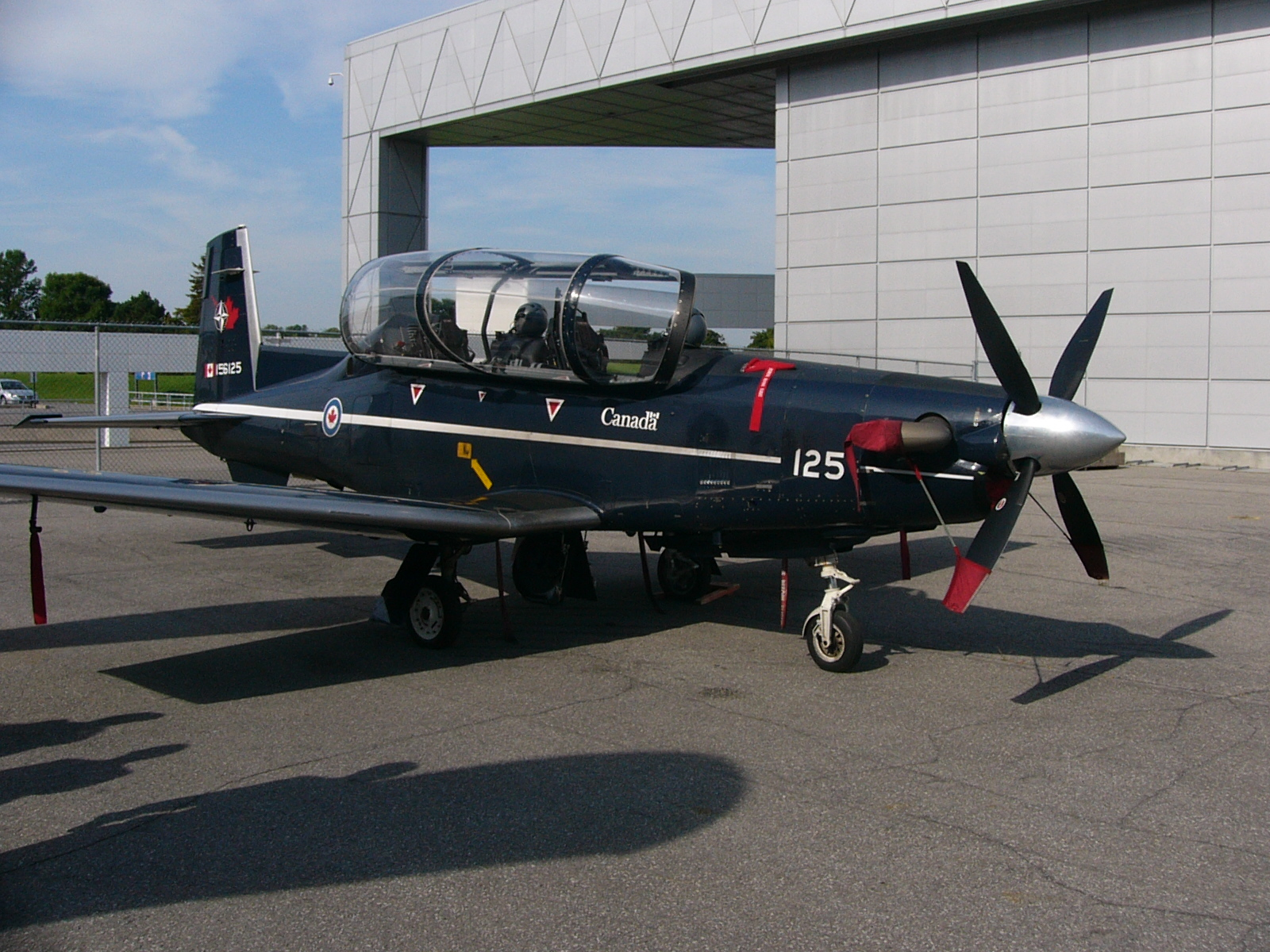
- Raytheon CT156 Harvard II of 2 CFFTS, at Rockcliffe Airport, 23 August 2008
- Country: Canada
- Branch: Royal Canadian Air Force
- Type: Military school
- Role: Flying training
- Part of: 15 Wing Moose Jaw
- Garrison/HQ: CFB Moose Jaw
- Nickname(s): Big 2
- Website: rcaf-arc.forces.gc.ca/en/training/2-flying-training-school.page

2 Canadian Forces Flying Training School (2CFFTS; French: 2^{e} École de pilotage des Forces canadiennes) is one of the Royal Canadian Air Force's training centres for pilots and also one of the facilities of the NATO Flying Training in Canada (NFTC) program.

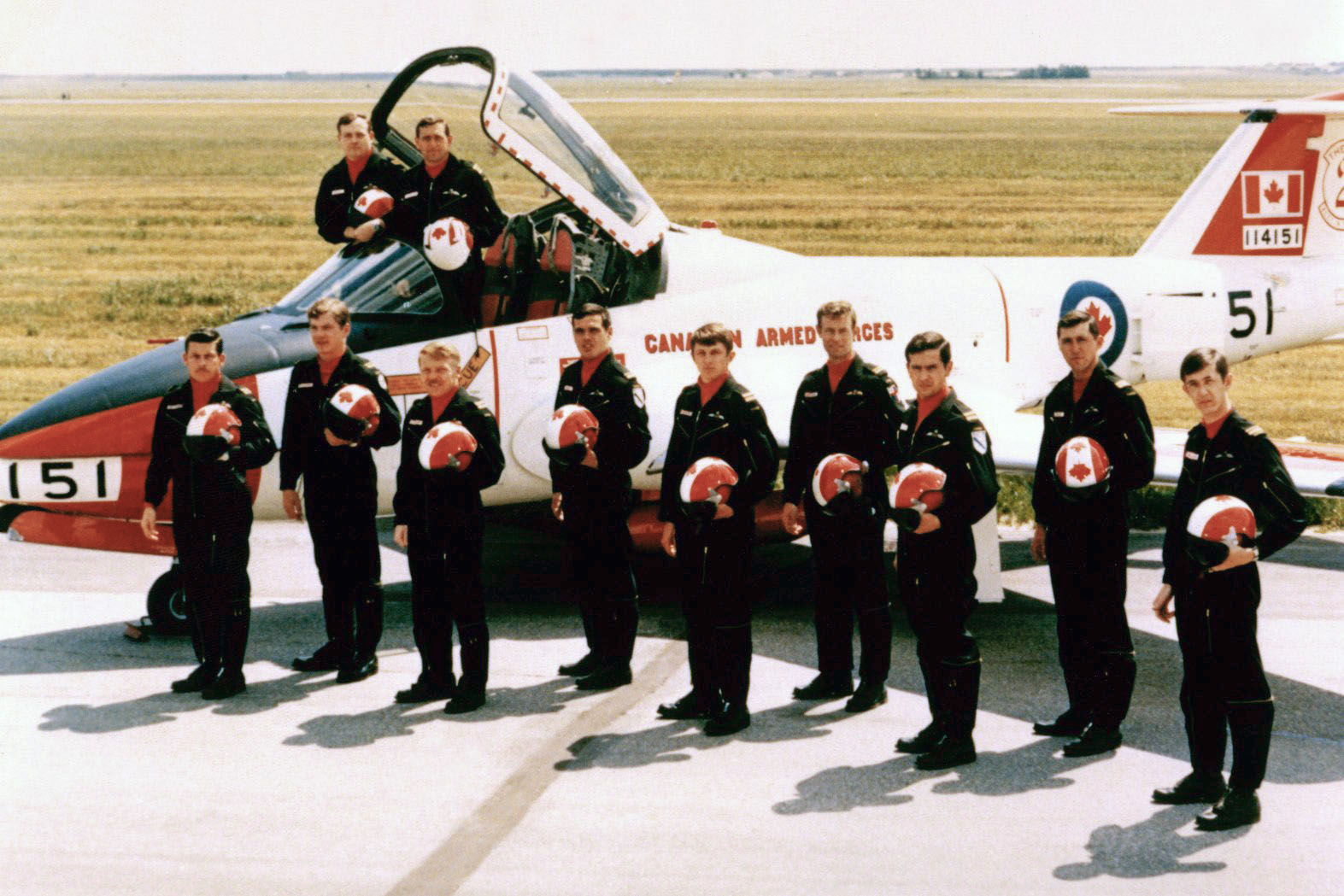
2 Canadian Forces Flying Training School instructors with a Canadian Forces Snowbirds aerobatic team CT-114 Tutor, 1971. These instructors were pilots of the 1971 season of the Snowbirds.

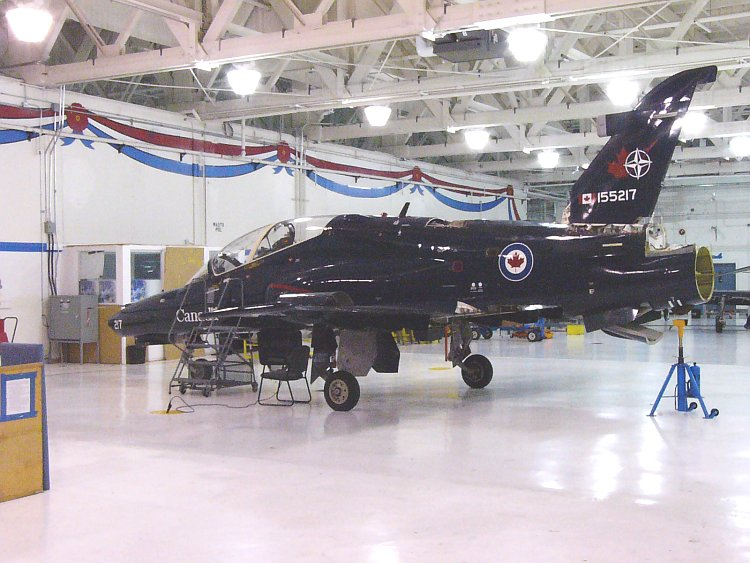
BAe CT155 Hawk of 2 CFFTS, at CFB Moose Jaw, 3 November 2005

== History ==
The school is at CFB Moose Jaw. Prior to operating the CT-155 and CT-156, 2CFFTS flew the CT-114 Tutor from 1964 until 1999.

Pilots at the school are in the Advanced Training section of the CF program with focus on:

- Phase II – Basic course with the CT-156 Harvard II after which students will be streamed into the different platforms (jet, multi-engine, or helicopter).
- Phase III Jet – Advanced course on the CT-156 Harvard II
- Phase IV Conversion – Conversion to the CT-155 Hawk to prepare students for further training at CFB Cold Lake

== Images ==
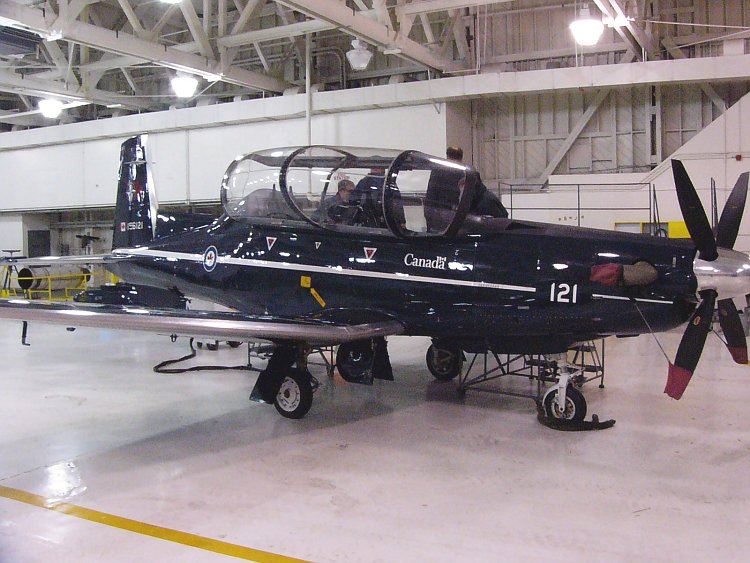
Raytheon CT156 Harvard II of 2 CFFTS, at CFB Moose Jaw, 3 November 2005 undergoing maintenance

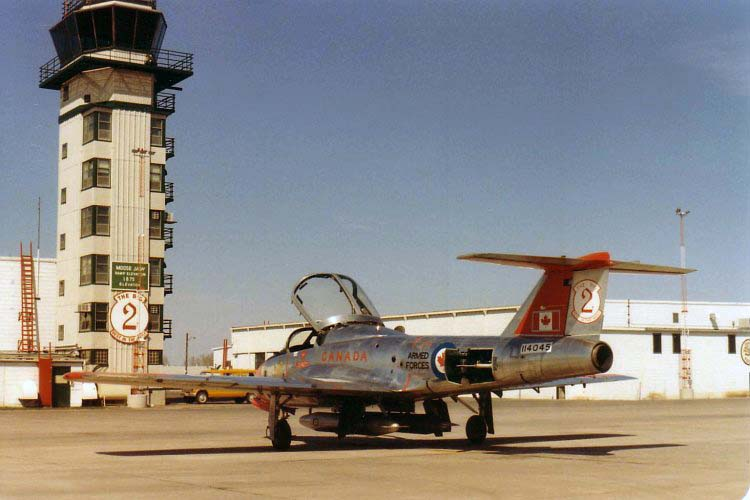
CT-114 Tutor jet trainer and the old Moose Jaw control tower in the spring of 1982

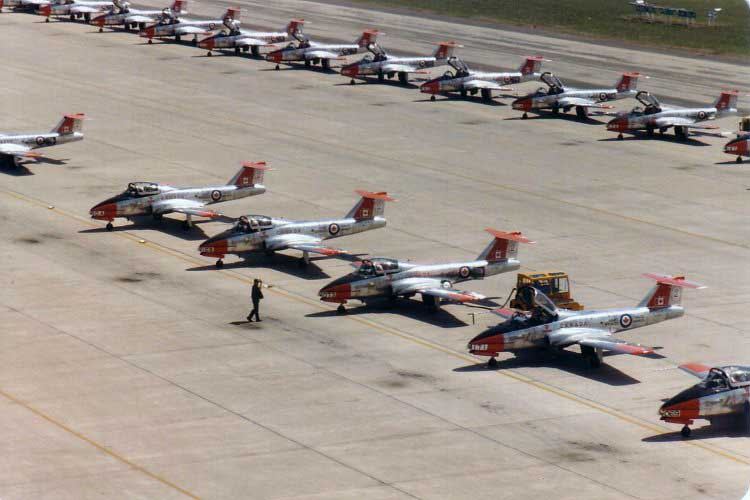
CT-114 Tutors belonging to 2 Canadian Forces Flying Training School parked on the ramp at CFB Moose Jaw, 1982

== Badges ==
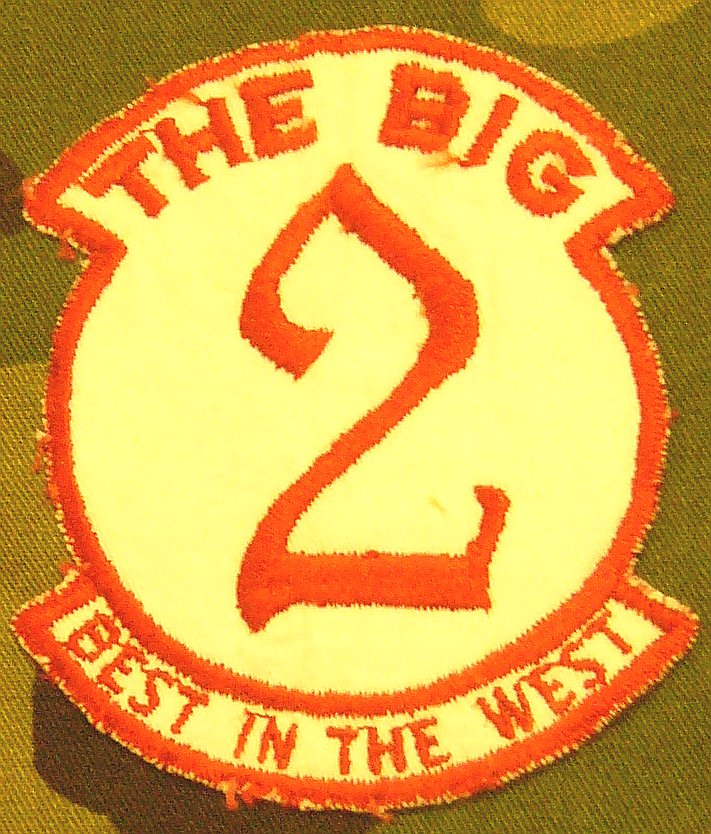
2 CFFTS Big 2 badge 1981

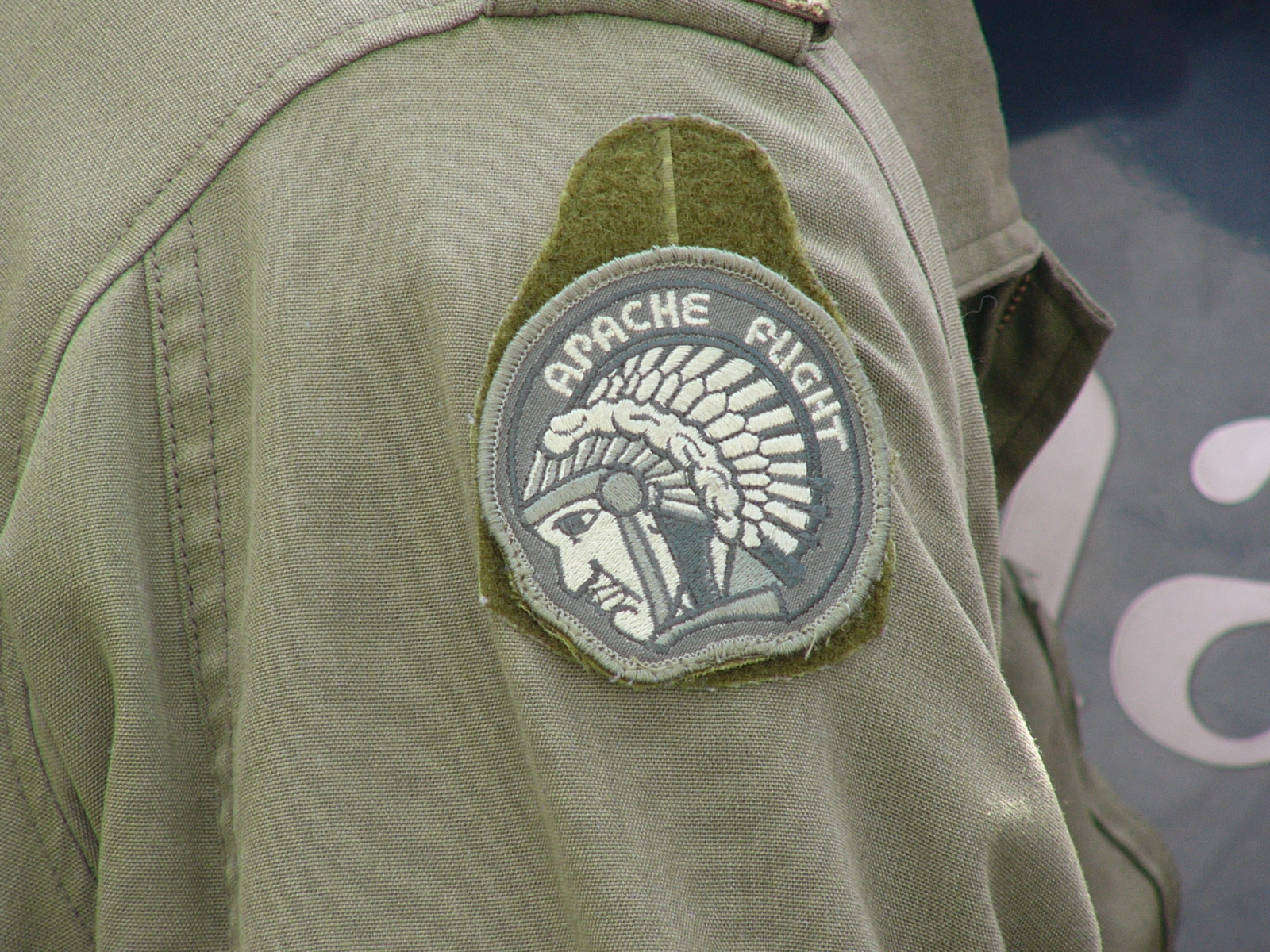
"A" Flight badge 2008

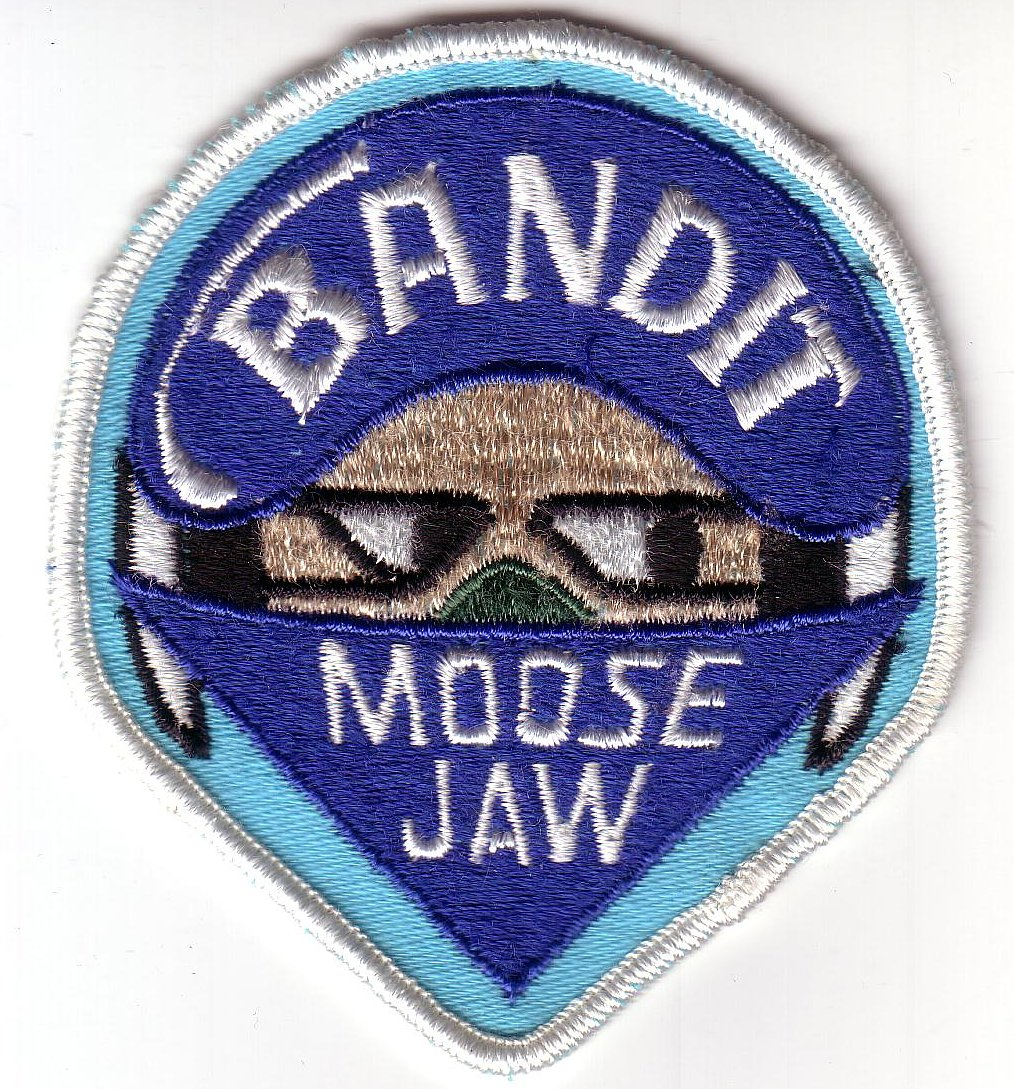
"B" Flight badge 1981

"C" Flight badge 1981

"D" Flight badge 1981

"E" Flight badge 1981. Eagle Flight was the Ground Training School (GTS)

Standards Flight badge 1981. Snapper Flight was responsible for evaluating students through flight testing.

Qualified Flying Instructor badge 1981

== See also ==
- 1 Canadian Forces Flying Training School
- 3 Canadian Forces Flying Training School
