= 3 Canadian Forces Flying Training School =

Canadian military flying unit

Coordinates: 49°54′11″N 098°16′26″W

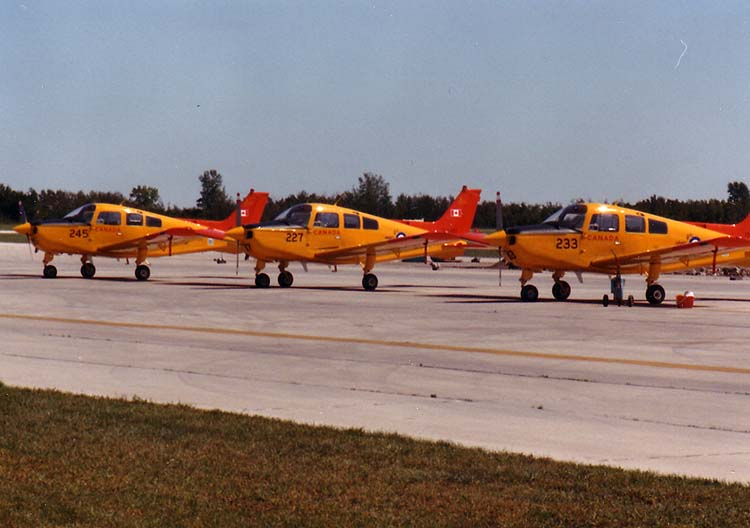
CT-134A Musketeers at 3 Canadian Forces Flying Training School at CFB Portage la Prairie, Manitoba, 1982.

3 Canadian Forces Flying Training School (3 CFFTS; French: 3^{e} École de pilotage des Forces canadiennes) is at the Southport Aerospace Centre just south of Portage la Prairie, Manitoba, Canada.

3 CFFTS conducts Primary Flight Training on the Grob G 120A. Helicopter training on the Bell CH-139 Jet Ranger and the Bell 412 helicopter (retired Bell CH-146 Griffons). Multi-engine training is conducted on the Beechcraft King Air C-90B.

The school is based at the Portage la Prairie Southport Airport (formerly Canadian Forces Base Portage la Prairie) and operates as part of 15 Wing Moose Jaw. The service companies of KF Defence Programs and Southport Aerospace Centre provide all support services for 3 CFFTS, including aircraft maintenance and airfield operations.

3 CFFTS uses civilian pilots to teach primary pilot training and air navigator courses. Military pilots are employed to teach helicopter and multi-engine aircraft courses.

== History ==
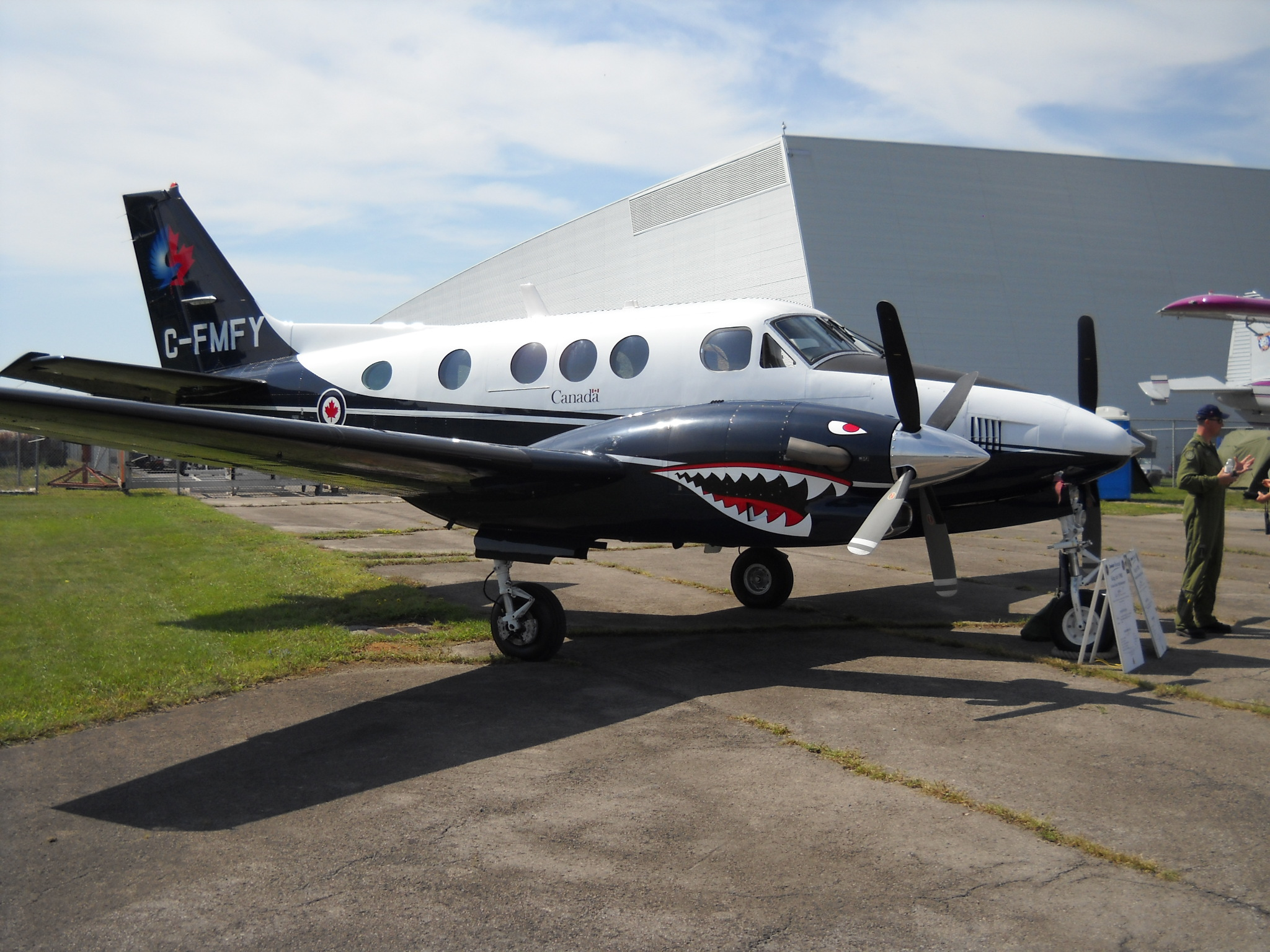
Beechcraft C-90A King Air belonging to KF Defence Programs and assigned to 3CFFTS, August 2010

Portage la Prairie has been the site of military primary flight training since World War II when it was home to No. 14 Elementary Flying Training School, part of the British Commonwealth Air Training Plan. Following the war, the base was retained as the home of the 3 Flying Training School (3 FTS) Royal Canadian Air Force, the direct ancestor of 3 CFFTS.

3 CFFTS was first formed on 1 July 1970 at CFB Portage la Prairie. It was made up of personnel and equipment are drawn from 1 Primary Flying School, CFB Borden, who flew the de Havilland Canada CT-120 Chipmunk trainers, 4 Flying Training School, CFB Rivers who flew Hiller CH-112 Nomad helicopters and 3 Flying Training Schools, Portage la Prairie, who flew the Beech CT-128 Expeditor multi-engine trainer.

During 1971, the Chipmunks were replaced with the Beechcraft CT-134 Musketeers, and the Nomads were replaced by Bell CH-136 Kiowas.

During the 1970s, the school created two air demonstration teams, staffed by instructors, the Dragonflies, flying the CH-136 Kiowa and the Musket Gold with CT-134 Musketeer.

In 1981, the CT-134 Musketeers needed replacement, and a newer version, the Beechcraft C23 Sundowners, was procured as the CT-134A Musketeer. At the same time, the CH-136 Kiowas were returned to the tactical helicopter squadrons from which they had come and were replaced by new-purchase CH-139 Jet Rangers.

In 1992, CFB Portage la Prairie was closed, and the base facilities were turned over to a new civil organization, the Southport Aerospace Centre. All previous support functions, including the provision of aircraft and their maintenance and the airport's running, were contacted out to civilian companies.

This new Contracted Flight Training and Support Program replaced the Musketeers with Slingsby T-67C Firefly trainers. Contract civilian instructors replaced the military instructors who had taught the Primary Flying Course.

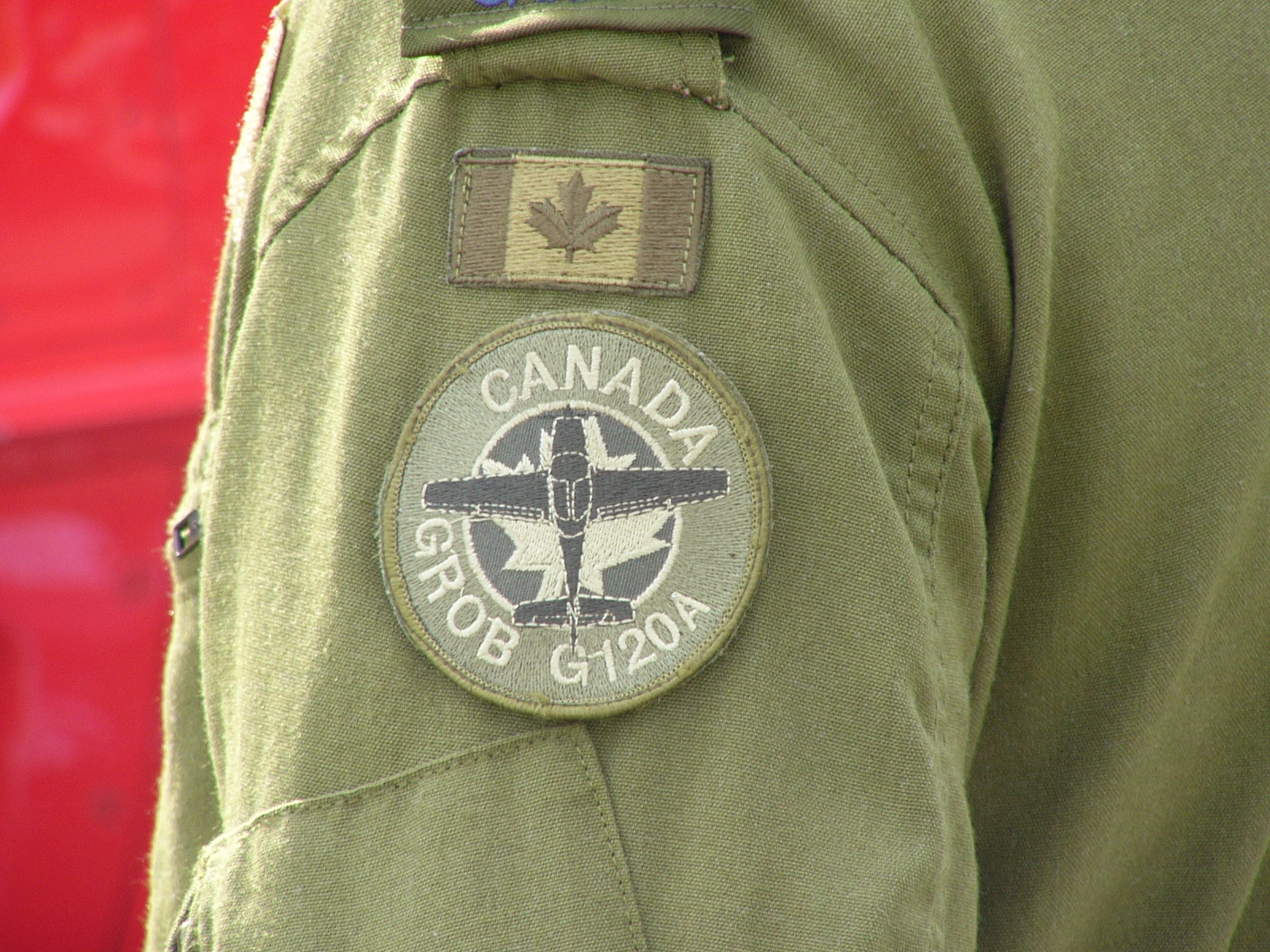
Grob G-120A badge, 2008

Multi-engine and helicopter training was conducted by military instructors using the Beech C90A King Air and the CH-139 Jet Rangers.

In 2005, a $1.77 billion, 20-year Contracted Flying Training and Support Contract was awarded to Allied Wings, now called KF Defence Programs, to continue the program to 2025. This resulted in the following equipment changes:

- Slingsby T-67C Fireflies replaced with Grob G-120As
- C-90A King Airs replaced with Raytheon C-90B King Airs.
- CH-139 Jet Rangers refurbished
- Nine former CH-146 Griffons added to the 3 CFFTS fleet for advanced helicopter training.

== See also ==
- 1 Canadian Forces Flying Training School
- 2 Canadian Forces Flying Training School
- Royal Canadian Air Force helicopters
- List of aircraft of the Royal Canadian Air Force
