= List of airlines of Canada =

This is a list of airlines of Canada which have one or more of the following: an air operator's certificate issued by Transport Canada, an ICAO airline designator, Canadian domestic designator, call sign, or aircraft registered with Transport Canada. Please see lists of airlines by provinces or territories for sorted lists.

== Airlines with scheduled passenger service ==
Airline	Founded	AOC	IATA	ICAO	Call sign	Registered aircraft	Hub airport(s) or headquarters	Image	Notes
Air Borealis	2017	18875		LBR	NORTHLIGHT	11	Goose Bay		
Air Canada	1937	5262	AC	ACA	AIR CANADA	256	Montréal–Trudeau; Toronto–Pearson; Vancouver		Flag carrier and largest domestic and international airline of Canada by seat capacity
Air Canada Rouge	2013	17978	RV	ROU	ROUGE	38	Montréal–Trudeau; Toronto–Pearson		Low-cost carrier, wholly owned subsidiary of Air Canada
Air Creebec	1982	8982	YN	CRQ	CREE	19	Montréal–Trudeau; Val-d'Or		Regional airline, charters
Air Inuit	1978	2955	3H	AIE	INUIT	31	Montréal–Trudeau		Passenger service, charters, combi, cargo, helicopter
Air Liaison	2001	15715	Q9	LSJ	LIAISON	10	Québec City		
Air North	1977	3121	4N	ANT	AIR NORTH	9	Whitehorse		Passenger service, charters, cargo
Air Tindi	1988	3169	8T	TIN	TINDI	27	Yellowknife; Fort Simpson		Passenger service, charters
Air Transat	1986	5311	TS	TSC	AIR TRANSAT	42	Montréal–Trudeau		Passenger service, charters Owned by Transat A.T.
Aklak Air	1977	2273	6L			0	Inuvik		Aircraft owned by Kenn Borek. Passenger service, charters
Bearskin Airlines	1963	1861	JV	BLS	BEARSKIN	49	Sioux Lookout; Thunder Bay		Aircraft owned by Perimeter Aviation; Regional airline, charters
Buffalo Airways	1970	5319	J4	BFL	BUFFALO	55	Hay River		Passenger service, charters, cargo, and aerial firefighting Featured on Ice Pilots NWT
Calm Air	1962	1487	MO	CAV	CALM AIR	15	Thompson		Passenger service, charters, cargo
Canadian North	1946	107	5T	AKT	ARCTIC	33	Yellowknife		Passenger service, charters
Central Mountain Air	1987	3999	9M	GLR	GLACIER	26	Smithers		Regional, charters
Corilair		5695				4	Campbell River–Water		Charters and scheduled floatplane
Flair Airlines	2005	14941	F8	FLE	FLAIR	20	Edmonton		Passenger and charter low-cost carrier airline
Harbour Air Seaplanes	1982	4001	H3	HR	HARBOUR EXPRESS	42	Vancouver Harbour		Passenger service, charters
Helijet	1986	4622	JB	JBA	HELIJET	18	Vancouver		Passenger service, charters
Iskwew Air	2018	18845		SG	SWEETGRASS	2	Vancouver		Also offers charters
Jazz Aviation	2001	5002	QK	JZA	JAZZ	114	Calgary; Halifax; Montréal–Trudeau; Toronto–Pearson; Vancouver		Formally Jazz Aviation LP; Regional and charter airline Operates as Air Canada Express
Missinippi Airways		4077		MA	MISSINIPPI	10	The Pas/Grace Lake; Thompson; Flin Flon; Pukatawagan		Passenger service, charters
North-Wright Airways	1986	5732	HW	NWL	NORTHWRIGHT	17	Norman Wells		Regional, charters
Northway Aviation	1962	1568		NAL	NORTHWAY	9	Winnipeg/St. Andrews		Bush airline, charters
Pacific Coastal Airlines	1987	2870	8P	PCO	PASCO	23	Vancouver		Regional, charters
PAL Airlines	1974	2659	PB	PVL	PROVINCIAL	14	St. John's		Regional, charters
Pascan Aviation	1999	18611		PSC	PASCAN	12	Montreal–Metropolitan		Regional airline, charters
Perimeter Aviation	1960	1861	4B	PAG	PERIMETER	49	Winnipeg		Passenger service, charters, MEDIVAC (air ambulance), flight training
Porter Airlines	2006	15266	PD	POE	PORTER AIR	76	Ottawa; Toronto–City; Toronto–Pearson		Mainline airline
Rise Air	2021	12508	9T	RS	RISE AIR	36	Prince Albert		Regional, charters. 35 aircraft registered under Transwest Air, 1 under West Wind Aviation (Note: West Wind Aviation still has an ICAO airline designator, WEW, and an ICAO call sign, WESTWIND.)
Seair Seaplanes	1980	5082				12	Vancouver–Water		Floatplane service, charters
Thunder Airlines	1994	8882		THU	AIR THUNDER	14	Thunder Bay		Passenger service, charters
Tofino Air		18343				2	Tofino		Floatplane service, charters
Vancouver Island Air	1985	4801				3	Campbell River–Water		Floatplane service, charters
Wasaya Airways	1989	11802	WT	WSG	WASAYA	18	Thunder Bay		Regional, charters, cargo
WestJet	1994	8893	WS	WJA	WESTJET	181	Calgary; Vancouver; Toronto–Pearson		Canada's second largest airline in terms of aircraft, after Air Canada
WestJet Encore	2013	17903	WR	WEN	ENCORE	47	Calgary		Regional airline, wholly owned subsidiary of WestJet

== Other airlines ==
Airline	Year established	AOC	IATA	ICAO	Call sign	Registered aircraft	Hub airport(s) or headquarters	Image	Notes
Adlair Aviation	1983	3350				3	Cambridge Bay		Charters
Aeroflyer						2			737-600 charters
Airborne Energy Solutions	1984 (renamed airborne energy solutions in 2006)					67 (2013)			
Air Bravo	2001	12515		AB	BRAVO	13	Thunder Bay		Charters and air ambulance
ACASS CANADA									
Air Canada Jetz	2001	5262				0	Montréal–Trudeau		Executive charter service operated by Air Canada using Airbus A320 aircraft
Air Montmagny		280				5	Montmagny		Charters, skydiving
Air Nunavut (Smooth Air)		5343		BFF	AIR BAFFIN	14	Iqaluit		Charters and MEDIVAC (air ambulance) only.
Air Partners		15320		SDE	STAMPEDE	15	Calgary		Charters Take Flight
Air Spray		351		ASB	AIR SPRAY	51	Red Deer		Aerial firefighting
Airco Aircraft Charters		5705		ARQ	AIRCO	6	Edmonton		Charters
Airmedic		18018		MDC	AIRMEDIC	5	Montreal Metropolitan		Air ambulance
AirSprint		11653		ASP	AIRSPRINT	32	Calgary International		Fractional ownership of aircraft
Alkan Air		3574		AKN	ALKAN AIR	21	Whitehorse		Charters and MEDIVAC (air ambulance)
Anderson Air		12618		ADS	ANDERSON	8	Vancouver		Charters
Aqsaqniq Airways							Taloyoak / Yellowknife		Inuit owned airline, subsidiary of Air Tindi
Atlantic Air Charters		4114				6	Grand Manan		Charters, aircraft registered as Manan Air Services
Bar XH Air				BXH	PALLISER	2	Medicine Hat		Charters and MEDIVAC (air ambulance). Formerly part of Integra Air
Breton Air		18992				4	Sydney		Helicopter tours and transportation
Can West Corporate Air Charters		5659		CWA	CAN WEST	18	Edmonton		Charters
Canadian Air National		19432		EN	ENBRIDGE	1	Grimsby		Charters in aerial work
Canadian Helicopters (HNZ Global)		11988		CDN	CANADIAN	88	Les Cèdres		Helicopter charter service
Canlink Aviation		763		MFC	EAST WIND	60	Greater Moncton		Flight training
Capital Helicopters		10533				6	Whitehorse		Helicopter charter service. Bell 206 and Robinson R44 Raven II aircraft.
Cargojet		11674	W8	CJT	CARGOJET	38	Hamilton		Cargo
Carson Air		6255		CRN	CARSON	18	Kelowna		Flight school, charters, air ambulance
Cascadia Airways				CBF	BIGFOOT	2	Vancouver		Was KD Air
Chartright Air		5932		HRT	CHARTRIGHT	45	Mississauga		Charters and MEDIVAC (air ambulance)
CHC Global Operations		11988		HMB	HUMMINGBIRD	0	Les Cèdres		Charters, flight training, aerial firefighting. Along with Kelowna Flightcraft Air Charter, Atlantis Systems International and Canadian Base Operators operates Allied Wings.
CHC Helicopters Canada		17211		RDB	REDBIRD	1	Vancouver		Helicopter charters, flight training
Chrono Aviation		17931		NDL	NEEDLE	9	Montreal Metropolitan, Québec City, Rimouski		Passenger and cargo charter services
Chrono Jet		18498		MBK	MATBLACK	5	Montreal Metropolitan, Québec City, Rimouski		Passenger and cargo charter services
Conair Group		2626		FGD	FIREGUARD	59	Abbotsford		Retrofitting firefighting aircraft and aerial firefighting
Cougar Helicopters		4791		CHI	COUGAR	9	St. John's		Scheduled passenger service to oil platforms and ships off the Newfoundland coast; charter airline
Custom Helicopters		3207		TF	TRAUMA FLIGHT	41	Winnipeg/St. Andrews		Helicopter charter service
Dehcho Airways									
Dehcho Regional Helicopters									
EVAS Air (Exploits Valley Air Services)		6676	8K	EV	EVAS	30	Gander		Sightseeing flights, air ambulance services, cargo and maintenance
Exact Air		14555		ET	EXACTAIR	38	Baie-Comeau		Scheduled, charter passenger and cargo services, as well as supplying aviation fuel, ground services and aircraft maintenance and repair
Fast Air		4701		PBR	POLAR BEAR	19	Winnipeg		Air ambulance services, charter, helicopters (Fast Air Helicopters)
Flightexec		5808		FEX	FLIGHTEXEC	1	Buttonville, London		Charter airline, MEDIVAC (air ambulance)
Flightpath Charter Airways		15508		KNT	KINETIC	15	Montréal–Trudeau		Charters
FlyGTA Airlines		18765		TOR	HOMERUN	5	Toronto–City		Charters, tours and charter airline
Geographic Air Surveys		2735		GSL	SURVEY CANADA	1	Edmonton		Aerial surveys
Glencore Canada Corporation		12522		RAG	RAGLAN	2	Mississauga		Swiss multinational commodity trading and mining company
Great Slave Helicopters		4756				34	Yellowknife		Helicopter charter service
Harv's Air Service		1194				41	Steinbach (South)		Charters, flight training, air taxi
Helicopter Transport Services		185				33	Carp		Charters, MEDIVAC (air ambulance), aerial firefighting
Hope Air				HH	HOPE AIR	0	Toronto		Charity providing non-emergency medical flights
Hydro-Québec		10509		HYD	HYDRO	3	Montreal		Quebec public utility that manages the generation, transmission and distribution of electricity
iFly College		19638				9	Québec City		Flight training, was Visionair Quebec
Image Air Charter		15127		BMG	BOOMERANG	14	Toronto Pearson		Charters
IMP Group International		1764		EXA	CANADIANEXECAIRE	26	Abbotsford		Investment corporation, operates Cascade Aerospace
International Test Pilots School (ITPS Canada)		17775		SA	STALLION	21	London		Test pilot school recognized globally by the international Society of Experimental Test Pilots and the Society of Flight Test Engineers
Irving Oil Transport		16120		KCE	KACEY	2	Saint John		New Brunswick based gasoline, oil, and natural gas producing and exporting company
Keewatin Air		782	FK	KEW	BLIZZARD	24	Rankin Inlet		Charters and MEDIVAC (air ambulance) only
Kenn Borek Air		2273	4K	KBA	BOREK AIR	33	Calgary International		Charters, aircraft leasing
KF Cargo (Kelowna Flightcraft)		884	KW	KFA	FLIGHTCRAFT	11	Kelowna		Cargo charter airline. Along with Canadian Helicopters, Atlantis Systems International and Canadian Base Operators operates KF Defence Programs.
Kississing Lake Lodge		11747		WN	WINGS NORTH	34	Steinbach		Floatplanes, fly-in fishing camps
Kudlik Aviation		17247		KUK	KUDLIK	3	Québec City		Charters
Landa Aviation (L & A Aviation)		3709		LA	LANDA	6	Hay River		Charters
LR Helicopters		16122		LR	LR / CHED / MEDIA	12	Calgary/Springbank		Charters, flight training
Maritime Air Charter		10413				1	Halifax		Charter. Provides fixed-wing service for Environment Canada to Sable Island.
Max-Aviation		5092		MAX	MAX AVIATION	12	Montreal Metropolitan, Québec City, Rimouski		Air taxi
McMurray Aviation		4719				20	Fort McMurray		Charters, flight training
Miccar Aerial		15400		GT	GOOD SPIRIT	13	Yorkton		Operate agricultural aircraft for crop dusting. They also offer flight training and aircraft maintenance.
Montair Aviation				MT	MONTAIR	18	Pitt Meadows		Flight school
Morningstar Air Express		681		MAL	MORNINGSTAR	22	Edmonton		Cargo airline, operates a FedEx Canada contract
Nakina Air Service		2807	T2	KN	NAKINA	3	Nakina Water		Floatplane charters
Nav Canada		10497		NVC	NAV CAN	2	Ottawa		A not-for-profit corporation that owns and operates Canada's civil air navigation system
Newfoundland Helicopters		10216				10	Clarenville		Helicopter charter service
Nolinor Aviation		10705		NRL	NOLINOR	19	Montréal–Mirabel		Charter airline
Nor-Alta Aviation			LT			0	Fort Vermilion, High Level		See CanWest Air
North Cariboo Air		1444		NCB	NORTH CARIBOU	19	Fort St. John		Charter airline
North Star Air		11025		BF	BLACKFLY	14	Thunder Bay		Charter airline
Northern Air Charter		3747		NLI	NORTHLINK	5	Peace River		Charters, air ambulance
Northern Air Solutions		14952		NA	NORTHERN AIR	2	Muskoka		Charters, aerial photography and air ambulance
Northern Thunderbird Air		11492		NTA	THUNDERBIRD	16	Prince George		Charters
Northwestern Air	1965	271	J3	PLR	POLARIS	13	Fort Smith		Charters, cargo
Novajet		15472		NOJ	NOVAJET	26	Mississauga		Charters
Ookpik Aviation		16081				3	Baker Lake		Charters
Ornge Air (rotary wing division)		16002		LF	LIFEFLIGHT	12	Mississauga		Helicopter air ambulance
Ornge		16002		PUL	PULSE	8	Thunder Bay, Sioux Lookout, Timmins		Air ambulance
Pacific Seaplanes		18099		SP	SURFER	3	Nanaimo Harbour Water		On-demand flights and charters
Pacific Sky Aviation		15764		LVW	LONGVIEW	5	Calgary International		Twin Otter flight training
PAL Aerospace		17595		SPR	SPEEDAIR	21	St. John's		Search and rescue, aircraft maintenance, and intelligence, surveillance and reconnaissance
Panorama Aviation		18183		PNO	PANO	8	Alma		Air taxi, air ambulance
Partner Jet		10731		PSC	PARTNERJET	0	Toronto Pearson		Charters
Peregrine Aerial Surveys		18014		SEE	SEEKER	5	Abbotsford		Aerial surveys
Phoenix Heli-Flight		6701		HES	HERO	10	Fort McMurray		Helicopter tours, charters, MEDIVAC, aerial firefighting, and aerial photography
Pivot Airlines		19227	ZX	GGN	GREAT NORTH	2	Toronto Pearson		Charter airline
Privateair (Private Air)		17505		FSY	FROSTY	15	Toronto Pearson		Charter
Propair		253		PRO	PROPAIR	16	Rouyn-Noranda		Charter airline, MEDIVAC (air ambulance)
Rangeland Helicopters		14953		HA	HALO	2	Medicine Hat		Helicopter charters and maintenance, part of Bar XH Air
Sandy Lake Seaplanes							Sandy Lake		
Seneca College				BZQ	STING	21	Peterborough		Flight training
Silverline Helicopters						1	Holland Landing		Helicopter charters and flight training
SkyCare Air Ambulance (2080061 Ontario Inc.)		15337		PHX	PHOENIX NORTH	24	Sioux Lookout		Air ambulance
Skycharter				SKL	SKYCHARTER	14	Toronto Pearson		Charters, fixed-base operations (FBO), maintenance, MEDIVAC (air ambulance)
SkyLink Express		8857		SLQ	SKYLINK	19	Toronto Pearson		Charters, cargo
SkyNorth Air		15113		SN	SKYNORTH	7	Winnipeg		Charters
Skyservice Business Aviation		11797		SYB	SKYBIZ	58	Montréal–Trudeau, Toronto Pearson		Charters, MEDIVAC (air ambulance)
Slate Falls Airways (2320127 Ontario Inc.)		18070		SYJ		5	Sioux Lookout Water, Sioux Lookout		Scheduled and chartered floatplanes. Only four aircraft are listed at the official site.
Starlink Aviation		3966	Q4	TLK	STARLINK	19	Montréal–Trudeau		Charters
STARS Aviation		5699			STAR	12	Calgary		Non-profit helicopter air ambulance
Summit Air		17940		SUT	SUMMIT	24	Yellowknife		Charters
Summit Helicopters		15469		KM	KAMI	10	Kamloops		Helicopter charters
Suncor Energy		8508		JSN	JETSUN	1	Calgary		Canadian energy company
Sunwest Aviation		5404		CNK	CHINOOK	29	Calgary International		Charters, fixed-base operations (FBO), maintenance, MEDIVAC (air ambulance)
Superior Airways		14801		SR	SUPERIOR	14	Red Lake		Charters
Tantalus Air				TTU	TANTALUS	1	Vancouver Harbour		Scheduled passenger service, charters, part of Harbour Air Seaplanes
Tli Cho Air									Joint airline with Air Tindi
Tintina Air		17372		TA	TINTINA	8	Whitehorse		Charters
Top Aces		15039		FD	FISHBED	50	Montreal		Military flight training
Trans Capital Air		6948		TC	TRANS CAPITAL	6	Toronto City		Charter operator on behalf of the United Nations
Van City Seaplanes		11442		VC	VAN CITY	3	Coquitlam		On-demand charters
Vanguard Air Care		18840		VN	VANGUARD	6	Winnipeg		Air ambulance
VIH Helicopters		1255				16	Victoria		Charters, MEDIVAC (air ambulance), aerial firefighting
Voyageur Airways		2473	VC	VAL	VOYAGEUR	43	North Bay		Charters, MEDIVAC (air ambulance)
Westair Aviation		5458		NLF	NORTHERN LIFE	1	Kelowna		Charters
White River Air		1041		WRA		4	White River Water		Fly-in outposts
Wilderness Air Escapes		1707				5	Vermilion Bay Water		

== Aviation museums ==
Airline	Year established	AOC	IATA	ICAO	Call sign	Registered aircraft	Hub airport(s) or headquarters	Image	Notes
Canadian Warplane Heritage Museum		10747		CWH	WARPLANE HERITAGE	32	Hamilton		Aviation museum
Jet Aircraft Museum				JA	JAM	3	London		Aviation museum
Vintage Wings of Canada				GHK	GOLDEN HAWK	3	Gatineau-Ottawa		Aviation museum
Waterloo Warbirds		18419		WB	WARBIRD	0	Waterloo		Aviation museum

== Aircraft manufacturers ==
Airline	Year established	AOC	IATA	ICAO	Call sign	Registered aircraft	Hub airport(s) or headquarters	Image	Notes
Airbus Canada		18582		ABK	AIRBUS CANUCK	3	Fort Erie		Helicopter manufacturer
Bell Textron Canada				TXH	TEXTRON	11	Montréal–Mirabel		Aerospace manufacturer
Bombardier Inc.		14892		BBA	BOMBARDIER	16	Dorval		Business jet manufacturer
Pratt & Whitney Canada		7046		PWC	PRATT	4	Longueuil		Aircraft engine manufacturer
Viking Air				VKN	TRUE NORTH	19	Victoria		Aircraft manufacturer building 400 Series de Havilland Canada DHC-6 Twin Otter and DHC-2 Beaver

== Government ==
Airline	AOC	IATA	ICAO	Call sign	Registered aircraft	Hub airport(s) or headquarters	Image	Notes
Government of Ontario	321		ONT	ONTARIO (GOVERNMENT)	33	Toronto		There are 28 aircraft operated by the Ministry of Natural Resources and four by Community Safety and Correctional Services.
Government of Quebec	1776		QUE	QUEBEC	21	Quebec City		Provincial government
Ontario Provincial Police	11448		GD	GUARDIAN	5	Orillia		Provincial police service of Ontario
Royal Canadian Mounted Police			SST	STETSON	34	Ottawa		Canada's national police service
Saskatchewan Government Air Ambulance Service	380		SLG	LIFEGUARD	4	Saskatoon		Saskatchewan provincial air ambulance service
Transport Canada	2134		TGO	TRANSPORT	47	Ottawa		Government of Canada department

== See also ==
- List of defunct airlines of Canada
- Lists of airlines
- List of airports in Canada

== Bibliography ==
- Blatherwick, F.J. (1989). A history of airlines in Canada. Toronto, Ontario: The Unitrade Press.
