= Portage la Prairie Airport =

Portage la Prairie Airport may refer to:

- Canadian Forces Base Portage la Prairie
- Portage la Prairie/Southport Airport
- Portage la Prairie (North) Airport, a small public airport

== See also ==
- Portage la Prairie (disambiguation)
