= Kelowna Flightcraft =

Kelowna Flightcraft may refer to:

- KF Aerospace (Kelowna Flightcraft Ltd), an approved maintenance organization (AMO) which operates two maintenance, repair and overhaul (MRO) facilities in Canada
- KF Cargo (Kelowna Flightcraft Air Charter), a cargo airline based in Kelowna, British Columbia, owned by KF Aerospace
