= Northern Air =

Northern Air may refer to:

- Northern Air (Fiji), a Fijian airline
- Northern Air Charter, a Canadian airline
- Northern Air Cargo, an American airline

== See also ==
- Northern Airways, later Brockway Air, an American airline
- Northern Airlines, earlier Connellan Airways, an Australian airline
- Northern Air Service, an American airline merged into Northern Consolidated Airlines and Wien Air Alaska
