= KF Cargo =

Canadian cargo airline

IATA	ICAO	Call sign
FK	KFA	FLIGHTCRAFT
- Founded: March 20, 1970
- AOC #: Canada: KF Cargo: 884; Kelowna Flightcraft: 14657; United States: UKFF210F
- Hubs: Kelowna International Airport; Vancouver International Airport
- Fleet size: 14
- Destinations: 5
- Parent company: Barry Lapointe Holdings Ltd.
- Headquarters: Kelowna, British Columbia
- Website: www.kfaero.ca/flight-ops/air-cargo/

Kelowna Flightcraft Air Charter trading as KF Cargo and Kelowna Flightcraft trading as KF Maintenance and Engineering is a cargo airline based in Kelowna, British Columbia, Canada. It operates long term cargo charters for couriers and freight companies, forest fire patrols, and aircraft sales and leasing in Canada and worldwide. It also provides maintenance and aircraft manufacturing services.

== History ==
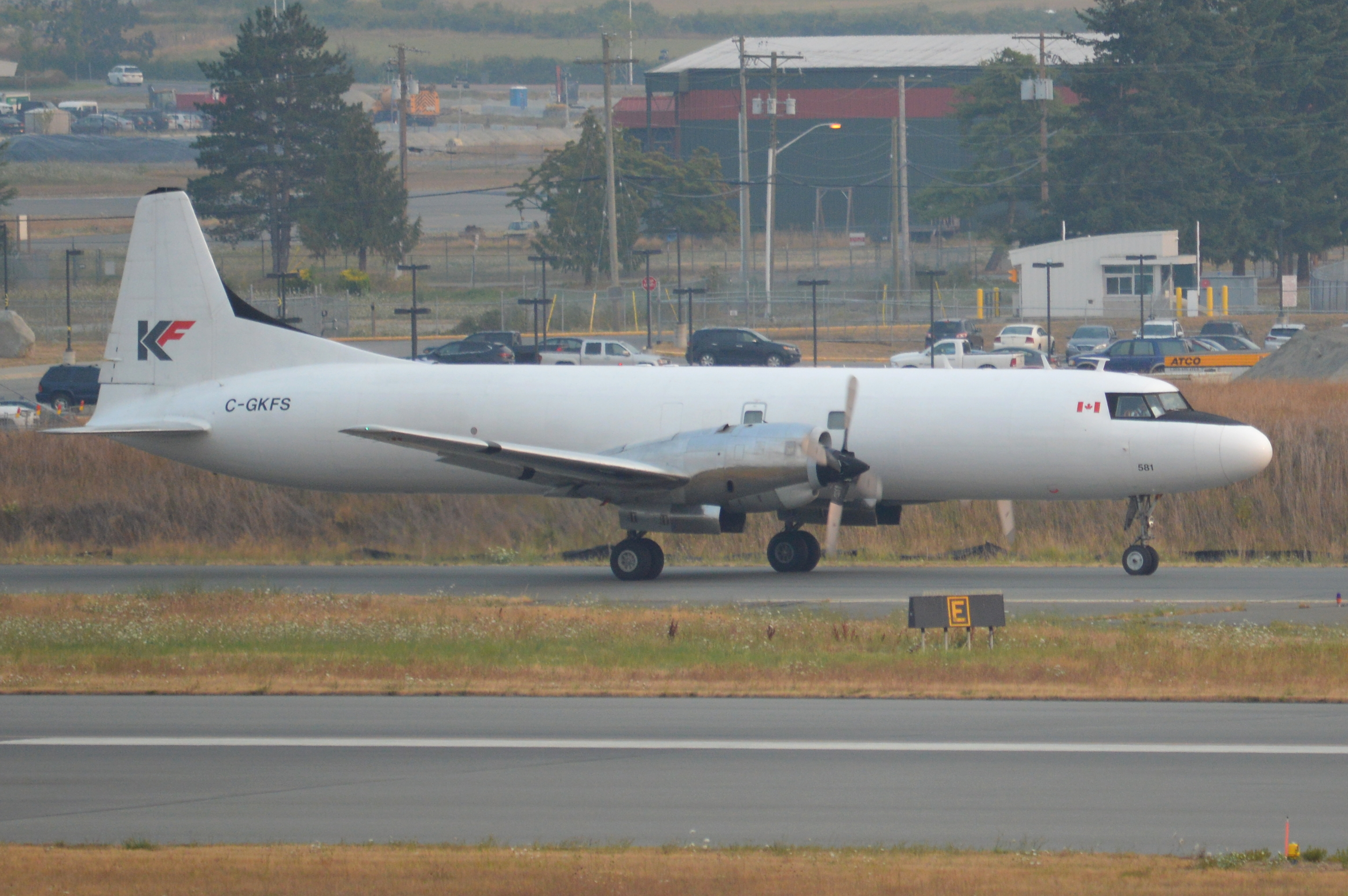
A KF Cargo Convair 5800

KF Cargo is a subsidiary company of KF Aerospace, which was established as Kelowna Flightcraft on March 20, 1970, and the cargo subsidiary was established and started operating in June 1974. It is wholly owned by Barry Lapointe Holding.

== Destinations ==
As of March 8, 2026, KF Cargo operates air cargo services to the following destinations:

- Kelowna International Airport
- Kamloops Airport
- Prince George Airport
- Nanaimo Airport
- Vancouver International Airport Hub
- Victoria International Airport

== Fleet ==
=== Current fleet ===
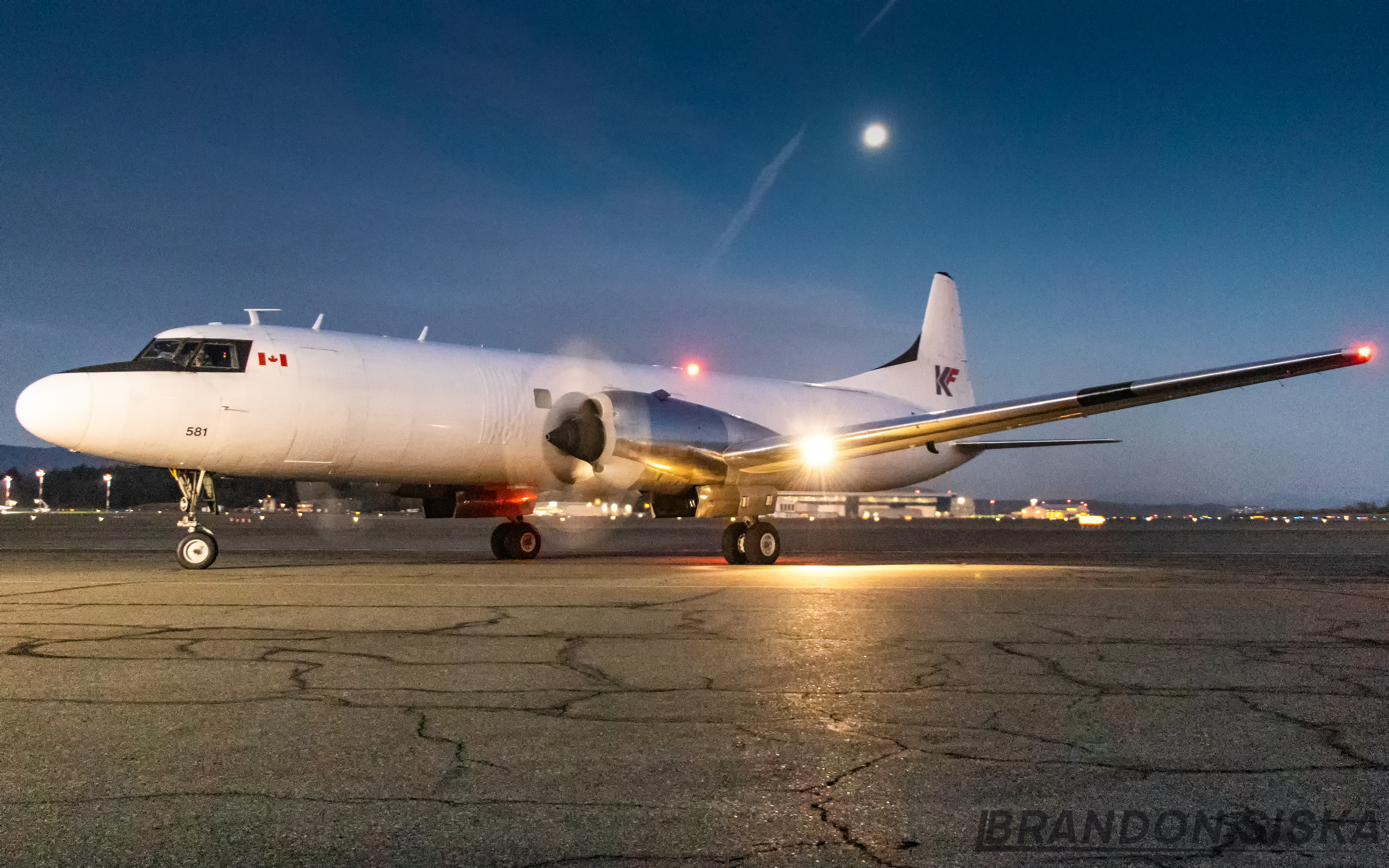
A KF Cargo Convair 5800

As of March 8, 2026, Kelowna Flightcraft Ltd and Kelowna Flightcraft Air Charter has the following aircraft registered with Transport Canada.

Kelowna Flightcraft fleet
Aircraft	In service	Variants	Notes
ATR 72	3	ATR 72-212A	Operated by Kelowna Flightcraft Air Charter Ltd.
Beechcraft Duke	1	Beechcraft A60	Operated by Kelowna Flightcraft Air Charter Ltd.
Beechcraft Premier I	2	Beechcraft 390	Operated by Kelowna Flightcraft Ltd
Boeing 737 Next Generation	2	737-600	Operated by Kelowna Flightcraft Air Charter Ltd.
Cessna 172	1	172M	Operated by Kelowna Flightcraft Ltd
Cessna 180 Skywagon	1	180	Operated by Kelowna Flightcraft Air CharterLtd.
Convair CV-240 family	4	Convair CV-580	Operated by Kelowna Flightcraft Air Charter Ltd.
Total	14		

=== Leasing ===
KF Cargo leases out Convairs, the CV-580 / CV-5800s. KF Cargo's leasing operations has the distinction of developing the world's first 300QC series of the Boeing 737 Classic.

The company has leased aircraft to several Canadian passenger airlines including Harmony Airways, Greyhound Air, Roots Air in the past and also in the United States to IFL Group Inc. Currently, KF Cargo leases its Boeing 737-300QC to Canadian North.

=== Historical fleet ===
The airline previously operated a diverse range of aircraft including:

- Aero Commander
- Beechcraft aircraft
- Bell 206
- Boeing 727-100F
- Boeing 727-200F
- Boeing 737-200
- Boeing 737-300
- Boeing 737-400SF
- Boeing 737-800
- Boeing 757-200
- Cessna aircraft
- Convair CV-340
- Convair CV-440
- Convair CV-580
- de Havilland Canada DHC-4 Caribou
- Douglas DC-3
- McDonnell Douglas DC-10-30F
- Fairchild F27
- Grumman Gulfstream I
- Helio Courier
- Howard 500
- Israel 1124
- Israel 1125
- Mitsubishi MU-2
- Piper Aircraft
- Robinson R44
- Taylorcraft DC65.

== Accidents and incidents ==
- On January 13, 1999, a Douglas DC-3 (C-GWUG) crashed into Mount Parke, Mayne Island while on a domestic cargo flight from Vancouver International Airport to Victoria International Airport. The aircraft was destroyed and both pilots, the only occupants, were killed. Investigation revealed that the flight was being operated under visual flight rules at night, in contravention of Canadian Aviation Regulations.
- On July 9, 1981, a Howard 500 (C-GKFN), operated by Kelowna Flightcraft for overnight freight operations, crashed shortly after takeoff from Toronto Pearson International Airport. Fatalities were three crew.

== Bases ==
Pilot bases include Kelowna International Airport, John C. Munro Hamilton International Airport, and Vancouver International Airport.

Primary maintenance bases include John C. Munro Hamilton International Airport and Kelowna International Airport with a satellite base at Vancouver International Airport.

== See also ==
- List of airlines of Canada
