= CFB Portage la Prairie =

Former air base in Manitoba, Canada

CFB Portage la Prairie/ RCAF Station Portage la Prairie
- Southport, Manitoba; Near Portage la Prairie, Manitoba in Canada

Site information
- Operator: Royal Canadian Air Force
- Controlled by: No. 2 Air Training Command (1940-

Location
- CFB Portage CFB Portage la Prairie (Canada)
- Coordinates: 49°55′N 098°17′W

Site history
- In use: 1940-45; 1950-92

Airfield information
- Elevation: 863 ft (263 m) AMSL
Runways
Direction	Length and surface
8/26	3,040 ft (930 m) hard surface
12/30	3,040 ft (930 m) hard surface
1/19	2,760 ft (840 m) hard surface

Canadian Forces Base Portage la Prairie Portage la Prairie/Southport Airport
- IATA: none; ICAO: none

Summary
- Airport type: ~~Military~~
- Owner: Canadian Forces Air Command
- Location: RM of Portage la Prairie, near Portage la Prairie, Manitoba
- Time zone: CST (UTC−06:00)
  - Summer (DST): CDT (UTC−05:00)
- Elevation AMSL: 885 ft (270 m)

Map
- Location in Manitoba CFB Portage la Prairie (Canada)

Runways
Direction	Length		Surface
Direction	ft	m	Surface
~~01/19~~	~~3,045~~	~~928~~	~~Asphalt~~
~~08/26~~	~~2,670~~	~~810~~	~~Asphalt~~
~~13R/31L~~	~~7,000~~	~~2,134~~	~~Asphalt~~
~~13L/31R~~	~~3,130~~	~~954~~	~~Asphalt~~

Helipads
Number	Length		Surface
Number	ft	m	Surface
~~H1~~	~~150~~	~~46~~	Turf/snow
~~H2~~	~~100~~	~~31~~	~~Turf/snow~~
- Source: Canada Flight Supplement; Environment Canada

Canadian Forces Base Portage la Prairie is a former military airport of the Royal Canadian Air Force (RCAF) located adjacent to Portage la Prairie, Manitoba, Canada. Today the airport is operated as Portage la Prairie/Southport Airport.

== History ==
=== World War II ===
RCAF Station Portage la Prairie was originally slated to open on 28 October 1940 and was to be the home station of No. 14 Elementary Flying Training School (EFTS). However, due to construction delays of the school from moving into the nearly completed aerodrome, it was decided that the school would be established at Stevenson Field in Winnipeg, Manitoba. From 28 October 1940 until 4 December 1940 the school operated out of the Winnipeg Aerodrome. The majority of EFTS were operated by civilian flying clubs and No. 14 EFTS was no different. Contract for the operation of this school was issued to Central Manitoba Flying Training School Limited, a company created under a charter issued to the Winnipeg Flying Club.

The school was initially tasked to start a pilot training course every month with the course slated to last two months. Each course was loaded with 24 students; however, by the time they commenced training, this increased to 35 students per course.

Training at this school was to be conducted using 25 RCAF provided de Havilland Tiger Moth training aircraft.

The school operated until July 1942 when it was disbanded to allow No.7 Air Observer School, which was also stationed at the base, to expand.

The station was a part of the British Commonwealth Air Training Plan.

The station was home to No.7 Air Observer School from 28 April 1941 to 31 March 1945.

When the Air Observer School's size was increased in the spring of 1942, No.14 EFTS was disbanded to make room. The station was closed on 31 March 1945.

==== Aerodrome data ====
In approximately 1942 the aerodrome was listed at 49°55′N 98°17′W with a variation of 11 degrees east and elevation of 863 ft (263 m). Three runways were listed as follows:

Runway name	Length	Width	Surface
8/26	3,040 ft (930 m)	150 ft (46 m)	Hard surfaced
12/30	3,040 ft (930 m)	150 ft (46 m)	Hard surfaced
1/19	2,760 ft (840 m)	150 ft (46 m)	Hard surfaced

=== Cold War (1952–92) ===
The post-war expansion of the RCAF resulted in RCAF Station Portage la Prairie being re-activated on 15 September 1952. No. 2 Advanced Flying School (No. 2 AFS) was established to train RCAF and NATO pilots. Several other flight schools followed over the succeeding decades.

As a result of the unification of the Canadian Armed Forces, the station was renamed CFB Portage la Prairie in 1966.

In the late 1980s, Department of National Defence budget reductions led to the contracting out of flight training to civilian agencies. As a result, CFB Portage la Prairie closed on 1 September 1992.

=== Post-base closure (1992–) ===
It reopened as Southport Airport, where 3 Canadian Forces Flying Training School continues to conduct flight training under contract with KF Aerospace.

== See also ==
- List of airports in Manitoba
