= Howard 500 =

American executive transport aircraft

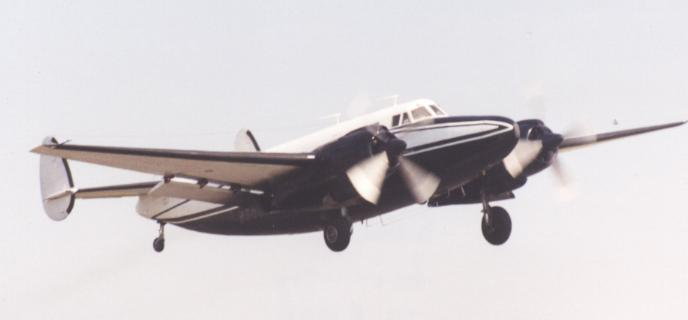
- Howard 500 N500LN demonstrating at Coventry airport, UK, in August 2000

General information
- Type: Executive aircraft
- National origin: United States
- Manufacturer: Howard Aero Incorporated
- Designer: Dee Howard (Note: Dee Howard and Howard Aero Inc. bear no relation to Ben Howard, racing pilot and aircraft company founder, nor to his company, Howard Aircraft Corporation.) and Ed Swearingen
- Number built: 22

History
- First flight: September 1959

The Howard 500 is an American executive transport aircraft produced by Howard Aero Incorporated during the early 1960s.

== Design and development ==
During the 1950s and '60s, Howard Aero Inc., led by Durrell U. "Dee" Howard, had been remanufacturing military surplus Lockheed Lodestars and Lockheed Venturas for the executive market. Conversions of multi-engine World War II warplanes into business aircraft were popular at the time, and Howard came to prefer Lockheed designs, as he found heavy transports such as the C-47 to be too slow and light bombers such as the Douglas A-26 lacking in interior space.

While the Howard 500 bears a strong resemblance to the Lodestar and Ventura, it is a substantially new design with a completely new fuselage designed from the outset for pressurization, unlike those of its Lockheed forebears. The only major components taken directly from the Lockheeds were the outer wing panels (from surplus Venturas) and undercarriage (from PV-2 Harpoons). Howard purchased wing and fuselage jigs from Lockheed to use as patterns for jigs for the new aircraft, while the wings were designed wet. The pressurization system maintained a differential of 46.5 kilopascals (6.75 psi) which was greater than any other prop or turboprop executive aircraft on the market at the time and maintained a sea level cabin pressure at up to 16,000 feet (4,900 m). The 500 is a luxurious aircraft with a spacious cabin, ample baggage capacity, a large door situated close to the ground for easy entry, and an onboard toilet.

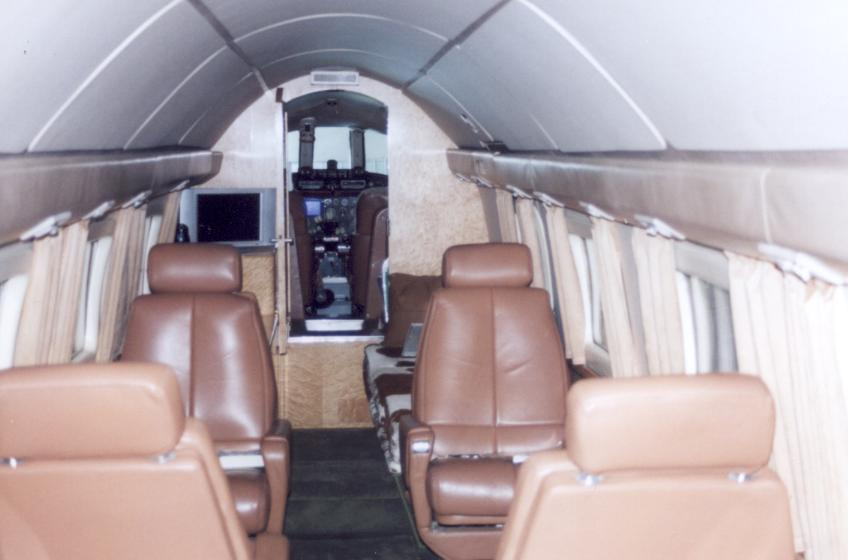
The spacious interior of N500HP, an executive Howard 500

The engine chosen was a new, higher-power and lighter-weight version of the Pratt & Whitney R-2800 that had been developed for the Douglas DC-6. Propeller hubs were taken from F4U Corsairs, four-blade propellers and spinners from DC-7s. The Howard 500 could accommodate 10 to 14 passengers with a large window for each. Increased fuel tankage over the PV-2 Ventura gave a maximum range with full reserves of 2,600 miles (4,200 km). Maximum cruising speed was 350 mph (300 kn; 560 km/h) at 21,000 feet (6,400 m).

The prototype flew in September 1959, and type certification was achieved on February 20, 1963. However, by the mid 1960s, turboprops and business jets with tricycle landing gear were being introduced by major manufacturers; while the Howard 500 compared favorably with these aircraft in terms of speed and range, it was an anachronistic taildragger with piston engines, resulting in limited sales.

Twenty-two Howard 500s were produced initially, with a further eight being converted from earlier PV-2s to virtually the same standard.

== Operators ==
Commercial firms operating the aircraft included: Republic Steel, Green Construction of Indiana, Nello L. Teer Company, KF Airlines, Pacific Petroleums of Canada, Northern Natural Gas Company and U.S. Metal Refining Company.

== Surviving aircraft ==
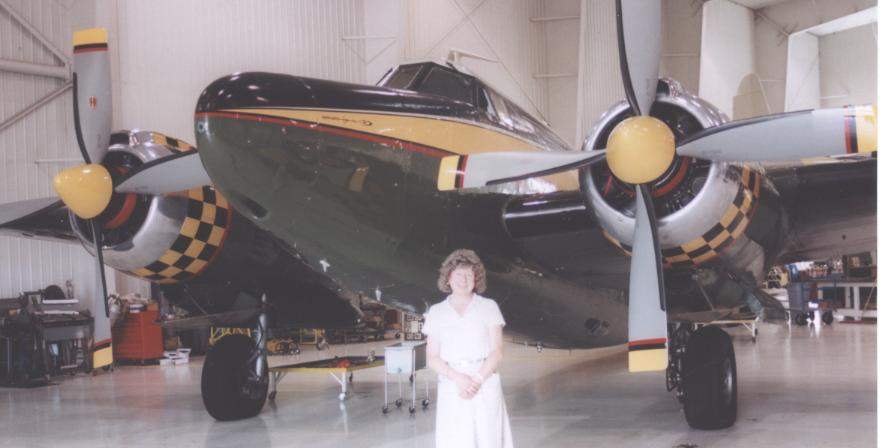
Operational Howard 500 N500HP of the Herrick Collection, based near Minneapolis MN in 2008

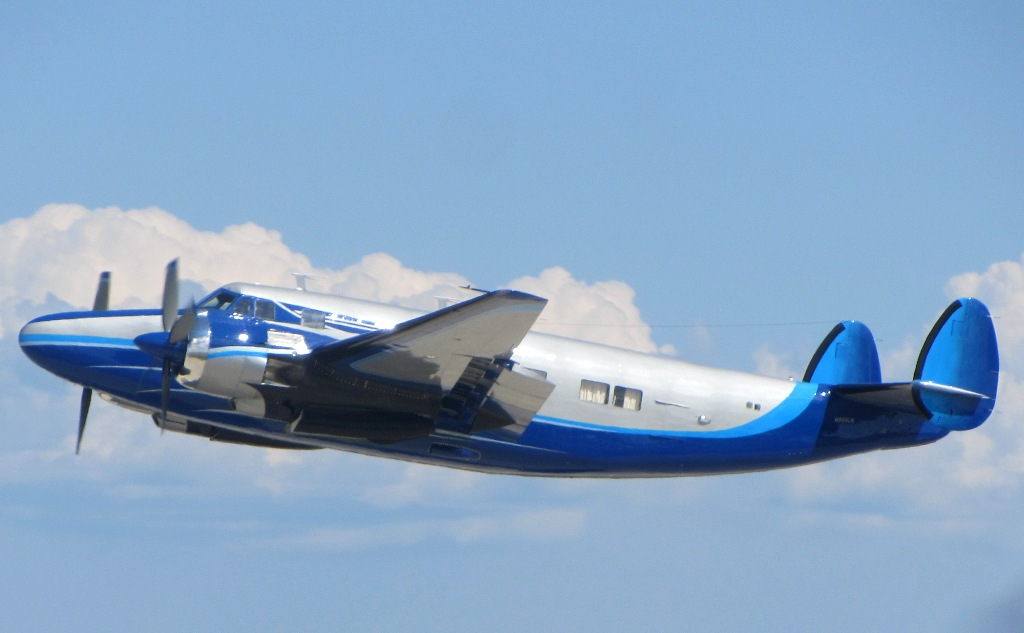
Howard 500 N500LN demonstrating at the EAA convention in 2013

Of the 17 examples built to the full Howard 500 standard, two restored aircraft remained flying in 2019: aircraft registration N500HP (serial number 500-105,) and N500LN, both owned by TP Aero and based in Anoka, Minnesota.

== Specifications ==
Data from Jane's All The World's Aircraft 1965-66

General characteristics

- Crew: 2
- Capacity: 10–14 passengers
- Length: 58 ft 5 1/2 in (17.818 m)
- Wingspan: 70 ft 4 in (21.44 m)
- Height: 13 ft 7 in (4.14 m)
- Wing area: 592.22 sq ft (55.019 m^{2})
- Aspect ratio: 8.35:1
- Empty weight: 23,000 lb (10,433 kg)
- Max takeoff weight: 35,000 lb (15,876 kg)
- Fuel capacity: 1,550 US gal (1,290 imp gal; 5,900 L)
- Powerplant: 2 × Pratt & Whitney R-2800-CB17 eighteen-cylinder two-row radial engines, 2,500 hp (1,900 kW) each
- Propellers: 4-bladed Hamilton-Standard 24E60-7037A-50 propellers

Performance

- Maximum speed: 410 mph (660 km/h, 360 kn) at sea level
- Cruise speed: 350 mph (560 km/h, 300 kn) at 21,000 ft (6,400 m) (econ.cruise)
- Stall speed: 103 mph (166 km/h, 90 kn)
- Never exceed speed: 450 mph (720 km/h, 390 kn)
- Range: 2,600 mi (4,200 km, 2,300 nmi)
- Service ceiling: 35,000 ft (11,000 m)
- Rate of climb: 2,550 ft/min (13.0 m/s)
- Takeoff distance to 50 ft (15 m): 2,412 ft (735 m)
- Landing distance from 50 ft (15 m): 3,575 ft (1,090 m)

== See also ==
Aircraft of comparable role, configuration, and era

- Howard Super Ventura
- On Mark Marksman
