= Portage la Prairie (disambiguation) =

Portage la Prairie is a small city in Manitoba, Canada.

Portage la Prairie may also refer to the following entities in Manitoba:

- Portage la Prairie (federal electoral district)
- Portage la Prairie (provincial electoral district)
- Portage la Prairie Airport (disambiguation)
- Rural Municipality of Portage la Prairie
