= Greyhound Air =

Canadian airline

- Founded: 1996
- Ceased operations: 1997
- Hubs: Winnipeg
- Focus cities: Calgary; Edmonton; Hamilton; Kelowna; Ottawa; Toronto; Vancouver
- Fleet size: 7
- Parent company: Greyhound Canada
- Headquarters: Calgary

Greyhound Air was a short-lived Canadian discount airline. Launched by Greyhound Canada, the airline ceased 14 months later in September 1997, when Laidlaw acquired the Canadian bus line.

== Proposal ==
Greyhound USA had suffered the incursion of the low-cost air offensive. In Canada, WestJet appeared increasingly threatening. Growth prospects depended upon luring more car users onto Greyhound buses and airplanes. The target market was leisure and cost-conscious travellers, who would typically drive between medium-sized Canadian cities. Theoretically, the existing Greyhound bus routes could seamlessly connect into air travel, providing a comprehensive yet affordable travel network. In late 1995, Greyhound announced its intention to launch a discount airline to complement its coach network.

== Operations ==
Kelowna Flightcraft, a cargo operator at the time based out of Kelowna, provided jet passenger aircraft and crew. However, because KF held the domestic airline licence, Greyhound could not legally display its name on the aircraft. The airline ran a notable ad campaign which featured a Greyhound dog lifting its leg to urinate against the wheel of an airplane. During September 1996, a price war erupted with competitors. Although Greyhound experienced load factors exceeding 80 per cent, it sustained a loss of $10M during the first five months of operation.

== Destinations ==
Flying out of its Winnipeg hub, scheduled flight destinations were:

- Calgary
- Edmonton
- Hamilton
- Kelowna
- Ottawa
- Toronto
- Vancouver

== Fleet ==
The fleet comprised seven Boeing 727-200s. The archaic 727s experienced high operating costs, requiring a third crew member in the cockpit and were also less fuel efficient than WestJet’s Boeing 737s.

== Shortcomings ==
Bypassing travel agents until April 1997, which sold 80 per cent of airline tickets at the time, automatically excluded a large passenger base. Logistically, weaving air service into the existing bus network was not only complex but impractical. The hub-and-spoke model through Winnipeg increased passenger travel time, offering a less appealing experience than a point-to-point system. Foreign ownership issues hampered obtaining a domestic airline licence, delaying the launch by several months and missing out on the lucrative early-summer traffic.
