= Portage la Prairie/Southport Airport =

Airport in Manitoba, Canada

Portage la Prairie/Southport Airport Canadian Forces Base Portage la Prairie
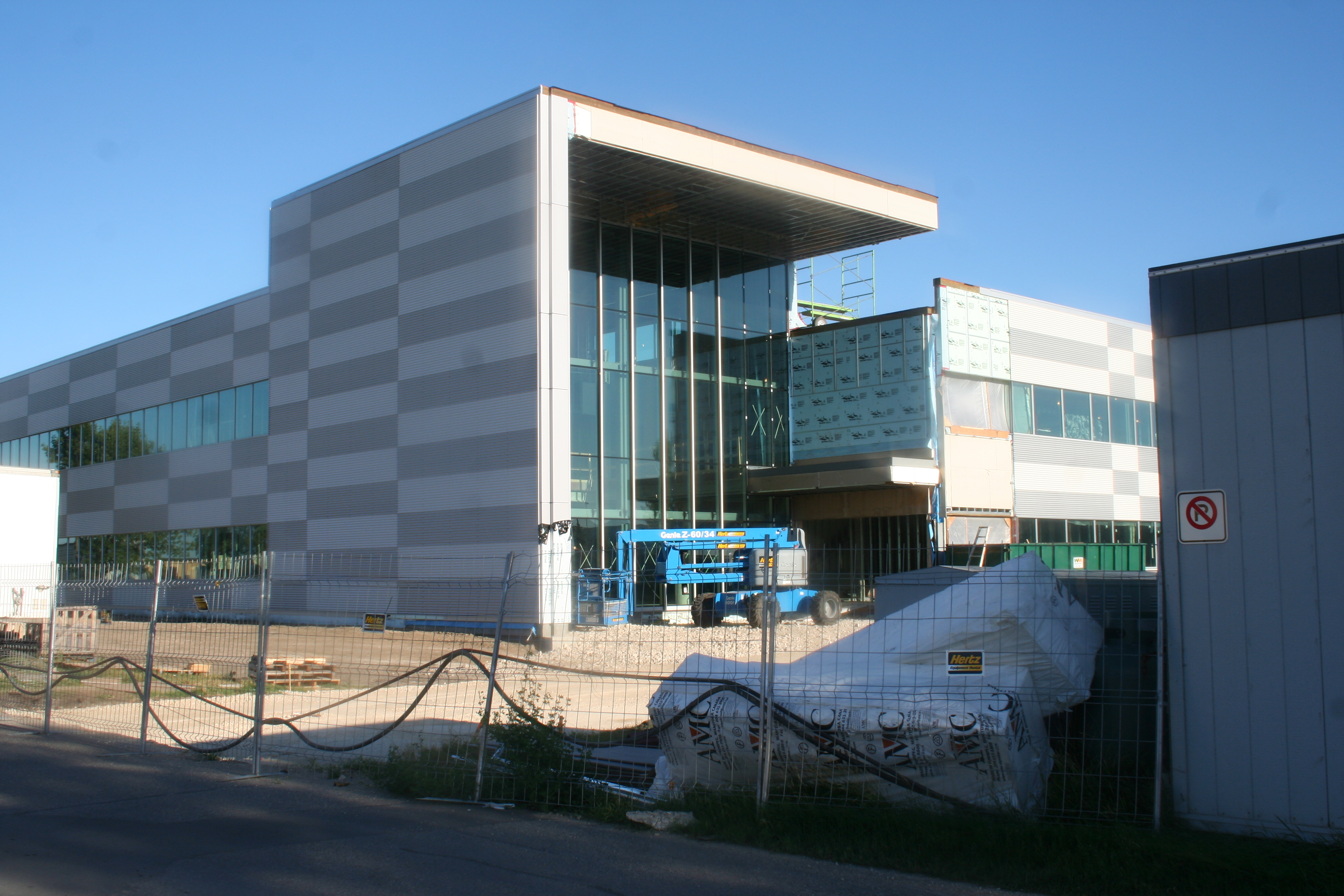
- KF Defence Programs Headquarters building under construction at Airport c. 2007
- IATA: YPG; ICAO: CYPG; WMO: 71851

Summary
- Airport type: Public
- Operator: Southport Aerospace Centre Inc.
- Location: RM of Portage la Prairie, near Portage la Prairie, Manitoba
- Time zone: CST (UTC−06:00)
  - Summer (DST): CDT (UTC−05:00)
- Elevation AMSL: 884 ft (269 m)
- Coordinates: 49°54′11″N 098°16′26″W

Map
- Location in Manitoba CYPG (Canada)

Runways
Direction	Length		Surface
Direction	ft	m	Surface
02/20	3,033	924	Asphalt
09/27	2,670	814	Asphalt
13R/31L	7,000	2,134	Asphalt
13L/31R	3,120	951	Asphalt

Helipads
Number	Length		Surface
Number	ft	m	Surface
H1	607 × 148	185 × 45	Grass / snow
H2	492 × 197	150 × 60	Grass / snow
H3	656 × 328	201 × 100	Grass / snow
- Source: Canada Flight Supplement; Environment Canada

Portage la Prairie/Southport Airport (IATA: YPG, ICAO: CYPG) is located adjacent to Portage la Prairie, Manitoba, Canada. It is operated by Southport Aerospace Centre Inc., a commercial-industrial centre. It was formerly Canadian Forces Base Portage la Prairie. It has been commercially operated since 1992.

The Aviation Training Centre operation of KF Defence Programs based at the airport. KF Defence Programs provides pilot training to the Royal Canadian Air Force and is a joint venture between KF Aerospace, Canadian Helicopters, Bluedrop, and Canadian Base Operators. 3 Canadian Forces Flying Training School is based at the airport.

== See also ==
- List of airports in Manitoba
- Portage la Prairie (North) Airport
