= Holland Landing Airpark =

Airport in Ontario, Canada

- IATA: none; ICAO: none; TC LID: CLA4

Summary
- Airport type: Private
- Operator: Holland Landing Airpark
- Location: Holland Landing, Ontario
- Time zone: EST (UTC−05:00)
  - Summer (DST): EDT (UTC−04:00)
- Elevation AMSL: 855 ft / 261 m
- Coordinates: 44°05′22″N 079°29′42″W

Map
- Location in Ontario CLA4 (Canada)

Runways
Direction	Length		Surface
Direction	ft	m	Surface
08/26	1,960	597	Asphalt
- Source: Canada Flight Supplement

Holland Landing Airpark (formerly Hare Field) (TC LID: CLA4) is located at the southern end of Holland Landing, Ontario, Canada. The airport is mainly used for training but tenants also offer charter, advertising and sightseeing services. The largest building is a 30,000 sq ft (2,800 m^{2}) hangar owned by Silverline Helicopters, while the smaller hangar belongs to Future Air.

The 40 acres (16 ha) private airfield has been considered as a potential home for York Regional Police Air2 helicopter.

The original 1,900 ft (580 m) grass strip was constructed by Wallace G. Hare in 1956, and a second, shorter 1,200 ft (370 m) runway was added shortly after. It served as a private airstrip for a handful of local pilots and at its peak, housed up to 20 private aircraft. In 1978, ultralights were becoming popular and two local ultralight companies established their businesses at Hare Field.

In 2006, Hare Field was sold to Silverline Helicopters and became known as Holland Landing Airpark.

== Tenant ==
Silverline Helicopters Inc. is a Canadian helicopter operator based in Holland Landing, at the Holland Landing Airpark (CLA4), Ontario Canada. Silverline Helicopters provides charter flights within areas including tourism, sightseeing, utility work, patrol, aerial firefighting and helicopter training. Silverline was established in 1999 to provide flight training with a Schweitzer 300B. It later expanded to provide helicopter charters.

On 18 April 2002, a Schweizer 269C helicopter operated by Silverline Helicopters was substantially damaged in an accident during a training flight at Holland Landing Airpark. The accident was caused when an instructor and student pilot failed to carry out the proper procedure for a practice autorotation emergency landing. The pair suffered only minor injuries.
