= KF Aerospace =

Canadian aerospace company

- Industry: Aerospace, Defence
- Founded: Kelowna, British Columbia, Canada (1970) by Barry Lapointe
- Number of locations: Vancouver, BC, Kelowna, BC, Calgary, AB, Portage La Prairie, MB, Hamilton, ON, Ottawa, ON
- Products: Aircraft
- Number of employees: 1200
- Subsidiaries: KF Capital, Kelowna Flightcraft Ltd., Kelowna Flightcraft Air Charter Ltd., Allied Wings, Regency Aero Leasing, SkyAlyne (partnership with CAE, Inc.)
- Website: KF Aerospace

KF Aerospace is a Canadian aerospace company providing aircraft maintenance, engineering, training, parts manufacturing, commercial flight operations, and pilot training. KF is a Transport Canada Design Approval Organization (DAO) and Recognized Design Approval Organization (RDAO) with the Department of National Defence (DND). KF also purchases, modifies and leases or sells commercial aircraft. KF Aerospace is the central Okanagan’s largest private sector employer and Canada’s largest commercial MRO.

Kelowna Flightcraft Ltd. (KFL) – a division of KF Aerospace – is an Approved Maintenance Organization (AMO) and operates two maintenance, repair and overhaul (MRO) facilities in Canada, one at Kelowna International Airport in British Columbia and the other at Hamilton International Airport in Ontario. KFL also holds delegated Engineering authorities under TC Transport Canada (TC) and the Department of National Defence (DND), and is an Approved Training Organization (ATO) under DND.

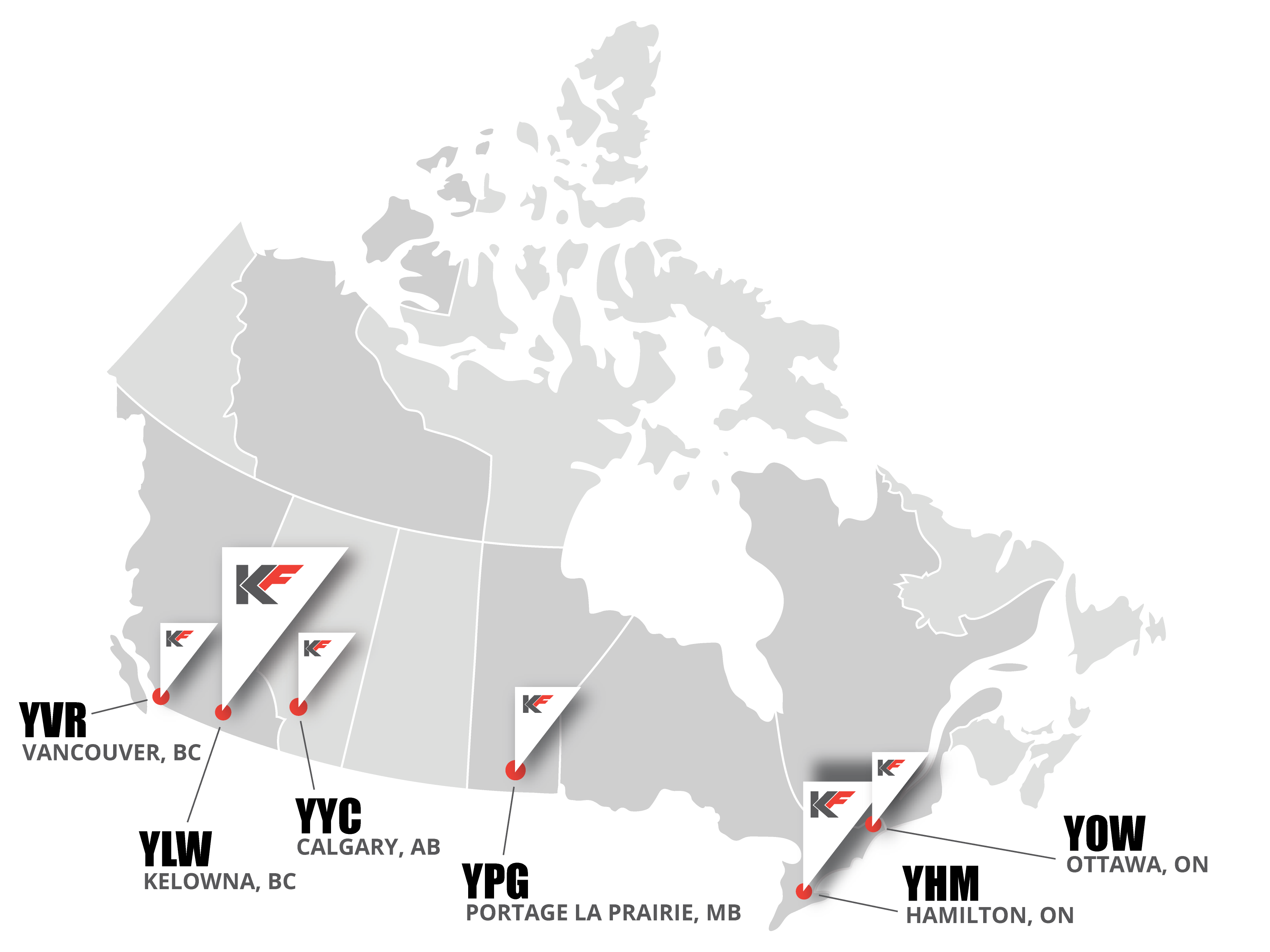
Map of KF Aerospace’s locations

KF Aerospace is the parent company of KF Defence Programs/Allied Wings Inc. and contract operator of the Canadian Forces Contracted Flying Training and Support program.

Kelowna Flightcraft Air Charter Ltd. (KFACL) provides charter passenger and charter cargo services.

Regency Aero Lease Inc. (RALI) provides aircraft leasing to KF Aerospace’s domestic and international customers.

== History ==
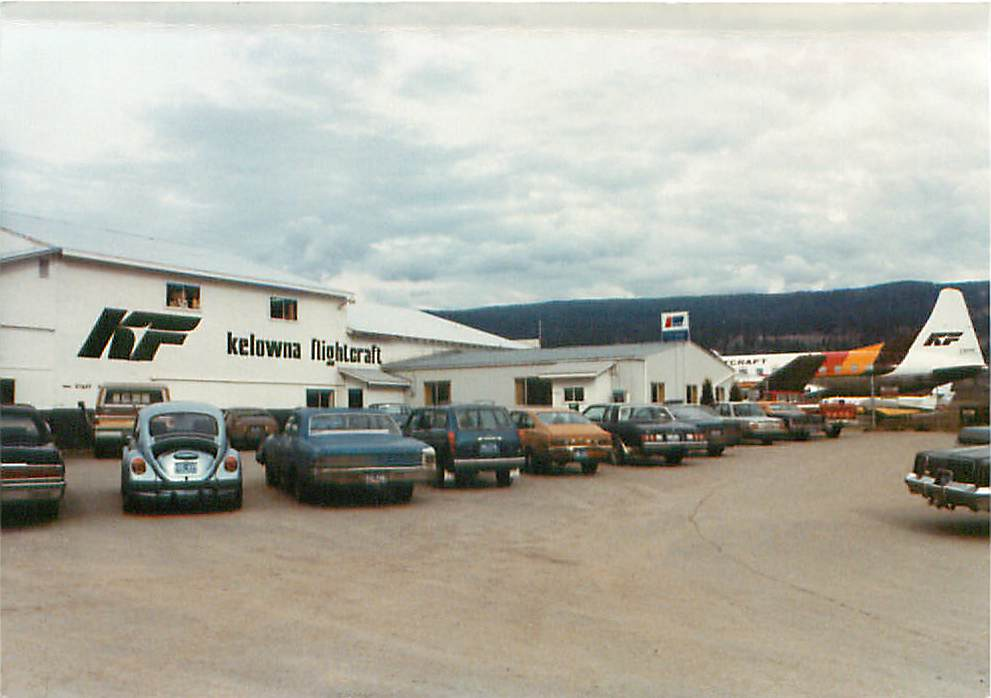
KF Aerospace c. 1970s

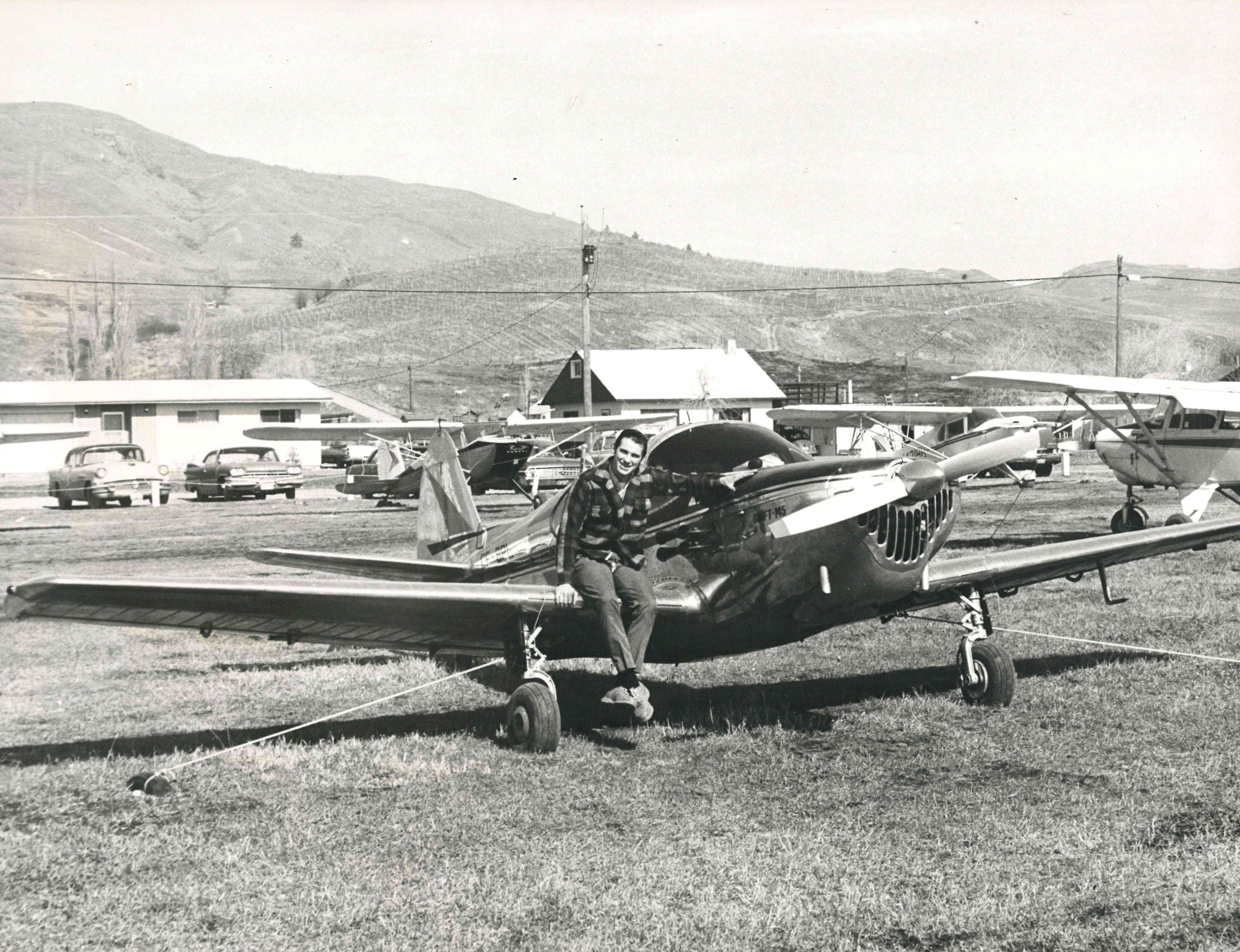
Barry Lapointe c. 1968

The company was established as Kelowna Flightcraft on March 20, 1970 in the Okanagan Valley by owner Barry Lapointe, and the charter subsidiary Kelowna Flightcraft Air Charter was established and started operating in June 1974.

In 1996, Kelowna Flightcraft was operating Boeing 727-200 jets in scheduled passenger airline service using its own "KF" airline code on a contract basis for Greyhound Air, a Canadian-based new startup air carrier.

KF's extensive history in maintenance work directed to the ubiquitous Boeing 727 "feederliner" series has led to their adaptation as the main type for cargo operations, with Purolator Courier their main client. It was announced on February 19, 2014 that Flightcraft lost their contract with Purolator Courier as another carrier, Cargojet, won the contract.

KF Aerospace currently delivers cargo for Purolator within British Columbia, Canada, as part of the British Columbia Feeder Network (BCFN) using a fleet of Convair 580 aircraft. KF provides Type-A dispatch services for Canadian operators.

On March 30, 2005, KF Aerospace was awarded a $1.77 billion contract to lead a team of Canadian companies called Allied Wings to provide primary flight training for the Royal Canadian Air Force at Southport Aerospace Centre Inc. - the former CFB Base in Portage la Prairie, Manitoba. Since 2005, KF Aerospace and its Allied Wings partners have provided basic and advanced flying training (multi-engine and rotary-wing) for RCAF pilots and aircrew. Training includes live flying on the Grob-G120A, King Air C-90B, Bell B206B Jet Ranger and Bell B412 CF Outlaw. Allied Wings also provides classroom and simulator instruction alongside RCAF uniformed instructors, and manages all facilities, grounds and operations for the program.

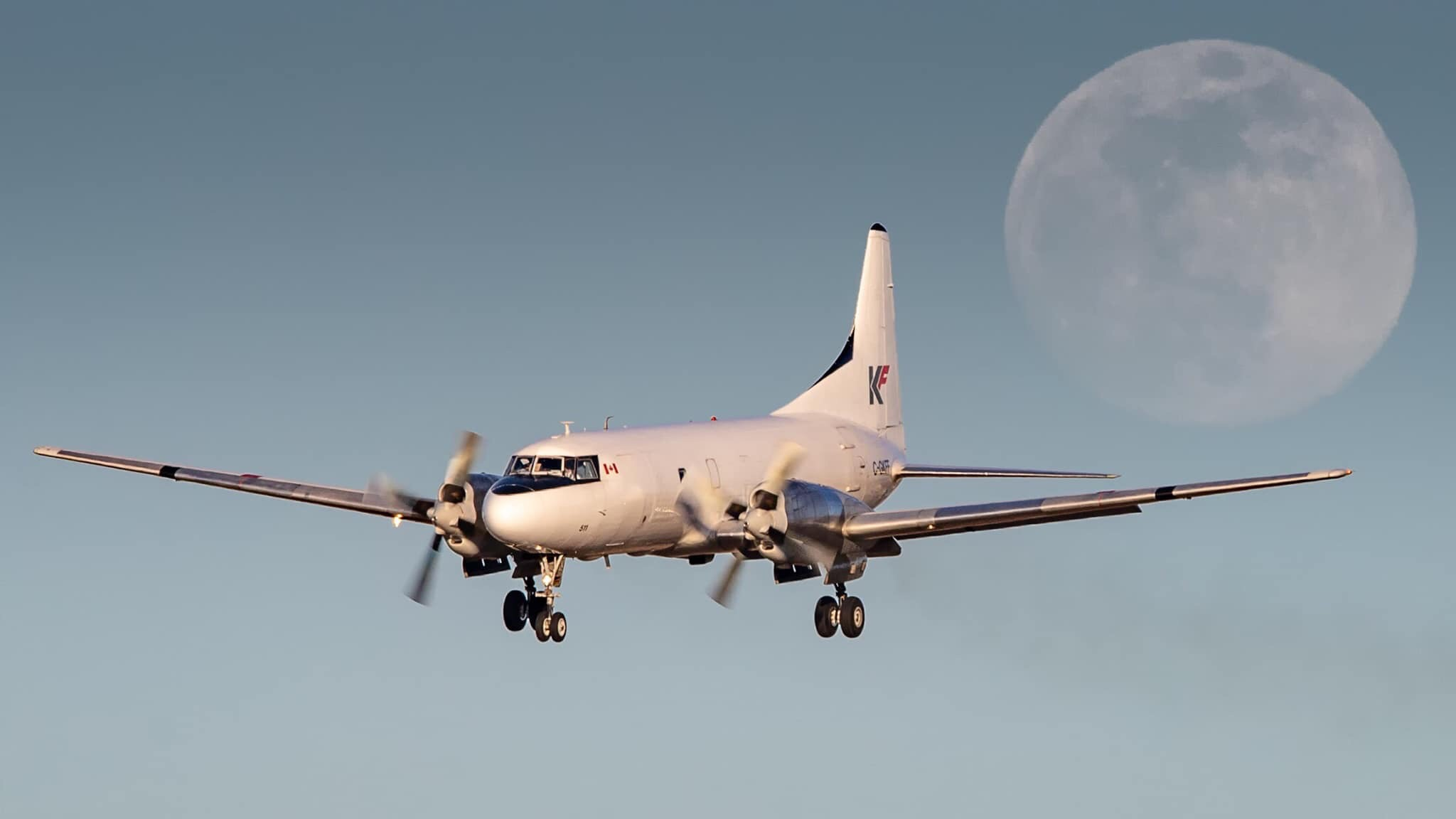
A Convair CV580 in KF's cargo fleet

KF Aerospace undertakes maintenance and upgrades on the Convair CV-240 family, for which it owns the type certificate. KF Aerospace has converted existing Convair CV-580s to the updated CV5800 configuration and had provided conversions of the former Canadian Forces CC-109 Cosmopolitan transport fleet into freighters and "fire-fighting" water/chemical bombers.

In February 2019, KF announced plans for a $30 million expansion of its MRO facility in Hamilton, Ontario, including a new 75,000 sq. foot hangar that introduced wide-body aircraft capability and additional lines of maintenance to KF’s Hamilton operation. The expansion was completed in November 2019.

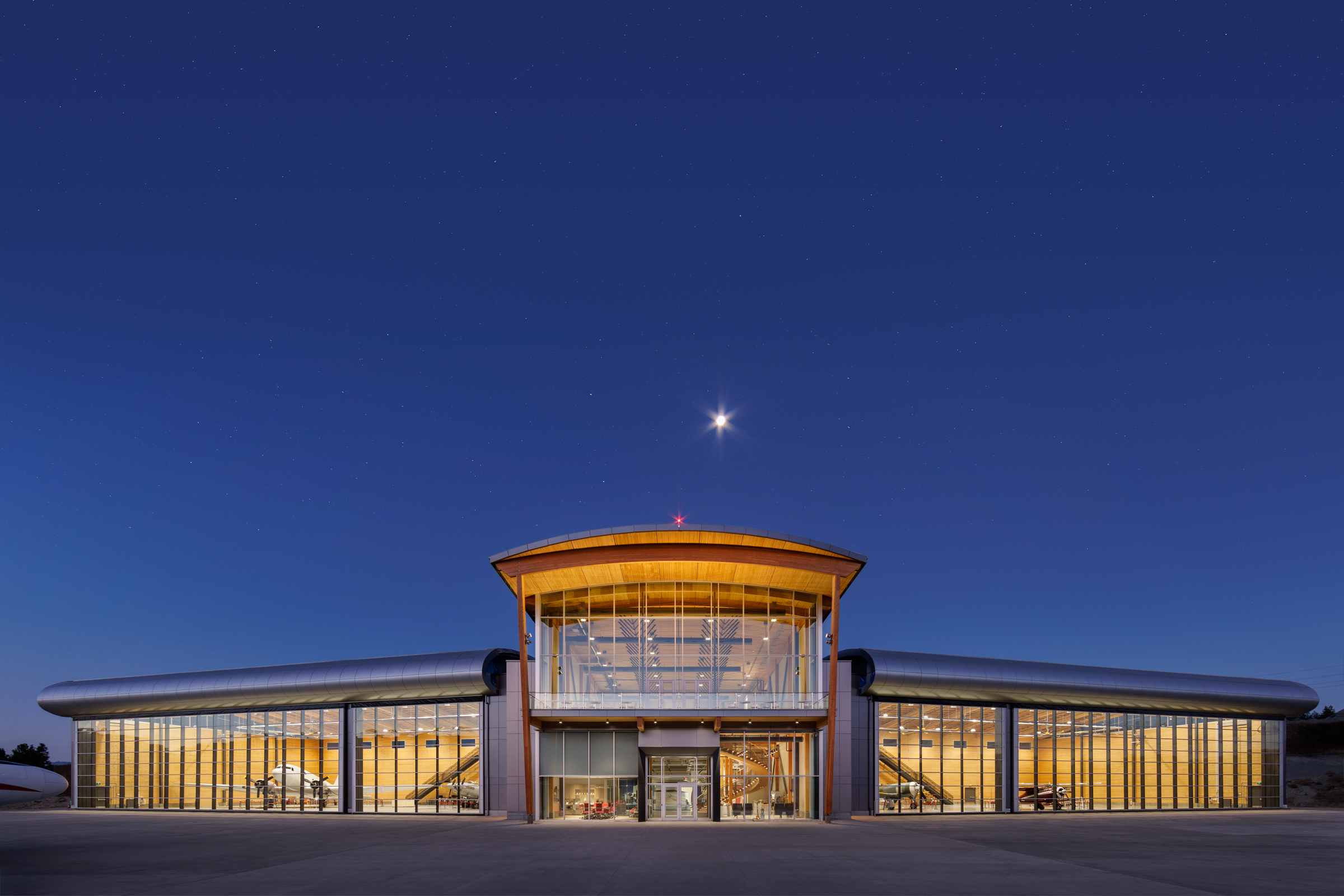
The KF Centre for Excellence

In September 2020, KF Aerospace founder Barry Lapointe announced plans to build an aerospace museum, hangar and conference center in Kelowna. The KF Centre for Excellence is a 50,000 sqft facility designed by Meiklejohn Architects and built by Sawchuk Developments Co. Completed and opened in 2022, it is shaped like a plane and features a mass timber and steel design. The two hangars house legacy aircraft such as a World War II Mosquito fighter-bomber and a Hawker Tempest MKII. KF launched the passenger charter airline Aeroflyer in 2022, operating with a fleet of Boeing 737NG aircraft.

In 2022, KF Aerospace partnered with the City of Kelowna, Kelowna International Airport (YLW), and the YMCA to build the Kelowna Airport YMCA Child Care Centre. The child care centre opened in 2023, offering spaces for 86 children under age six. In 2024, an expansion for the child care centre was announced. The expansion is expected to open in late 2025.

KF Aerospace announced a partnership with Boeing to open two conversion lines for 737-800BCF at its Kelowna facility in 2023.

== Operations ==
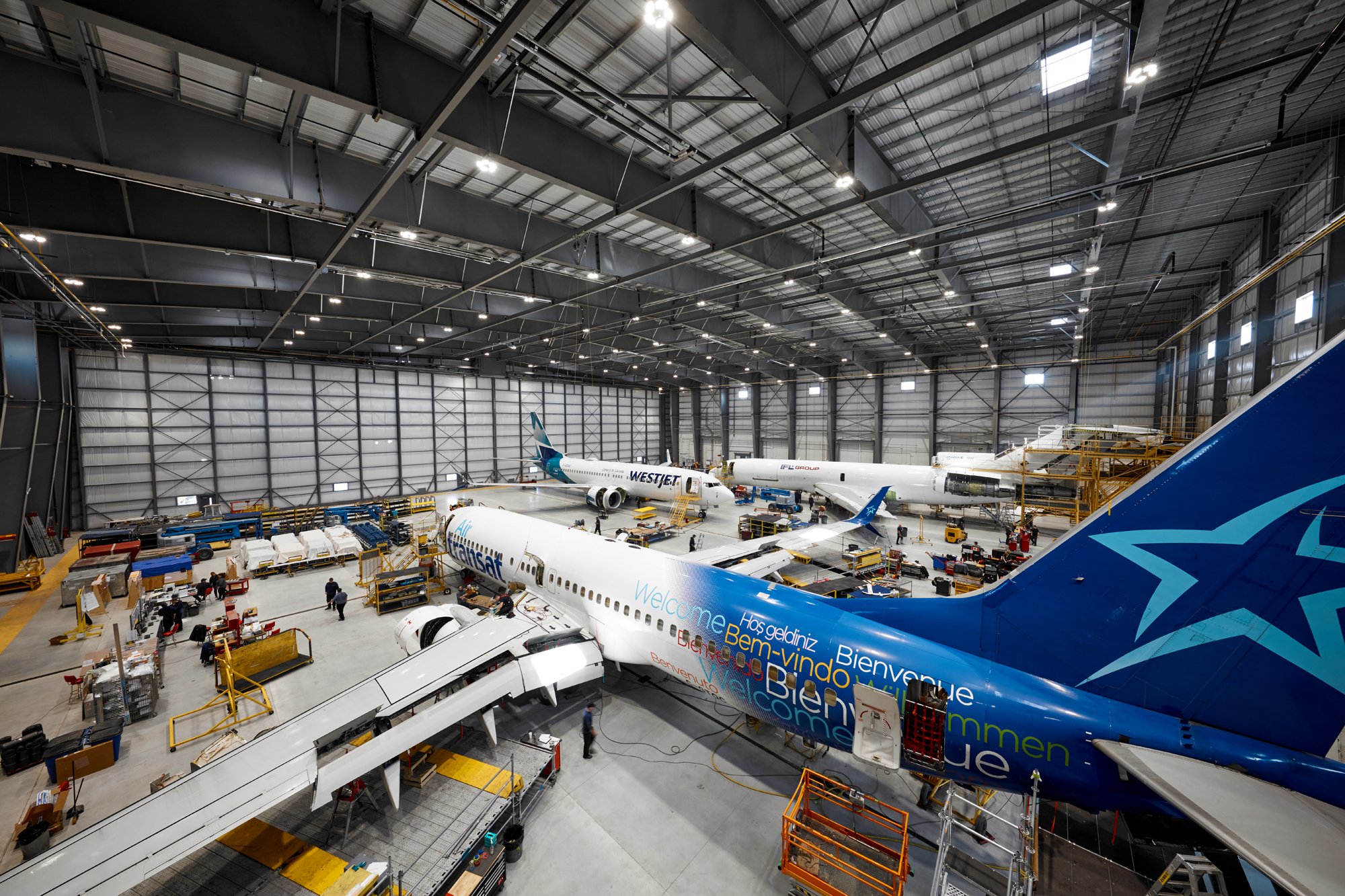
The wide-body hangar at KF Aerospace’s Hamilton location

KF Aerospace is Canada’s largest commercial Maintenance, Repair, and Overhaul (MRO) provider, with 15 maintenance lines across Canada completing over 1,100, 000 maintenance hours annually. KF Aerospace offers services in aerospace engineering, shops and manufacturing, engine repair and overhaul, avionics, composite repair and overhaul, landing gear, plating, non-destructive testing (NDT), painting, modifications, parts, heavy maintenance, line maintenance, and mobile repair. KF has over 200 Supplemental Type Certificates (STCs) and repair approvals.

KF Aerospace specializes in passenger to freighter conversions for the Convair 580, Boeing 737-300, 400, & 800, and ATR 72-500, and maintenance and modifications for the Boeing 727, 737, 757, and 767; Airbus A320 support; Lockheed 100-J Hercules; De Havilland Canada Dash 8-Q400; and ATR.

== KF Defence and SkyAlyne ==
KF Aerospace is a prime contractor at the Contracted Flying and Training Support (CFTS) Program in Southport, MB, providing pilot training and in-service support for the Royal Canadian Air Force (RCAF) with its partners in Allied Wings. Over 80% of RCAF pilots earn their ‘wings’ through the CFTS Program. At YPG, KF directly maintains Grob 120A training aircraft and Textron/Beechcraft King Air C-90 aircraft. At YLW, KF provides comprehensive maintenance services for the CC138 Twin Otter Transport Squadron.

KF provides Fixed-Wing Search and Rescue (FWSAR) maintenance for the Department of National Defence. KF is a member of Team Poseidon for Canadian Multi-Mission Aircraft (CMAA), slated to provide ongoing maintenance and engineering support for the P-8A Poseidon.

KF is a founding partner of SkyAlyne (along with Canadian company CAE) to provide aircrew training and in-service support for the RCAF’s Future Aircrew Training (FAcT) Program. In May 2024, SkyAlyne was awarded the 20+ year, multi-billion-dollar FAcT contract.

== College Partnerships ==
KF has partnerships with local colleges at two of its bases: Okanagan College (Kelowna, BC), Mohawk College (Hamilton, Ontario). Each of these college programs offers on-site AME training programs.

In 2021, KF Aerospace partnered with Mohawk College to build the Centre for Aviation Technology – a three story, 75,000-square-foot aviation jobs and skills training facility adjoined to KF Aerospace’s Hamilton MRO facility.

== Locations ==
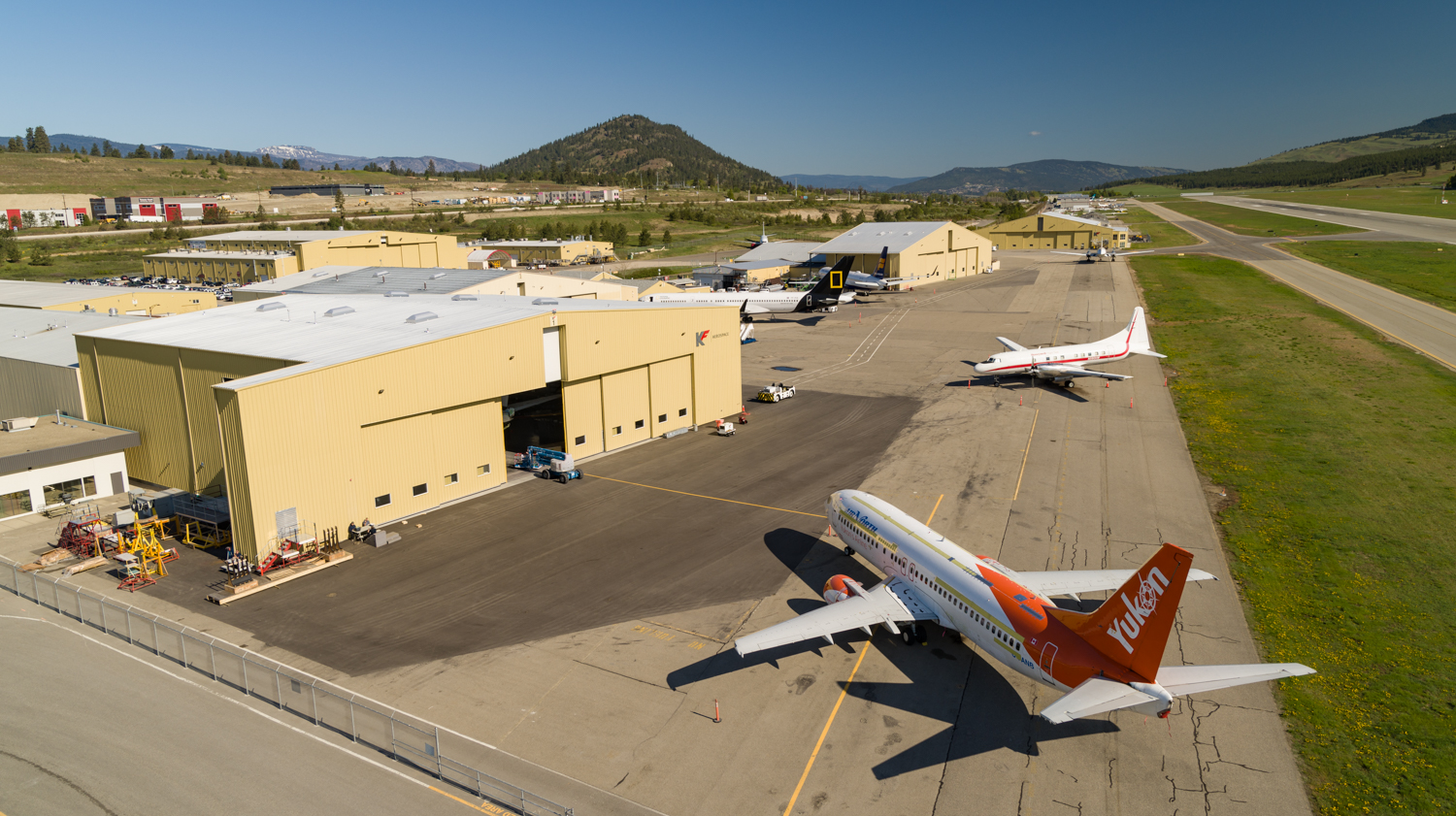
KF’s Kelowna base

KF Aerospace has hangar facilities in Kelowna, BC and Hamilton, ON, and four operational sites in Vancouver, BC, Calgary, AB, Portage La Prairie, MB, and Ottawa, ON. KF’s head office, main MRO and Flight Ops are located in Kelowna.

== Customers ==
KF Aerospace’s customers include the following:

- Boeing
- WestJet
- Department of National Defence
- Royal Canadian Air Force
- Air Canada
- Purolator
- Omni Air International
- Lynden Air Cargo
- Icelandair
- Air North
- Air Transat
- Flair Airlines
- Sunwing Airlines
- Air Inuit

== Accreditations ==
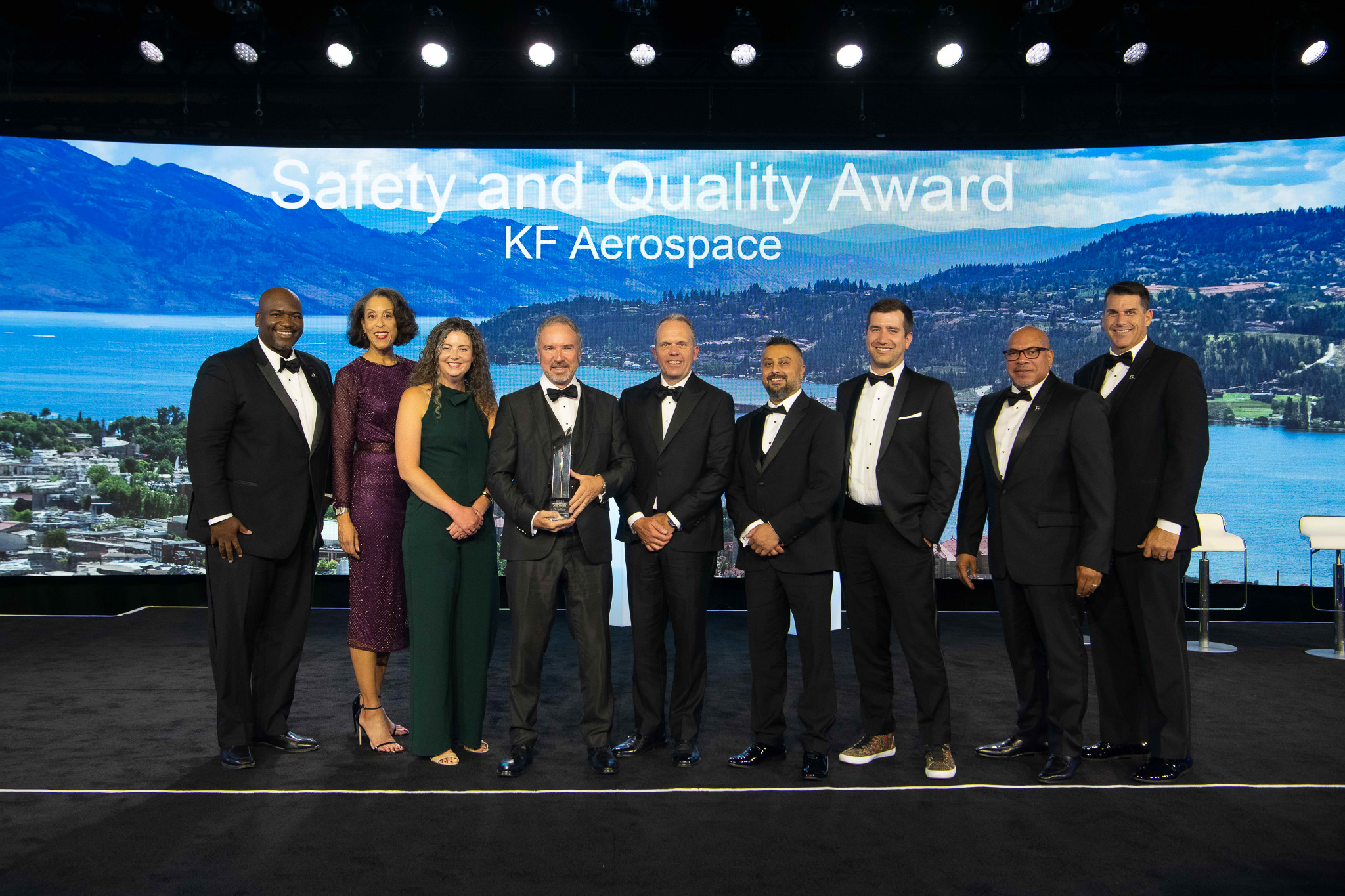
KF Aerospace winning the 2023 Safety and Quality Award at the Boeing Company’s 2023 Supplier of the Year event

KF Aerospace has the following accreditations:

- KF Air Charter Limited Air Operating Certificate (AOC)
- Approved Maintenance Organization (AMO)
- Transport Canada Design Approval Organization (DAO) and Department of Defence Recognized-DAO
- Convair 240, 340, 440 Type-Certificate Holder (TCH)
- Facility Security Clearance to Secret
- Controlled Goods Program Certificate
- Dangerous Goods Approval – Cargo Aircraft
- Department of Defence Recognized Design Approval Organization (RDOA)
- Transport Canada Approved Training Organization (ATO)
- Transport Canada Approved Manufacturing Organization (AMfgO)

== Aircraft ==
KF offers leasing of the following aircraft types:

- Boeing 737 300/400/800
- ATR 42/72
- Boeing 727
- Convair 580/5800

KF offers international leasing through Knight Aircraft Leasing. KF has an exclusive dealership arrangement to sell, market, and lease Grob products in North America.

KF offers maintenance for the following aircraft types:

- Boeing 727 100/200
- Boeing 737 100/200 300/400/500 600 /700/800/900 Max
- Boeing 757 200/300
- Boeing 767 200/300/300ER
- Airbus A300
- Airbus A310
- Airbus A319/A320/A321
- Bombardier CRJ100/200
- de Havilland Canada DHC-8 Dash 8
- Embraer E-Jet
- McDonnell Douglas DC-10
- Douglas DC-3/4/6/8/9
- McDonnell Douglas MD-80
- Lockheed L382
- Convair 580
- ATR42
- ATR72
- Beechcraft Premier
- Beechcraft King Air
