= KF Defence Programs =

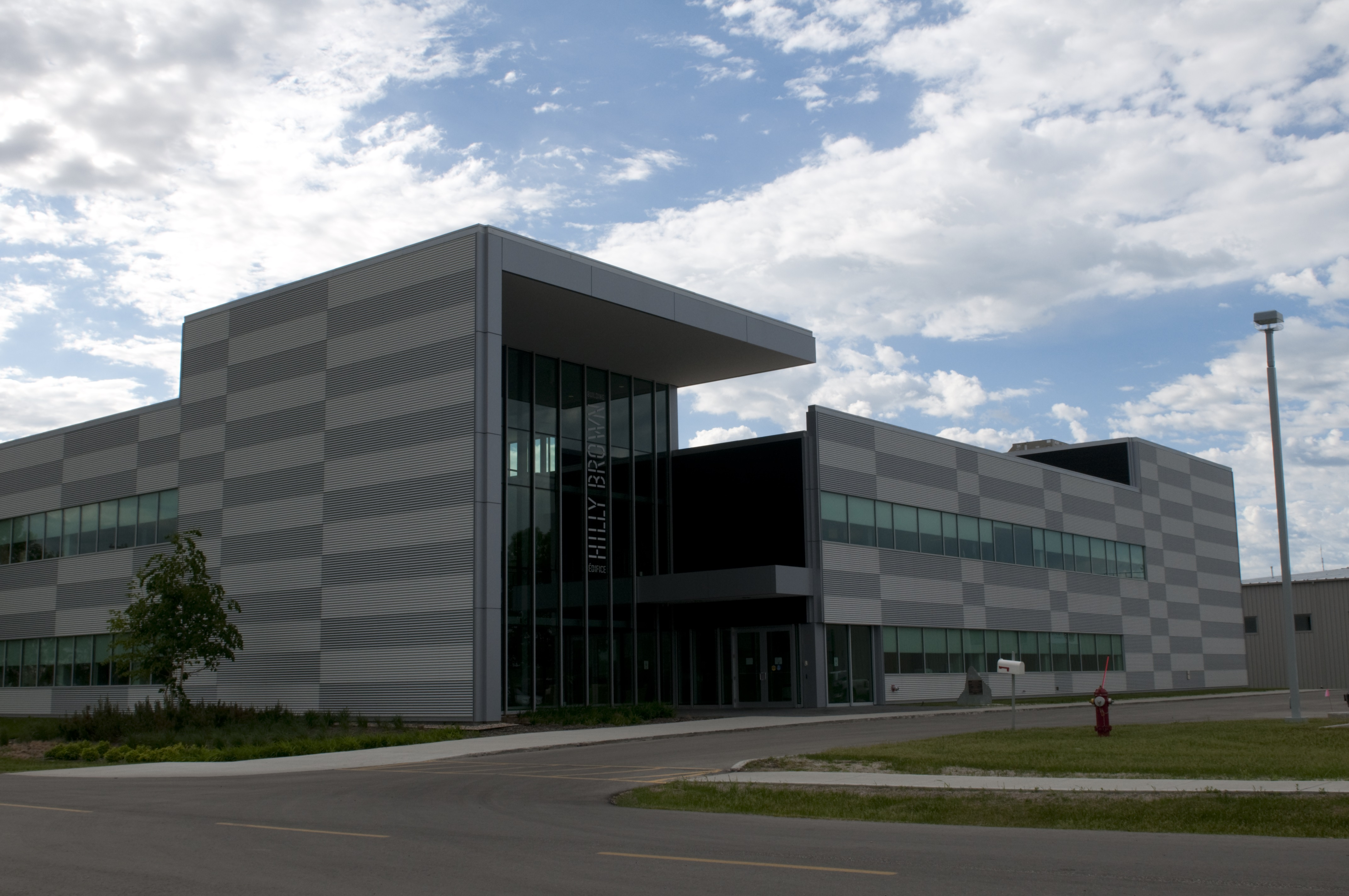
Hilly Brown Building

KF Defence Programs, a division of KF Aerospace, operates the Contracted Flying Training and Support (CFTS) Training Centre located at Portage la Prairie/Southport Airport in Southport, Manitoba, Canada. KF Aerospace leads a joint partnership that includes Canadian Helicopters, Bluedrop Performance Learning, and Canadian Base Operators. The main building is named The Hilly Brown Building after Wing Commander Mark Henry Brown who was the first Canadian flying ace of the Second World War.

The 22-year contract was announced on 27 October 2005 by the Minister of National Defence to provide flying training support at 3 Canadian Forces Flying Training School.

Through the partnership, it provides aircraft and training services to the Royal Canadian Air Force for training pilots and air navigators.

== Training services ==
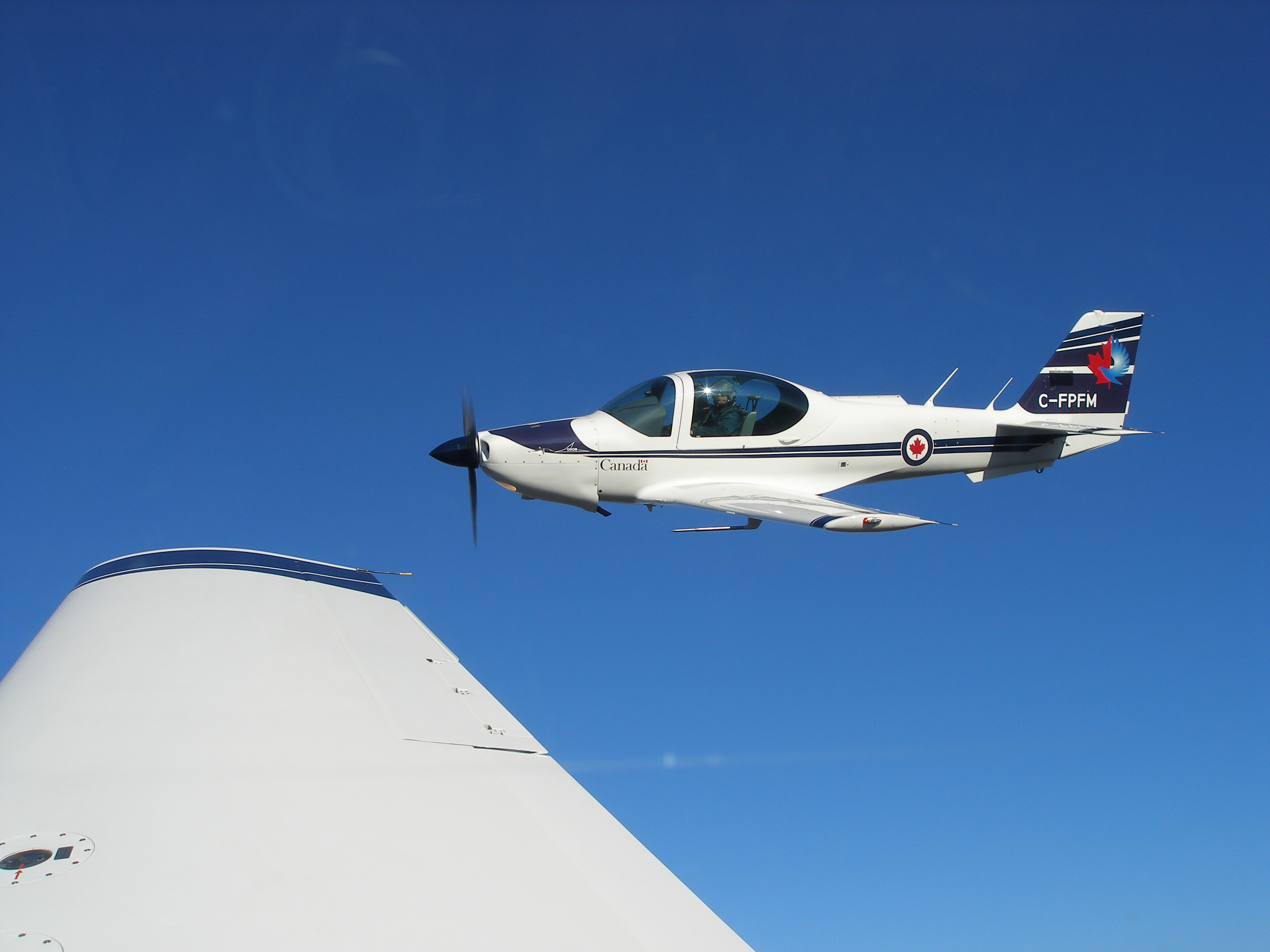
Grob G120A CFTS

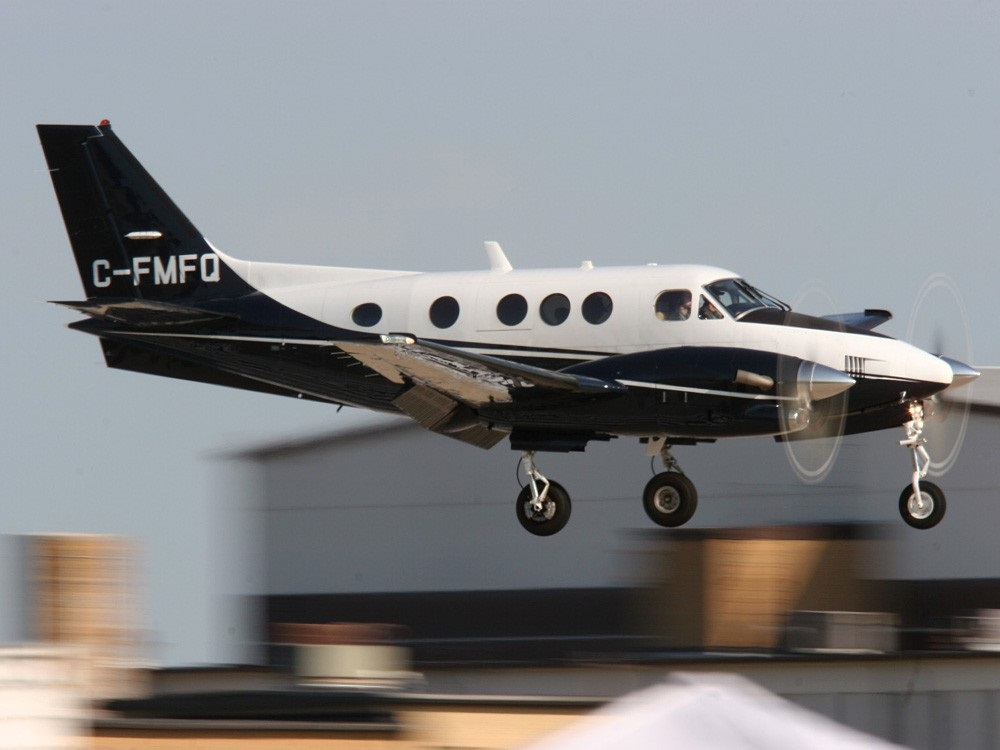
C90B King Air CFTS

Phase I - Primary Flying Training

The contractor provides the aircraft, flying instructors, facilities, accommodations and courseware for the 1st phase of pilot training in Canada. This training includes both classroom instruction along with basic flight training on the Grob G120A.

Phase II (Grob) - Basic Flying Training

The contractor provides the aircraft, flying instructors, facilities, accommodations and courseware. Basic Flight training provided on the Grob G120A. This course is planned as an alternative to Basic Flying Training at CFB Moose Jaw, Saskatchewan.

Phase III - Advanced Flying Training Multi-Engine

The contractor provides the aircraft, facilities, accommodations and courseware. The RCAF provides the instructor pilots for training students on the King Air C90B.

Phase III - Advanced Flying Training Helicopter

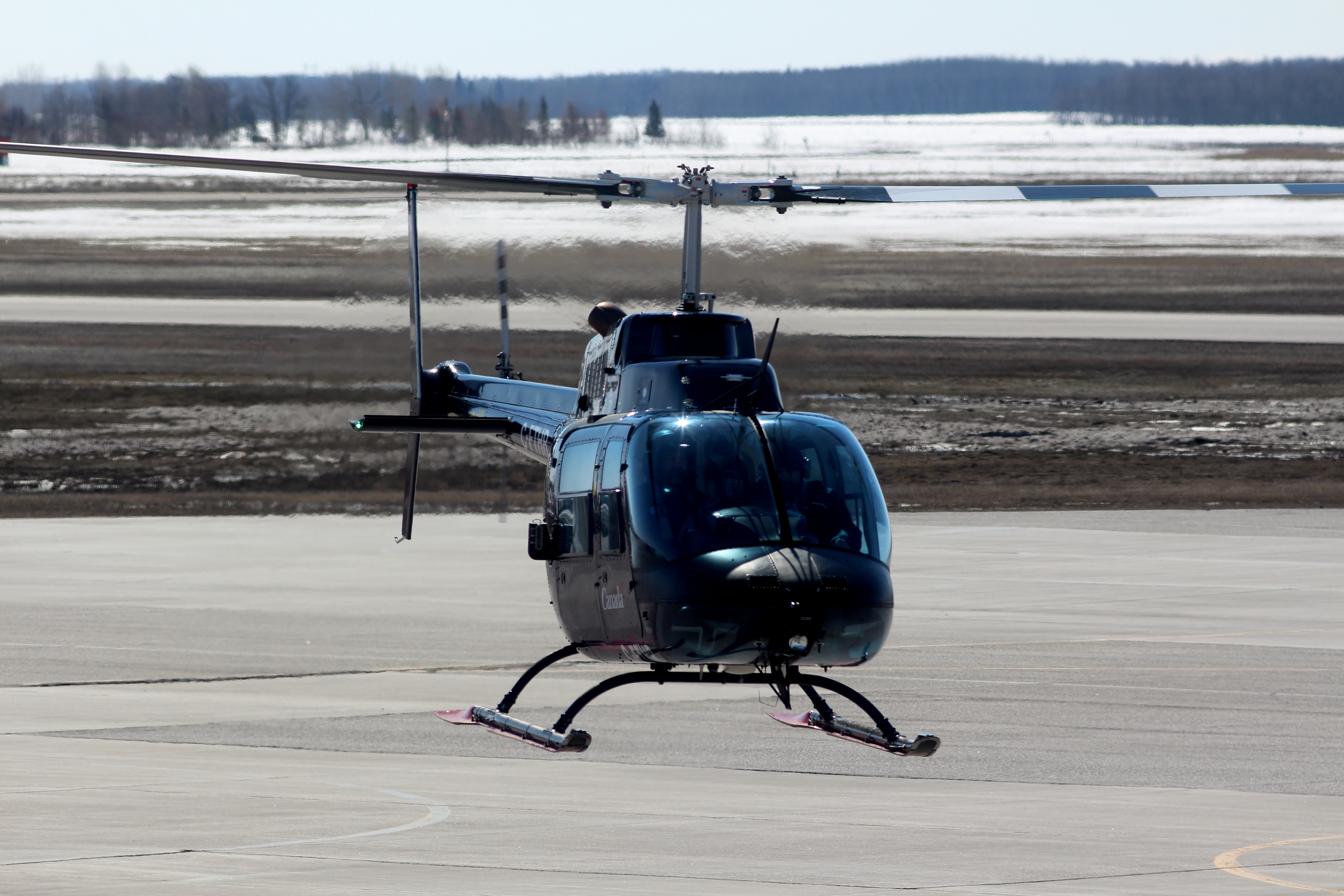
B206 CFTS

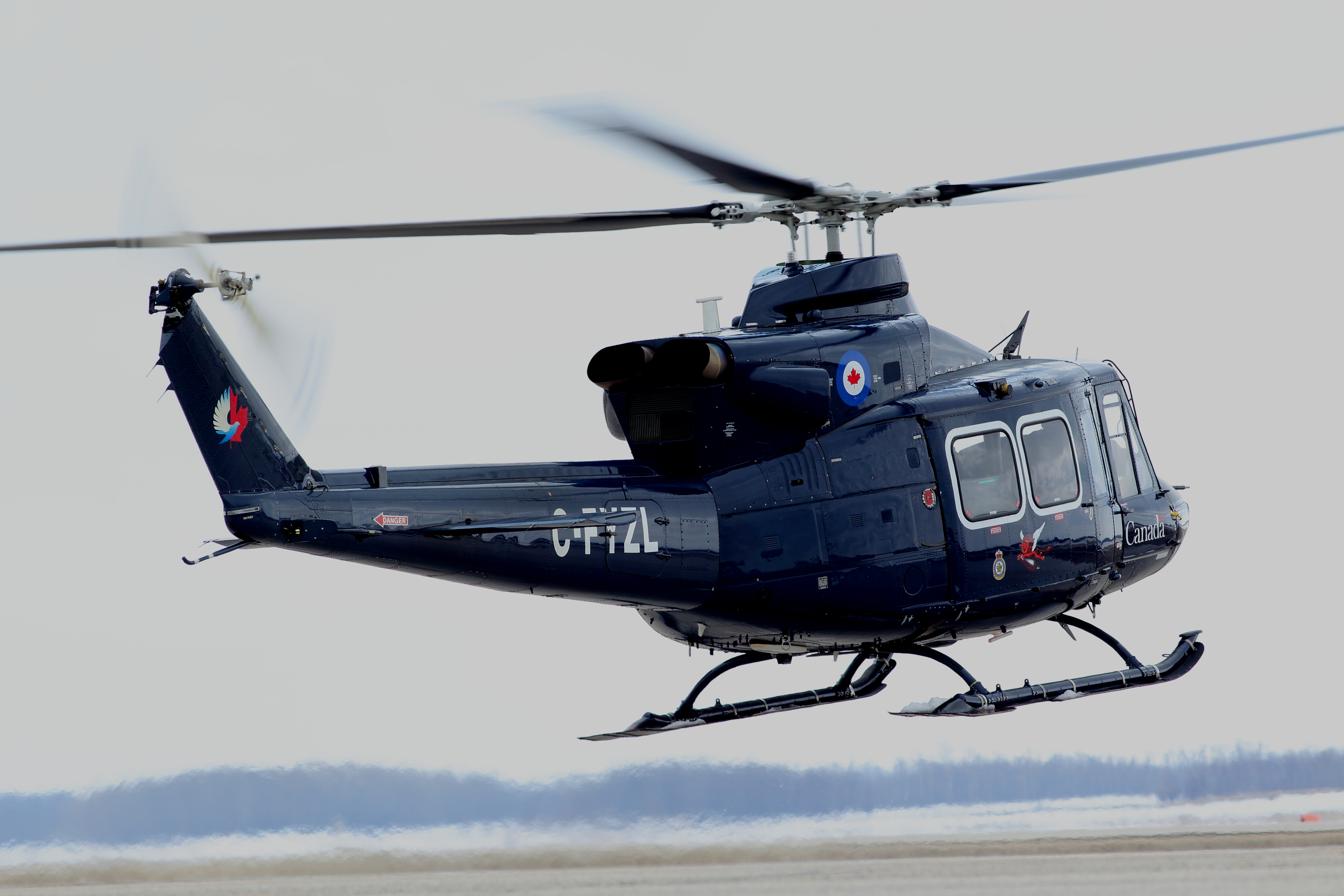
B412CF CFTS

The contractor provides the aircraft, facilities, accommodations and courseware. The RCAF provides the instructor pilots for training students on the B412CF Outlaw and Bell B206B-3 Jet Ranger.

Lead-in Navigator Training

The contractor provides the aircraft (Grob G120A), facilities, accommodations, flight instructors and courseware used to initiate air navigators in their flying training.

== Aircraft ==
The following 42 aircraft are owned and maintained by KF Defence Programs as of 16 December 2016:

quantity	type
13	Grob G120A
7	Beechcraft King Air C90B (upgraded from C90A)
13	Bell B206B-3 Jet Ranger
9	B412CF Outlaw
