= Cargojet =

Cargo airline of Canada

| IATA | ICAO | Call sign |
|---|---|---|
| W8 | CJT | CARGOJET |
- Founded: August 2001; 25 years ago (as Canada 3000 Cargo)
- Commenced operations: February 21, 2002; 24 years ago (as Cargojet)
- AOC #: Canada: 11674; United States: W29F899F
- Hubs: Hamilton (ON)
- Secondary hubs: Calgary; Montréal–Mirabel; Vancouver; Winnipeg
- Fleet size: 41
- Destinations: 16
- Parent company: Cargojet Inc.
- Traded as: TSX: CJT
- Headquarters: 2281 North Sheridan Way, Mississauga, Ontario, Canada
- Key people: Ajay K. Virmani (President & CEO); Paul Godfrey (Chairman of the Board)
- Employees: 1,650
- Website: www.cargojet.com

Cargojet Inc. (TSX: CJT) is a scheduled cargo airline based in Mississauga, Ontario, Canada. It operates cargo services in Canada and internationally, as well as full aircraft charters. Its main base is John C. Munro Hamilton International Airport. Cargojet is a public company with over 1,650 employees.

== History ==
In August 2001, Dr. Ajay Virmani formed Canada 3000 Cargo Inc., a joint venture with Canada 3000 Airlines. In 2002, Dr. Virmani acquired 100% of Canada 3000 Cargo Inc. and rebranded the company as Cargojet Canada Ltd. In July 2002, it acquired Winnport Logistics. In 2005, Cargojet became a public company. In May 2019, Cargojet announced a partnership with Canadian rapper Drake, naming him an ambassador of the brand.

== Destinations ==
Cargojet operates a domestic scheduled cargo service to 15 Canadian destinations. Cargojet also operates an international scheduled cargo network which includes routes to several countries and territories, including Bermuda, Cuba, Germany, Japan, Mexico, the United Kingdom, and the United States.

=== Interline agreements ===
In December 2025 the interline agreement with Uzbekistan-based My Freighter Airlines was signed in order to strengthen Central Asia–North America connectivity and to link Canada with Tashkent via Europe.

== Fleet ==
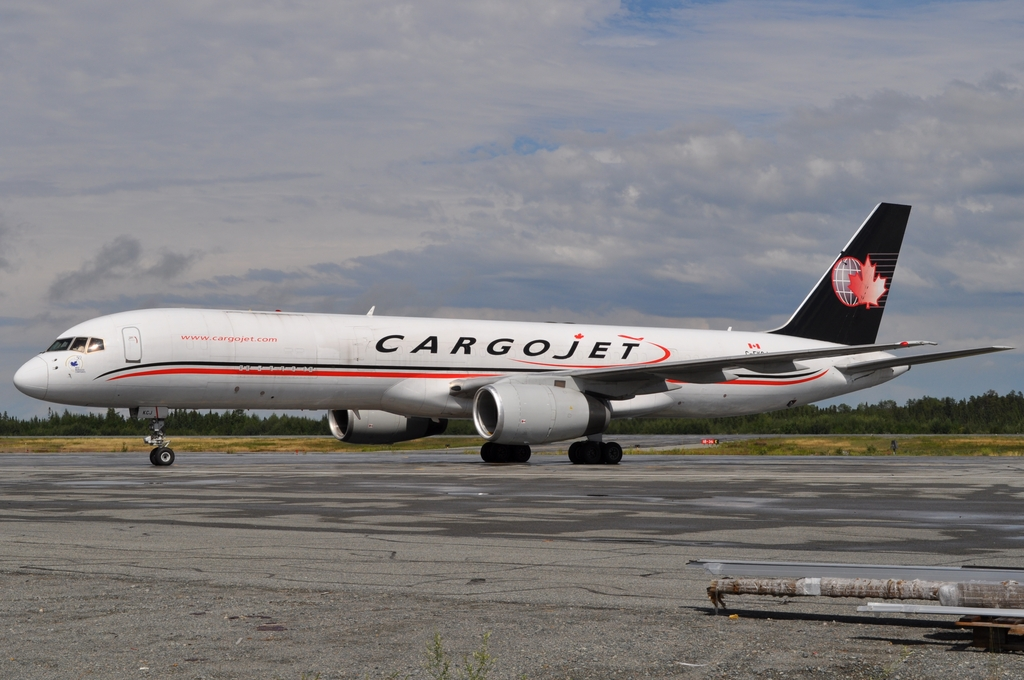
A Cargojet 757-200 at Val-d'Or Airport

On January 12, 2021, Cargojet announced its intent to add additional Boeing 767F as well as Boeing 777F aircraft to its fleet. On January 15, 2024, Cargojet subsequently announced it would no longer take delivery of its 4 B777s on order, due to softening cargo demand.

As of June 2025, Cargojet has the following aircraft registered with Transport Canada:

| Aircraft | In service | Orders | Notes |
|---|---|---|---|
| Boeing 757-200PCF | 18 | — | Payload 80,000 lb (36,000 kg) |
| Boeing 767-200ER/BDSF | 4 | — | Payload 100,000 lb (45,000 kg) |
| Boeing 767-300ER/BDSF | 23 | — | Payload 127,000 lb (58,000 kg) |
| Total | 45 | — | |

== Accidents ==
- On November 19, 2024, a Boeing 767-300F, operating for Amazon Air, overran the north runway at Vancouver International Airport and slid into the grass while landing around 1:45 am. There were no injuries, but the aircraft damage was substantial.
