= John C. Munro Hamilton International Airport =

Airport in Hamilton, Ontario, Canada

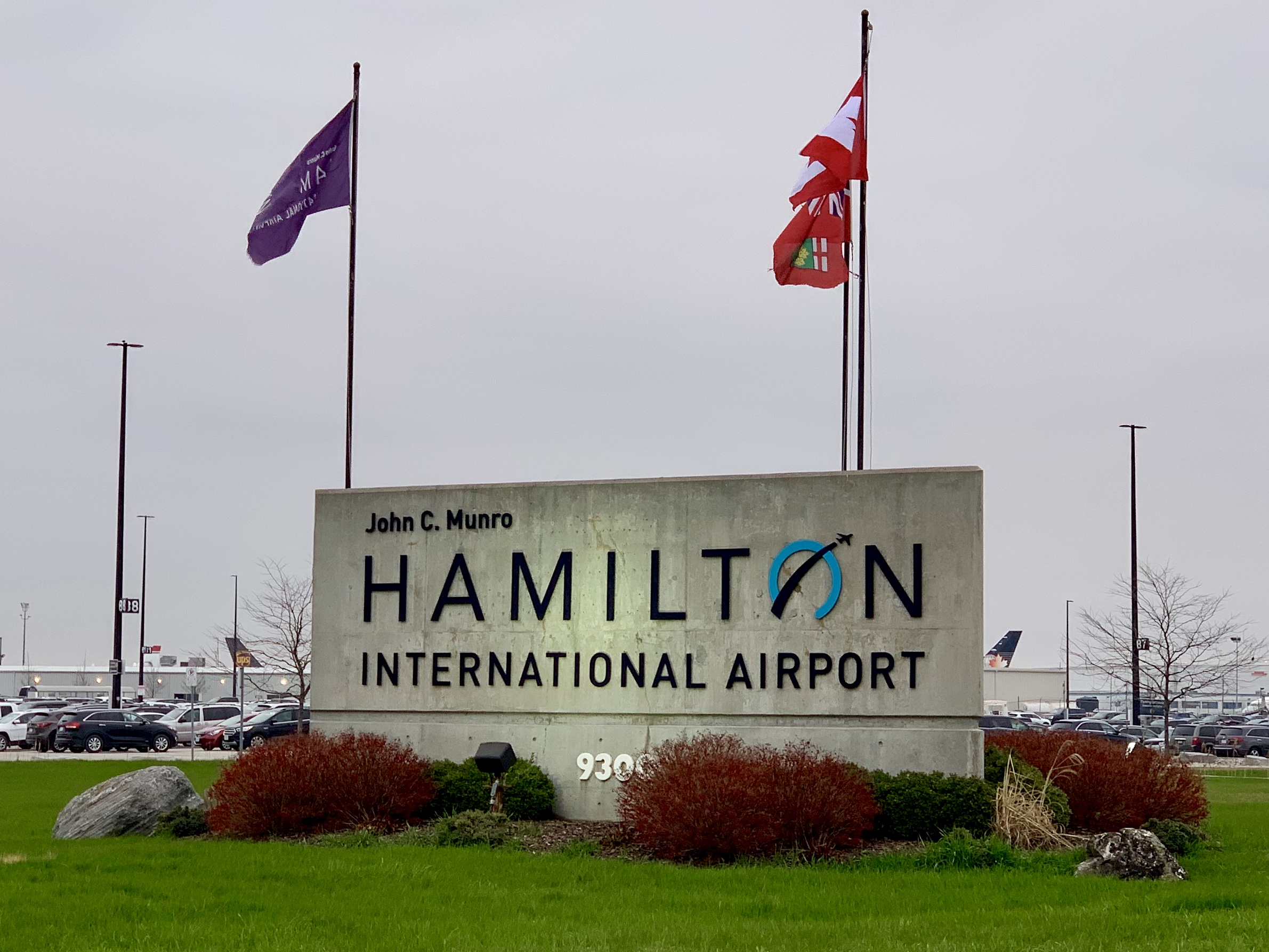
- IATA: YHM; ICAO: CYHM; WMO: 71263

Summary
- Airport type: Public
- Owner: City of Hamilton
- Operator: Airport Operations Controller / TradePort International Corporation
- Serves: Hamilton
- Location: Mount Hope, Ontario, Canada
- Opened: 1940; 86 years ago
- Hub for: Cargojet; UPS Airlines
- Time zone: EST (UTC−05:00)
  - Summer (DST): EDT (UTC−04:00)
- Elevation AMSL: 780 ft (240 m)
- Coordinates: 43°10′25″N 079°56′06″W
- Public transit access: HSR 20
- Website: www.flyhamilton.ca

Map
- Location in Ontario CYHM (Canada)

Runways
| Direction | Length | | Surface |
| Direction | ft | m | Surface |
|---|---|---|---|
| 06/24 | 6,010 | 1,832 | Asphalt |
| 12/30 | 10,006 | 3,050 | Asphalt |

Statistics (2025)
- Number of passengers: 329,595
- Sources: Canada Flight Supplement; Environment Canada; Movements from Statistics Canada; Passengers from Hamilton International Airport

John C. Munro Hamilton International Airport (IATA: YHM, ICAO: CYHM), or simply Hamilton Airport, is an international airport in Hamilton, Ontario, Canada. The airport is part of the neighbourhood of Mount Hope, 11 kilometres (6.8 mi) southwest of downtown Hamilton and 64 km (40 mi) southwest of Toronto. The airport serves the city of Hamilton and adjacent areas of Southern Ontario, including the Greater Toronto Area. It is the closest relief airport for Toronto Pearson International Airport capable of handling jet aircraft. (Note: Billy Bishop Toronto City Airport is closer to Pearson Airport, but cannot handle jet aircraft) The airport is named after John Carr Munro, a longtime Member of Parliament for Hamilton East.

The airport opened in 1940 as Mount Hope Airport, which was primarily a Royal Canadian Air Force base, the history of which is reflected at the Canadian Warplane Heritage Museum located next to the airport. The end of World War II saw the closure of the base, and its conversion to civil use attracted regional and international passenger services with connections to major Canadian cities and seasonal destinations in the United States, the Caribbean and Mexico. Regular services to the United States declined as nearby Buffalo Niagara International Airport gained popularity for cross-border travellers in the region, but Hamilton remained an important base for a number of domestic low-cost carriers.

The airport is the third largest cargo airport (after Toronto–Pearson and Vancouver) and the "largest overnight express cargo airport" in Canada. Hamilton includes a 10,006 ft × 197 ft (3,050 m × 60 m) asphalt runway with centreline lighting for low-visibility operations and a smaller 6,010 ft × 150 ft (1,832 m × 46 m) asphalt runway, enough to handle large cargo operations with aircraft such as the Boeing 747 or Antonov An-124.

== History ==
=== Early history ===
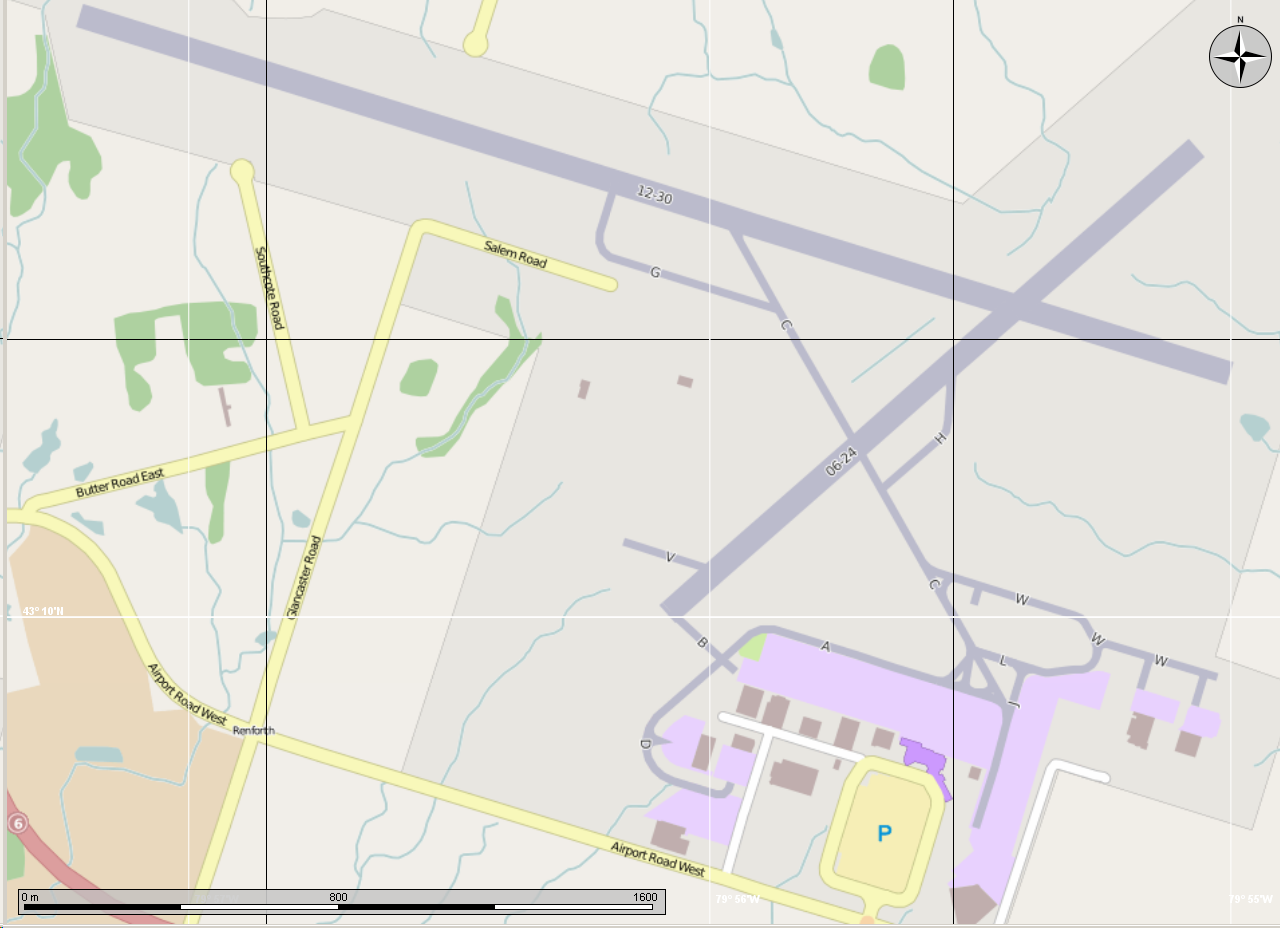
Map of the airport

Hamilton's first airport was the Hamilton Municipal Airport or Civic Airport at Reid Avenue North and Dunsmure Road (site of Roxborough Park) in 1929. It began as the home to the Hamilton Aeroclub. The Royal Canadian Air Force (RCAF) became a major user of the airport in the 1930s, but the airport closed in the 1950s to make way for residential development.

In 1940, Mount Hope Airport was opened and became the site of RCAF Station Hamilton. During World War II, the field hosted two units for the British Commonwealth Air Training Plan: first, No. 10 Elementary Flying Training School (later moved to RCAF Station Pendleton) using the De Havilland Tiger Moth and Fleet Finch, then No. 33 Air Navigation School using the Avro Anson. After the war, the airport gradually shifted towards civil use, until the military ceased using it as a base for Air Reserve operations in 1964.

From 1969 to 1985, Nordair offered jet service from Hamilton to Montreal, Grand Bahama Island and Windsor. City Express flew to Montreal and Ottawa for three months in 1985. Tempus Air offered same route as City Express from 1986 to 1988. USAir began service to Pittsburgh in 1987. By 1988, Pan Am Express flew to New York City and Nationair flew to London, England. Pan Am Express and Nationair stopped their operations at Hamilton in the following year. Canadian Partner began service to Montreal and Ottawa in 1989.

=== 1990s ===
Canadian Partner's service to Montreal and Ottawa ended in 1991. In the same year, Pem-Air and Air Laurentian offered service to Ottawa but both airlines stopped the route in 1993. Northwest Airlink offered flights to Detroit from 1992 to 1993. There was no scheduled passenger service until Greyhound Air flew to Hamilton in 1996 before the company folded in 1997.

In 1996, Hamilton-Wentworth signed a contract with a private company to manage and operate it for 40 years. The consortium consisted of WestPark Developments, Vancouver Airport Authority and TradePort International Corporation Ltd., a subsidiary of Vantage Airport Group, which manages 10 airports.

=== 2000-2010 ===
In 2000, WestJet expanded to Canada's eastern region, choosing Hamilton as the airline's eastern region hub, and flying to destinations from Newfoundland and Labrador to British Columbia. Continental Airlines also offered service to Cleveland in 2000 but stopped in the same year. In April 2004, seeking to compete with Air Canada for business travellers, WestJet moved its eastern hub from Hamilton to Toronto-Pearson. While Hamilton retained flights to many destinations, services to Montreal and Ottawa were ended. In the wake of the WestJet pullout, CanJet began service to Hamilton in 2003. Then in the spring of 2005, two weeks after Air Canada Jazz announced it would enter the local market with service from Hamilton to Montreal and Ottawa, CanJet announced a complete withdrawal from Hamilton. Citing high fuel prices, Air Canada Jazz withdrew its services from Hamilton airport to Montreal and Ottawa by 2008. From 2007 to 2009, Flyglobespan offered seasonal service to the United Kingdom, including Liverpool, Manchester and Doncaster. In 2010, WestJet cut two-thirds of its flights out of Hamilton. The only remaining service by WestJet was one daily service to Calgary. In 2015, Air Canada Rouge planned to begin daily service to Calgary by June 2015 but the launch was delayed and ultimately cancelled.

In 2007, YVR Airport Services (now Vantage Airport Group), which runs the Vancouver International Airport, took over 100 per cent ownership of TradePort International in a CA$13 million deal. In late 2007, Trade Port Co. and Citi Corp. bought land from the city of Hamilton to expand runway 06/24 to 9,000 ft (2,743 m). This was expected to happen sometime between 2015 and 2019.

=== 2010-present ===
Hamilton saw growth as Air Canada resumed daily flights to Montreal in 2016 via Air Canada Express and WestJet adding service to Edmonton, Halifax and Winnipeg.

In 2017, Hamilton experienced an 80 per cent increase in passengers, to 600,000, which was still well below its capacity of three million per year. In 2018, ultra-low-cost carriers including Swoop, Flair Airlines, Canada Jetlines chose Hamilton as a hub for service to the Greater Toronto region. Flair Airlines later shifted operations to Toronto-Pearson in mid-2018 and Air Canada Express again ended its service to Montreal in early-2019. From March to September 2019, Norwegian Air Shuttle operated flights to Dublin, bringing transatlantic service to Hamilton for the first time in over a decade, but ceased operations citing Boeing 737 MAX groundings.

During the COVID-19 pandemic in Ontario, Hamilton airport saw 60% reduction in passenger services over the year 2020 while peak levels of cargo operations were maintained. The airport was a key entry point for imported medical supplies into the country, including Canada's first shipment of the Pfizer–BioNTech vaccine which landed on December 14, 2020 from Cologne, Germany by UPS Airlines.

In January 2023, Icelandic airline Play announced plans to bring flights between Hamilton and Reykjavík in June 2023, re-introducing service to Europe. However, the airline ended this route on April 23, 2025.

In June 2025, Porter Airlines began scheduled service from Munro to four destinations: Calgary, Edmonton, Halifax and Vancouver.

== Secondary airport for Toronto ==
Since the 1970s, the Greater Toronto Airports Authority (GTAA) and the Government of Canada planned a second international airport for Toronto in Pickering, Ontario, to act as an official relief airport for Toronto-Pearson. Supporters of the plan argued that Hamilton is too far from Toronto to be a reliever, while the opposers pointed out that relief airports for Logan International Airport in Boston (Rhode Island T. F. Green International Airport and Manchester–Boston Regional Airport), for example, are farther from downtown Boston than Hamilton Airport is from downtown Toronto. In October 2017, the Pickering City Council supported the development of an airport in Pickering during its joint-bid with the rest of Greater Toronto to host Amazon HQ2. However, a GTAA report in December 2017 suggested that an airport in Pickering was not necessary at the moment and that Pearson can meet demand until 2037. Hamilton charges 30 to 50 per cent lower fees to airlines than Pearson and its compact size makes travel quicker for passengers and allows aircraft to spend less time on the ground.

== Airlines and destinations ==
=== Passenger ===
| Airlines | Destinations |
|---|---|
| Porter Airlines | Calgary, Edmonton, Halifax, Montréal–MET, Ottawa, St. John's (NL), Vancouver, Winnipeg; Seasonal: Cancún, Charlottetown (begins June 19, 2027), Fort Lauderdale, Moncton (begins May 21, 2027), Montego Bay (begins December 20, 2026), Orlando, Puerto Vallarta, Tampa (begins December 18, 2026) |
| WestJet | Calgary; Seasonal: Cancún, Punta Cana |

== Ground transportation ==
The airport is accessible by road via Highway 6, which connects to Highway 403.

The Hamilton Street Railway (HSR) operates bus route 20 A-Line Express, a limited-stop service, from the airport to Hamilton GO Centre and West Harbour GO Station.

Megabus began daily express service between the airport and Toronto in 2019, as of 2024 serving one trip a day from the Union Station Bus Terminal. King Shuttle provides pre-booked service from the airport to Toronto Pearson International Airport, Toronto Union Station, other destinations in Greater Toronto Area, and Niagara Falls.

=== Airline coaches ===
| Operator | Destinations |
|---|---|
| Air Canada (operated by Landline) | Toronto–Pearson |

Air Canada operates "land-air" motorcoach connection services between Hamilton International Airport and Toronto Pearson International Airport, as they are deemed too close geographically for regularly scheduled flights to be operated economically. The service provides ticketed Air Canada and Star Alliance passengers with multiple daily non-stop ground connections between Hamilton Airport and Terminal 1 at Toronto Pearson.

== Statistics ==
=== Passenger ===
Annual passenger traffic
| Year | Passengers | % change |
|---|---|---|
| 2010 | 387,831 | Steady |
| 2011 | 332,659 | ▼14.2% |
| 2012 | 351,491 | ▲5.6% |
| 2013 | 341,740 | ▼2.8% |
| 2014 | 332,378 | ▼2.7% |
| 2015 | 312,839 | ▼5.9% |
| 2016 | 333,368 | ▲6.7% |
| 2017 | 599,146 | ▲80% |
| 2018 | 725,630 | ▲21% |
| 2019 | 955,373 | ▲32% |
| 2020 | 329,193 | ▼66% |
| 2021 | 250,019 | ▼24% |
| 2022 | 645,789 | ▲158% |
| 2023 | 820,011 | ▲27% |
| 2024 | 324,336 | ▼60% |
| 2025 | 329,595 | ▲1.6% |

Hamilton has experienced significant volatility in its passenger traffic numbers. The airport met its peak at 1,041,204 passengers in 2003, when it was a hub for WestJet for a year before moving operations to Toronto-Pearson. Between 2016 and 2019, passenger numbers again increased close to a million passengers as more low-cost carriers began service at the airport. Passenger numbers sharply declined in 2020 after the onset of the COVID-19 pandemic.

=== Cargo ===
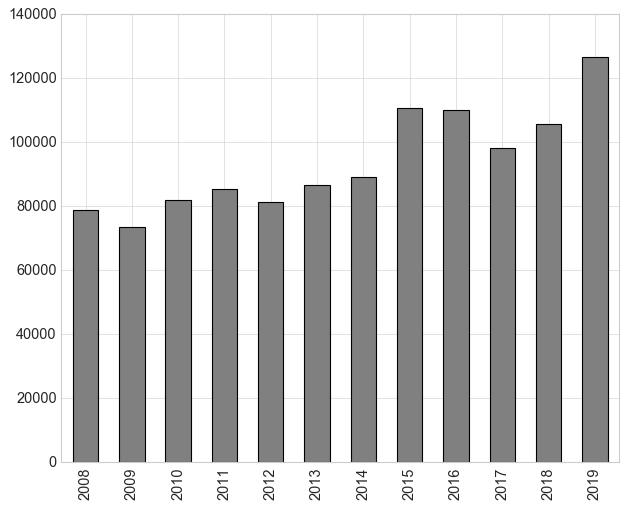
Annual cargo tonnage in metric tonnes.

With about 25% of the annual cargo tonnage of Canada's busiest cargo airport Toronto-Pearson, Hamilton is a major Canadian cargo airport. It has consistently ranked as the third or fourth busiest cargo airport in Canada over the last decade behind only Toronto-Pearson, Vancouver and, since 2017, Montréal–Trudeau. With around 70% of Hamilton's cargo tonnage being domestic cargo it has consistently ranked as the third busiest domestic cargo airport in Canada behind Vancouver and Toronto. Amazon, DHL, Purolator, and UPS operate major shipping centres within or next to the airport.

== Aviation institutions ==
The aviation programs of Mohawk College have shared facilities at the airport with KF Aerospace. In 2021, they opened up the Mohawk College Centre for Aviation Technology which includes over 75,000 square feet of learning spaces and a capacity of over 300 students.

== See also ==
- List of airports in the Greater Toronto Area
