= Northern Air Charter =

Airline in Alberta, Canada

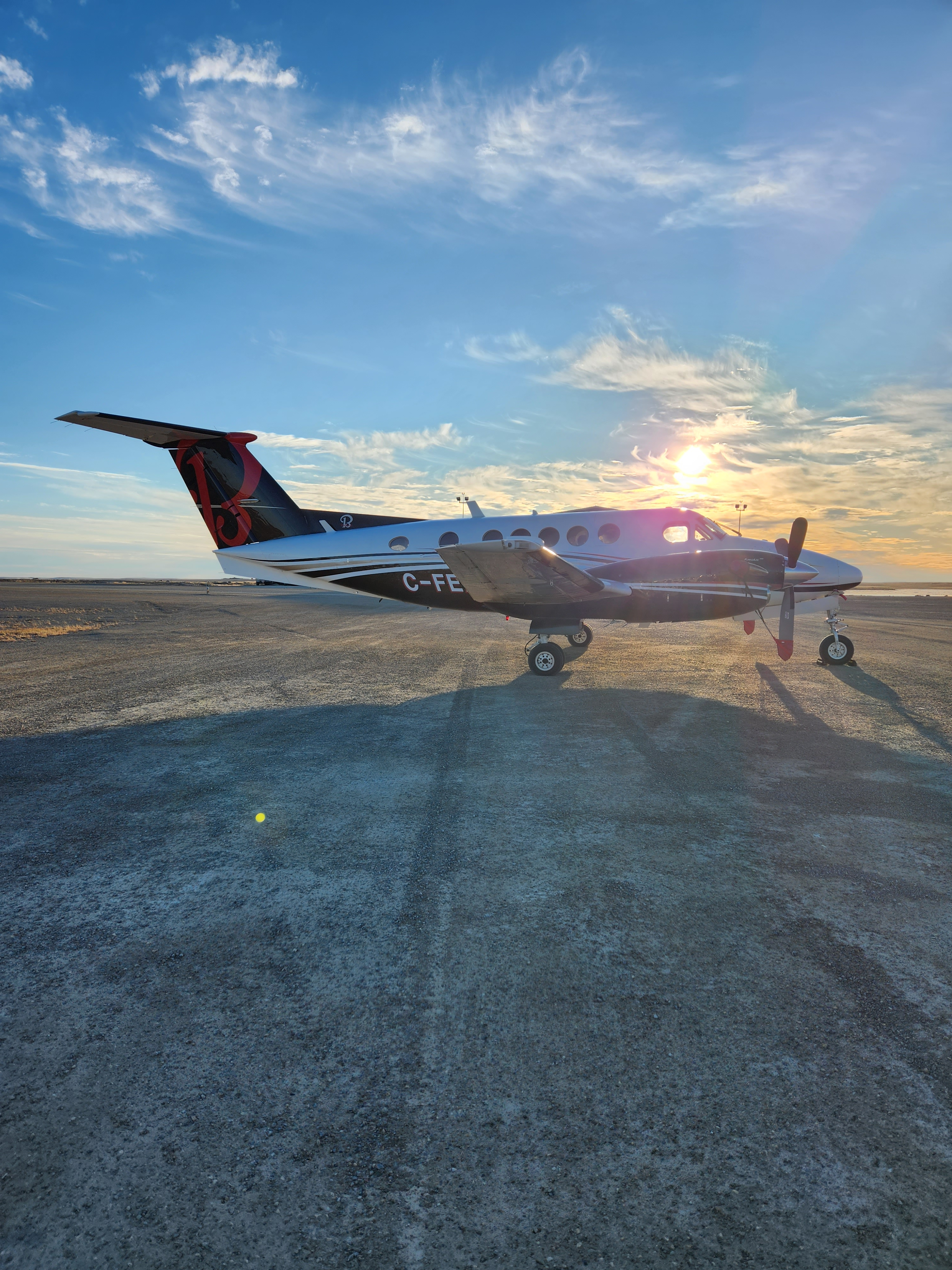
- Northern Air Charter BE20 Beechcraft Super King Air
IATA	ICAO	Call sign
—	NLI	NORTHLINK
- Founded: 1984
- AOC #: Canada: 3787; United States: WHPF042F
- Hubs: Peace River Airport
- Fleet size: 5
- Headquarters: Peace River, Alberta
- Website: https://www.naco.flynorthernair.com/

Northern Air Charter is a small airline based in Peace River, Alberta, Canada. Prior to the COVID-19 pandemic it provided scheduled services throughout northern Ontario Alberta to Edmonton International Airport and Calgary International Airport. In 2019 Northern Air lost the Alberta medevac contract to Canwest Air. The airline provides charter services throughout North America.

== Fleet ==
=== Current ===
As of 26 February 2023, Northern Air Charter has the following aircraft registered with Transport Canada.

Northern Air Charter fleet
Aircraft	Variants	Number	Passengers	Notes
Beechcraft King Air	Model 90	1	5	
Beechcraft Super King Air	Model 200	2	7/9	Can be used as air ambulance and cargo
Ayres Thrush	S-2R-T	1	—	Agricultural aircraft not listed at Northern Air
Total	7			

=== Historical ===
Aircraft previously operated by Northern Air Charter not included above:

- Beechcraft Queen Air (Model 65)
- Beechcraft King Air (Model 100)
- Beechcraft 1900
- Britten-Norman BN-2 Islander
- Cessna 150
- Cessna 172
- Cessna 185 Skywagon
- Cessna 208
- Cessna 210 Centurion
- de Havilland Canada DHC-6 Twin Otter
- Piper PA-23
- Piper PA-28 Cherokee
- Piper PA-31 Navajo
