= Structure of the Royal Canadian Air Force =

The Royal Canadian Air Force structure is organized into Wings, Squadrons, and Divisions, each responsible for different operational, training, or support functions. It is commanded by the Commander of the Royal Canadian Air Force, who reports to the Chief of the Defence Staff. Major divisions include 1 Canadian Air Division (operations), 2 Canadian Air Division (training), and 3 Canadian Space Division (space operations).

== Royal Canadian Air Force Headquarters ==
- Commander of the Royal Canadian Air Force
  - The Commander of the RCAF is also Chief of Air Force Staff. As the senior Air Force officer in the Canadian Armed Forces (CAF), they act as an advisor to the Chief of the Defence Staff on matters regarding air and space military capabilities to meet Canada’s defence objectives.
  - As of December 2025: Lieutenant-General Jamie Speiser-Blanchet
- Royal Canadian Air Force Command Chief Warrant Officer
  - The RCAF Command Chief Warrant Officer is the senior enlisted member of the Air Force. They act as an advisor to the Commander of the RCAF on matters affecting all ranks in matters related to dress, discipline, morale and welfare, and quality of life.
  - As of December 2025: Chief Warrant Officer Renee J. Hansen

== 1 Canadian Air Division ==
The operational headquarters of the Royal Canadian Air Force (RCAF) resides in Winnipeg, Manitoba, home of 1 Canadian Air Division, the Canadian NORAD Region, Joint Force Air Component (JFAC) and Search and Rescue Region Trenton. This headquarters is the source of air power provided by the RCAF to Commander Canadian Joint Operations Command for domestic and overseas missions, Commander Canadian Special Operations Forces Command, Commander of NORAD through CANR, and commanders of the Search and Rescue Regions across Canada.

- 1 Wing Kingston
  - 400 Tactical Helicopter Squadron, CH-146 Griffon (CFB Borden)
  - 403 Helicopter Operational Training Squadron, CH-146 Griffon (5 CDSB Gagetown)
  - 408 Tactical Helicopter Squadron, CH-146 Griffon (3 CDSB Edmonton)
  - 430 Tactical Helicopter Squadron, CH-146 Griffon (2 CDSB Valcartier)
  - 438 Tactical Helicopter Squadron, CH-146 Griffon (Saint-Hubert, Quebec)
  - 450 Tactical Helicopter Squadron, CH-47F Chinook (4 CDSB Petawawa)
- 2 Wing Bagotville
  - 2 Mission Support Squadron
  - 2 Air Expeditionary Training Squadron
  - 2 Operational Support Squadron
  - 4 Construction Engineering Squadron (CFB Cold Lake)
  - 8 Air Communications and Control Squadron (CFB Trenton)
  - 2 Air Support Operations Squadron
  - 14 Construction Engineering Squadron (Bridgewater, Nova Scotia)
- 3 Wing Bagotville
  - 425 Tactical Fighter Squadron, CF-188 Hornet
  - 433 Tactical Fighter Squadron, CF-188 Hornet
  - 439 Combat Support Squadron, CH-146 Griffon
  - 12 Radar Squadron
  - 3 Air Maintenance Squadron
  - 3 Wing Air Reserve Flight
  - Forward Operating Location Iqaluit
- 4 Wing Cold Lake
  - 401 Tactical Fighter Squadron, CF-188 Hornet
  - 409 Tactical Fighter Squadron, CF-188 Hornet
  - 417 Combat Support Squadron, Bell CH-146 Griffon
  - 410 Tactical Fighter Operational Training Squadron, CF-188 Hornet
  - 419 Tactical Fighter Training Squadron, CT-155 Hawk
  - 42 Radar Squadron
  - 10 Field Technical Training Squadron
  - 1 Air Maintenance Squadron
  - 4 Wing Air Reserve Flight
  - Forward Operating Location Inuvik
  - Forward Operating Location Yellowknife
- 5 Wing Goose Bay
  - 444 Combat Support Squadron, CH-146 Griffon
  - 5 Wing Air Reserve Flight
  - Forward Operating Location Goose Bay
- 8 Wing Trenton
  - Canadian Forces Station Alert (Nunavut)
  - 426 Transport Training Squadron, CC-130H Hercules, CC-130J Hercules, CC-150 Polaris
  - 424 Transport and Rescue Squadron, Bell CH-146 Griffon, CC-130H Hercules
  - 429 Transport Squadron, CC-177 Globemaster III
  - 436 Transport Squadron, CC-130J Hercules
  - 437 Transport Squadron, CC-150 Polaris
  - 412 Transport Squadron, CC-144 Challenger (Ottawa International Airport)
  - 440 Transport Squadron, CC-138 Twin Otter (Yellowknife Airport)
  - 8 Air Maintenance Squadron
  - 8 Wing Air Reserve Flight
- 9 Wing Gander
  - 103 Search and Rescue Squadron, CH-149 Cormorant
  - 9 Wing Air Reserve Flight
    - Air Reserve Flight Detachment Torbay (St. John's International Airport)
- 12 Wing Shearwater
  - 406 Maritime Operational Training Squadron, CH-148 Cyclone
  - 423 Maritime Helicopter Squadron, CH-148 Cyclone
  - 443 Maritime Helicopter Squadron, CH-148 Cyclone (Arundel Castle)
  - 12 Air Maintenance Squadron
  - 12 Wing Air Reserve Flight
- 14 Wing Greenwood
  - 404 Long Range Patrol and Training Squadron, CP-140 Aurora
  - 415 Long Range Patrol Force Development Squadron, CP-140 Aurora
  - 405 Long Range Patrol Squadron, CP-140 Aurora
  - 413 Transport and Rescue Squadron, CC-130 Hercules, CH-149 Cormorant
  - 14 Air Maintenance Squadron
  - 14 Air Reserve Flight
  - 91 Construction Engineering Flight (CFB Gander)
  - 143 Construction Engineering Flight (Lunenburg, Nova Scotia)
  - 144 Construction Engineering Flight (Pictou, Nova Scotia)
- 19 Wing Comox
  - Canadian Forces School of Search and Rescue
  - 418 Search and Rescue Operational Training Squadron, CC-295 Kingfisher
  - 435 Transport and Rescue Squadron, C-130 Hercules (CFB Winnipeg)
  - 442 Transport and Rescue Squadron, CH-149 Cormorant
  - 407 Long Range Patrol Squadron, CP-140 Aurora
  - 19 Air Maintenance Squadron
  - 19 Wing Air Reserve Flight
  - 192 Construction Engineering Flight (Abbotsford, British Columbia)
- 22 Wing North Bay
  - 21 Aerospace Control and Warning Squadron
  - 51 Aerospace Control and Warning Operational Training Squadron
  - Detachment 2, First Air Force (United States Air Force)
  - 22 Wing Air Reserve Flight
- Combined Aerospace Operations Centre

== 2 Canadian Air Division ==
2 Canadian Air Division (2 CAD) is a key formation of the Royal Canadian Air Force that is responsible for overseeing all individual training and education within the Air Force. Headquartered in 17 Winnipeg, 2 CAD ensures that RCAF personnel, whether pilots, aircrew, technicians, or support staff receive the necessary training to meet operational and professional requirements.

- 15 Wing Moose Jaw
  - 2 Canadian Forces Flying Training School, CT-155 Hawk, CT-156 Harvard II
  - 3 Canadian Forces Flying Training School, CT-145 / C-90B King Air, CH-139 Jet Ranger, Bell 412 CF, Grob-G120A (Portage la Prairie, Manitoba)
  - 15 Air Traffic Control Squadron
  - 431 Air Demonstration Squadron (CF Snowbirds), CT-114 Tutor (Spring training at CFB Comox)
- 16 Wing Borden
  - Royal Canadian Air Force Academy
  - Canadian Forces School of Aerospace Technology and Engineering
  - Canadian Forces School of Aerospace Control Operations (NAVCAN Training School in Cornwall, Ontario)
  - 16 Wing Air Reserve Flight
- 17 Wing Winnipeg
  - 402 Squadron, CT-142 Dash-8
  - Royal Canadian Air Force Band
  - Royal Canadian Air Force W/C William G. Barker, VC Aerospace College
  - Canadian Forces School of Survival and Aeromedical Training

== 3 Canadian Space Division ==
3 Canadian Space Division (3 CSD) is responsible for delivering space power effects in support of Canadian Armed Forces operations.

- 7 Wing (Space) (Ottawa, Ontario)
  - 7 Space Operations Squadron
  - 7 Operations Support Squadron

== Royal Canadian Air Force Aerospace Warfare Centre ==
The Royal Canadian Air Force Aerospace Warfare Centre (RCAF AWC) is the centre of excellence for leading modern advances to techniques, technology, innovation and concepts for the Royal Canadian Air Force (RCAF), while also acting as its steward for history and heritage.

- Royal Canadian Air Force Aerospace Warfare Centre (CFB Trenton)
  - 414 Electronic Warfare Support Squadron (Ottawa, CFB Halifax, CFB Esquimalt)
  - 434 Operational Test and Evaluation Squadron
    - Maritime Helicopter Test and Evaluation Flight (MHTEF), CH-148 Cyclone (Shearwater Heliport/CFB Halifax)
    - Long Range Patrol Operational Test and Evaluation Flight (LRPTEF), CP-140 Aurora (CFB Greenwood)
    - Land Aviation Test and Evaluation Flight (LATEF), CH-47 Chinook, CH-146 Griffon (Saint-Hubert, Quebec)
    - Fighter Operational Test and Evaluation Flight (FOTEF), CF-188 Hornet (CFB Cold Lake)
    - Search and Rescue Test and Evaluation Flight (SARTEF), CH-149 Cormorant, CC-130 Hercules, CH-146 Griffon (CFB Comox)
    - Special Operations Aviation Test and Evaluation Flight (SOATEF)
    - Aerospace Test and Evaluation Flight (AEROTEF)
    - Transport Operational Test and Evaluation Flight (TOTEF)
  - Air and Space Power Development Centre
  - Air and Space Integration Programme
