= 1990 in Canada =

- Decades: 1970s; 1980s; 1990s; 2000s; 2010s
- See also: History of Canada; Timeline of Canadian history; List of years in Canada

The following events occurred in Canada in the year 1990.

== Incumbents ==
and (senate 130)

=== Crown ===
- Monarch – Elizabeth II

=== Federal government ===
- Governor General – Jeanne Sauvé (until January 29) then Ray Hnatyshyn
- Prime Minister – Brian Mulroney
- Chief Justice – Brian Dickson (Manitoba) (until 30 June) then Antonio Lamer (Quebec)
- Parliament – 34th

=== Provincial governments ===
==== Lieutenant governors ====
- Lieutenant Governor of Alberta – Helen Hunley
- Lieutenant Governor of British Columbia – David Lam
- Lieutenant Governor of Manitoba – George Johnson
- Lieutenant Governor of New Brunswick – Gilbert Finn
- Lieutenant Governor of Newfoundland – James McGrath
- Lieutenant Governor of Nova Scotia – Lloyd Crouse
- Lieutenant Governor of Ontario – Lincoln Alexander
- Lieutenant Governor of Prince Edward Island – Lloyd MacPhail (until August 16) then Marion Reid
- Lieutenant Governor of Quebec – Gilles Lamontagne (until August 9) then Martial Asselin
- Lieutenant Governor of Saskatchewan – Sylvia Fedoruk

==== Premiers ====
- Premier of Alberta – Don Getty
- Premier of British Columbia – Bill Vander Zalm
- Premier of Manitoba – Gary Filmon
- Premier of New Brunswick – Frank McKenna
- Premier of Newfoundland – Clyde Wells
- Premier of Nova Scotia – John Buchanan (until September 12) then Roger Bacon
- Premier of Ontario – David Peterson (until October 1) then Bob Rae
- Premier of Prince Edward Island – Joe Ghiz
- Premier of Quebec – Robert Bourassa
- Premier of Saskatchewan – Grant Devine

=== Territorial governments ===
==== Commissioners ====
- Commissioner of Yukon – John Kenneth McKinnon
- Commissioner of Northwest Territories – Daniel L. Norris

==== Premiers ====
- Premier of the Northwest Territories – Dennis Patterson
- Premier of Yukon – Tony Penikett

== Events ==
=== January to June ===
- January 15 – Massive cuts to Via Rail come into effect leading to the rerouting of The Canadian and many intercity trains.
- January 24 – The Tories introduce legislation that would create the Goods and Services Tax (GST), a national sales tax.
- January 24 – Jean Charest resigns from cabinet after he was found to have spoken with a judge.
- January 29 – Ramon John Hnatyshyn replaces Jeanne Sauvé as governor general.
- January 29 – A controversial resolution is passed by the city council of Sault Ste. Marie, Ontario, declaring the city "English-only".
- February: The federal government announces that it will privatize Petro-Canada; the legislation to do so is introduced in October..
- February 12 – A massive tire fire begins near Hagersville, Ontario. It takes 17 days to put out.
- February 12 – 1990 Chambly by-election.
- March 9 – Newfoundland Premier Clyde Wells confirms he will rescind Newfoundland's approval of the Meech Lake Accord.
- March 15 – The federal government decides that Sikhs may wear turbans while serving as Royal Canadian Mounted Police (RCMP) officers following the Baltej Singh Dhillon case.
- March 22 – Canadian arms designer Gerald Bull is assassinated in Brussels.
- April 1 – The World Wrestling Federation holds WrestleMania VI from SkyDome in Toronto, Ontario, drawing a crowd of 67,678.
- May 12 – The Bloc Québécois Party is formed as several MPs led by Lucien Bouchard quit the Tories and Liberals.
- May 24 – The Edmonton Oilers win the 1990 Stanley Cup Final.
- May 29 – Mikhail Gorbachev, President of the Soviet Union, arrives in Ottawa for a 29-hour visit.
- June 6 – Stanley Charles Waters is the first elected senator.
- June 12 – Elijah Harper prevents Manitoba from accepting the Meech Lake Accord.
- June 17–30 – Nelson Mandela tours North America, visiting three Canadian and eight U.S. cities.
- June 23 – Meech Lake Accord officially dead.
- June 23 – Jean Chrétien elected leader of the Liberal Party of Canada at a leadership convention held in Calgary.

=== July to December ===
- July 11 – The Oka crisis begins.
- September 6 – Bob Rae's Ontario New Democratic Party wins a surprise majority in Ontario.
- September 12 – Roger Bacon becomes premier of Nova Scotia, replacing John Buchanan.
- September 26 – Oka crisis ends.
- September 27 – Brian Mulroney temporarily increases the size of the Senate to ensure passage of the GST.
- October 1 – Bob Rae becomes premier of Ontario, replacing David Peterson.
- November 1 – Brian Mulroney launches the Citizen's Forum on Canada's Future to get Canadians' input on constitutional reform.
- December 10 – Jean Chrétien is returned to the House of Commons after winning a by election for the New Brunswick riding of Beauséjour.
- December 13 – The Senate of Canada approves the GST..
- December 17 – The GST becomes law.

== Arts and literature ==
- March 6 – The National Gallery of Canada acquires Barnett Newman's Voice of Fire for $1.8 million, causing a storm of controversy.

=== New works ===
- Swann by Carol Shields published
- The Evening News by Arthur Hailey
- A Tenured Professor by John Kenneth Galbraith
- TekWar by William Shatner
- Magic Casement by Dave Duncan
- Golden Fleece by Robert J. Sawyer
- Medicine River by Thomas King
- The Magic Machine: A Handbook of Computer Sorcery by Alexander Dewdney
- Whylah Falls by George Elliott Clarke
- The Wild Blue Yonder by Audrey Thomas
- L'Oursiade by Antonine Maillet

=== Awards ===
- See 1990 Governor General's Awards for a complete list of winners and finalists for those awards.
- Books in Canada First Novel Award: Sandra Birdsell, The Missing Child
- Geoffrey Bilson Award: Kit Pearson, The Sky Is Falling
- Gerald Lampert Award: Steven Heighton, Stalin's Carnival
- Marian Engel Award: Carol Shields
- Pat Lowther Award: Patricia Young, The Mad and Beautiful Mothers
- Stephen Leacock Award: W.O. Mitchell, According to Jake and the Kid
- Trillium Book Award: Alice Munro, Friend of My Youth
- Vicky Metcalf Award: Bernice Thurman Hunter

=== Music ===
- RPM number-one hits of 1990
- RPM number-one albums of 1990

== Sport ==
- May 13 – The Oshawa Generals win their fourth (and first since 1944) Memorial Cup by defeating the Kitchener Rangers 4 to 3 . The final game was played at Copps Coliseum in Hamilton, Ontario
- May 24 – The Edmonton Oilers win their fifth (and most recent) Stanley Cup by defeating the Boston Bruins 4 games to 1. Brandon, Manitoba's Bill Ranford is awarded the Conn Smythe Trophy
- November 24 – The Saskatchewan Huskies win their first Vanier Cup by defeating the Saint Mary's Huskies 24 to 21 in the 26th Vanier Cup played at Skydome in Toronto
- November 25 – The Winnipeg Blue Bombers win their tenth Grey Cup by defeating the Edmonton Eskimos 50 to 11 in the 78th Grey Cup at BC Place Stadium in Vancouver. Scarborough, Toronto's Warren Hudson is awarded the game's Most Valuable Canadian

Date unknown

- Doug Flutie returns to Canada to play with the BC Lions.

== Births ==
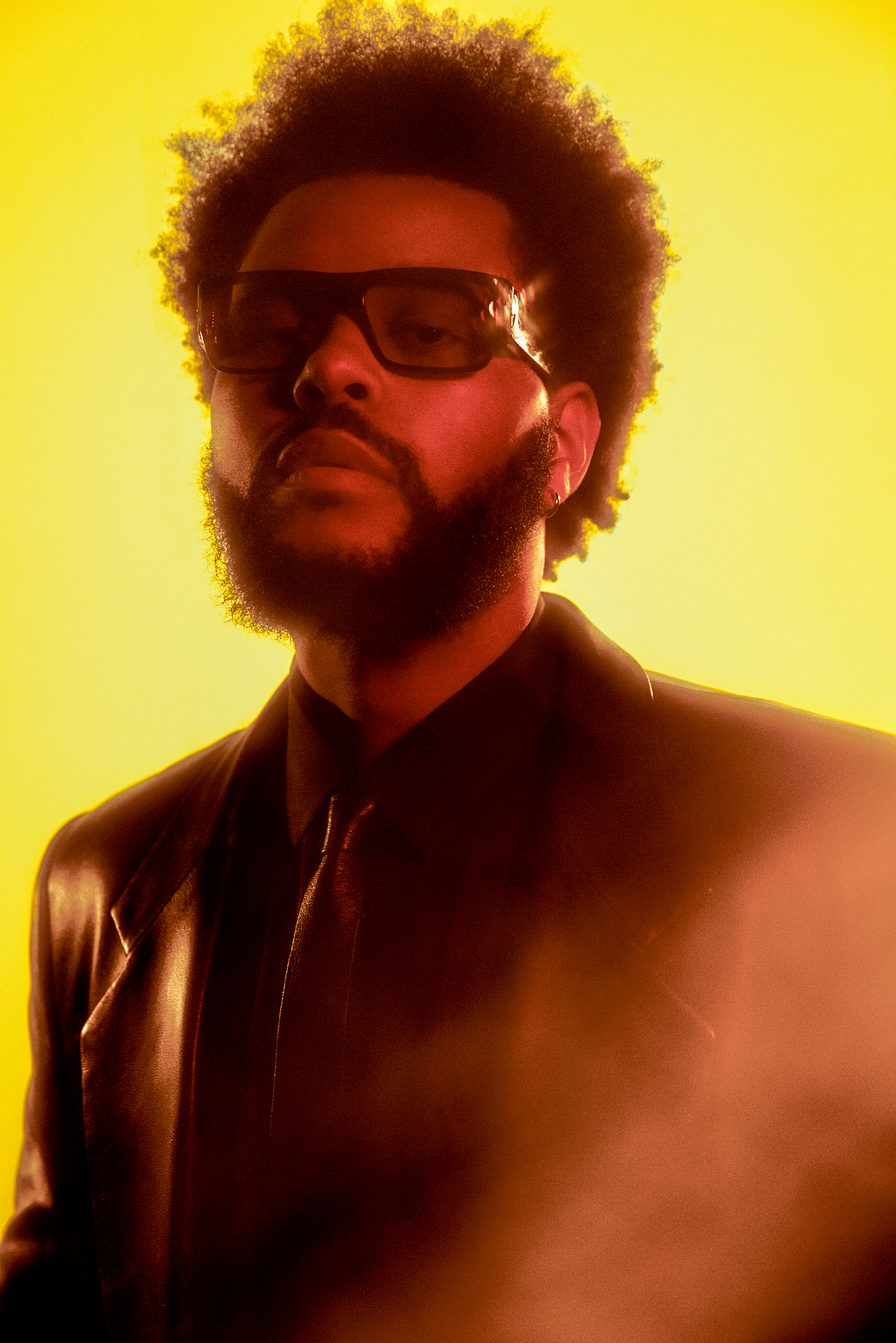
The Weeknd

- January 18
  - Brett Lawrie, baseball player
  - Alex Pietrangelo, ice hockey player
- January 24 – Mitchell Islam, ice dancer
- January 29 – Danielle Parsons, curler
- January 30 – Joe Colborne, ice hockey player
- February 14 – Brett Dier, actor
- February 16 – The Weeknd, singer and songwriter
- February 23
  - Kevin Connauton, ice hockey defenceman
  - Marco Scandella, ice hockey defenceman
- March 2 – Michael Hutchinson, ice hockey player
- April 14 – Adam DiMarco, actor
- April 26 – Riley Voelkel, actress
- May 13 – Jane Creba, murder victim (d. 2005)
- June 3 – Jason Akeson, ice hockey player
- June 4 – Jess Moskaluke, singer
- June 5 – Junior Hoilett, footballer
- June 7 – Michael Stone, ice hockey player
- June 28 – Jasmine Richards, actress and singer
- July 15 – Alexander Calvert, actor
- August 7 – Jake Allen, ice hockey player
- August 15 – Chris Gudzowsky, bobsledder
- September 7 – Megan McNeil, singer (d. 2011)
- September 28 – Kirsten Prout, actress
- October 23 – Dalmar Abuzeid, actor
- November 9 – Chris Di Staulo, filmmaker (d. 2025)
- November 19 – Laura Walker, curler
- December 10 – Reda Agourram, soccer player
- December 11 – Michael Pillarella, actor, writer, film producer and spoken word artist
- December 27 – Milos Raonic, tennis player
- December 31 – Patrick Chan, figure skater

== Deaths ==
=== January to June ===
- January 7 – Bronko Nagurski, American football player (b. 1908)
- March 16 – Dalton McGuinty Sr., politician and father of premier of Ontario Dalton McGuinty and the politician David McGuinty (b. 1926)
- March 22 – Gerald Bull, engineer and artillery designer (b. 1928)
- March 24 – Jim St. James, actor and HIV/AIDS activist
- April 11 – Harold Ballard, owner of the Toronto Maple Leafs (b. 1903)
- May 30 – Cécile Chabot, poet and illustrator (b. 1907)

=== July to September ===
- July 18
  - Johnny Wayne, comedian and comedy writer (b. 1918)
  - Gerry Boulet, Quebec rock singer (Offenbach) (b. 1946)
- August 25 – Morley Callaghan, novelist, short story writer, playwright, and television and radio personality (b. 1903)
- September 6 – Stan Roberts, politician (b. 1927)
- September 11 – Lela Brooks, speed skater and world record holder (b. 1908)

=== October to December ===
- October 22 – Carl Klinck, literary historian and academic (b. 1908)
- October 30 – Craig Russell, female impersonator (b. 1948)
- November 2 – Frederick Thomas Armstrong, politician (b. 1907)
- November 9 – Hugh MacLennan, author and professor of English (b. 1907)
- December 7 – Jean Paul Lemieux, painter (b. 1904)
- December 24 – Tammy Homolka, sister and homicide victim of Karla Homolka (b. 1975)
- December 31 – Robina Higgins, track and field athlete (b. 1915)

== See also ==
- 1990 in Canadian television
- List of Canadian films of 1990
