= CFB North Bay =

Airforce base in Ontario, Canada

CFB North Bay
- North Bay, Ontario, Canada
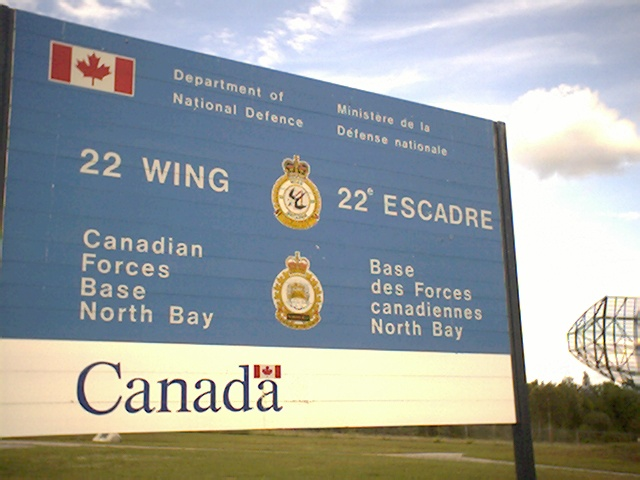
- Entrance sign at main gate of CFB North Bay.

Site information
- Controlled by: Royal Canadian Air Force
- Website: 22 Wing Website

Location
- Location of CFB North Bay
- Location within Ontario
- Coordinates: 46.357846°N 79.416477°W

Site history
- Built: 1951
- Built by: Royal Canadian Air Force

Garrison information
- Current commander: Colonel Joseph Oldford, CD
- Garrison: 22 Wing North Bay: 21 Aerospace Control and Warning Squadron (RCAF); 51 Aerospace Control and Warning Operational Training Squadron (RCAF); Detachment 2, First Air Force (United States Air Force); 22 Wing Air Reserve Flight (RCAF); 22 Wing Band

Canadian Forces Base North Bay, also CFB North Bay, is an air force base located at the City of North Bay, Ontario about 350 km (220 mi) northwest of Ottawa. The base is subordinate to 1 Canadian Air Division, Winnipeg, Manitoba, and is the centre for North American Aerospace Defense Command (NORAD) operations in Canada, under the Canadian NORAD Region Headquarters, also in Winnipeg. It is also home to the First Air Force, Detachment 2 of the United States Air Force. It is located next to and shares infrastructure with North Bay/Jack Garland Airport.

It is an installation built over 60 storeys underground inside a cave and nearly 5 storeys tall.

On 1 April 1993, all air bases in Canada were redesignated as wings; the base was renamed 22 Wing/Canadian Forces Base North Bay. This is abbreviated as 22 Wing/CFB North Bay. Today, although this designation still stands, the base is often referred to simply as "22 Wing", and the Base Commander as the "Wing Commander".

North Bay's air force base is the centre for the air defence of the entire country, and works in concert with the United States via NORAD for the air defence of Canada-U.S. portion of the North American continent. Activities are wide-ranging, from identifying and monitoring all aircraft entering Canada from overseas, to guarding foreign dignitaries travelling in the country's airspace, to assisting aircraft suffering airborne emergencies, to aiding law enforcement versus smugglers, to participating in NORAD's Christmas Eve tracking of Santa Claus for children. From the mid-1970s to the mid-1990s it took in Unidentified Flying Object reports from across the country on behalf of the National Research Council of Canada, relaying the reports to a study at the Herzberg Institute of Astrophysics, British Columbia. In 2000, it resumed UFO reporting, provided to researcher Chris Rutkowski at the University of Manitoba.

In 2010, North Bay's operations centre took the first steps towards transitioning from air to aerospace defence, commencing preparations for Sapphire, Canada's first military satellite. (Note: "Air defence" refers strictly to aviation activities within the atmosphere of the Earth, such as those of helicopters and aircraft. "Aerospace defence" covers these activities as well as those in space, such as monitoring satellites and tracking space junk.) Sapphire functions as a contributing sensor in the United States Space Surveillance Network (SSN), performing surveillance of objects orbiting at 6,000 to 40,000 kilometres altitude, and delivering data on those objects (called Resident Space Objects, or RSOs) to the Space Surveillance Operations Centre (SSOC), in North Bay's operations centre. The SSOC, in turn, coordinates with the Joint Space Operations Center, in Vandenberg, California. On 25 February 2013, Sapphire was launched from a site in India, and underwent technical testing and checks, expected to begin its duties in July 2013. Due to various technical delays, the satellite's FOC (Final Operational Certification) wasn't achieved until 30 January 2014. By end of that year it had delivered 1.2 million observations of space objects.

22 Wing/CFB North Bay has two unique properties among air bases in Canada. It is the only Canadian air base that does not have flying units (since August 1992, when the last flying squadron departed), and the only air base in the country that does not have an airfield (base assets such as control tower, fuel depot and hangars were demolished or sold following the 1992 departure). (Note: Referenced documents cited in this and following sections are from the air base's archives and active files, which have file numbers, publication numbers and registration numbers that may be unfamiliar to those without a military background, although the information's accuracy is assured.)

== Activities at North Bay 1920–1945 ==
=== Pre–Second World War ===
North Bay's first contact with the air force took place on 9 October 1920, when a Government of Canada Felixstowe F.3 flying boat overflew the (then) town during the first crossing of Canada by aircraft. (North Bay was not incorporated as a city until 1925.) The F.3's pilots were Lieutenant-Colonel Robert Leckie, of Toronto, and Major Basil Deacon Hobbs, of Sault Ste. Marie. The trans-Canada expedition was an epic venture, lasting 11 days and requiring six aircraft. The third leg was flown non-stop from the Canadian capital, Ottawa, to Sault Ste. Marie, Ontario, with North Bay as a checkpoint. (Note: Coincidental to the future air force base, the F.3 was a descendant of the Felixstowe F.2a and Curtiss H-12 flying boats employed by the Royal Naval Air Service and Royal Air Force in the First World War as interceptors against German Zeppelin and Schuette-Lanz airships. During the war, only 12 airships were shot down by British and Commonwealth flyers. Between them Hobbs and Leckie had three. On 14 June 1917, Hobbs shot down German Naval Airship Division Zeppelin L 43. Leckie was the war's top airship hunter; he engaged eight Zeppelins, shot down two (L 22 and L 70, on 14 May 1917 and 5 August 1918), and killed the commander of the German airship fleet, Fregattenkapitan Peter Strasser. Strasser's loss, a national hero, devastated the German public, still mourning the death of Manfred von Richthofen. A third Zeppelin (L 65) escaped destruction when Leckie's gun jammed.) Leckie's and Hobbs's encounter with North Bay was fleeting. They arrived without warning, approaching out of the east, catching residents unaware. Few had seen an aircraft before; the effect was electrifying, akin to the Space Shuttle appearing suddenly over the city today. Leckie steered for the downtown. Over the Canadian Pacific Railway station he dropped a signal to be telegraphed to the Air Board in Ottawa, "Making a good 50 miles per hour", then with a wave to lunchtime onlookers, the pilots swung their F.3 out over nearby Lake Nipissing, onwards to Sault Ste. Marie.

No photos were taken of the North Bay overflight; this image of the F.3 was shot shortly afterwards, upon arrival at the Red River, Manitoba. Department of National Defence photo.

The overflight planted interest in local politicians, businessmen and community leaders towards aviation, particularly the establishment of an air station at North Bay. (Note: An "air station" was the term used in Canada in 1919-early 1920s for any land- or water-based aerodrome.) In the summer of 1921, a Government of Canada Curtiss HS-2L flying boat, taking on exploration and aerial survey work, landed at North Bay, on Lake Nipissing. The HS-2L landed on Lake Nipissing and Trout Lake (on the eastern periphery of North Bay) in 1922, for further aerial surveying as well as cargo and passenger transport. These flights amplified this interest and a campaign to the federal government for an aerodrome commenced.

On 1 January 1923, the Department of National Defence (DND) took over responsibility and control over military and (until 2 November 1936) civil aviation in Canada. Over the next decade-and-half Canadian Air Force (as of 1 April 1924, "Royal Canadian Air Force") Squadron Leader John Henry Tudhope, a South African-born First World War fighter pilot, almost single-handedly laid down the network of aviation in Canada, exploring and surveying the country for the construction of aerodromes and establishment of air routes for the Trans-Canada Air Lines system, essentially a national air highway network. Considering that Canada was nearly the size of Europe and mostly raw, primal wilderness, Tudhope's undertaking was staggering. In 1930, S/L Tudhope received the McKee Trophy for his endeavours, the premier aviation award in Canada.

In 1928, Tudhope stopped twice at North Bay, and again in 1931 and 1932. Based on his exploration and survey work in the Northern Ontario region, in June 1933 DND set up a headquarters in North Bay to supervise construction of emergency landing fields for the Ottawa to Port Arthur (now Thunder Bay) portion of the Trans-Canada Airway system. An 18-man unit operated out of the Dominion Rubber Company building, leased on Oak Street, downtown North Bay, which served as their headquarters, supply depot and living quarters. Unemployed men in each local district were hired as labour. Despite the primal ruggedness of Northern Ontario, by July 1936, eight airfields had been hacked out of the wilderness, at Reay, Diver, Emsdale, South River, Ramore, Porquis Junction, Gilles Depot and Tudhope (named after the squadron leader), and the unit was disbanded. Most of these airfields have since been abandoned to the wild. Ironically, although the nucleus of the operation, and recommended by S/L Tudhope in June 1936, North Bay was not considered as a site for an aerodrome.

The first air force aircraft to land at North Bay arrived 17 to 23 May 1930. Eight Royal Canadian Air Force (RCAF) flying boats stopped temporarily at Trout Lake during flights west. Two were en route to Winnipeg; two to Lake Athabasca, Saskatchewan; four to Northern Saskatchewan. This plus the landing field construction described above prompted local politicians, businessmen and community leaders to intensify their years-long campaign to the Canadian government for an airport. At issue was money; who would finance the project. On 21 March 1938, their perseverance paid off. The Canadian government approved expenditure of funds to build an airport at North Bay. The Province of Ontario and City of North Bay would provide the land. It would be a Trans-Canada Air Lines (TCA) facility; TCA was the country's government-operated air line (and forerunner of Air Canada).

On 27 April 1938, work began. The first unofficial landing by two area residents in a de Havilland DH.60 Moth took place on 4 July 1938, in the midst of construction. The first official landing occurred 30 September 1938, by Squadron Leader Robert Dodds, RCAF, to inspect the work. A Royal Flying Corps fighter pilot during the First World War, and close associate of Squadron Leader Tudhope during the latter's exploration and survey of Canada, Dodds had been seconded by DND to the Department of Transport as Inspector of Airways and Aerodromes for the country. On 28 November 1938, the long sought after airport was ready to receive aircraft; due to bad weather regular passenger service at the facility did not begin until May 1939.

=== Second World War ===
The air base opened in 1951.

In October 1939, the Canadian government announced that North Bay's fledgling airport, open less than 12 months, was in contention as a British Empire Air Training Plan site. The BEATP (eventually renamed the "British Commonwealth Air Training Plan", or "BCATP") was the biggest international military aircrew training operation in history. There were more aircrew training schools in Britain, but the BCATP taught and evaluated 131,553 pilot, navigator, observer, wireless (radio) operator, air gunner, wireless air gunner and flight engineer recruits from around the world, plus 5,296 graduates from Royal Air Force (RAF) schools.

North Bay's location presented an allure for air training. It was far from major built-up areas and its skies uncluttered by air traffic, altogether a reasonably safe arena for young aircrew hopefuls attempting to learn the tricky art of military flying. In 1940 a small glass "greenhouse" was constructed atop the airport's administration building in anticipation of air traffic control, necessary to handle the sudden proliferation of aircraft. But the government decided not to include North Bay in the training scheme.

The airport's sole service to the air force over the next two years was essentially like a roadside truckstop, providing fuel, rest and meals to aircrew flying across the country. By 1942 so many aircraft were stopping at North Bay that No. 124 Squadron, RCAF, set up a seven-man detachment at the airport. Under the command of a Flying Officer (today's rank, Lieutenant), two aeroengine mechanics, an electrician and an airframe mechanic re-fuelled, serviced and repaired the aircraft. A driver and vehicle mechanic saw to the detachment's staff car, aircraft towing tractor and 1,000-imperial-gallon (4,500 L; 1,200 US gal) fuel truck. The staff car was eventually replaced by a more practical "Truck, Panel, Delivery".

The biggest impact on the airport during the war was delivered by the Royal Air Force (RAF). In November 1940 a grand, dangerous experiment had been conducted. Masses of new, desperately needed aircraft shipped from Canada and Newfoundland for the war effort in Britain were being lost in the Atlantic Ocean, their cargo vessels sunk by German U-boats. To reduce these losses an idea was proposed to ferry aircraft instead—fly them over the ocean. It was a breath-taking proposal. In 1940 transoceanic flying was raw and new. Aircrew had no navigation aids to steer by except the sun, moon and stars. Search and rescue beyond the coasts of North America, Ireland and Britain was nonexistent. Mechanical and electrical breakdowns in aircraft were common. In an emergency there was nowhere to land except the North Atlantic.

Nevertheless, on the evening of 10 November 1940, the experiment began; seven twin-engine Lockheed Hudson light bombers lifted off from Gander, Newfoundland en route for Britain. The odds were deemed so poor that only four of the bombers were expected to succeed. Yet the following morning, engines sucking their last gallons of fuel, all seven bombers arrived safely in Northern Ireland.

Inspired, the Royal Air Force commenced large-scale ferrying of aircraft. A training school for ferry aircrews was set up at Dorval, Quebec, outside Montreal, but by 1942 Dorval's airspace had become crowded with military aircraft. A new training site was set up at North Bay, taking advantage of the uncluttered skies and freedom from major built-up areas that had made the airport an ideal BEATP/BCATP candidate.

On 1 June 1942, ground around the airport was cleared and tents set up for RAF Ferry Command's Trans-Atlantic Training Unit. Five Hudson bombers arrived shortly afterwards. Over the next three years, the unit—renamed No. 313 Ferry Training Unit in 1943—taught hundreds of aircrew, in three to four-week courses, the techniques and procedures of transatlantic flying, and how to solve in-flight problems and emergencies. The size of the unit isn't known. However, although a formal air base hadn't been established, the RAF expanded the airport dramatically. A new double hangar was built (still in use today), as well as a Works and Stores Building (i.e., Supply), guard house, salvage store, recreation building, hospital, fire station and fire protective system, coal compound and general purpose building.

The Canadian Department of Transport added water and power supply systems, plus provided clearing and grading for the hangars, aprons and roads.

In 1943, three air traffic controllers were posted to the airport—the first ATC at North Bay—to coordinate airfield flying operations from the glass "greenhouse" built atop the admin building in 1940.

Nine more Hudsons joined the original five, along with two North American B-25 Mitchell bombers and a de Havilland Tiger Moth biplane. Avro Lancaster heavy bombers, de Havilland Mosquitos and Douglas Dakota transports were taken on in 1944.

Allied aircrew at North Bay's airport, 1943, part of their three- to four-week Royal Air Force trans-oceanic flying training. The vast Canadian wilderness served as an excellent and safe stand-in for the Atlantic Ocean.

The RAF personnel became part of the North Bay Community.

In September 1945, with the war over, the RCAF detachment disbanded. No. 313 Ferry Training Unit followed suit in October. Their facilities were donated to the Canadian government. Mass flying finished, the air traffic controllers were posted out and North Bay's airport returned to its sleepy, low-key pre-war state, and so it would remain until birth of the air base in 1951.

Despite the thousands of military flights transiting through North Bay and training for trans-oceanic flying, there were only 11 crashes, with only one being fatal. On 28 April 1945, a No. 313 Ferry Training Unit B-25 Mitchell crashed, killing pilots Flying Officer Leslie William Laurence Davies of England and Flight Sergeant William Gribbin of Scotland. Both men are buried in North Bay cemeteries. This was also the first fatal crash of an aircraft, civilian or military, at North Bay's airport and in the North Bay area.

== RCAF Station North Bay ==
Royal Canadian Air Force Station North Bay was founded on 1 September 1951, part of the expansion of Canada's air defences in face of the rising threat of nuclear air attack from the Soviet Union. Canada, by virtue of its geography, was presented with an unpleasant situation. No sooner had the Second World War ended than friction between the Soviet Union and Western countries began, rapidly heated up, and spread around the globe, raising the spectre of a Third World War. Called the "Cold War", both sides had weapons pointed at each other—by 1949 nuclear weapons. The main adversaries were the Soviet Union and the United States. Canada lay between the two, meaning Soviet bombers would cross Canadian territory to strike at the United States, while U.S. fighters would swarm Canada to shoot them down. Whether the country liked it or not, in a war it would become a major nuclear battleground. For this reason, plus its long-standing friendship with the United States, Canada embarked on a nationwide development of its air defences, dovetailed with America's expansion of its own defences (which included building and manning numerous air defence radar sites on Canadian soil). North Bay's air force base was a piece of this development.

Created in 1960 and authorized by Queen Elizabeth in 1961, it is the only Canadian Armed Forces badge that uses the logo of its neighbouring civilian community, specifically the City of North Bay's gateway.

A massive building campaign began in 1951 around North Bay's tiny airport, including construction of an additional, larger double hangar; a proper control tower; air traffic control radio and radar systems; and fuel, oil, lubricant and weapons facilities for military aircraft; plus improvements to the runways, taxiways and aprons. In fact, North Bay was outfitted with a 10,000-foot runway, one of the longest in Canada, for reasons other than air defence: during war, the base was also a designated recovery site for American bombers returning damaged and/or short of fuel from nuclear strikes on the Soviet Union. A side effect of having this runway, decades later North Bay was selected as an emergency site for NASA's Space Shuttle, and periodically, due to the long runway and relatively isolated location, free of air traffic and built-up areas, plus security offered by the military, NASA used North Bay's airfield for research into different fields of aviation.

Across Airport Road, the main route to the airfield from the City of North Bay, the rugged Northern Ontario terrain was cleared and the support infrastructure for the station built—headquarters, barracks, dining hall, messes, hospital, gym, motor pool, supply, firehall, RCAF police guardhouse, Protestant and Roman Catholic chapels, married quarters for air force families, and much more. The majority of facilities donated to the airfield by the British when the Royal Air Force departed at the end of the Second World War were demolished and replaced.

The base had the biggest impact on the community since the linking of railways with North Bay in the early 20th century. Construction, services and contracts for the base infused millions of dollars into the community, and by the end of November 1953 the RCAF station was the leading employer in the area: 1,018 military personnel plus over 160 civilians. This status would continue for four decades, until the departure of the last flying squadron from North Bay in 1992 and subsequent downsizing of the air base. At its peak, the air base had a strength of about 2,200 military and civilian personnel. (Base strength, as of June 2011, was 540 Regular Force, 77 Reserve Force, 34 United States Air Force and over 100 civilian personnel.)

=== No. 3 All-Weather (Fighter) Operational Training Unit ===
The air base's raison d'etre was (and still is) air defence. On 1 October 1951, one month after RCAF Station North Bay's official birth, No. 3 All-Weather (Fighter) Operational Training Unit was formed at the base. No. 3 AW(F)OTU was a state-of-the-art school teaching military flying, interception and fighter combat in all weather conditions, day or night—cutting-edge techniques in 1951. Students came from as far away as New Zealand. The instructors were among the world's elite in air defence. The unit's second Officer Commanding (OC) was Wing Commander Edward Crew, Royal Air Force. (Note: W/C Crew was the recipient of two Distinguished Service Orders (DSO) and two Distinguished Flying Crosses (DFC) for his leadership, courage and daring in the Second World War, which included shooting down 21 V-1 "Flying Bombs".) Crew was replaced in 1954 by another Englishman, Wing Commander Robert Braham. (Note: Serving in the RAF, Braham had received three DSOs, three DFCs, plus the Air Force Cross (AFC), and was the top nightfighter ace among British and Commonwealth pilots in the Second World War, credited with 29 1/2 victories, one probable and six damaged enemy aircraft. Braham retired from the RAF in May 1952 and joined the RCAF.) Crew and Braham also commanded RCAF Station North Bay for brief periods. No. 3 AW(F)OTU transferred to RCAF Station Cold Lake in mid-1955.

Among No. 3 AW(F)OTU's instructors were the first Americans to serve at North Bay's air base: USAF Major John Eiser and Captain B. Delosier, arriving 9 January 1952. Americans have continued to serve at North Bay in one military capacity or another into the 21st Century.

In 1952 No. 3 AW(F)OTU adopted the nickname "Night Witches", suggested by the wife of the unit's Engineering Officer, and the orange and black logo seen on the nose of this CF-100 interceptor trainer, denoting its all-weather day-or-night operations. Department of National Defence image, courtesy 22 Wing Heritage Office Archives.

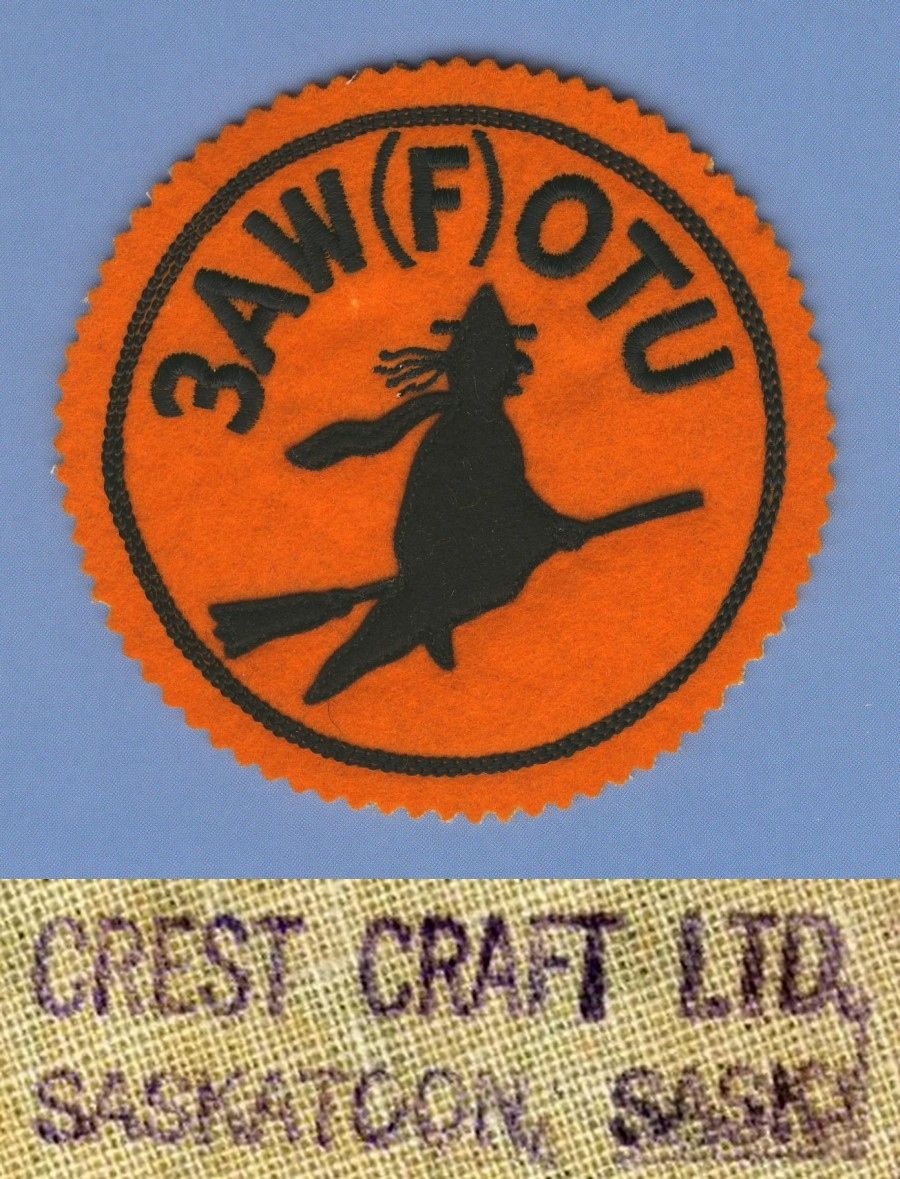
A Squadron shoulder patch used by RCAF Aircrew with 3 AW(F)OTU in the late 50s. The back-stamp confirms the Crest was manufactured by Crest Craft and was only found on crests manufactured between 1957 through 1959.

=== Fighter squadrons ===
The sole purpose of the air force base at North Bay is air defence, to monitor and protect the skies. At first this was limited to around North Bay, then expanded to the Northern Ontario area of Canada, then east, central and Arctic Canada, and finally all of Canada, the latter an area the size of Europe. Between the base's birth in 1951 to 1964, as well as the operational training unit, it was home to a succession of combat units devoted to this purpose.

Five fighter interceptor squadrons served at North Bay. In succession, 430 Squadron (5 November 1951 to 27 September 1952), 445 Squadron (1 April to 31 August 1953), 419 Squadron (15 March 1954 to 1 August 1957), 433 Squadron (15 October 1955 to 1 August 1961) and 414 Squadron (1 August 1957 to 30 June 1964).

430 Squadron flew Canadair Sabre Mark II fighters, plus T-33 Silver Star jet trainers and propeller-driven North American Harvards for training. While at North Bay, the squadron was commanded by James "Stocky" Edwards, a decorated fighter pilot. (Note: Edwards received the Distinguished Flying Cross and bar, Distinguished Flying Medal, Mention in Dispatches (and, eventually, the Order of Canada). During the Second World War, he shot down 19 enemy aircraft. In the North African campaign, although a Flight Sergeant, Edwards periodically led his unit, No. 260 Squadron, RAF, into battle, a function normally reserved for an officer. During one flying operation, his wingman, nominally a subordinate position in a formation, was the United States Army Air Force lieutenant-colonel commanding the U.S. 57th Fighter Group.)

North Bay's next fighter unit, 445 Squadron, was the first in the world armed with the Avro CF-100 Canuck interceptor. The CF-100 was one of two combat aircraft designed and built entirely in Canada, and the only one to enter air force service. It had the ability to hunt other aircraft in any weather, night or day, making the CF-100 the preeminent interceptor among global air forces when it began service with the Royal Canadian Air Force in 1952. Nos. 419, 433 and 414 Squadrons also flew CF-100 interceptors. CF-100s also flew with the RCAF in Europe on NATO deployments.

North Bay's last fighter unit, 414 Squadron, was re-armed with the CF-101 Voodoo in 1962, flying the jet fighters in air defence until the squadron was disbanded in 1964.

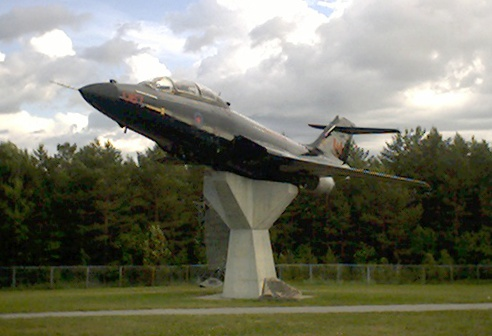
Retired EF-101B "Electric Voodoo" on pedestal at the main gate to CFB North Bay.

In addition to its fighter squadrons, from September 1956 – September 1960, North Bay operated a CF-100 Staging Detachment at Lakehead Airport in Fort William, Ontario. A pair of CF-100 interceptors from the base were deployed, or "staged", at the Lakehead to defend the Northwest Ontario and Manitoba regions of the country.

In September 1960 and on 14 October 1961—the date of this photo at RCAF Station North Bay—NORAD conducted Exercise Sky Shield. Practicing to respond to an attack on North America, all civilian aircraft in Canada and the United States were ordered grounded, and remained at that status for hours, while over 1,800 NORAD interceptors took part in 6,000 sorties. It was the largest airborne military exercise in history. Department of National Defence image.

In 1960 the staging detachment was changed from a fighter to a TACAN (Tactical Air Navigation) unit. RCAF Station North Bay also operated a second TACAN unit at Kapuskasing, in Northern Ontario. "TACAN" is a radio navigation beacon that helps military aircrew determine their location and direction of flight. In the 1950s and 1960s it was an indispensable aid when traversing the vast Canadian wilderness landscape. Flight computers in aircraft then were primitive compared to modern counterparts, and navigation-assistance systems such as the Global Positioning System (GPS) did not exist. To get lost over Canada presented airmen with the prospect of running out of fuel and having to eject or crash-land in some of the wildest territory in North America. Wrecks and bodies were sometimes not found for weeks, months or years; some have never been found. To give an idea of the roughness of the Canadian wilderness: even though authorities knew the general location, it took four years to find a rocket pod full of live rockets that had jettisoned from a jet fighter in 1958 when a switch malfunctioned.

Both of North Bay's TACAN units were disbanded in the 1960s, but TACAN sites are still found throughout the country today, some providing assistance to civilian as well as military aviators.

A concern for northern and bush operations in Canada was in identifying the Magnetic North Pole, benchmark for all land, sea and air compasses in the northern hemisphere. The exact position of the Magnetic North Pole was not pinpointed until flyers from 22 Wing in 1948 plotted the exact position. At that point, 22 Wing was a photographic flying unit stationed at CFB Rockcliffe, Ontario, mapping and charting the country, separate from and unrelated to the air base at North Bay.

=== 131 Composite Unit and the temporary end of military flying at North Bay ===
414 Squadron, North Bay's last fighter squadron, was disbanded in June 1964, partly due to government cuts to the RCAF, and partly due to a change in the strategy for the air defence of North America, that Soviet nuclear-weapon armed bombers should be stopped as far from the North American landmass as possible. Better to fight the war (especially one of nuclear weapons) over the ocean rather than over home territory; North Bay was deemed too far from the coast for its fighters to be useful in this strategy.

414 Squadron's departure left 131 Composite Unit as the sole flying unit at the base. Formed on 1 July 1962, 131 Composite Unit was a "catch-all" organization that flew two-seat T-33 Silver Star jet trainers and propeller-engine Beech C-45 Expeditor and Douglas C-47/CC-129 Dakota transports. As well as hauling cargo and personnel, the unit provided targets for training of RCAF interceptor aircrews, and were used by pilots and navigators on the Northern NORAD Region headquarters staff, at the base, to maintain their flying skills.

131 Composite Unit was disbanded in November 1967. For the next five years, except for occasional visits by aircraft from other air force bases, all military flying at North Bay ceased. One of the hangars, once packed with jet interceptors, was converted into an ice arena for the City of North Bay. The only air defence activity at the base in this five-year period was in NORAD's famous Underground Complex (described below).

== Air Defence Ground Units and installations at North Bay ==
Air defence ground units are those air defence organizations not equipped with aircraft. The majority are devoted to searching for, identifying, and keeping track of aircraft in the sky, and coordinating with fighters to intercept aircraft that either cannot be identified; are suspicious; require assistance; participating in criminal activity; intruding in sovereign airspace; or have been declared hostile.

Surface-to-air missile (SAM) squadrons like the BOMARCs in Canada during the 1960s and early 1970s are also considered air defence ground units. SAMs of course are used only in war, or if an isolated attack (such as the 9/11 attacks) is made during peacetime.

In war, the air defence ground units monitoring the skies may use surface-to-air missiles as well as fighters to intercept and shoot down hostile aircraft and any air-to-surface missiles (ASMs) launched by those aircraft (especially since ASMs launched against countries or a continent are usually nuclear-tipped, aimed to destroy cities, military bases and industrial installations).

CFB North Bay is responsible for the air defence of Canada's skies, and, with the United States, the skies over the Canadian-U.S. portion of the North American continent, an airspace about twice the size of Europe.

=== 6 Aircraft Control & Warning Unit ===
North Bay's first air defence ground unit was 6 Aircraft Control & Warning Unit (abbreviated as "6 AC&WU"). Created on 4 February 1952, just four months after the base was born, the unit was equipped with Second World War-vintage British Air Ministry Experimental System (AMES) 11C radar equipment. Intended to be mobile, to move and operate wherever the air force needed it, 6 AC&WU worked inside a handful of van-size trucks. It stood sentinel over the skies in a circle of about 120 miles (190 kilometers) centered on the base at North Bay; its assignments were to detect all aircraft entering this area; evaluate who they were and if they posed a threat; provide early warning to RCAF Station North Bay of hostile, suspicious and unidentified aircraft; and guide the air station's jet fighters by radio to intercept these aircraft.

6 AC&WU's strength comprised three officers and 32 Other Ranks. The latter including 19 airwomen, the first time in Royal Canadian Air Force history women were allowed to work in air defence.

In March 1952 it was decided that 6 AC&WU would not be using its mobility, and the ground air defence unit was transferred out of its trucks into a building on the base.

"Ground Controlled Interception", or "GCI", was a major function of the base, providing air force personnel in a ground station, like a radar site or an air defence command and control centre with the systems to guide fighters to intercept an aircraft. The ground control is done by radio. The usual method is the ground controller and the interceptor's aircrew talk to each other. In the past, on occasion – such as with the CF-101 Voodoo interceptor – the information could sometimes be transmitted to the fighter by datalink. Datalink sends information to the fighter's crew by the press of a button at a console in the ground station rather than a controller speaking to the aircrew, loosely similar to how WiFi sends data to computers today. Datalink has the advantage that, since no words are spoken, an enemy can't eavesdrop into the radio frequency and listen to what the ground controller and aircrew are doing and planning. Despite this advantage, the majority of GCI practiced by air forces around the world was (and still is) done by the ground controller and the aircrew talking over the radio.

On 15 April 1952, 6 AC&WU carried out the first GCI at North Bay, a training session to evaluate the unit's people and radar equipment. The unit's ground controllers guided a No. 3 All-Weather (Fighter) Operational Training Unit jet interceptor against one of the operational training unit's twin-engine C-45 Expeditor transports. From the success of this and subsequent training, on 15 May 1952, 6 Aircraft Control & Warning Unit began around-the-clock air defence operations, working with 430 Squadron Sabre jet fighters for the defence of the North Bay area. It was the first small step in North Bay's gradual expansion to overseeing the air defence of the entire country.

6 AC&WU continued as part of the base until 1 December 1952, when it was reassigned to a new, large radar station being built at Falconbridge, Ontario, about 65 miles (105 kilometres) west of North Bay. Renamed "33 Aircraft Control & Warning Squadron Detachment", the unit remained at North Bay for seven more months, defending the area, until the end of May 1953, when Falconbridge was finally ready to assume control of air defence in its region of Canada. (Falconbridge watched a circle of sky about 400 miles in diameter, about 640 kilometres, a dramatic improvement over 6 AC&WU.)

=== Ground Observer Corps ===
Between June 1953 and May 1960, two RCAF Ground Observer Corps groups operated in North Bay: 5 Ground Observer Corps Unit and 50 Ground Observer Corps Detachment. 5 Ground Observer Corps Unit was set up in a leased commercial building in the heart of the City of North Bay. Commanded by an RCAF squadron leader, and manned by RCAF personnel as well as seven paid civilian employees, it oversaw Ground Observer Corps Detachments and Observation Posts in Ontario at North Bay, Brockville, London and Peterborough, and at Winnipeg, Manitoba.

Many GObC volunteers went to great lengths in the enthusiasm for their operations, such building this tower. Department of National Defence image.

While 6 AC&WU had defended airspace in the vicinity of a single city, 5 Ground Observer Corps Unit was watching the skies over all of Ontario, part of Manitoba and a slice of western Quebec, an area larger than France, Belgium and the Netherlands combined. The scope of the Unit's operations is illustrated by one 1958 air defence exercise that involved 14,000 civilian volunteers and military personnel and over 60 aircraft.

50 Ground Observer Corps Detachment and its filter centre belonged to 5 Ground Observer Corps Unit. Opened on 30 June 1953 by Air Vice Marshal Arthur James, Commander of the RCAF's Air Defence Command, the Detachment and its centre were installed in a converted ex-movie theatre in the Sibbett Building, a well-known downtown North Bay City landmark, and were responsible for surveillance of the skies and providing early warning of hostile aircraft in north-central Ontario, an area roughly the size of England, Scotland and Wales. Along with an RCAF Commanding Officer, a small RCAF staff, and 1 or 2 paid civilians, a large contingent of unpaid civilian volunteers were employed at the Detachment and its centre, hired through newspaper advertisements and recruiting drives at such places as movie theatres and department stores. Despite the heavy reliance on civilian volunteers, the Detachment and centre were round-the-clock operations, and trained exhaustively how to respond to a Soviet air attack, such as in the military exercise mentioned above.

The problem with the Ground Observer Corps and its filter centres is that they largely mirrored the air defences of the Battle of Britain, 1940. They relied heavily on "eyeball" reports of aircraft, a particular conundrum if an air attack was made at night, in bad weather, or dense cloud cover when visibility was severely hampered or nonexistent. In the filter centres, aircraft movements were marked by plots hand-pushed atop giant map tables. In an age of jet aircraft and nuclear weapons this process was achingly slow and woefully unreliable. In May 1960 the Corps and its filter centres south of the 55th Parallel (including those in North Bay) were disbanded, rendered obsolete by NORAD's new computerized SAGE system and the (then) state-of-the-art Distant Early Warning, Mid-Canada Line and Pinetree Line radar networks. (Note: SAGE stands for "Semi-Automatic Ground Environment", a 1950s-era network of computer systems providing the ground environment for the larger air defense system with buildings, radars, and defense aircraft in North America.) The Ground Observer Corps north of the 55th Parallel was retained for four more years, due to the value to NORAD and RCAF Air Defence Command of observations phoned or radioed in of aircraft spotted crossing the north. In January 1964 the northern operations were ended, and the Ground Observer Corps finally disbanded.

== NORAD and the Underground Complex ==
During the Cold War, Canada found itself in an unenviable geographic position, lying directly between the Cold War's principal adversaries, the Soviet Union and United States. This meant if the war turned "hot", Canada would become a major nuclear battleground: to reach their American targets—cities, military bases and industrial installations—Soviet nuclear weapon–armed bombers would have to cross Canadian airspace, while U.S. interceptors would swarm Canadian airspace to shoot the attackers down (and vice versa).

On 12 September 1957, Canada and the U.S. formed NORAD, the North American Air Defence Command, an organization that unified the two countries' air defences into a single, coordinated, fast-reacting, continent-wide network. Both the Commander-in-Chief of NORAD and the deputy commander are able to access the highest levels of the U.S. and Canadian militaries and national governments. Canadian and American NORAD personnel work at each other's bases and installations, performing the same defence duties.

The NORAD Agreement was officially signed by both nations on 12 May 1958. The name was altered to North American Aerospace Defense Command, 12 May 1981, to more accurately reflect the extent of command's responsibilities, keeping watch of activities in space over North America as well as those inside the Earth's atmosphere.

By virtue of Canada's frontline position, the Canadian air defence command and control centre was deemed the most important piece of the NORAD "pie", with respect to bombers. (North Bay was never involved in ballistic missile defence.) Its early warning of and reaction against a Soviet nuclear air attack were critical for the survival of the U.S.-Canadian portion of the North American continent. As one air force officer put it: "(regarding a bomber attack) We lose North Bay, we lose the continent." Ergo, the centre was a prime target for a Soviet nuclear strike. To minimize the possibility of its destruction, planners decided to build the facility underground. It would be the only subterranean regional command and control centre in NORAD.

Following a cross-Canada survey of candidate sites, North Bay was selected for the following reasons:

1. An air force base existed, eliminating the need to build one.
2. The City of North Bay was a crossroad of rail, highway and telecommunications.
3. The geology comprised a 2.6 billion year old rock formation altered 1.5 billion years ago by the Grenville Metamorphic Event into granite, one of the hardest rock types on the planet, excellent armour against a nuclear strike.
4. Trout Lake, on the eastern edge of the city, presented an abundant source of water needed to cool the complex.

=== Construction of the Underground Complex ===
Construction of the Underground Complex (UGC) took four years, August 1959 to September 1963: 1 1/2 years for excavation; 2 1/2 years to build and outfit the centre. The cost was $51,000,000. One-third was paid by Canada, two-thirds by the U.S. Situated 60 storeys beneath the surface of the Earth (600 feet (180 meters)—deeper underground than most of the buildings in Toronto are tall—the facility was specially designed to withstand a 4-megaton nuclear blast, 267 times more powerful than the bomb dropped at Hiroshima.

Because its subterranean location complicated access by firefighting vehicles and personnel, the complex was fashioned from fire-retardant and fireproof materials, making it one of the most fire-safe structures in the country.

The complex (which still exists) comprises two sections. The "Main Installation" is a three-storey, figure-eight-shaped building inside a 131 meters (430 feet) long, 70.1 meters (230 feet),wide, 16 meters (52 feet) (5.4 storey) high cave. The "Power Cavern", which provides life support and utility services to the complex, is a 122.23 meters (401.0 feet) long, 15.24 meters (50.0 feet) wide, 8.2-meter (27-foot) (2.7 storey) high chamber.

Access to the complex is via a 6,600-foot-long (2,012 meter) North Tunnel from the air base, and a 3,150-foot-long (960 meter) South Tunnel from the city. The tunnels meet; the idea was if a nuclear weapon struck the air base the blast would shoot down the North Tunnel and out the South Tunnel, minimizing blast damage to the complex and its structures. In fact, the three-storey Main Installation is mounted off the ground on specially designed pillars (not springs) to reduce seismic shock—on 1 January 2000, North Bay was hit by an earthquake registering 5.2 on the Richter magnitude scale, yet occupants in the Main Installation did not feel a thing.

As an added measure against damage from a nuclear blast, as well as for the security of the installation, the complex is situated behind three 19-ton steel bank vault-type doors. The doors are normally kept open, and shut in times of emergency. Despite weighing as much as a medium-size bulldozer, each door is so well balanced it can be moved effortlessly by a 12-year-old child.

=== Features of the Underground Complex ===
Air defence operations officially began in the UGC on 1 October 1963, and continued around-the-clock, unabated for 43 years until October 2006. There was nothing like it in NORAD (the Cheyenne Mountain Complex did not officially open until 1966) or in Canada, and it attracted worldwide interest. Its opening was reported in newspapers throughout the United States; it was the subject of numerous engineering publications; and visitors included the commander of the Japanese Air Self Defense Force, commander of the Royal New Zealand Air Force, and Emperor Haile Selassie of Ethiopia In its heyday about 700 Canadian and American military and civilian personnel worked in the centre, in day jobs and shift work. As well as air defence facilities, the Main Installation encompassed a barber shop, small medical centre, gym, cafeteria, chaplain's office, and other amenities for the complex's personnel (important since the complex was designed to seal up in time of war), plus a command post, intelligence centre, briefing rooms, a telephone switching network large enough to handle a town of 30,000 people, and a national civil defence warning centre.

When sealed up, the Underground Complex could support 400 people for upwards of four weeks cut off from the outside world. Since Canada would be the front line for the air defence of North America if the Cold War turned "hot", it was crucial to ensure that air defence operations would continue as long as possible. A critical factor was electrical power. The complex gets its power from the outside civilian hydro-electric grid. In the event of a power failure, such as the August 2003 blackout that hobbled the northeast United States and Canada, two banks of 194 batteries automatically switch on and provide electricity to the complex while an electrical generator is readied to take the load. Once a generator is running, it can power the complex without stopping as long as it has fuel. The generator can also power key air base buildings on the Earth's surface. Originally the complex had six 750-kilowatt generators. These were replaced in the 1990s by three 1.2-megawatt generators. Both types of generators could run on diesel or natural gas. If the Cold War had turned "hot", and the complex sealed airtight and forced to use its generators for electrical power, the facility's NORAD commander faced a harrowing choice. The original 750-kilowatt generators devoured air voraciously; in the sealed up environment of the complex, instead of weeks the generators would have cut life support for the complex's personnel to a mere few hours, as the machines sucked away the breathable atmosphere. The commander could limit use of the generators to prolong his personnel's survival, but a nuclear air attack would have demanded maximum power from all of the generators to support the complex's air defence computers and electronics in order to repel the invaders, i.e. the commander and his personnel would be dead in hours. Luckily a crisis that called for such a choice to be made never arose during the Underground Complex's 43 years.

The Underground Complex is colloquially referred to as "The Hole". Although officially titled the Combat Centre/Direction Centre (CC/DC) Installation when it began air defence operations, during its construction it was known as the "SAGE Installation, North Bay", a term still often used today. Canada and the United States combined are roughly twice the size of Europe—a Battle of Britain-style air defence network was too slow and unwieldy to protect such vast airspace in an age of jet aircraft and nuclear weapons. SAGE was a massive computer system that linked the ground elements of Canadian and American air defence—such as command and control centres, radar sites, and headquarters—providing high speed detection of aircraft, assistance in their rapid identification, and, when required, aiding quick Ground Controlled Interception of unknown, suspicious and hostile aircraft. Also, the SAGE system enabled the different NORAD regions and NORAD headquarters to interact seamlessly in their air defence activities and crises.

The Underground Complex's SAGE computer equipment comprised a pair of computers, nicknamed "Bonnie and Clyde", plus Maintenance & Programming and Input & Output areas. Combined, "Bonnie and Clyde" weighed 275 tons (245.5 metric tonnes); encompassed 11,900 square feet of floor space (.273 acres, 1,105.5 square meters—the floorspace of a dozen small houses); and had a (then) staggering memory capacity of about 256K. When the Maintenance & Programming and Input & Output areas are included, total floor space used by SAGE was 18,810 sq ft (1,747.5 sq m – equal in size to about 20 small homes).

In 1982–1983, the SAGE computer system was replaced throughout NORAD by the "Regional Operations Control Centre/Sector Operations Control Centre" computer system. This long-winded term is abbreviated "ROCC/SOCC". It was a faster, more versatile and, in particular, substantially smaller system. North Bay's ROCC/SOCC total computer components took up the floor space equal to about two houses versus 20 for SAGE. North Bay's SAGE computer system was also tied into Canada's BOMARC nuclear-tipped air defence missiles. Cost to convert systems in North Bay was $96,000,000.

The ROCC/SOCC system remained in use in North Bay until air defence operations were moved out of the Underground Complex, in October 2006. The ROCC/SOCC system, better known as the FYQ-93 by the technicians who maintained it, was officially powered down by the last Aerospace Telecommunications and Information Systems Technician (ATIS Tech) to work on the system, Sergeant (then Corporal) Michael A. Dambrauskas. A ceremonial Shutdown was later performed by one of the ROCC/SOCC's longest serving technicians, Master Warrant Officer (MWO) Jean-Pierre Paris.

Due to its important, sensitive role in the security of Canada and North America, working in the Underground Complex was limited to very few people. Over its 43-year span in air defence operations only about 17,000 Canadian and American military personnel and civilians served in the UGC. Of this number approximately 15,500 were Canadians, out of nearly a million men and women over the same timeframe who were members of Canada's Department of National Defence.

=== NORAD regions at North Bay ===
The Canada-United States portion of North America is colossal, about twice the size of Europe. To enable thorough, in-depth air defence operations over such a vast territory, NORAD divided its organization into divisions and regions. Each division and region was responsible to NORAD Headquarters in Colorado Springs for watching over and protecting the air sovereignty in their geographic chunk of Canada and/or the United States.

The Underground Complex was home to three successive NORAD regions. Each region was the largest in NORAD's organization. The first was the "Northern NORAD Region (NNR)", created with the formation of NORAD in 1957. Originally set up at Air Defence Command, at RCAF Station St. Hubert, an air base just south of Montreal, Quebec, the NNR was transferred to North Bay in 1962–1963 to operate in the then new Underground Complex. The NNR's area of responsibility comprised the north, Atlantic and east-central airspaces of Canada, the frontline "trenches" of North America with respect to the Soviet Union, as well as the northern two-thirds of the state of Maine.

American NORAD regions oversaw air security for the rest of Canada. Because of the severe nature of the Cold War, everything that flew into the Northern NORAD Region had to be identified within two minutes by Underground Complex air defence personnel. If an aircraft was still unknown at two minutes, fighters were scrambled to intercept it, to find out why the aircraft could not be identified. If necessary, the fighters would force the aircraft to land at the nearest airfield, and the aircraft met by authorities. If hostile, the aircraft would be shot down.

From receiving notification from North Bay to scramble, the jet fighters had to be airborne within five minutes. Under certain conditions, 15 minutes or even one hour was permitted, but five minutes was the norm. To meet this requirement, jet fighters were positioned at air force bases across Canada and in Maine, fully fuelled and fully armed, 24 hours a day/seven days per week. They, and their pilots, were housed in special Quick Reaction Alert hangars (abbreviated "QRA") at the end of runways. When North Bay contacted an air base for a scramble, simultaneously air traffic control on that base would halt and/or move aside all activity on the airfield. The fighter pilots would strap into and start their jets and the QRA's doors opened, then the jets would taxi out to the runway and take off.

In effect, the total time from Northern NORAD Region detecting an aircraft to jet fighters taking off was seven minutes. Anything longer without an excellent reason was deemed unacceptable, and could result in disciplining by NORAD authorities of everyone involved in the operation.

In July 1969, NORAD underwent a continent-wide revamping of its organization. The Northern NORAD Region was redesignated as the "22nd NORAD Region (22nd NR)", but its area of responsibility: north, Atlantic and east-central Canada and northern Maine—remained unaltered.

On 1 July 1983, the SAGE computer network at North Bay was officially switched off, and air defence operations taken over by the Underground Complex's Regional Operations Control Center/Sector Operations Control Center (ROCC/SOCC) computer system. The ROCC/SOCC system was incorporated throughout NORAD, as well as in North Bay, and caused another wholesale re-arranging of North America's air defences. In particular to Canada, the 22nd NORAD Region was replaced by the "Canadian NORAD Region (CANR)", Maine was transferred to an American NORAD centre, and the Underground Complex given responsibility for monitoring and protection of the airspace of the entire country. Canadian Forces Base North Bay had become the most important air base in Canada, with respect to the defence of the country and the continent.

The Canadian NORAD Region still exists. Its headquarters moved to Winnipeg, Manitoba, in April 1997, but air defence operations remained in North Bay.

In October 2006, Canadian NORAD Region air defence operations moved out of the Underground Complex into a new state-of-the-art installation built on the Earth's surface, named the Sgt David L. Pitcher Building after a Canadian serviceman who was killed in the crash of a United States Air Force AWACS patrol plane, in 1995.

== BOMARC ==
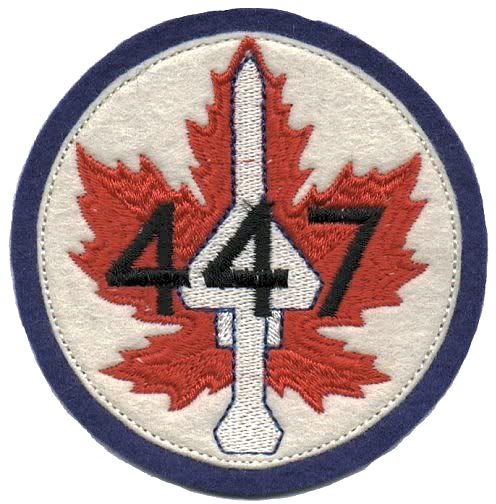
447 Squadron emblem (1960s)

North Bay's Underground Complex was also the command and control centre for two CIM-10 BOMARC surface-to-air missile squadrons in Canada. From 28 December 1961 – 31 March 1972, 446 Surface-to-Air Missile Squadron operated five miles (eight kilometres) north of the City of North Bay, at the site of a former RCAF radio station. The second squadron, 447 Surface-to-Missile Squadron, operated from a newly constructed site at La Macaza, Quebec. Each site was equipped with 29 BOMARC missiles: 28 for combat and a 29th for training purposes. The BOMARC was tipped with a 10-kiloton W-40 nuclear warhead (the bomb used at Hiroshima was 15 kilotons). In the event of a Soviet air attack on North America, some or all of the 56 missiles would have been launched into the air raids, and their nuclear warheads detonated, to destroy as many of the bombers as possible, while crippling surviving aircraft or "cooking" their bombs (rendering their nuclear devices inoperable) such that they could not complete their missions. The skies of central to eastern Canada would have been awash in Hiroshima-level detonations.

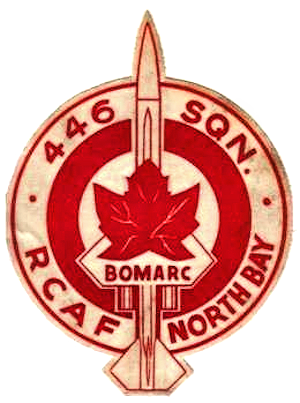
446 Squadron emblem (1960s)

The BOMARCs were deployed in the United States as well as Canada. While U.S. missiles were controlled strictly by American authorities, the Canadian BOMARCs were an international affair. The missiles were under Canadian government control, the warheads controlled by the United States. Permission was required from both governments for a launch. To activate a missile for launch, a Canadian and American officer at the BOMARC site, and a Canadian and American officer in the Underground Complex simultaneously turned keys. To launch, the Canadian and American officers in the UGC, at separate consoles, pressed a button at the same time. The missile would then be guided by a controller at a SAGE console in the UGC, until 10 miles (16 kilometres) from its target(s), then the BOMARC's homing system would take over and steer the missile until detonation. No BOMARCs were launched in Canada; squadron personnel from North Bay and La Macaza fired missiles (non-nuclear warhead) at the Santa Rosa Island Test Facility, Florida.

Due to the nuclear nature of the missiles all potential Bomarc personnel underwent Human Reliability Program tests to weed out those with "hidden idiosyncrasies, repressions, emotional disturbances, psychosomatic traits and even latent homosexuality". Their "family, friends, past history, schooling, religion and travel experiences were also gone into".

From 1961 to the end of 1963, the BOMARCs were not equipped with their warheads due to government indecision as to whether to equip the Canadian military with nuclear weapons. In late 1963, nuclear weapons were finally approved by the federal government, and the warheads distributed to the sites between 31 December 1963 and early 1964. They were to remain under American control; therefore, a section of each site was fenced off and declared American territory. Here the warheads were stored and serviced when not on installed in the BOMARCs. Canadians were not permitted to enter the area; when time came to load it onto a missile, a small, special gate was opened in the American section and the warhead pushed through into the Canadian side. In 1972, during the disbanding of the BOMARC squadrons and closing of the two sites, the warheads were removed from Canada.

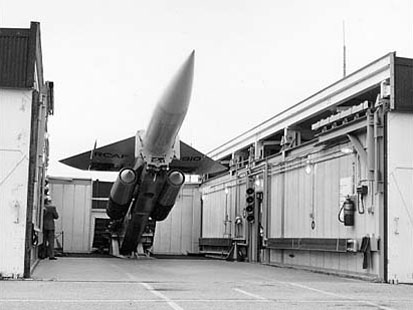
RCAF Bomarc on launch erector (1965)

The missile site was sold to Canadore College, which used it as a flight and aircraft maintenance training centre.

== Canadian Forces Base North Bay ==
Official badge of the air force base at North Bay, Ontario, after it changed from an RCAF Station to a Canadian Forces Base. Image courtesy and copyright 22 Wing/CFB North Bay, authorized by the Base Commander.

RCAF Station North Bay was renamed the Canadian Forces Base North Bay (abbreviated "CFB North Bay") on 1 April 1966 as part of the Canadian government's plan to merge the country's air force, army, and navy into a single entity: the Canadian Armed Forces. This plan, called "Unification," came into effect on 1 February 1968. The word "Armed" was eventually removed, and the country's military became the "Canadian Forces," a term that was used for many years until the reintroduction of the word "Armed" coinciding with the 2011 change of the air and sea elements being individually renamed as the "Royal Canadian Air Force" and "Royal Canadian Navy."

From December 1967 until August 1972, there were no flying units at CFB North Bay. The airfield portion of the base, at one time a thriving fighter station, fell largely into disuse. For example, one of its main hangars, employed to service and house heavily armed jet interceptors, was converted into an ice rink and saw year-round use by hockey leagues, figure skating clubs, and various other civilian entities in and around the City of North Bay.

=== 414 (Electronic Warfare) Squadron ===
414 Squadron returned to CFB North Bay in August 1972. Deployed as an electronic warfare unit, the squadron trained flying and ground air defence personnel to fight a war when an enemy has disrupted radar systems and radio communications. Specializing in the jamming, interference, and "stealing of radar and radio signals," the unit earned considerable renown, even notoriety, for its abilities. Its services were frequently requested by the navy and American armed forces.

Regarding the stealing of radar, the 414 Squadron personnel would electronically find and lock onto the radar set of a jet or a ground station, and take control of it. In stealing a radio communication frequency, 414 would pretend to be a fighter pilot or ground controller, and disrupt the air defence by doing things such as sending fighters in a wrong direction. A superb example of such stealing took place during a huge air exercise at Cold Lake, Alberta. A swarm of American and Canadian aircraft were divided into two teams. One team received command, control, and warnings of an enemy from a United States Air Force Airborne Warning and Control System (AWACS) jet, whose radar could monitor the entire battlefield. The crew of a 414 Squadron aircraft, the other team, was unable to break into the AWACS's air defence radio frequencies, but instead managed to contact the pilot and convince him that the AWACS had to return immediately to their home base at Tinker, Oklahoma. Off the AWACS flew, leaving their team to fend for themselves. In July 1992, 414 Squadron was split into two units and posted to the east and west coasts of Canada. It was the last military flying unit in North Bay. Thereafter, all of the base's airfield facilities were either demolished or sold, and CFB North Bay became the only air base in Canada not to have any military flying whatsoever. The federal government considered the possibility of shutting down the facility altogether.

=== 22 Wing ===
On 1 April 1993, all Canadian air bases were dubbed "wings" to restore an air force cachet to the installations, lost when the Canadian government lumped the army, navy and air force into a single military force in 1968. North Bay's base became "22 Wing/Canadian Forces Base North Bay", abbreviated as "22 Wing/CFB North Bay". It is often referred to simply as "22 Wing". The number "22" was chosen for North Bay to honour the old 22nd NORAD Region.

One of the units at the base was 22 Radar Control Wing, which evolved out of a unit called the "Radar Control Wing". The Radar Control Wing was created by the air force in 1987 to run day-to-day air defence operations in the Underground Complex for the Canadian NORAD Region. When an extraordinary event occurred or was about to occur, such as the approach to Canada of Soviet bombers, the Radar Control Wing alerted the Canadian NORAD Region, and the region's general and selected members of his staff would man a command post on the second floor of the Underground Complex. The Radar Control Wing and command post would then coordinate their efforts to handle the situation. For example, regarding Soviet bombers, while the Radar Control Wing saw to such activities as intercepting the aircraft and coordinating with civilian air traffic control in the area of the interception to avoid running into airliners, the command post would advise and consult with NORAD Headquarters in Colorado Springs, arrange an AWACS aircraft to assist, if deemed useful, and talk with the adjacent American NORAD region if it looked like the intercepted aircraft would enter their area, too.

When the Radar Control Wing was created, it was given command of the Sector Operations Control Centre East, which watched the eastern half of Canada from the Atlantic Ocean to the Manitoba border, and the Sector Operations Control Centre West, which oversaw Canadian skies from Manitoba to the Pacific Ocean.

In June 1989, the wing was renamed "22 Radar Control Wing". Simultaneously, the eastern control centre was renamed 21 Aerospace Control and Warning Squadron and the western centre became 51 Aerospace Control & Warning Squadron. Although it resided on CFB North Bay, and the base provided such things as pay, clothing and medical services, 22 Radar Control Wing was an entirely separate entity from the base with its own commander and staff of personnel.

In 1992, CFB North Bay and 22 Radar Control Wing were amalgamated under a single commander and command staff, but the base was still officially CFB North Bay. The wing and the base remained as separate organizations until united into 22 Wing/CFB North Bay in April 1993.

New (and current) badge of the air force base at North Bay, Ontario, authorized in 1995 after "22 Wing" was added to the name.

=== Near-death of the base, massive reductions and their effects on North Bay ===
As well as divesting the base of the airfield following 414 Squadron's departure in 1992, the Canadian government embarked on the wholesale demolition of CFB North Bay's non-airfield buildings and facilities, and dramatically slashed the numbers of civilian and military base personnel. Finally, the Canadian government announced it was closing the base, and the destruction of the base and reduction of its personnel accelerated.

The decision to close the base was monumental from a military standpoint since North Bay was the nerve center for the air defence of the country, and intricately tied into the United States in the air defence network of the continent. This entrenched system for national and continental air defence would have to be transferred collectively to another base, yet no other base in Canada had the means in place to receive the system.

From the non-military perspective, the decision had a seismic effect on the civilian community. CFB North Bay was the adjoining city's biggest industry. Between hiring employees from the community, contracting work on the base (such as roofing upgrades to its buildings), making purchases in local businesses, plus the money spent by its personnel and their family members, CFB North Bay infused tens of millions of dollars into the community annually. Already, due to the drop off of income from reductions to the base and its number of personnel, dozens of restaurants, shops and other businesses had folded. Exacerbating the situation the City of North Bay was being hit by another financial hammer—massive cutbacks to its fifth largest industry, the railways. Therefore, the base's closing was perceived by the community as catastrophic, and North Bay political, business and civic leaders launched a vocal, dogged, energetic campaign to persuade the Canadian government to reverse the decision. They succeeded. On 8 May 1998, Minister of National Defence the Honourable Art Eggleton visited North Bay and announced that the base would stay open indefinitely.

Despite the reprieve, the Minister stated that drastic cuts to the base were to continue. Manpower on the base, once numbering 2,200 military and civilian employees, was 530 when the announcement was made; the Minister remarked that another 100 personnel would be cut, and the base's infrastructure, at one time well over 100 buildings, was to be chopped to five, plus the air defence centre.

== Re-Shaping of 22 Wing/Canadian Forces Base North Bay & the 21st Century ==
22 Wing/CFB North Bay has continued as the centre for the air defence of the country, and partner with the United States in NORAD guarding the air sovereignty of the continent. In the late 1990s plans were enacted for a new air defence facility to replace the aging Underground Complex. The complex's air defence electronic, communications and computer systems—the leading edge of early 1980s technology—had become antiquated, struggling to cope with the demands and crises of an Internet Age world. Moreover, the cost of operating the decades-old, shopping centre-size subterranean complex was rapidly becoming prohibitive.

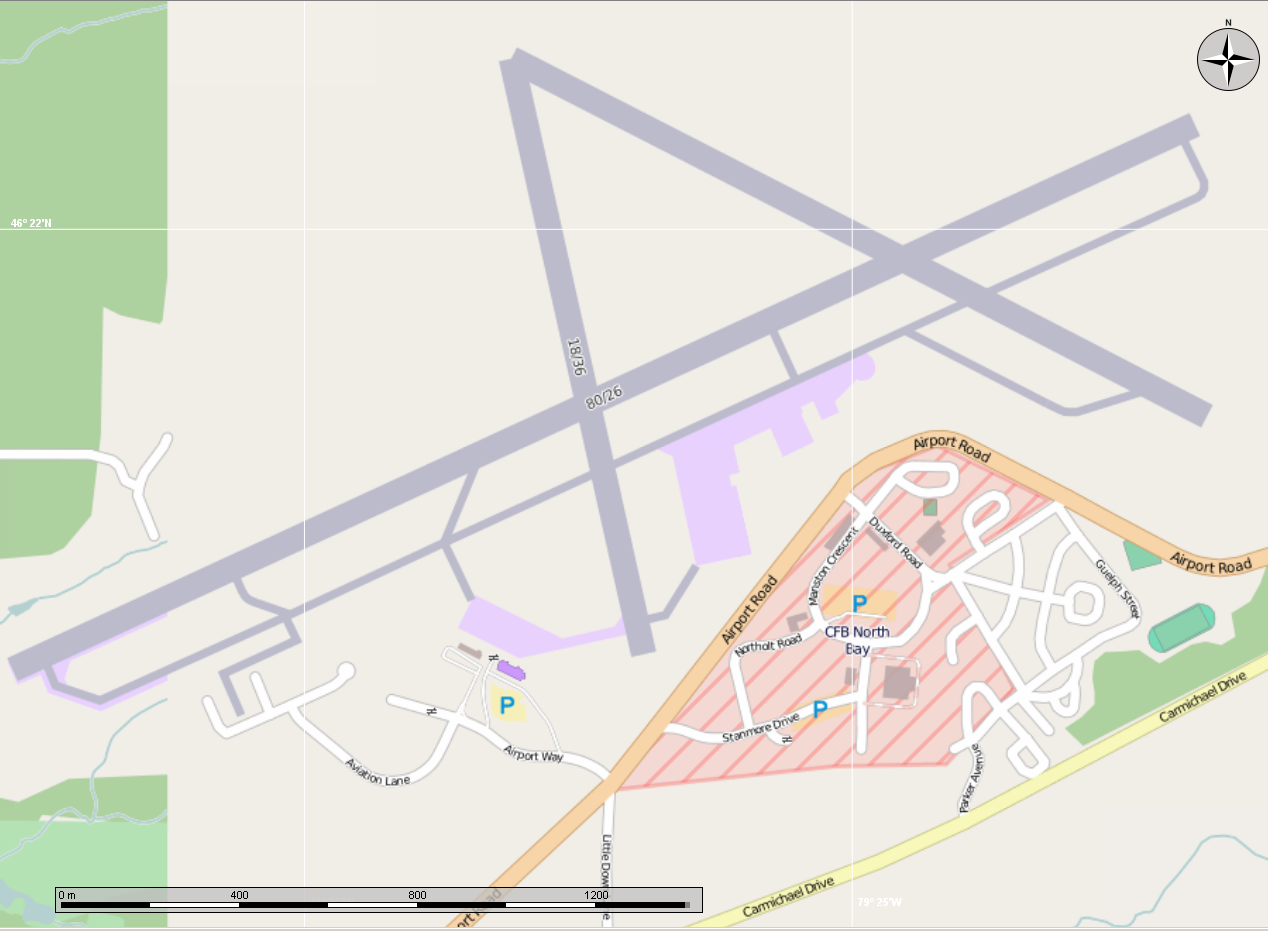
Map showing the extent of CFB North Bay in the 21st Century. To the north is North Bay Airport.

On 20 August 2003, Prime Minister the Right Honourable Jean Chrétien turned soil inaugurating the construction of a new above ground complex. Three years later, 12 October 2006, 43 years and 11 days after the Underground Complex's birth, a new surface installation was opened by Minister of National Defence, the Honorable Gordon O'Connor, officially taking the baton of air defence operations from the Underground Complex. The new installation was named the Sgt David L. Pitcher Building, in honour of a Canadian Forces Air Defence Technician who was killed in the crash of a Boeing E-3 Sentry Airborne Warning and Control System (AWACS) aircraft, call sign Yukla 27, at Elmendorf Air Force Base, Alaska, on 22 September 1995. The aircraft ingested birds into two of its four engines during takeoff; all 24 crew members were killed.

=== End of Air Defence Operations in the Underground Complex ===
On 26 October 2006, the Base Commander Colonel Rick Pitre led a parade of personnel in a ceremonial march-out of the Underground Complex, symbolically closing out all military operations in the Underground Complex for good. Since then the UGC has been maintained in "warm storage". All of its furniture, effects and equipment were removed except for the environmental controls, equipment and machinery in the Power Cavern. The Power Cavern (life support for the Underground Complex) has continued to provide heat, ventilation, air conditioning and other utility operations to prevent the complex from falling into decay. It is hoped that the complex will be leased or bought; it is one of the most secure, fire-safe facilities in the country, endowed with precision environmental controls that are ideal for certain uses such as an archives storage.

One option that arose: after three years of visits and discussions with DND and the base the Canadian motion picture company Alcina Pictures shot part of a science fiction movie in the Underground Complex. The low budget production, called The Colony, stars Laurence Fishburne, Bill Paxton and Kevin Zegers. In 2007, the base began entertaining the idea of using the UGC as a site for motion picture and television productions as a means to help offset its operating cost. Maintaining the UGC in warm storage required an outlay of $1,500 per day, with no foreseeable sale or lease of the site on the horizon, and many visitors had remarked about the Dr. Strangelove/mad scientist's lair look of the complex. The Ontario Media Development Corporation was subsequently contacted by the base, and representatives given a comprehensive tour. The Colony resulted, but, the requirements of security, logistics and other operations of the base for the movie proved staggering. The Underground Complex will not be used in this capacity again.

In 2005, the Main Installation and Power Cavern were designated as Federal Heritage Buildings, "Control Building 55" and "Power Cavern 53", on the Register of the Government of Canada Heritage Buildings.

=== NORAD Air Defence organization today ===
In 2000, the air defence aspect at 22 Wing/CFB North Bay was given the title "Canadian Air Defence Sector", abbreviated as "CADS". As a result, NORAD air defence in Canada in the 21st Century is organized as follows:

Canada and the United States are divided into three NORAD Regions: the Alaskan NORAD Region, the Continental U.S. NORAD Region and the Canadian NORAD Region. Headquarters of the Canadian NORAD Region is in Winnipeg, Manitoba. The Canadian NORAD Region operations center, which watches the skies and reacts to problems in the air, is the Canadian Air Defence Sector, at North Bay. The CADS was originally situated in the Underground Complex; as described above it moved above ground in October 2006, into the building named after Sergeant David L. Pitcher.

CADS is just one of many parts of 22 Wing/Canadian Forces Base North Bay. 21 Aerospace Control and Warning Squadron is the unit in CADS that carries out the air sovereignty of Canada. 51 Aerospace Control and Warning Operational Training Squadron is the operational training unit in CADS. It trains and tests military personnel in the various jobs and duties of air defence, as well as such non-air defence activities as first-aid and small arms handling.

=== North Bay Air Defence Operations in the 21st Century ===
The end of the Cold War on Christmas Day 1991 stirred many arguments in Canada and internationally that an era of global safety from major threats had arrived, and entities like NORAD were no longer needed. However, the al-Qaeda attacks of 11 September 2001 (colloquially known as the "9/11" attacks) against New York City and Washington, D.C. proved the necessity of continued surveillance and defence of North American skies, that attacks to the continent can come from anywhere, at any time, and in a least expected manner.

In another vivid example, on 11 September 2001, a Korean Air Flight 85 Boeing 747 en route to New York City from Seoul, Korea, headed to Anchorage, Alaska, for a refuelling stop, was ordered to land at Whitehorse, Yukon Territory. First, while making towards Anchorage, the crew had sent a text message to its airline including the letters "HJK", code for hijack, which prompted a scramble of two F-15s.

F-15s from Elmendorf Air Force Base by the Alaskan NORAD Region to intercept the jet, and Alaskan air traffic control to ask the Korean Air pilots via coded questions if they had been hijacked. During this exchange, the Korean pilots, supposedly on the instructions of ATC, set their transponder to 7500, which officially declared themselves hijacked. The Alaskan NORAD Region advised ATC they would shoot down the airliner if it flew near any significant ground targets, such as a city. ATC ordered the Korean crew to fly to Whitehorse instead, avoiding all populated centers in Alaska.

When the airliner and F-15s entered Canadian airspace they also entered the Canadian NORAD Region, thus came under the watch and control of the Canadian Air Defence Sector at 22 Wing/CFB North Bay. Canadian Prime Minister Jean Chrétien gave his permission to the Canadian NORAD Region Commander in Winnipeg: if the situation warranted North Bay could order the F-15s to shoot down Korean Air Flight 85. Fortunately the airliner landed without incident at Whitehorse. Royal Canadian Mounted Police boarded the aircraft; their investigation and interrogation of the pilots revealed no hijack, the incident apparently resulting from misunderstandings in the communications between the crew and Alaskan ATC.

22 Wing/CFB North Bay has been a participant in Operation Noble Eagle (abbreviated "ONE") since the operation was created by the United States on 14 September 2001, as a result of 9/11. ONE's purpose is to watch for and defend against similar air threats. For example, on 5 February 2006 the Canadian Air Defence Sector at 22 Wing/CFB North Bay provided air defence security over the Windsor, Ontario-Detroit, Michigan area, in support of Super Bowl XL, played in Detroit, and on 10 April 2012, a Korean Air Boeing 777 that had taken off from Vancouver International Airport was intercepted by F-15s under North Bay's control and diverted to 19 Wing/Canadian Forces Base Comox, British Columbia, after a bomb threat was reported against the airliner. The USAF F-15s had been scrambled from Portland, Oregon, in NORAD's Western Air Defense Sector (Continental U.S. NORAD Region), instead of RCAF CF-18s from Canada because the United States Air Force fighters were closer to the Korean airliner. Since NORAD is bi-national, Canadian and American interceptors routinely work with each other's NORAD air defence centers.

North Bay has also provided air defence security for many events unrelated to Operation Noble Eagle, such as the 2002 G8 Summit at Kananaskis, Alberta, the 2010 G8/G20 Summit at Huntsville and Toronto, Ontario and the 2010 Winter Olympics in Vancouver. For the latter, for the first time in its history, in order to meet any threats posed by slow speed aircraft, North Bay's NORAD controllers trained to carry out Ground Controlled Interceptions of helicopters.

In August 2007, a Russian submarine planted a one-meter titanium Russian flag on the sea bottom at the geographic North Pole, both as a propaganda venture and as a hint at the country's mindset towards the untapped multibillion-dollar oil and gas fields beneath the Arctic ice. That September, the Russians followed up by resuming Bear bomber flights along the northern fringe of North American airspace. Their aircraft have been intercepted both by the Alaskan NORAD Region and by Canadian CF-18 and American F-15 fighters controlled by the CADS at 22 Wing/CFB North Bay.

On 30 January 2014, North Bay officially added space surveillance to its operations. In 2010 its NORAD operations had taken the first steps to prepare for this new responsibility, forming a Space Surveillance Operations Centre (SSOC) that would act as part of the United States Space Surveillance Network. Sapphire, Canada's first military satellite, had been originally slated for a Russian rocket, but the washing machine-size craft was allocated to India in 2008–09. In 2010 two Indian rockets carrying commercial payloads went out of control and exploded, setting back scheduled launches—including Sapphire—years. After a continuous string of postponements the satellite was finally launched in February 2013. For the year of 2014, following its Final Operational Certification on 30 January, Sapphire delivered 1.2 million observations of space objects to the surveillance network.

In 2017, the Canadian Broadcast Museum Foundation announced that it was in negotiations to take over the underground bunker as a storage repository for the country's audiovisual broadcasting archives.

== Miscellaneous ==
=== 22 Wing Band ===
The 22 Wing Band was formed in 1990. It performs mainly in military functions but also public and charity events.

=== Air Cadets ===
While all regular-force flying units have moved away from the base, the civilian North Bay airfield is still home to a cadet gliding operation training air cadets as glider pilots.
