= Royal Canadian Air Force Academy =

Coordinates: 44°16′19″N 79°53′55″W

- École de l'Aviation royale canadienne
- Active: 1994–present
- Country: Canada
- Branch: Royal Canadian Air Force
- Type: Military education and training
- Part of: 16 Wing Borden
- Garrison/HQ: CFB Borden
- Motto: Discimus ducere (Latin for 'Learn to lead')

The Royal Canadian Air Force Academy (RCAF A, French: École de l'Aviation royale canadienne) is a Canadian Forces training establishment for non-commissioned members who serve with units of the Royal Canadian Air Force. Based at CFB Borden in central Ontario, it is a unit of the RCAF's 16 Wing. It also reports to the 2 Canadian Air Division, which is itself dedicated to the training of RCAF personnel. The RCAF A has five training flights in Borden as well as one flight in a detachment within Camp Aldershot, Nova Scotia.

The RCAF A consists of more than 1,800 students led by an administrative team consisting of approximately 50 regular force, reserve force, and civilian personnel. The school itself is as of 2024 headed by Lieutenant-Colonel Tan Nguyen and Chief Warrant Officer Fred Nolin.

In the early 1990s, Air Command became interested in establishing educational facilities to enhance its effectiveness in commissioning officers. As a result, three Junior Leadership schools based in Summerside, Prince Edward Island, and Penhold, Alberta, were closed and reassigned to the Air Command Professional Development and Training Centre (ACPDTC) in Borden, Ontario. The RCAF Academy began its operations in renovated post-Second World War barracks. In addition, the Air Force Indoctrination School Detachment in Saint-Jean-sur-Richelieu, Quebec, as well as the Canadian Forces School of Air Reserve Training in Penhold, also saw their cadets move to Borden. The ACPDTC was officially opened in 1994, and was renamed the Air Command Academy in October 2004.

The motto of the RCAF A is Discimus ducere (Latin for 'Learn to lead').

== Academy badge ==
In 1994, the ACPDTC adopted the badge of the former Junior Leader School (JLS) Penhold. It was retained by the unit when it was renamed to the RCAF Academy in 2004. The eagle on a blue field is significant of the Junior Leader School's affiliation with RCAF. The rising sun represents the new horizons and goals attainable by the student, which lead to a brighter future.
