= L'Annonciation, Quebec =

Community in Quebec

Coordinates: 46.409967°N 74.870320°W

L'Annonciation is an unincorporated community in Rivière-Rouge, Quebec, Canada. It is recognized as a designated place by Statistics Canada.

== Demographics ==
In the 2021 Census of Population conducted by Statistics Canada, L'Annonciation had a population of 1,735 living in 900 of its 973 total private dwellings, a change of 8.6% from its 2016 population of 1,598. With a land area of 10.12 km^{2} (3.91 sq mi), it had a population density of 171.4/km^{2} (444.0/sq mi) in 2021.

== Notable people ==
- Cécile Chabot (1907–1990), poet and illustrator

== See also ==
- List of communities in Quebec
- List of designated places in Quebec
