= Michael Pillarella =

Canadian actor

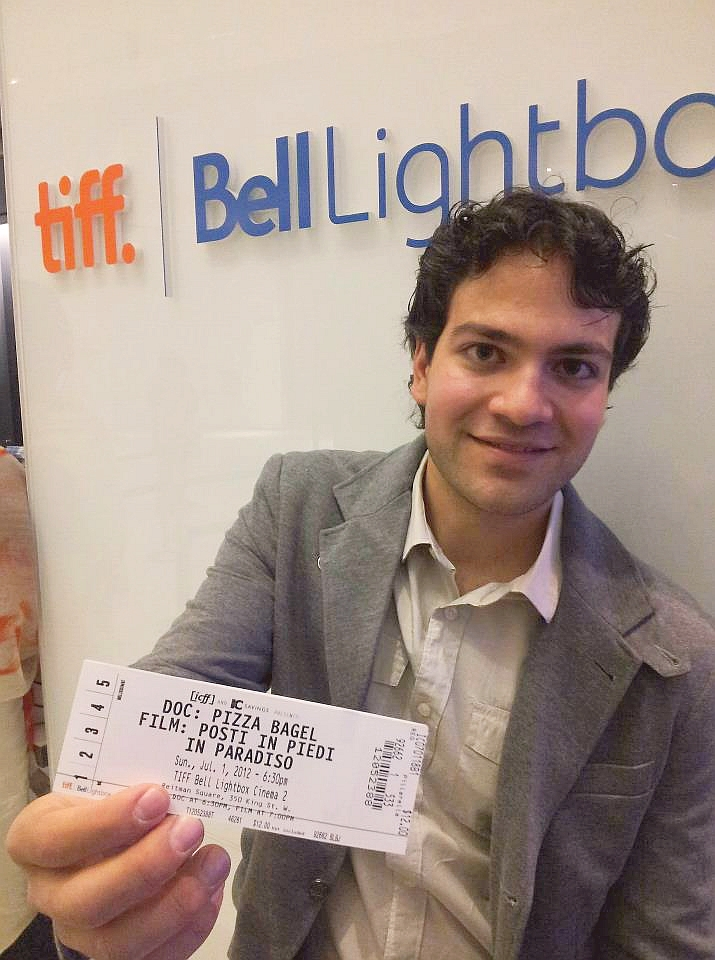
- Pillarella at a movie premiere
- Born: Michael-Angelo Pillarella; December 11, 1990 (age 35)
- Occupations: Actor, writer, producer and spoken word
- Years active: 2010-present

Michael Pillarella (born December 11, 1990) is a Canadian actor, writer, film producer and Spoken Word Artist. He is best known for his portrayal of Tommy in the 2012 film Pizza Bagel and his role as Detective Catalanotto in The Detectives Club: New Orleans.

== Career ==
Pillarella got his start in the 2010 Canadian feature film The Most Famous Celebrity of all Time. In late 2010 he landed the starring role in the Canadian independent film Stealin' Home, directed by Joe Mari, which went on to premiere at the 64th annual Cannes Film Festival as a short film contender. In early 2011, Pillarella landed a supporting role in the Ayz Waraich-directed feature film To Our Bright White Hearts, portraying the role of Tully.

In late 2011, Pillarella co-wrote, executive produced, and starred in the short film Pizza Bagel, which premiered at the 1st Annual ICFF Italian Contemporary Film Festival screening at the TIFF Bell Lightbox. Pizza Bagel went on to screen at over 30 international film festivals, including the San Francisco Jewish Film Festival, The New York City International Film Festival, and The UK Jewish Film Festival, garnering several accolades and awards. The success of Pizza Bagel both domestically and internationally bolstered the awareness of Pillarella's abilities as an actor and filmmaker.

Following the success of Pizza Bagel, Pillarella went on to portray Christopher Galliano in the third season of Fear Thy Neighbor and Detective Joey Catalanotto in The Detectives Club: New Orleans.

=== Filmography ===
Year	Title	Role	Notes
2010	The Most Famous Celebrity of all Time		
2011	Stealin' Home	Natty	
2012	Online Now	Graham Hicks	
2012	Threads	Michael Styles	
2012	To Our Bright White Hearts	Tully	
2012	Pizza Bagel	Tommy	also co-writer and executive producer
2013	Franny Lew	Gino	
2016	Fear Thy Neighbor	Christopher Galliano	
2017	The Detectives Club: New Orleans	Joey Catalanotto	
2017	12 Monkeys		

=== Spoken Word and Activism ===
In late 2017 Pillarella released, I Remember (Love, Heartbreak & Perseverance) to raise awareness for Mental Health. The video features Pillarella delivering a personal monologue that combines spoken word poetry with cinematic visuals. The video quickly went viral, achieving a large global viewership. Pillarella continues to advocate for mental health awareness, regularly releasing spoken word videos on his YouTube channel.
