= Cécile Chabot =

Canadian poet and illustrator (1907–1990)

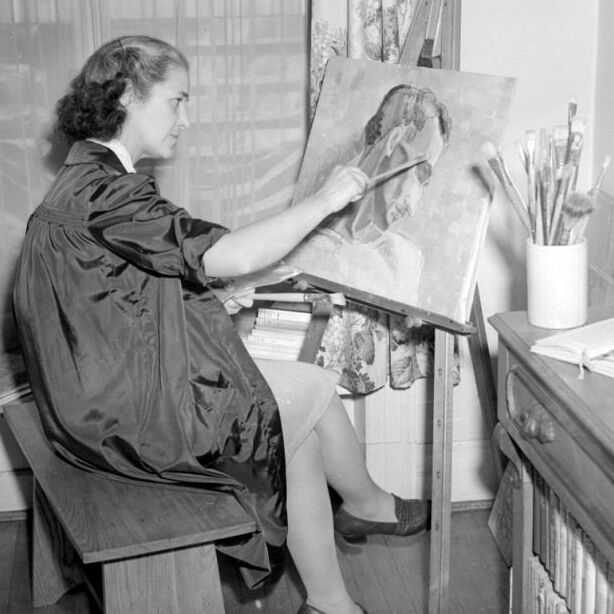
- Cécile Chabot in 1945
- Born: 11 September 1907; L'Annonciation, Quebec, Canada
- Died: 30 May 1990 (aged 82); Montreal, Quebec, Canada
- Education: École des beaux-arts de Montréal
- Occupations: Poet, artist
- Writing career
- Language: French

Cécile Chabot (11 September 1907 – 30 May 1990) was a Canadian poet and illustrator.

== Early life and education ==
Cécile Chabot was born on 11 September 1907 at 252, rue L' Annonciation Sud in L'Annonciation, Quebec to merchant Ferdinand Chabot and Alma Dubreuil. She was raised in Saint-Césaire, and attended Les Religieuses de la Presentation de Marie schools there. Chabot was then educated at École des arts et métiers and later at École des beaux-arts de Montréal. She also studied at the Université de Montréal. After finishing her education, she worked in the archives of the Musée de la province de Québec.

In 1948, she began studying at Sorbonne in Paris. While she was in Paris, she used the studio of Robert Bonfils.

== Career ==
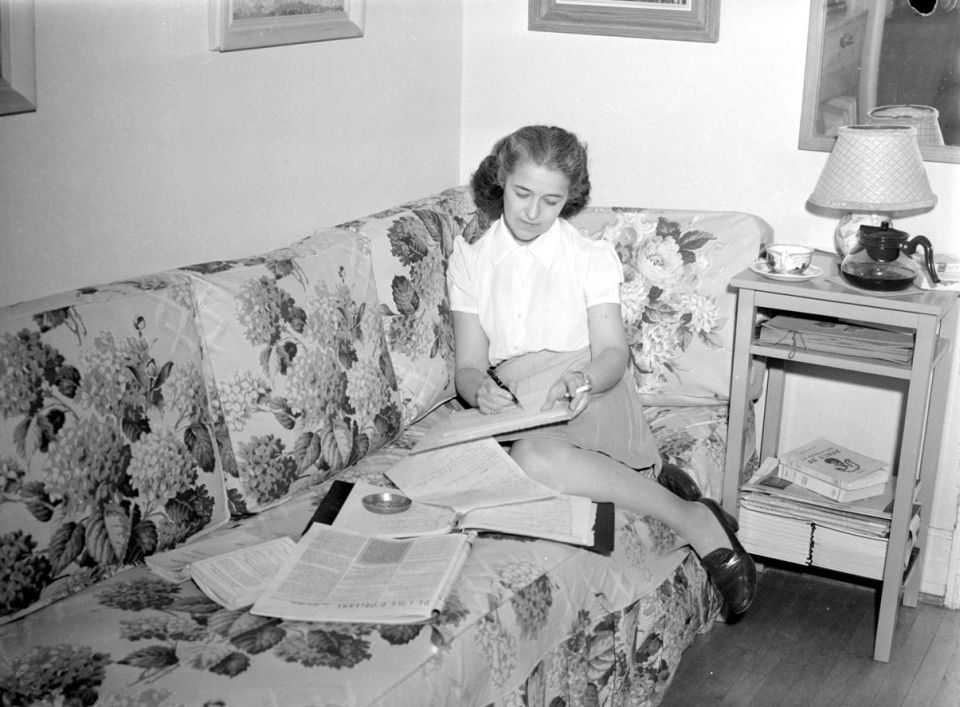
Chabot at her Esplanade Avenue residence in Montreal in 1945

Chabot served as the vice-president of the Société des poètes. She was awarded the gold medal by the society in 1929.

She came to prominence with the poem collection Vitrail in 1939, which she illustrated herself with etchings and watercolours. Three years later, in 1942, Chabot published Légende mystique.

Chabot created approximately forty sketches for Radio-canada over four years from 1942 to 1946. In addition to her work with Radio-canada, she served as a publicist for the Association des Amis de l'art from 1944. On 15 June 1948, Chabot officially became a member of the Canadian Writers Society and the Royal Society of Canada and received a medal from the latter in 1964 for her novel Feerie.

In 1961, Chabot published the short story Et le chevalvert, followed by Contes du ciel et de la terre the following year.

Many of her poems were inspired by her love of nature and religion, and she often illustrated her poetic collections herself. In addition to her poems, Chabot created numerous drawings, etchings and oil paintings. She also maintained a long correspondence with the author Gabrielle Roy after they met in Europe in 1948, with Roy writing over fifty letters to Chabot over twenty years.

== Death and legacy ==
Chabot died in Montreal on 30 May 1990, at the age of 82.

The house where she was born is commemorated in the Rivière-Rouge district of L'Annonciation. Additionally, a library in Sherbrooke is named after her.
