= 51 Aerospace Control and Warning Operational Training Squadron =

- Active: November 1954 – June 1958; 1989–present
- Country: Canada
- Branch: Royal Canadian Air Force
- Role: Operational training, Air Defence
- Part of: 22 Wing North Bay
- Home station: CFB North Bay
- Motto: Tenax propositi

Commanders
- Current commander: Major Matt Galvin

51 Aerospace Control and Warning Operational Training Squadron is a Royal Canadian Air Force unit based at 22 Wing/CFB North Bay. It is responsible for all operational and general training at 22 Wing. Operational and conversion training for RCAF personnel destined to work in the Canadian Sector Air Operations Centre (SAOC) is provided by the squadron.

== History ==
51 Aerospace Control and Warning (AC&W) Squadron was originally formed in Comox, BC, in November 1954 and disbanded in June 1958. The squadron was then re-formed at North Bay in 1989 as one of 22 Wing's three units.

In July 1994, the role of the squadron changed to an Operational Training (OT) squadron and it is now responsible for all operational and general training at 22 Wing.
