= Chris Gudzowsky =

Canadian/Australian Bobsledder

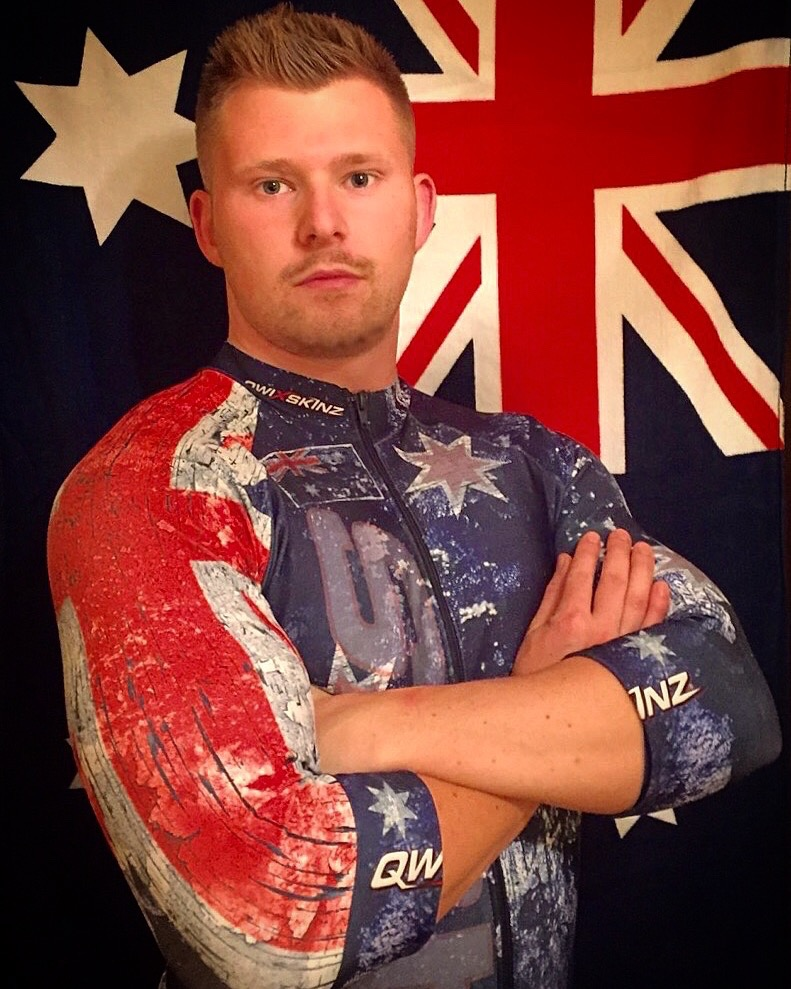
- Australian Team Photoshoot

Personal information
- Full name: Chris Gudzowsky
- Nationality: (Canada) Canadian / (Australia) Australian
- Born: 15 August 1990 (age 35) Calgary, Alberta, Canada
- Height: 1.81 m (5 ft 11 in)
- Weight: 98 kg (216 lb)

Sport
- Country: Canada / Australia
- Sport: Bobsleigh
- Team: Canada / Australia
Medal record
Men's Bobsleigh
Representing Canada
Representing Australia

Chris Gudzowsky (born 15 August 1990) is a Canadian born bobsledder who started competing in 2006. He was a Canadian Pilot in both two-man and four-man bobsleigh, before switching to Crew and Brakes for Australia. He became the youngest driver in the sport to compete in a World Cup event during his 2010 Whistler World Cup debut at the Whistler Sliding Centre.

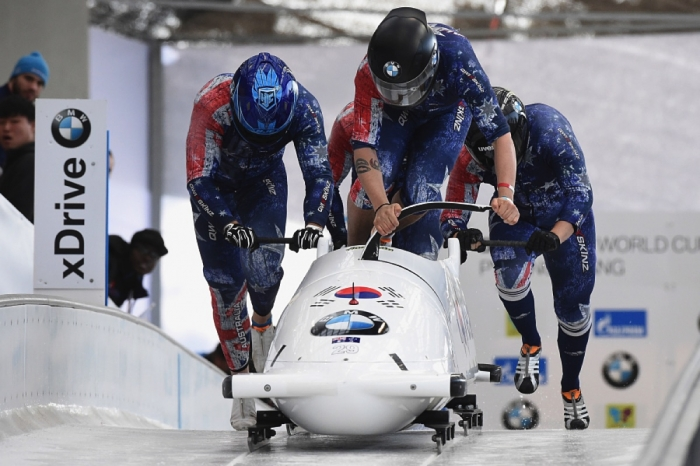
2017 PyeongChang Olympic Test Event 4man Race, Team Australia

== Biography ==
Gudzowsky was born in Calgary, Alberta, attending Elboya Elementary and Junior High School. He then proceeded to graduate with honors from Henry Wise Wood High School, before going on to work towards a Double Major in Marketing and International Business at Mount Royal University.

=== Sports career ===
Originally a Muay Thai fighter and Hockey player, in 2006 he switched to bobsleigh out of pure interest from his fathers past participation in the sport. At 16, he was the youngest bobsleigh athlete in the country. He then went on to compete on the Alberta Team for the next 3 years, until moving up to compete for Canada. He has competed in various international competitions over the years, as well as fore-running the Vancouver 2010 Winter Olympics in both two-man and four-man bobsleigh. In mid 2015 Gudzowsky moved to Australia. He took part and tested at the 2015 Australian National Team testing combine in Sydney Australia; making the Australian National Team in the process. He went on to compete for Australia's National Team in numerous international competitions. In 2017, he represented Australia's National Team at the PyeongChang Winter Olympic Test Event, In Korea, finishing 24th. Gudzowsky missed the opportunity of joining his team and representing Australia at the 2018 Olympic Winter Games in PyeongChang, due to citizenship processing issues. In 2020, Chris ended up receiving his Australian Citizenship; allowing him to represent Australia at future Olympic Games.

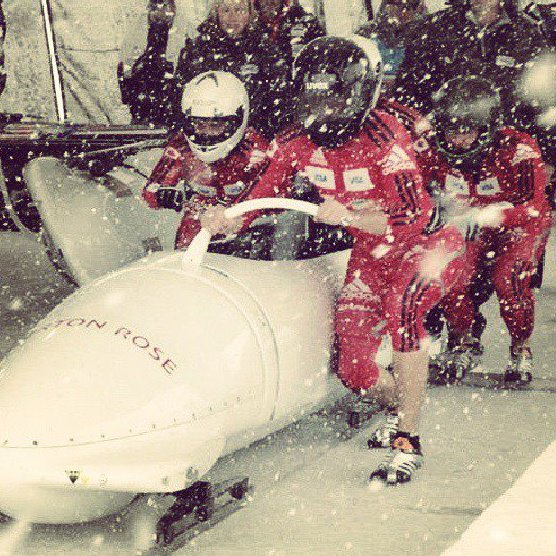
2012 NAC Race Park City

=== Personal life ===
Gudzowsky resides in Perth, WA, Australia. He continues to train full-time with hopes of competing in future Olympic Games and World Cup events.

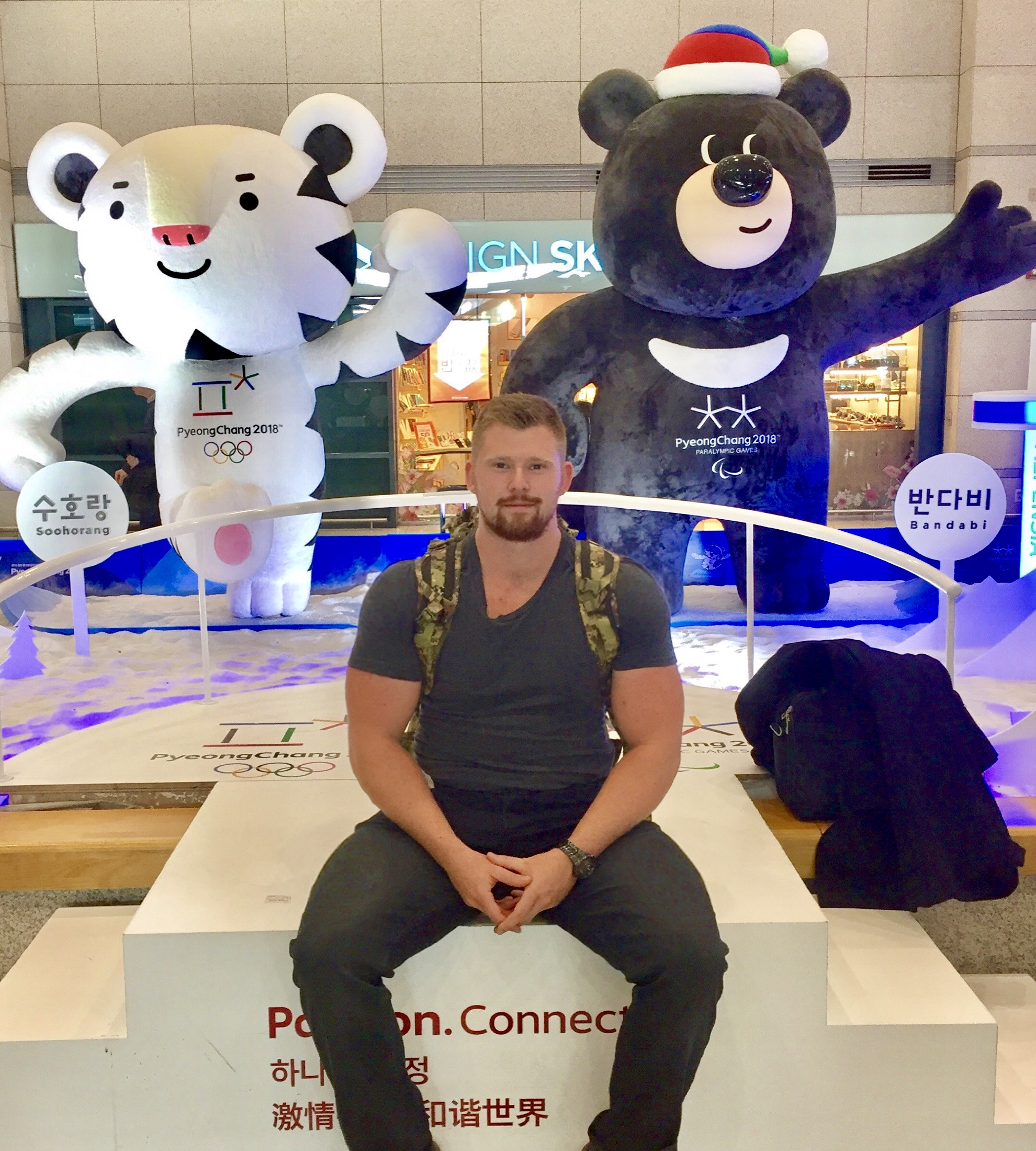
Seoul Korea International Airport: 2017 Prep for 2018 PyeongChang Olympics

== Australian results ==
Rank	Season	Date	Event
24 WC	2016–17	19 March 2017	4man Pyeongchang, Republic of Korea
5 NAC	2015–16	18 March 2016	4man Lake Placid, NY, USA
7 NAC	2015–16	17 March 2016	4man Lake Placid, NY, USA
7 NAC	2015–16	17 March 2016	4man Lake Placid, NY, USA
7 NAC	2015–16	29 February 2016	4man Park City, UT, USA
6 NAC	2015–16	28 February 2016	4man Park City, UT, USA
12 NAC	2015–16	14 November 2015	4man Calgary, AB, Canada

== Canadian results ==
=== World Cup ===
Rank	Season	Date	Event
11 WC	2010–11	27 November 2010	2man Whistler, BC, Canada
12 WC	2010–11	25 November 2010	4man Whistler, BC, Canada

=== North Americas Cup ===
Rank	Season	Date	Event
9	2012–13	9 December 2012	4man Calgary, AB, Canada
12	2012–13	8 December 2012	4man Calgary, AB, Canada
12	2012–13	8 December 2012	4man Calgary, AB, Canada
15	2012–13	8 December 2012	2man Calgary, AB, Canada
14	2012–13	6 December 2012	2man Calgary, AB, Canada
12	2012–13	6 December 2012	2man Calgary, AB, Canada
6	2012–13	17 November 2012	4man Calgary, AB, Canada
6	2012–13	17 November 2012	4man Calgary, AB, Canada
9	2012–13	16 November 2012	2man Calgary, AB, Canada
6	2012–13	10 November 2012	4man Park City, UT, USA
4	2012–13	9 November 2012	4man Park City, UT, USA
8	2012–13	8 November 2012	2man Park City, UT, USA
6	2012–13	7 November 2012	2man Park City, UT, USA
1st place, gold medalist(s)	2012–13	6 November 2012	Team Comp. Park City, UT, USA
13	2009–10	12 November 2010	2man Park City, UT, USA
16	2009–10	11 November 2010	2man Park City, UT, USA
14	2009–10	8 November 2010	Team Comp. Park City, UT, USA
11	2009–10	20 December 2009	4man Lake Placid, NY, USA
10	2009–10	20 December 2009	4man Lake Placid, NY, USA
17	2009–10	19 December 2009	2man Lake Placid, NY, USA
17	2009–10	19 December 2009	2man Lake Placid, NY, USA
15	2009–10	18 December 2009	2man Lake Placid, NY, USA
12	2009–10	12 December 2009	4man Calgary, AB, Canada
12	2009–10	12 December 2009	4man Calgary, AB, Canada
18	2009–10	11 December 2009	2man Calgary, AB, Canada
8	2009–10	5 December 2009	4man Park City, UT, USA
13	2009–10	5 December 2009	4man Park City, UT, USA
11	2009–10	4 December 2009	4man Park City, UT, USA
15	2009–10	3 December 2009	2man Park City, UT, USA
18	2009–10	2 December 2009	2man Park City, UT, USA
18	2009–10	1 December 2009	2man Park City, UT, USA
11	2008–09	21 November 2008	2man Lake Placid, NY, USA
11	2008–09	20 November 2008	2man Lake Placid, NY, USA
11	2008–09	9 November 2008	4man Calgary, AB, Canada
12	2008–09	8 November 2008	4man Calgary, AB, Canada
15	2008–09	7 November 2008	2man Calgary, AB, Canada
15	2008–09	6 November 2008	2man Calgary, AB, Canada
10	2008–09	2 November 2008	4man Park City, UT, USA
8	2008–09	1 November 2008	4man Park City, UT, USA
12	2008–09	31 October 2008	2man Park City, UT, USA
14	2008–09	30 October 2008	2man Park City, UT, USA
7	2007–08	4 April 2008	4man Lake Placid, NY, USA
11	2007–08	18 January 2008	2man Calgary, AB, Canada
13	2007–08	17 January 2008	2man Calgary, AB, Canada
