= 21 Aerospace Control and Warning Squadron =

21 Aerospace Control & Warning Squadron
- Active: 1953-present
- Country: Canada
- Branch: Royal Canadian Air Force
- Role: Air Defence
- Part of: 22 Wing North Bay
- Home station: CFB North Bay
- Motto(s): Intruder Beware

Commanders
- Current commander: Lieutenant-Colonel Stephen Buckley

21 Aerospace Control & Warning Squadron is a Royal Canadian Air Force unit based at 22 Wing/CFB North Bay. It is the operational air defence unit for the Canadian NORAD Region.

With its complement of 185 personnel, 21 Aerospace Control & Warning Squadron maintains air sovereignty over Canadian airspace, monitors Canada's surveillance assets and controls assigned military aircraft, such as CF-18 interceptors. It coordinates with outside agencies to identify air traffic (over 200,000 flights a year), provides control of special air sovereignty incidents, assist law enforcement agencies with cases of suspected smuggling of illegal drugs via air into North America and supports international defense and peacekeeping commitments.

== History ==
The Squadron was activated at the air defence radar station at St. Margarets, New Brunswick, Canada, in 1953 with the signing of the Pinetree Agreement.

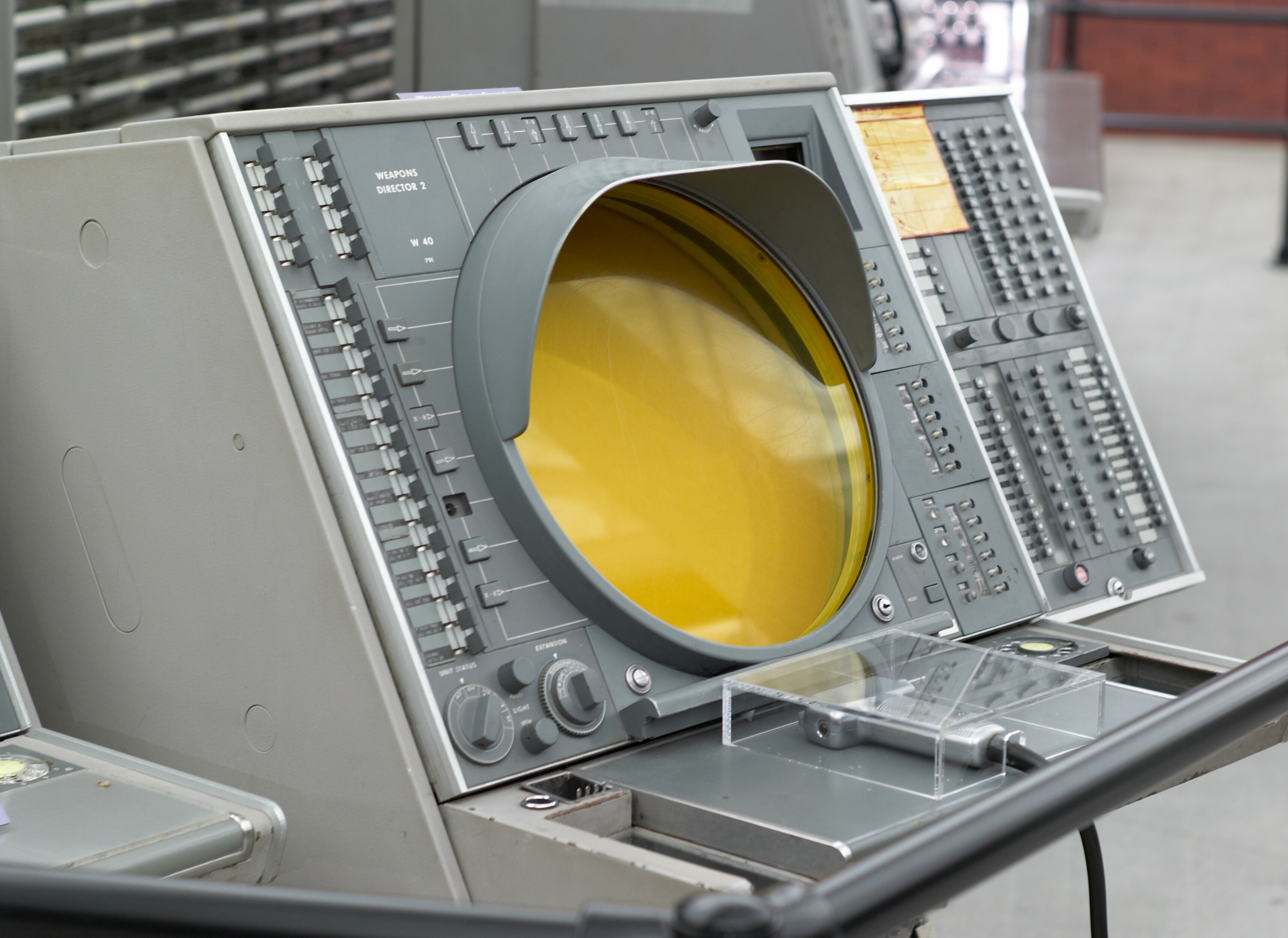
SAGE Console

In 1963 it became part of the Semi-Automatic Ground Environment system, the North American Air Defence Command's (NORAD's) computerized defence network, and became North Bay's alternate command post and automated back-up interceptor control unit, taking over in the event that North Bay—center for (then) the air defence of north, east-central and Atlantic Canada—was destroyed or otherwise put out of action.

In 1988 the unit was disbanded and reformed in CFB North Bay where it remains today.

== See also ==
- Radar Station, a 1953 short documentary about the Pinetree Line which includes footage on Aerospace Control and Warning Squadron operation
