= Air ambulances in Canada =

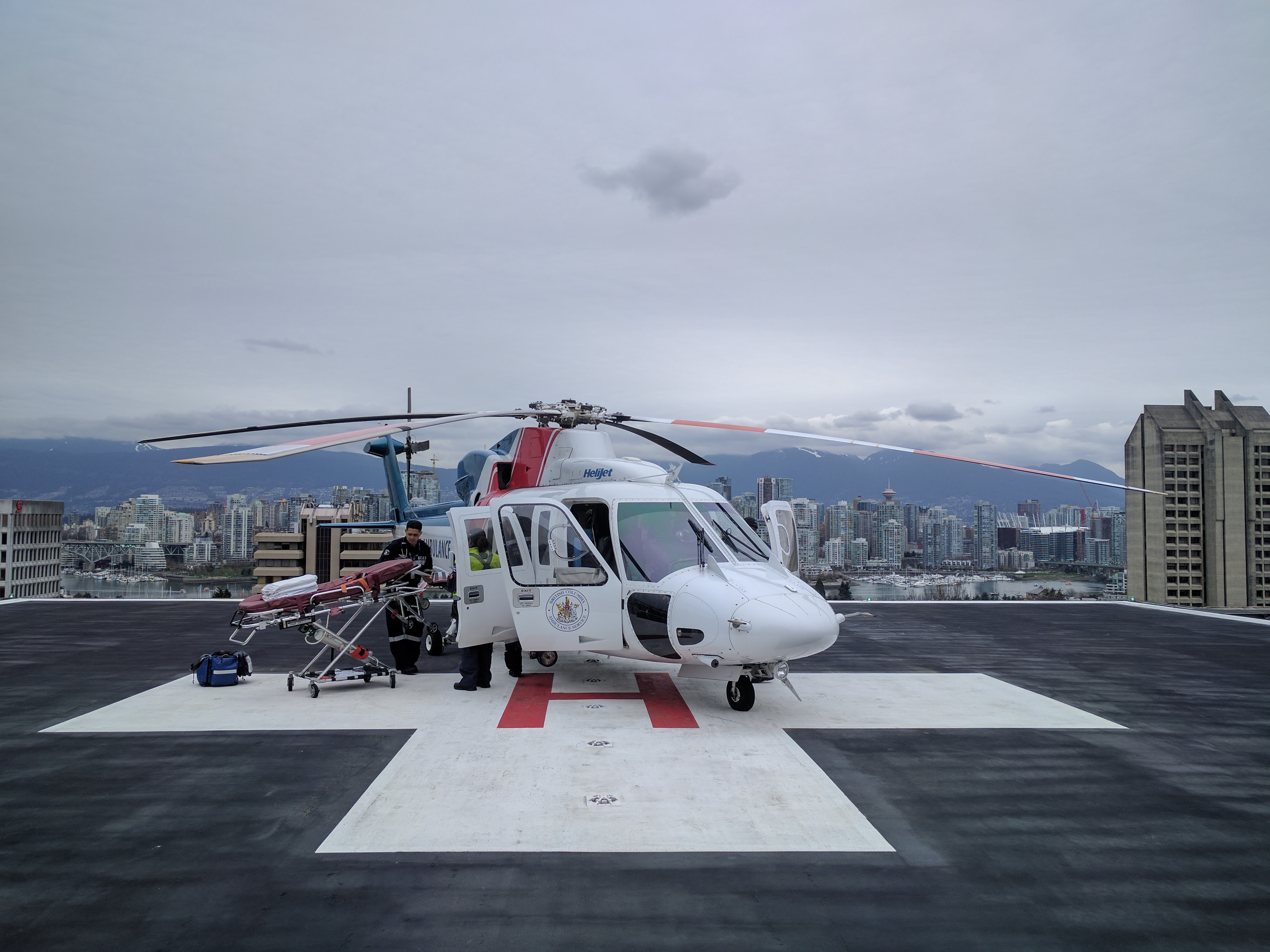
BCEHS critical care team on the helicopter pad on the top of Vancouver General Hospital following the offloading of a patient.

Air ambulance or medical evacuation (MEDEVAC) services in Canada are typically operated by third parties including non-governmental organizations and private contractors working on behalf of a provincial health authority, with a mix of fixed wing and rotary wing (Helicopter Emergency Medical Service or HEMS) fleets in use. They play a major role in Canadian healthcare given the massive geographic barriers to access. The two largest providers are Ornge Air Ambulance in Ontario, which operates twelve bases across the province, and STARS Air Ambulance, which operates six bases across Alberta, Saskatchewan, and Manitoba.

== List of air ambulances in Canada by province ==
=== Alberta ===
- Advanced Paramedic (APL)
- Alberta Health Services (Emergency Medical Services)
- Jet Companion Canada
- Alberta Central Air Ambulance
- CanWest Air
- HALO Air Ambulance
- HERO YMM
- Lifesupport
- Northern Air Charter
- Shock Trauma Air Rescue Service (STARS)
- Sunwest Aeromedical

=== British Columbia ===
- British Columbia Ambulance Service (Air ambulance program)
- Helijet- operated for British Columbia Ambulance Service
- Life Flight International - headquartered in Victoria, British Columbia and proving services worldwide
- Lifesupport
- Northern Thunderbird Air
- Regent Air - B.C. based air ambulance company offering services throughout North America
- Shock Trauma Air Rescue Service (STARS) - eastern BC only
- Summit Helicopters - operated in partnership with British Columbia Ambulance Service to service the interior of British Columbia now operates in partnership with Évacuations aéromédicales du Québec (EVAQ)
- Technical Evacuation Advanced Aero Medical Society (TEAAM)

=== Manitoba ===
- Aeromed (Perimeter Aviation)
- Custom Helicopters
- Keewatin Air (Kivalliq Air / Nunavut Lifeline)
- Missinippi Airways (Missinippi Air-Care)
- Shock Trauma Air Rescue Service (STARS)
- SkyCare
- SkyNorth Air
- Vanguard Air Care - a division of Fast Air

=== New Brunswick ===
- Ambulance New Brunswick

=== Newfoundland and Labrador ===
- Cougar Helicopters
- EVAS Air
- PAL Aerospace

=== Northwest Territories ===
- Aklak Air
- Advanced Medical Solutions - Medic North in partnership with Air Tindi

=== Nova Scotia ===
- LifeFlight - aircraft operated by Canadian Helicopters and PAL Aerospace

=== Nunavut ===
- Keewatin Air (Kivalliq Air / Nunavut Lifeline)
- Summit Air Kivalliq

=== Ontario ===
- Angels of Flight Canada
- Helicopter Transport Services
- International Assistance Group
  - Fox Flight Air Ambulance
  - Jet Companion Canada
- Latitude Air Ambulance
- Lifesupport
- Ornge
  - SkyCare
- Thunder Airlines
- Voyageur Airways

=== Prince Edward Island ===
- LifeFlight
- Trinity Air Ambulance - headquarters in Florida, United States, operates throughout Canada

=== Quebec ===
- Air Creebec
- Air Inuit
- Airmedic
- Helico Secours coopérative de solidarité
- Lifesupport
- Propair

=== Saskatchewan ===
- Rise Air
- Saskatchewan Air Ambulance
- Shock Trauma Air Rescue Service (STARS)

=== Yukon ===
- Alkan Air
