= NSPS =

NSPS is an acronym with multiple meanings:

- New Source Performance Standard, a U.S. Environmental Protection Agency term
- National Security Personnel System, a human resources program of the U.S. Department of Defense
- Nova Scotia Paramedic Society, promotes emergency health services in Nova Scotia, Canada
- National Shipbuilding Procurement Strategy, a plan to rebuild and modernize the Royal Canadian Navy
- National Society of Professional Surveyors, a professional organization for surveyors
