= Emergency Health Services =

Paramedic services in Nova Scotia, Canada

Emergency Health Services (EHS)
- Established: 1994
- Headquarters: Halifax, Nova Scotia
- Jurisdiction: Provincial
- Employees: 1500
- Ambulances: 151 Ground Ambulances, 46 Patient Transport Units/Low Acute Transport units (PTU/LAT), 13 Medical Transport Service Van, 37 Single Responder/Supervisor/ECP/CP units, Two Rotary-Wing aircraft (S76-C+), Two Fixed-Wing Aircraft - Critical Care (King Air 200), Air Medical Transport (Beech 1900D)
- Responses: > 198,000/year
- Website: www.gov.ns.ca/ehs/

Emergency Health Services (EHS) is a branch of the Nova Scotia Department of Health tasked with providing emergency medical services. It is also responsible for transportation of patients between hospitals and medical facilities. At present, all ground ambulance and air ambulance service in Nova Scotia is contracted by EHS to Emergency Medical Care (EMC), a subsidiary of Medavie Health Services.

The contract is delivered by EMC through 150 ground ambulances and their support facilities, one helicopter, one fixed-wing aircraft, and approximately 900 paramedics.

EHS leases all ground ambulances and support facilities which are operated under contract by EMC. Many of the EHS Paramedic Stations are single-unit structures in the smaller rural communities, while having larger paramedic stations in larger centres that have the capacity to house a diverse fleet of vehicles. Every hospital in the province and many community health centres have helipads for LifeFlight air ambulance service.

EMC, EHS and the Medical Communications Centre (MCC) are located in Burnside Business Park in Dartmouth for coordinating emergency medical services across the province.

== History ==
Prior to 1995, Nova Scotia relied on approximately 50 funeral home, private and public ambulance companies, the owners of which were represented by the Ambulance Operators Association of Nova Scotia (AOANS). The level of medical care, staff qualifications, type and condition of ambulances and supplies, and working conditions varied throughout the province. Most medical air transportation was provided by the Canadian Forces' 413 Transport and Rescue Squadron operating out of CFB Summerside (1968-1990) and CFB Greenwood (1990-present). 413 Squadron used search and rescue aircraft such as the CH-113 Labrador helicopter as well as the CC-115 Buffalo and later the CC-130 Hercules fixed-wing aircraft to deliver aid to the civil power missions.

In 1993, Cape Breton Island native Dr. Ron Stewart, who was instrumental in organizing emergency medical services in southern California earlier in his career during the 1970s, was elected to the Nova Scotia House of Assembly and was appointed Minister of Health. Dr. Stewart quickly commissioned several reports on health care reform, one of which was conducted by Dr Mike Murphy, the director of emergency services at the Isaac Walton Killam Children's Hospital and the Victoria General Hospital Emergency Department which offered a comprehensive evaluation on the state of the province's ambulance services. Dr Murphy's report was highly critical of the ambulance system at that time.

The recommendations of the Murphy Report were subsequently adopted and by 1994 the transformation of Nova Scotia's ambulance system began. The Nova Scotia Department of Health created Emergency Health Services to take over control of ground ambulance operations.

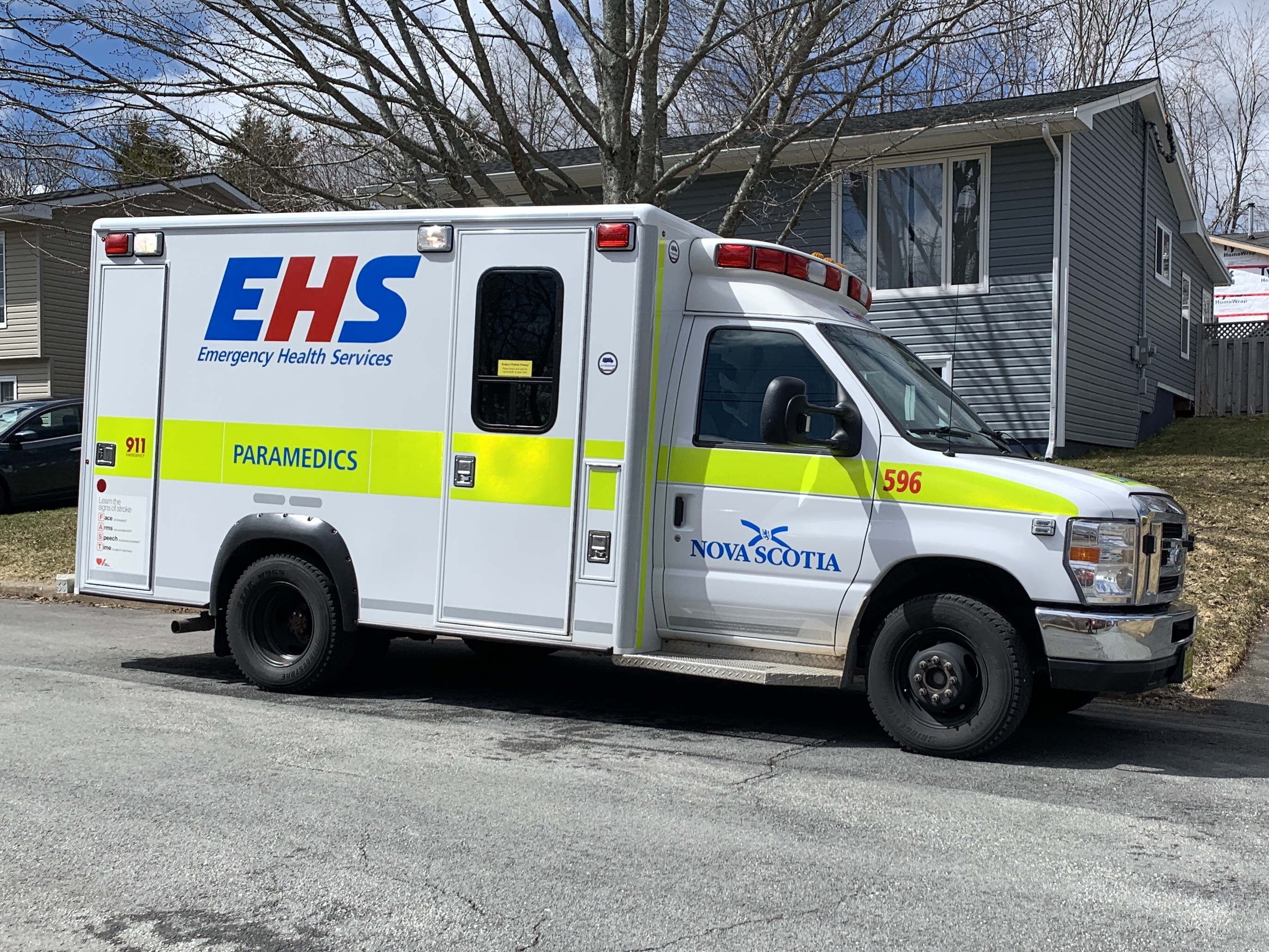
Nova Scotia ambulance in April 2020 in Halifax

From 1994 until 1999, the previous contract for ground ambulance service in Nova Scotia with the Ambulance Operators Association of Nova Scotia (AOANS) was gradually taken over by Emergency Health Services, consolidating all the private ambulance companies in Nova Scotia into a single entity. A new contract was then awarded, under a long-term performance based contract, to Emergency Medical Care Inc. (EMC). EMC is a subsidiary of Medavie Health Services, which is part of Medavie, a health services company that includes Medavie Blue Cross.

April 2004 marked the last EHS takeover of a local ambulance service, when West Pubnico Ambulance and Funeral Services ceased operation. EHS opened a new base in the community and hired additional paramedics.

In October 2004, new emergency health legislation was introduced. The Emergency Health Services (EHS) Act outlines the requirement for ambulance service providers to meet standards of patient care, performance and competency.

In January 2008, Nova Scotia became the first province in Canada to offer all of its residents the benefits of electronic patient records throughout the ambulance system.

== List of directors ==
Directors of EHS	Years of service
Diane Golden	1994 - 1998
Marilyn Pike	1998 - 2008
Ian Bower	2008 - 2012
Chris Nickerson	Jan 2016 - Nov. 2016
Larry Crewson	2017–2022
Jeffrey Fraser	2022–Present

== EHS Paramedic Regulatory ==
From 1994 til April 1, 2017 Emergency Health Services Nova Scotia was the regulatory body for paramedics. In 2005 Department of Health and Wellness started working with paramedics forum the College of Paramedics Advisory Committee (COPAC). The COPAC working with government and paramedic stakeholders from the College of Paramedics of Nova Scotia, which will allow self-regulation in EMS.

== EHS Core Programs ==
=== Communications & Dispatch Services ===
EMC operates a central communications dispatch centre in Burnside Business Park in Dartmouth, Nova Scotia for coordinating emergency medical services across the province.

=== Ground Ambulance services and Disaster ===
EHS leases 150 ambulances through Tri-Star Industries of Yarmouth, Nova Scotia. This fleet is procured by the Government of Nova Scotia and managed and operated under contract by Emergency Medical Care Inc. (EMC). There are 65 strategically located ambulance bases throughout the province, some of which are owned by EHS, others are rented by EMC (e.g. volunteer fire departments).

== EHS Provincial Programs ==
=== LifeFlight ===
EHS initiated air ambulance service for Nova Scotia in 1994 in partnership with CHC Helicopter Corporation (CHC) and the Shock Trauma Air Rescue Society (STARS). STARS operated the service until 2001 when it opted not to renew its agreement with EHS, citing philosophical differences over management and fundraising. EHS operated air ambulance service directly under the new name "LifeFlight" and awarded a long-term operating contract for this service to Emergency Medical Care Inc. (EMC) in 2008.

=== Atlantic Health Training and Simulation Centre ===
The Atlantic Health Training and Simulation Centre is a training facility for emergency medical services personnel such as paramedics. It is located at the Queen Elizabeth II Health Sciences Centre.

=== Medical first response program ===
The medical first response program is a program that responds personnel to a life-threatening emergency situation if they are closer than the paramedics to rapidly stabilize the scene and/or patient(s), to provide relevant medical information to paramedics before they arrive, and to support paramedic care on scene after paramedics arrive. They are not used on every EHS call, only life-threatening calls or on an individual basis as requested by paramedics. Although dominated by the volunteer fire service; first responders can also include police/RCMP, life guards, security guards, etc. Trained personnel are certified as Medical First Responders (MFR)'s. They are able to provide advanced first aid, including oxygen administration, and early defibrillation as required.

=== Nova Scotia trauma program ===
The trauma program is to facilitate optimal trauma care by providing education, research leadership in injury prevention and control and trauma system development.

== EHS Innovative Paramedic Programs ==
=== Community Paramedicine ===
A model of care in Long & Brier Islands where paramedics apply their training and skills in community based environments. Established in 2001, due to a shortage of physician care in the community. Paramedics work in a collaborative environment with a nurse practitioner, delivering quality primary health care services to a remote Nova Scotia community. The Long and Brier model has successfully achieved greater access to primary health care services for the residents of these two islands. Interviews with residents have highlighted personal success stories and satisfaction with the health services provided by the paramedics and NPs. They also noted that their health status has improved, and they expressed satisfaction with the shorter wait times and travel times to obtain access to care. Currently the data collection has shown a 23% decrease in emergency department visits by islanders and an increase in the project’s patient contacts by 250 to 300 during the 2002/2003 fiscal year. Average visits by islanders to Digby facilities decreased by 24% to 28% from 2001 to 2006.

=== Extended Care Paramedic Program ===
Founded on February 2, 2011, the program involved a team of Advanced Care Paramedics (ASP) who were assigned to a unique ECPs role in the nursing home. These ECP's received specialized training tailored to the needs of nursing home patients. This included geriatric assessment and management and other advanced skills such as suturing. The benefit to CDHA is fewer patients are being transported to their facilities - that means less emergency department congestion, reduced consumption and alignment with their focus on patient-centred care. Additionally, it fees up paramedics on the ambulances to more efficiently and effectively provide emergency patient care for those who need it. After 41 weeks ECPs attended to 599 nursing home calls and 73% patients were treated on site without the need for ambulance transport.

=== Collaborative Emergency Centres ===
Beginning in July 2011, to address hospital closures and reduce hospital wait time in the emergency departments with the goal of improving emergency department care to Nova Scotians. At these centres Paramedic and Nurses work together with an online EHS medical oversight physician to provide care to patients. The first CEC was opened in Parrsboro and on MArch 24, 2012 a second CEC was opened at All Saints Hospital in Springhill.

== EHS Core Projects ==
=== RESTORE ===
Heart attack patients who are experiencing chest pain and call 911 will receive faster treatment through new training by Advance Care Paramedics. As part of government's Better Care Sooner health plan, the provincial prehospital STEMI Reperfusion Strategy (RESTORE) expanded province wide. This use of prehospital thrombolytics has the potential to significantly reduce the damage to heart muscle caused in a heart attack.

=== MedicAlert Interchange Project ===
MedicAlert Access—En Route in Nova Scotia allows paramedics to access the MedicAlert emergency health record from ambulances and include it as part of the electronic patient care record. The Siren ePCR software, developed by Medusa Medical Technologies, is used by paramedics to chart the care they provide to patients in the field. Paramedics can now call up a patient's MedicAlert record, to obtain critical data such as allergy, medication, and physician information.

=== Provincial Public Access Defibrillation (PAD) Registry ===
In partnered with the Heart and Stroke Foundation of Canada in the "Restart a Heart, Restart a Life" campaign which focused on automated external defibrillator (AED) and cardiopulmonary resuscitation (CPR) training throughout Nova Scotia.

== EHS facts ==
- All EHS paramedics are employed by Emergency Medical Care Inc. (EMC) and are members of the International Union of Operating Engineers, Local 727
- All dispatchers are employed by Emergency Medical Care Inc. (EMC) and are members of the Canadian Union of Postal Workers
- There is no fee for being transported by air ambulance for residents of Nova Scotia.
- The ground ambulance fee can range from $120 to $600 depending on the call. If a person has no insurance to cover the fee a monthly payment as low as $5.00 without interest can be paid.
