= Z Paige L'Erario =

Neurologist

- Education: Cornell University; Perelman School of Medicine; Columbia Business School; Fordham University
- Awards: 2021 Emerging Leaders Program of the American Academy of Neurology; 2023 Phi Kappa Phi Honor Society
- Scientific career
- Fields: neurology; stroke; transgender medicine; functional neurological disorder

Z Paige L'Erario (previously known as Mackenzie Paige Lerario) is an American neurologist and writer who researches neurological and mental health outcomes in the transgender and gender diverse community. Their writing on neurology, mental health, and LGBTQ+ healthcare has appeared in Scientific American, Neurology Blogs, Psychiatric Times, and Social Work Today.

== Career ==
L’Erario's early career involved clinical research in stroke epidemiology and prehospital stroke care. They served as the Director of the NewYork-Presbyterian Mobile Stroke Unit Program. L’Erario published various peer-reviewed articles on stroke care and was published in the New England Journal of Medicine for their work on BEnefits of Stroke Treatment Delivered Using a Mobile Stroke Unit (BEST-MSU).

L’Erario publicly identified as transgender in 2019. Their later career has involved social activism work in Westchester, NY under the name Greenburgh Pride, which they co-founded in 2021 while a graduate student at Fordham University. In 2021, L’Erario co-founded the Gender Equity Working Group of the American Academy of Neurology’s LGBTQI Section. As of 2023, they are the Section's elected Vice-Chair. They also serve on the editorial board of the scientific journal Neurology: Clinical Practice. As of 2025, Dr. L'Erario is an Associate Professor of Medicine at Thomas Jefferson University in Philadelphia, and is affiliated with Thomas Jefferson University Hospital and Jefferson Methodist Hospital.

== Gender Identity Discrimination Lawsuit ==
Since 2020, L’Erario has been involved in litigation within the Southern District of New York alleging job bias and retaliation. A motion to dismiss by NewYork-Presbyterian Queens and Weill Cornell Medicine was denied by Judge John G Koeltl in 2022. The court denied L'Erario's request for a preliminary injunction and reinstatement while the case proceeded. The lawsuit was resolved in December 2023.

== Honors and awards ==
- Selected for the American Academy of Neurology Emerging Leaders Program in 2021

== Selected works ==
- L'Erario, Z Paige; Patel, Roshni; Marmo, Suzanne; and Vincent, David.The Warrior Identity: LGBTQ+ Military Service Members. Social Work Today Vol. 23 No. 2 P. 12. https://www.socialworktoday.com/archive/Spring23p12.shtml
- L'Erario, Z Paige. "New Research Points to Causes for Brain Disorders with No Obvious Injury." Scientific American. 31 March 2023 https://www.scientificamerican.com/article/new-research-points-to-causes-for-brain-disorders-with-no-obvious-injury/
- L'Erario, Z Paige."Voice Training Is a Medical Necessity for Many Transgender People." Scientific American. 19 September 2022. https://www.scientificamerican.com/article/voice-training-is-a-medical-necessity-for-many-transgender-people/
- Houle N, Goudelias D, Lerario MP, Levi SV. Effect of Anchor Term on Auditory-Perceptual Ratings of Feminine and Masculine Speakers. Journal of Speech, Language, and Hearing Research. 2022 Jun 8;65(6):2064-2080. doi: 10.1044/2022_JSLHR-21-00476. https://pubs.asha.org/doi/10.1044/2022_JSLHR-21-00476
- Grotta JC, Yamal JM, Parker SA, Rajan SS, Gonzales NR, Jones WJ, Alexandrov AW, Navi BB, Nour M, Spokoyny I, Mackey J, Persse D, Jacob AP, Wang M, Singh N, Alexandrov AV, Fink ME, Saver JL, English J, Barazangi N, Bratina PL, Gonzalez M, Schimpf BD, Ackerson K, Sherman C, Lerario M, Mir S, Im J, Willey JZ, Chiu D, Eisshofer M, Miller J, Ornelas D, Rhudy JP, Brown KM, Villareal BM, Gausche-Hill M, Bosson N, Gilbert G, Collins SQ, Silnes K, Volpi J, Misra V, McCarthy J, Flanagan T, Rao CPV, Kass JS, Griffin L, Rangel-Gutierrez N, Lechuga E, Stephenson J, Phan K, Sanders Y, Noser EA, Bowry R. Prospective, Multicenter, Controlled Trial of Mobile Stroke Units. New England Journal of Medicine. 2021 Sep 9;385(11):971-981. https://www.nejm.org/doi/full/10.1056/NEJMoa2103879
- Lerario, Z Paige, "Voice Training for Transgender People: Speech therapy and language strategies can help save lives", Scientific American, vol. 328, no. 1 (January 2023), p. 55. "Voice training is less costly and invasive than a throat operation... Through sessions with a licensed speech-language pathologist, transgender people learn to control pitch, resonance, word choice and other vocal behaviors.... Such training can improve quality of life, reduce voice-related disability and boost self-confidence."
