= Nova Scotia Paramedic Society =

- Founded: 2011
- Headquarters: 237 Brownlow Ave, Suite 160, Dartmouth, Nova Scotia, Canada
- Location: Canada
- Key people: President: John Bignell, Chair: Frank Johnston
- Website: www.paramedicsociety.com

The Nova Scotia Paramedic Society (NSPS) is a professional association established in 2011 that promotes the study, research, and communication of the history of Emergency Health Services (EHS) within the province of Nova Scotia, Canada.

== History ==
When in 2010, in the "John Rossiter Room" at the New Halifax Infirmary, paramedics John Bignell and Frank Johnston overheard a conversation between two paramedics talking about " who was John Rossiter?", it had become evident that in less than a decade, history had been lost and the memory of past medics were not being passed down to future generations of Nova Scotian paramedics. Tony Eden, director of EHS Ground Ambulance Services, had started collecting articles and memorabilia related to the history of Nova Scotia's EHS.

In 2013 the NSPS started working with the Nova Scotia government to create Medic Monday. Legislature unanimously adopted a motion from PC caucus whip MLA Allan MacMaster. In the Spring of 2011, a small group of physicians and paramedics met with Tony Eden, to talk about setting up the Nova Scotia Paramedic Society. Subsequently, the group registered the society with the Nova Scotia Registry of Joint Stock Companies on September 28, 2011.

== Projects ==
- Medic Monday
- Public Archive Days - Researching newspapers and health records
- 1954 Pontiac Ambulance Restoration Project
- Weekly Emergency Communications Podcast: The Last Wire Podcast

== Structure ==
The society has a central executive and regional groups and representatives, intended to act as a conduit for information to and from Nova Scotian paramedics.

== Membership ==
There are currently three levels of membership available within the society

- Full - past and present Nova Scotian paramedics (registered with EHS or Ambulance Operators Association of Nova Scotia).
- Student - persons currently undertaking an EHS approved course leading to eligibility to apply to the register
- Associate - anyone with an interest in the furtherance of the aims of the society, the ambulance professional, and pre-hospital care

== See also ==
- Paramedic Association of Canada
