= Tri-Star Industries =

Canadian ambulance manufacturer

Tri-Star Industries is a Canadian manufacturer of ambulances and specialty vehicles based in Yarmouth, Nova Scotia.

== History ==
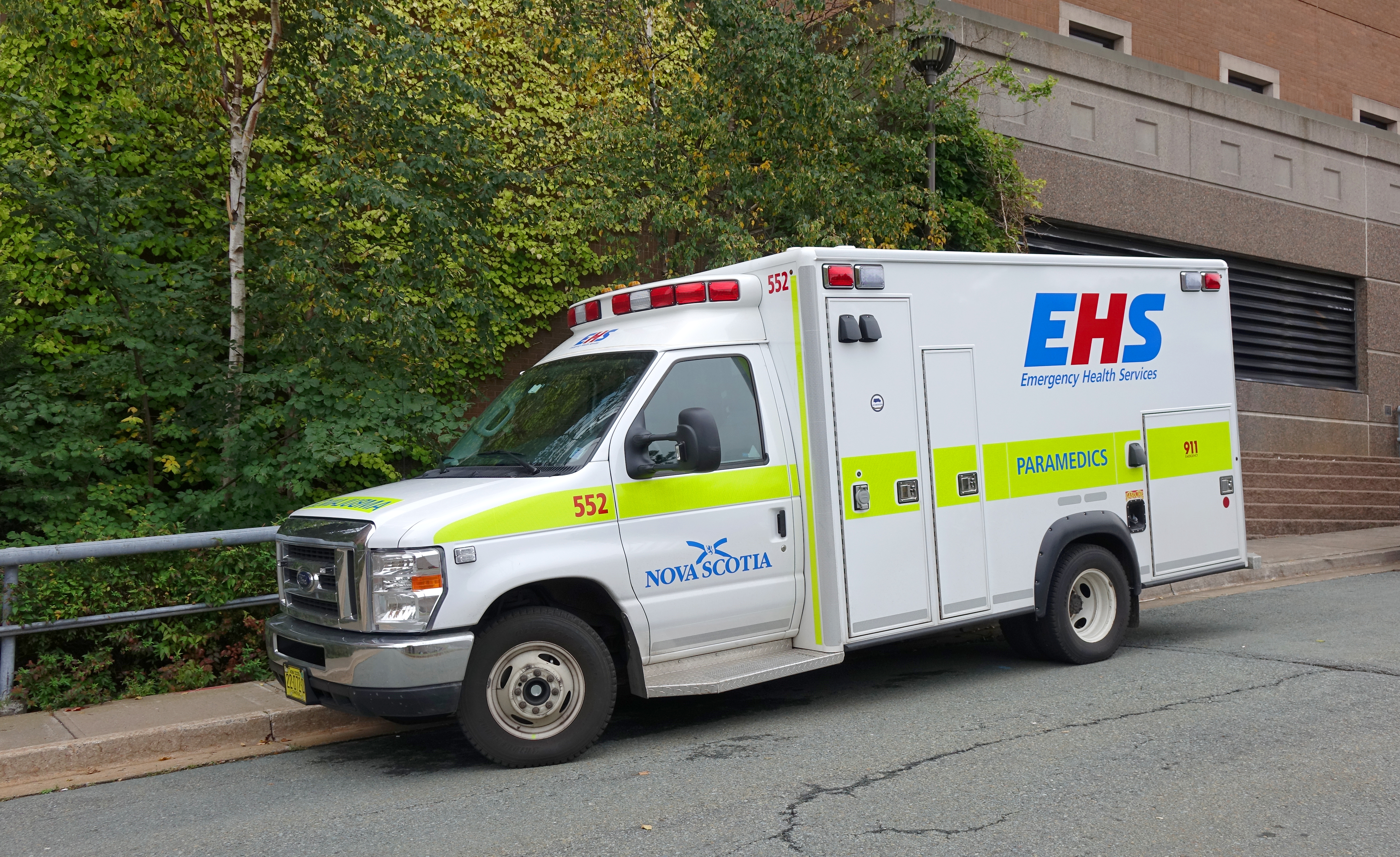
Tri-Star manufactures ambulances for Emergency Health Services.

Tri-Star Industries was established in 1973 in Yarmouth, Nova Scotia, as a branch of a local automobile dealership. The company manufactures ambulances and emergency vehicles for Nova Scotia's Emergency Health Services, and their products are exported worldwide. Their mobile stroke ambulance was the first of its kind, including a hospital grade CT scanner on an ambulance platform. Every ambulance in Nova Scotia is owned by Tri-Star, which leases them to the province. The company manufactures specialty ambulances for the Canadian Department of National Defence and the RCMP.

In 2015, Tri-Star Industries was sold to three members of the company's management, who acquired 100% of the company.

Tri-Star has been doing business in Iraq since 1979, when the company began dealing internationally. After attending a trade show in Baghdad, the company received their first order from the Iraqi government for 50 ambulances. The following year, they received another order from Iraq for an additional 300 ambulances. During the COVID-19 pandemic, Tri-Star Industries manufactured four mobile intensive care units for the Iraqi Ministry of Health.

== See also ==
- Crestline Coach – another Canadian company manufacturing emergency vehicles
