= Ambulance New Brunswick =

Ambulance New Brunswick - Ambulance Nouveau Brunswick
- Established: 2007
- Headquarters: Moncton, New Brunswick
- Jurisdiction: Provincial
- Website: www.ambulancenb.ca/fr-fr/Pages/home.aspx

Ambulance New Brunswick (French: Ambulance Nouveau Brunswick), also referred to as ANB, is a provincial Crown corporation administered by the Department of Health in the Canadian province of New Brunswick.

All ground ambulance and air ambulance service in New Brunswick is contracted by ANB to New Brunswick EMS Inc., a subsidiary of Medavie Health Services.

ANB is responsible for administering New Brunswick's pre-hospital emergency health services, which is delivered by NB EMS through a fleet of ground ambulances and their support facilities. ANB also provides critical care air ambulance services through their Aircare program, using fixed-wing aircraft. The province employs approximately 800 paramedics.

ANB leases all ground ambulances from Malley Industries in Moncton, NB; it leases support facilities under long-term agreements, which are operated under contract by NB EMS.

NB EMS operates a central, provincial 911 ambulance dispatch centre in Moncton, entitled Medical Communications Management Centre, which coordinates emergency medical services across the province.

== History ==
Prior to December 16, 2007, New Brunswick relied on approximately 52 private, public and volunteer ambulance operators to provide emergency medical care. The level of medical care, staff qualifications and type and condition of ambulances and supplies varied throughout the province.

Following the lead of Nova Scotia in 1994 and Prince Edward Island in 2005, the Government of New Brunswick created ANB on June 6, 2007 and began provincial operations on December 16, 2007. A 10-year performance-based operating contract was awarded to New Brunswick EMS Inc. which is a subsidiary of Medavie EMS. Medavie EMS also operates ambulance services in Nova Scotia and Prince Edward Island.

== See also ==
- LifeFlight
