= D. Gregory Powell =

Canadian physician (1947–2025)

Dwight Gregory Powell OC AOE FRCPC
- Born: November 24, 1947; Welland, Ontario, Canada
- Died: April 30, 2025 (aged 77); Okotoks, Alberta, Canada
- Occupation: Emergency physician
- Known for: Founding Shock Trauma Air Rescue Service (STARS)

Dwight Gregory Powell (November 24, 1947 – April 30, 2025) was a Canadian emergency medicine physician specialist in Foothills, Alberta and a professor of family medicine and emergency medicine at the Faculty of Medicine of the University of Calgary. He was also the founder and CEO of the nonprofit Shock Trauma Air Rescue Society (STARS), a helicopter-based emergency transport service in Alberta and British Columbia.

== Early life and education ==
After graduating from Strathcona Composite High School and attending medical school at the University of British Columbia, he spent time as an observer in the Vietnam War. This experience showed him the advantage of using aircraft to get critically ill people to medical treatment. In the 1970s, while a resident physician at the University of Calgary, Powell served as chief of the emergency department at the university's Foothills Medical Centre. He had also been trained as a pilot. "I saw people coming into our care who could be salvaged if we had a bit more speed and talent applied to the pre-hospital part of their care," he later said. So he decided to create an air medical transport service for Calgary. He was a Royal College of Physicians and Surgeons of Canada Fellow in Emergency Medicine from 1983.

== STARS ==
Knowing that helicopters were by far the most efficient means of moving severely ill or injured patients, he created a nonprofit organization, Shock Trauma Air Rescue Services Foundation, to provide helicopter rescue and transport in and around Calgary. The local Lions Club provided seed money. The Foundation created its working arm, Shock Trauma Air Rescue Society (STARS), which carried out its first mission on December 1, 1985. Since then more than 42,000 flights have been carried out. The service currently operates from three bases in Alberta, two in Saskatchewan and one in Manitoba.

Powell served as founder, president and CEO of STARS for 27 years. In April 2012, he gave up the roles of president and CEO to Andrea Robertson, while remaining actively involved as Founder.

== Recognition ==
In July 2006, he was appointed an Officer of the Order of Canada. Also in 2006, he was given the Medal for Distinguished Service by the Alberta Medical Association.

In November 2012, he was presented with a Queen Elizabeth II Diamond Jubilee Medal.

In 2012, he was given the Marriott-Carlson Lifetime Achievement Award, presented at the annual Air Medical Transport Conference in Seattle.

In November 2015, an official ceremony was held at the McCaig Tower at the Foothills Medical Centre in Calgary to name the helipad the Dr. Gregory Powell Helipad.

On June 7, 2018, Powell was officially inducted to Canada's Aviation Hall of Fame during a ceremony.

In 2021, he was inducted to the Alberta Order of Excellence.

== Death ==
Powell died surrounded by family at Foothills Hospice in Okotoks, on April 30, 2025, aged 77.
