= Shock Trauma Air Rescue Service =

Canadian air ambulance service

- STARS logo
IATA	ICAO	Call sign
-	-	-
- Commenced operations: 1985
- Operating bases: Calgary; Edmonton; Grande Prairie; Regina; Saskatoon; Winnipeg
- Fleet size: See Fleet below
- Parent company: Shock Trauma Air Rescue Service
- Headquarters: Calgary, Alberta, Canada
- Key people: D. Gregory Powell (Founder)
- Website: stars.ca

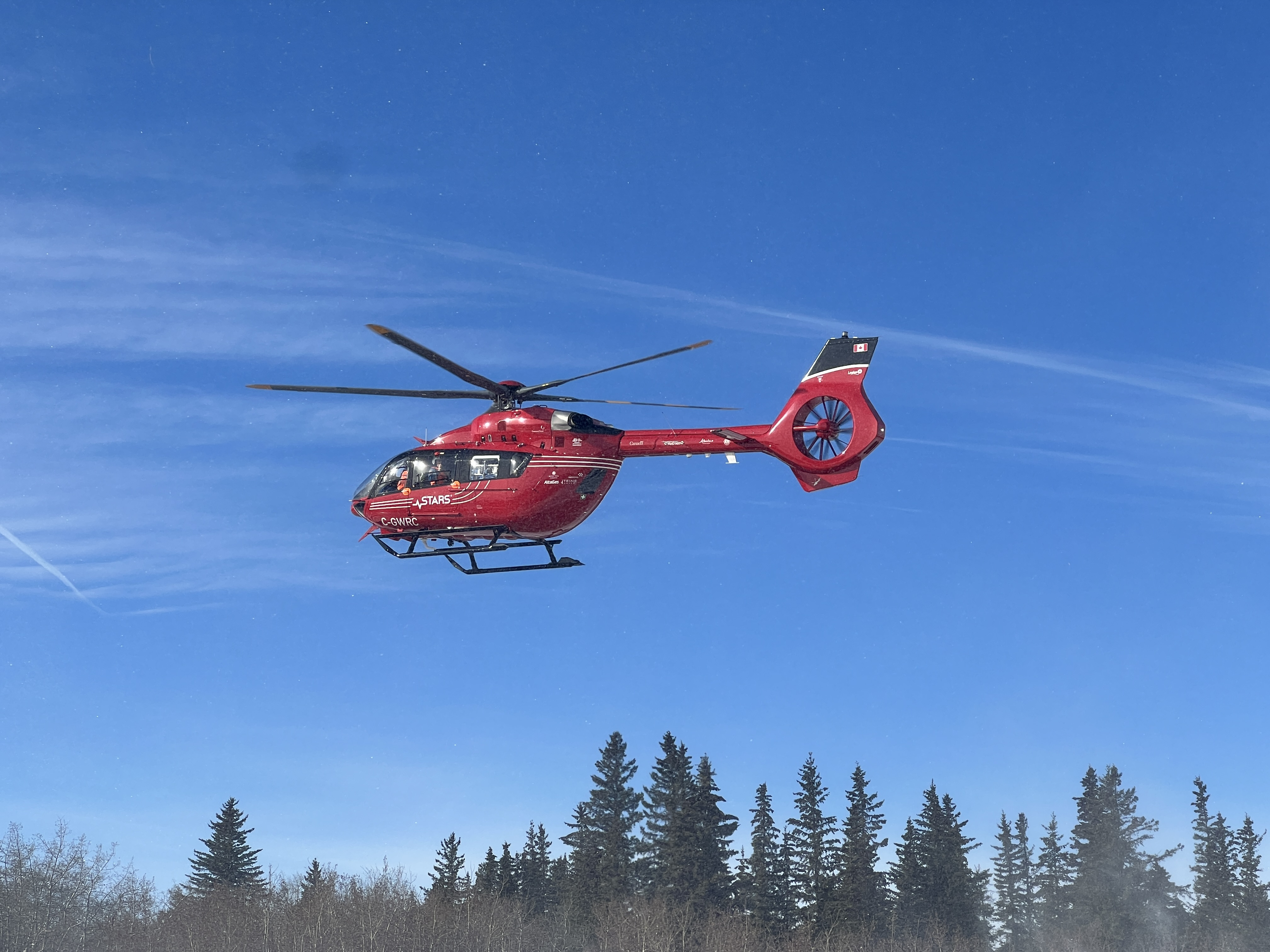
STARS Helicopter Taking off

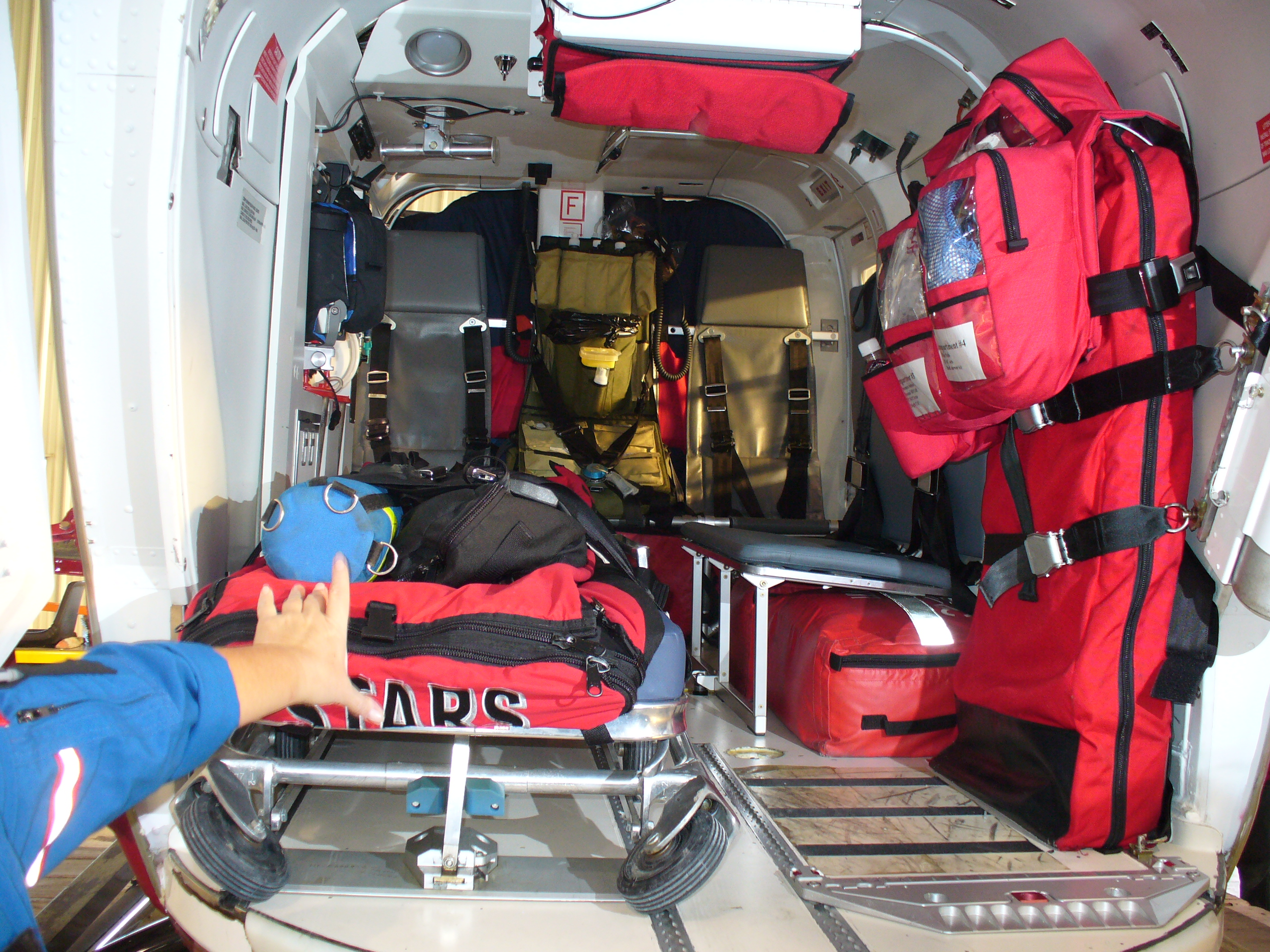
STARS Air Ambulance Interior

The Shock Trauma Air Rescue Service (STARS, formerly Shock Trauma Air Rescue Society) is a Canadian non-profit helicopter air ambulance organization funded by individual donors, service groups, corporate donors and government contributions. STARS provides rapid and specialized emergency care and transportation for critically ill and injured patients. STARS operates from bases in Calgary, Edmonton, Grande Prairie, Regina, Saskatoon, Winnipeg and formerly Halifax (replaced by EHS LifeFlight).

== History ==
STARS was formed in Calgary, Alberta to provide emergency medical care and transport to the critically ill and injured after founder Dr. Gregory Powell, who was working as an emergency room physician at the time, lost a patient: a young mother who died en route to the hospital because of the time it took to transport her by ground from her rural home. Powell had worked as a physician on Mobile Army Surgical Hospital (MASH) units during the Vietnam War and knew that a helicopter ambulance service could mean the difference between life and death for critical patients who need immediate assistance and are not near a major trauma centre.

He created a nonprofit organization, Shock Trauma Air Rescue Services Foundation, to provide helicopter rescue and transport in and around Calgary. The local Lions Club provided seed money. The Foundation created its working arm, Shock Trauma Air Rescue Service (STARS), which carried out its first mission on December 1, 1985. Since then, more than 24,000 missions have been carried out.

In 2012, Andrea Robertson was named president and chief executive officer of STARS, replacing Powell, who had served in that role for 27 years.

== Personnel and equipment ==
Over the years, the STARS fleet has grown from a single helicopter to seven Eurocopter BK117s serving eastern British Columbia, Alberta, Saskatchewan and Manitoba. The BK117 helicopter covers an approximate 250 km radius and can hold one critical patient or can be converted to hold two patients should circumstances require. The operating range can be extended further when refuelling is available.

STARS announced the arrival of its new donor funded AgustaWestland AW139 helicopter at the STARS Edmonton base in December 2012. The helicopter is the first of two new AW139 helicopters purchased by STARS for service in Alberta, with the second AW139 arriving in late 2013. The new helicopters will enhance access to emergency pre-hospital critical care through more rapid response, an expanded service area, a larger medical interior, more powerful lift capacity, and a de-icing system that will enable flight during adverse weather conditions.

The first of the two AW139 helicopters is now operating in Edmonton, while the second is operating in Calgary. A third AW139, purchased through the support of Potash Corporation, is deployed to the Saskatoon base.

The STARS Air Medical crew (AMC) consists of a critical care registered nurse (RN) and advanced care paramedic (ACP). Emergency flight physicians known as transport physicians (TP) also fly with the crew on approximately 25 per cent of responses, and are available for telephone consultation during every mission via the emergency link centre which also provides flight following services. The medical interior includes extensive critical care equipment including a transport ventilator, portable blood gas analyzers, invasive monitoring equipment, video laryngoscopes and point of care ultrasound. Flight physicians carry additional equipment to perform surgical procedures such as chest tube insertion and field amputations. On occasion specialty paediatric and neonatal transport teams will be added when required.

The flight crew consists of two pilots for every mission with at least one captain. STARS captains have a minimum of 3,000 hours flying experience and are trained to fly with night vision goggles. The helicopters also have powerful search lights and can participate in search and rescue missions when tasked.

== Alberta ==
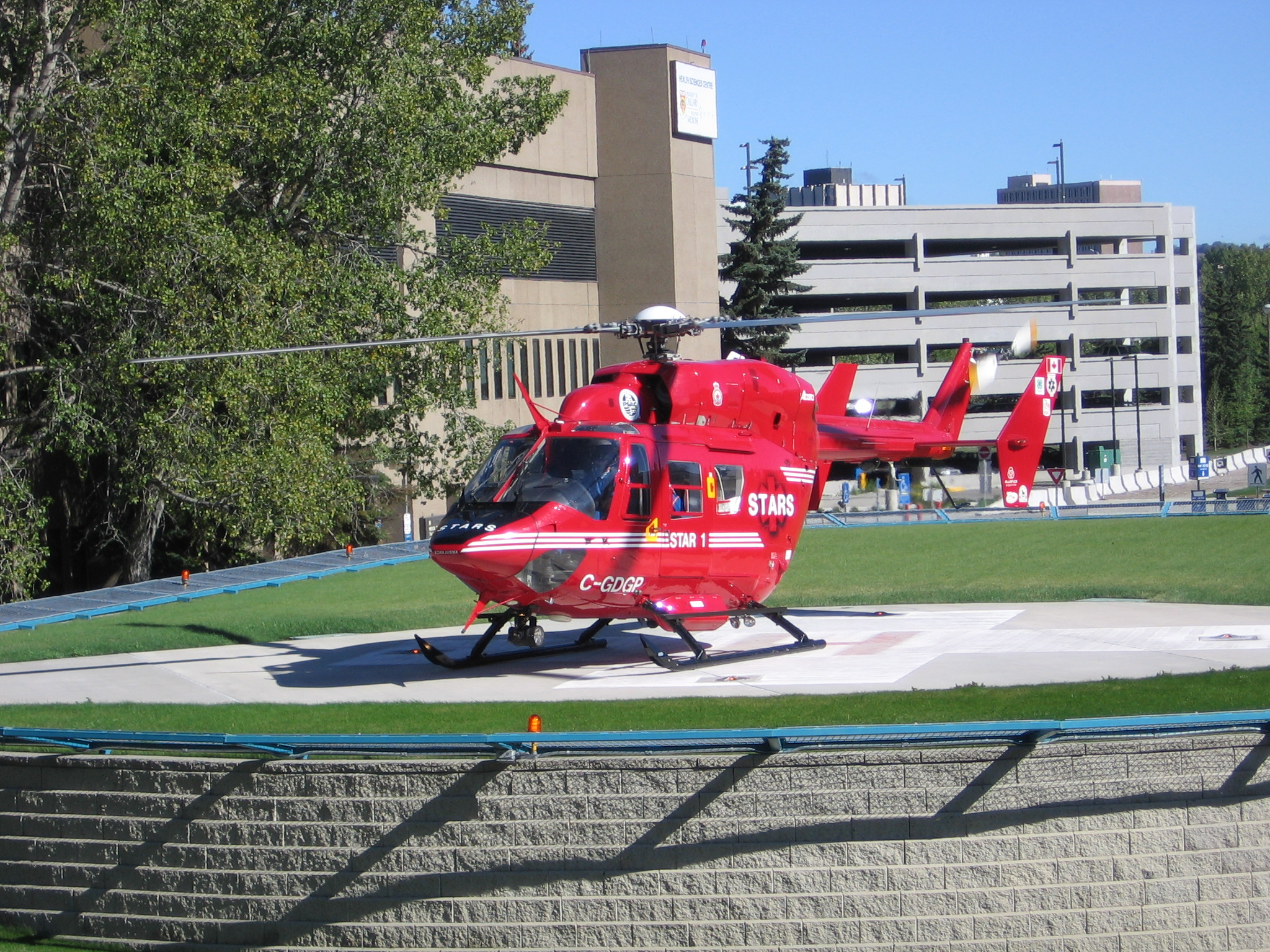
STARS Air Ambulance at Foothills Medical Centre

The first STARS base opened in Calgary in 1985 under the original name of the Lions Air Ambulance Service. The Lions Club provided the first helicopter, a white BK117 with the Lions Club banner on the side. The Lions Air Ambulance Service's first mission was in December 1985, the transport of a critically ill infant to a hospital in Calgary. In 1988 STARS' received formal recognition as an essential service when the organization was integrated into emergency planning for the Calgary Olympic Winter Games.

In 1991 the STARS Edmonton base was established and conducted its first mission in October of that year. The Edmonton base initially operated out of the Edmonton City Centre Airport and has since moved to the Edmonton International Airport.

In 1996, the STARS Emergency Link Centre (ELC) was established with funding received from the Canadian Association of Petroleum Producers. In Alberta and Saskatchewan the STARS ELC acts as an advanced 24-hour communication centre linking emergency services, physicians, hospital personnel and EMS into one call. In Manitoba, these services are handled by the province's Medical Transportation Coordination Centre.

The STARS ELC also provides a site registration program whereby an average of 4,000 remote work sites are connected directly to the centre on any given day for immediate response when emergencies occur.

In 1998, the STARS Seconds Count Capital Campaign was launched to buy two STARS helicopters and establish the STARS Legacy Fund. STARS also received full accreditation as an international critical-care provider from the Commission on Accreditation of Medical Transport Systems (CAMTS). The Human Patient Simulator program was established in Alberta through the support of founding donors.

In 2001, the International Association of Air Medical Services awarded STARS the prestigious Program of the Year award. STARS was the first international and first Canadian program to receive this honour. In this same year, STARS also purchased a fourth BK117 helicopter.

STARS opened a third base in Alberta in 2006 in Grande Prairie and in its first year, STARS flew more than 116 missions out of Grand Prairie.

== Saskatchewan ==
STARS launched operations in Saskatchewan in 2012 with BK117 helicopters based at the Regina International Airport and the Saskatoon International Airport, flying 217 missions in 2012. The Saskatoon base was equipped with an AW139 helicopter until fall 2019, which was funded through a donation by Potash Corp. STARS currently conducts 24/7 operations from both their Saskatoon and Regina bases using the H145 Helicopter.

STARS also coordinates with Saskatchewan Air Ambulance Service, which operates four King Air B200 aircraft based out of the Saskatoon John G. Diefenbaker International Airport.

== Manitoba ==
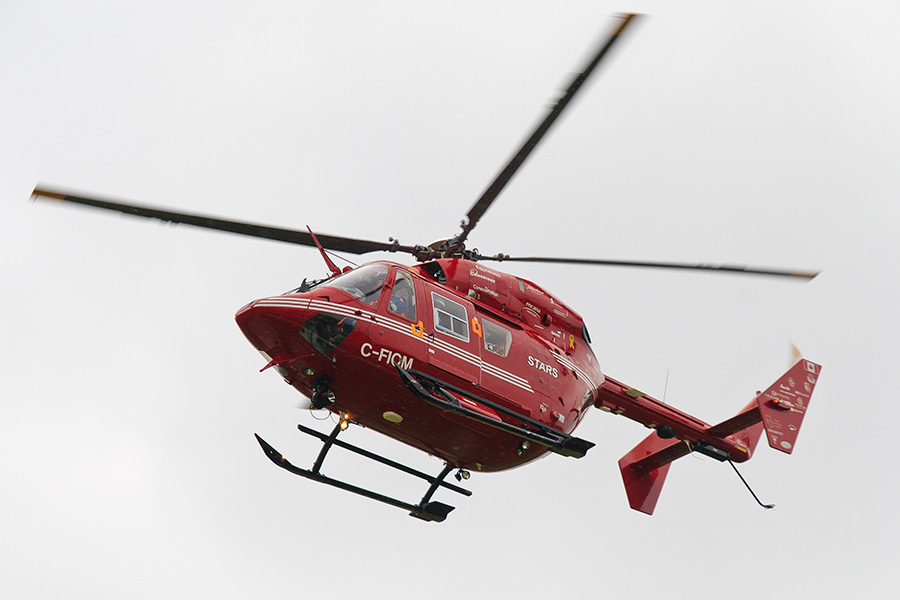
STARS BK117

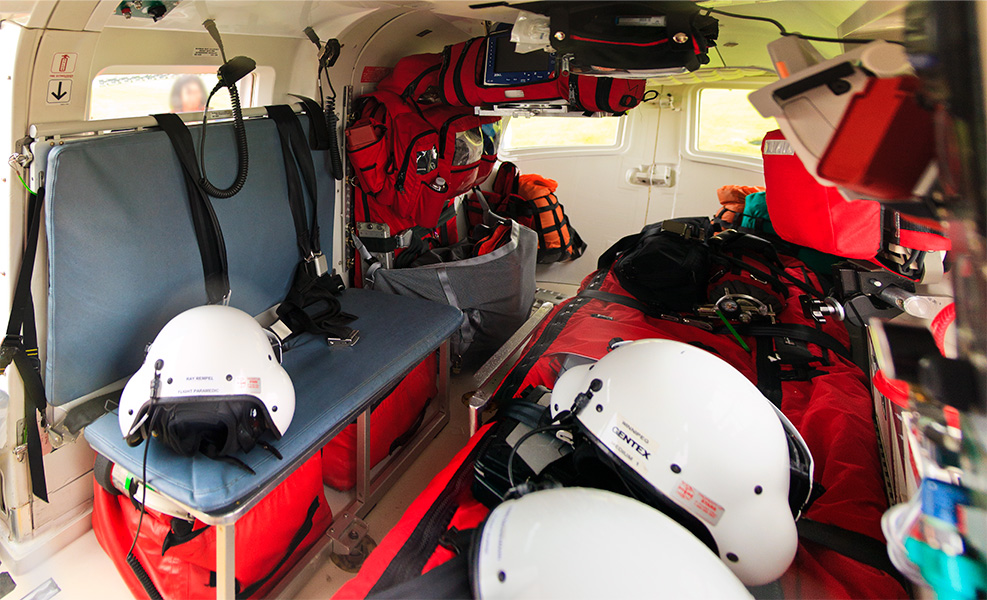
STARS BK117 interior

In 2009 and 2011, STARS was contracted to the Government of Manitoba to assist with emergency response during major flooding that affected the province. In June 2011, STARS was asked by the provincial government to maintain a permanent base within the province. Shortly after, STARS signed a 10-year service agreement with the Government of Manitoba on February 22, 2012, to provide helicopter air ambulance service to Manitoba. The Province of Manitoba expanded the contract of STARS in 2020 as they took over the responsibilities of Lifeflight which include air ambulance and transportation. This contract saw STARS provide air medical crews on fixed-wing aircraft that are operated by a third party and dispatched when it is determined that a fixed-wing aircraft is the best option for patients.

STARS operates on the west side of the Winnipeg International Airport, in close proximity to CFB Winnipeg, using the Airbus H145. STARS currently conducts 24/7 operations from their Winnipeg base. After ten years in Manitoba and as of December 2021, STARS has conducted more than 5000 missions from the Winnipeg site.

In Manitoba, STARS is dispatched from the provincial Medical Transportation Coordination Center (MTCC) in Brandon, MB. The MTCC is the EMS dispatch centre for rural Manitoba outside of the City of Winnipeg.

== Nova Scotia ==
STARS managed the air ambulance service in Nova Scotia from 1996 until 2001, when their contract was not renewed. Then Health Minister Jamie Muir, cited "fundamental differences" regarding the foundation's corporate fundraising.

== Funding ==
STARS is a non-profit charitable organization. The Shock Trauma Air Rescue Service Foundation (STARS Foundation) is the fundraising arm for STARS. Funding needs are met through private donations received from individuals, service groups, businesses, corporations and affiliation agreements with provincial governments.

STARS also holds lotteries in Alberta and Saskatchewan which are the single largest source of fundraising for the organization. Financial statements and annual reports are available at the STARS website.

== Expenses ==
During the 2023 fiscal period, the Shock Trauma Air Rescue Service charitable organization had an expense total of $78,657,331, 87.80% of which went to charitable programs and 12.20% went to management and administration. The funding arm of STARS, the Shock Trauma Air Rescue Service Foundation, had an expense total of $56,287,458 during the 2023 fiscal period. Of that total, 51.73% went to STARS, 45.30% went to fundraising, and 2.97% went to management and administration.

== Fleet ==
Current fleet for STARS:

- 4 Eurocopter BK117
- 2 AgustaWestland AW139 (Retired September 2020)
- 10 Airbus H145
