= Saskatchewan Air Ambulance =

Saskatchewan Air Ambulance (also called LIFEGUARD) is the air ambulance service for the province of Saskatchewan and for the Ministry of Health (Saskatchewan).

== History ==
Celebrating 80 years of service in 2026, the air ambulance program was established in 1946 as the first non-military air medical transport program in the world; since October 2008, the Ministry of Health administers the program with operations handled by the Saskatoon Health Region. Lifeguard completes about 1,500 flights per year, both within and outside of Saskatchewan.

== Aircraft Fleet ==
The program makes use of four Beechcraft Super King Air B200 aircraft based out of the Saskatoon John G. Diefenbaker International Airport. The service also makes use of contracted service from providers such as Transwest Air.

The Saskatchewan Air Ambulance Service also coordinates with Shock Trauma Air Rescue Society, that is being contracted to station helicopters at both the Saskatoon and Regina airports.

The aircraft are available to transport critically ill and injured patients 24 hours a day, every day in most weather conditions. The air ambulances can be dispatched for an emergency within 30 minutes of a call.

== Incidents ==
Around 12:00pm on January 3, 2011, Lifeguard 3 touched down on a snow-covered runway at Maple Creek Airport. The left main gear contacted a 14-inch windrow, causing the pilot to lose directional control. The aircraft departed the runway surface, causing the left main gear and nose gear to collapse. The nose section and propellers were damaged. The pilot, nurse and paramedic were not injured. Lifeguard 3 is repaired and back to full service.
