= Ambulance Operators Association of Nova Scotia =

Ambulance Operators Association of Nova Scotia (AOANS)
- Motto: Providing care for the sick and injured
- Established: 1970
- Headquarters: Dartmouth, Nova Scotia
- Jurisdiction: Provincial

The Ambulance Operators Association of Nova Scotia (AOANS) was the provincial association representing ambulance company owners in Nova Scotia. The association's focus was negotiating with the Government of Nova Scotia over funding and private ownership of ambulance services. The AOANS was also contracted by the Government of Nova Scotia to provide a training program for ambulance personnel and an ambulance inspection program. Between 1994 and 1999, after the publication of the Murphy Report, Nova Scotia transitioned to a single ambulance service provider. This resulted in the AOANS members being bought–out and their ambulance services merged into the new system. The AOANS was formally dissolved in 2002.

== History ==
=== Early history ===
Prior to 1968, the vast majority of ambulance services in Nova Scotia were based out of funeral homes. The funeral homes had been the only service available twenty-four hours day with vehicles capable of transporting patients in a horizontal position. In 1968, eight Nova Scotia funeral homes decided to remove ambulances from their list of services provided to their community. Originally intended as just a favour for neighbours, the funeral homes became unable to meet demand. Robert Schaffner was instrumental in forming the AOANS in 1969 and subsequently served as its president for many years. The original 28 funeral home and ambulance company owners who had formed the AOANS, presented two requests to the then Health Minister Richard Donahoe:

- The provincial government takes over ambulance services with the assistance of ambulance company owners.
- The provincial government financially assists existing ambulance company owners in upgrading services and providing real ambulance services to the public.

Donahoe was not receptive to either request, but Dr. Tom McKeough (then Minister of Municipal Affairs) accepted something had to be done. The Department of Municipal Affairs thus provided $300,000 for an ambulance subsidy. In June 1971, due to public apathy and lack of government funding, AOANS voted to withdraw services. After the strike, additional funding was subsequently provided with the intent to increase the standard of ambulance services.

=== Post-1990 ===
In early 1990s, the Nova Scotia Department of Health (DOH) administered the contract between the Ambulance Operators Association of Nova Scotia and the Province of Nova Scotia. This contract did not specify standards for response times nor establish levels of medical care to be provided, rather it primarily specified claim evaluation and payment.

In 1993, Cape Breton Island native Dr. Ron Stewart, who had been instrumental in organizing emergency medical services in southern California earlier in his career during the 1970s, was elected to the Nova Scotia House of Assembly and was appointed the Minister of Health. Stewart commissioned several reports on health care reform, one of which – Report: Emergency Health Services Nova Scotia (the "Murphy Report") – was conducted by Dr Mike Murphy, the director of emergency services at the Isaac Walton Killam Children's Hospital. It offered a comprehensive evaluation on the state of the province's ambulances. Murphy was critical of the AOANS for primarily being concerned with dictating prices to the government with little concern for standards for response times or levels of care. Stewart stated "No more. It will now be on our terms. The reform will be very deep." The recommendations of the Murphy Report were subsequently adopted and by 1994 the transformation of Nova Scotia's ambulance system had begun, with the provincial government taking over control of ground ambulance operations and consolidating them into a single entity called Emergency Health Services.

Before 1995, there were over 50 funeral home, private and public ambulance company owners belonging to AOANS. The ambulance companies had inconsistencies in terms of medical care provided to patients, levels of staff qualifications, the type and condition of ambulances, and working conditions for staff. Oftentimes, the type of care patients received was dependent on where they resided in the province.

Between 1994 and 1999, the contract for ground ambulance services in Nova Scotia was gradually taken over by the newly formed department of Emergency Health Services (EHSNS), Nova Scotia Department of Health. The Department of Health's EHSNS negotiated buy–out terms with each of the AOANS operators in the province. Then a single private ambulance company, Emergency Medical Care Inc (EMC), executed the purchases. All private companies were now consolidated under a single ambulance company for the entire province. Emergency Medical Care Inc is a subsidiary of Medavie Health Services that, along with Medavie Blue Cross, is part of the Medavie group of companies.

The last AOANS board, listed as 1138315 NOVA SCOTIA LIMITED in the Nova Scotia Registry of Joint Stocks, included Arnold Rovers as President/Director and Lawrence Stordy as Secretary. The Effective Date of Strike Off was October 12, 2002.

== Education and certification ==
Pre-1970, ambulance drivers were not required to have any training to transport the sick and injured in Nova Scotia.

In the mid-1970s, ambulance drivers were only required to have a class 4 drivers license and first-aid training.

In 1980, the first two-week AOANS training program was launched with ambulance attendants being trained to level of Emergency Medical Attendant (EMA)
AOANS, in conjunction with the Government of Nova Scotia Department of Health, was responsible for the Emergency Medical Attendant (EMA) certification of ambulance attendants. This certification was not recognized outside the province of Nova Scotia. Training officers for the AOANS training department included Bob Treat, George Dunne (Lead), Ricky J Smith (Lead), Douglas Denike, Dwayne Semple, Gerry Parfitt, Paul Harnish (Lead), Dan O'Neill, Darrell MacLeod, and Jack Cook. The training department closed in 1996 following the start of the inaugural PCP class at the School of Allied Health, now defunct.

Currently in Nova Scotia, only one institution offers a nationally accredited paramedic course - Medavie Health Services, a branch of Medavie Blue Cross. Medavie subsidiary Emergency Medical Care has been contracted to provide ambulance services in Nova Scotia. Registration to practice as a Primary Care Paramedic or Advanced Care Paramedic in Nova Scotia is overseen by Emergency Health Services NS, a division of the NS Department of Health and Wellness.
