= College of Paramedics of Nova Scotia =

Canadian regulatory college

The College of Paramedics of Nova Scotia (CPNS) is the regulatory college for medical paramedic in Nova Scotia, Canada.

The college issues certificates of registration for all paramedics to allow them to practise medicine as well as: monitors and maintains standards of practice via assessment and remediation, investigates complaints against paramedics, and disciplines those found guilty of professional misconduct and/or incompetence.

The CPNS's power is derived from Paramedics Act and the Medicine Act. The college is based in Halifax.

== Committee structure ==
- Registration Committee & Mandate
- Registration Appeal Committee & Mandate
- Investigation Committee & Mandate
- Hearing Committee & Mandate

== Council of the College of Paramedics ==
Government has appointed members of the initial Council of the College of Paramedics of Nova Scotia.

- Dr. Andrew Travers, Provincial Medical Director;
- Donna Denney, College of Registered Nurses of Nova Scotia;
- Dr. Elizabeth Mann, College of Physicians and Surgeons of Nova Scotia
- Bud Avery, Manager, Paramedic Regulatory Affairs, Emergency Health Services

=== Professional staff ===
- Karl Kowalczyk, Registrar / Executive Director
- Nicole Webb, Administrative Coordinator

=== Paramedic members ===
- Laura Hirello, three-year term
- Michael Lockett, three-year term
- Bruce Sangster, three-year term
- Zachary Fitzsimmons, three-year term
- Kevin Carey, three-year term
- Barry Tracey, three-year term
- Sandee Crooks, three-year term
- Kirk Outhouse, three-year term

=== Public members ===
- Donny Denney, three-year term.
- Nicholas E. Burke, three-year term.
