= Angels of Flight Canada =

Canadian owned and operated air and ground ambulance service

Angels of Flight Canada is a Canadian owned and operated air and ground ambulance service based in Peterborough, Ontario, Canada. It transports patients to and from 104 different countries.

== History ==
Angels of Flight Canada was established in 1988 by Gail Courneyea, a critical care registered nurse at the Peterborough Civic Hospital for 16 years. In 1986, Courneyea was asked to accompany a patient on an air ambulance. She felt very uncomfortable during the 20-minute flight as she was working in a foreign environment and had a fear of flying. Determined to overcome her fears, Courneyea received a certificate in aeromedical care and her private pilot's licence in the United States in 1987. She founded Angels of Flight Canada Inc. in 1988 since provincial health insurance does not cover travel outside a province, and no employment as a flight nurse existed in Canada at the time.

=== Air medical transport ===
Since its inception, Angels of Flight Canada has employed aeromedical trained RNs, paramedics and physicians and has successfully transported thousands of patients on private and commercial planes. Clients are referred from private inquiries, hospitals, insurance companies and government departments, such as Canada Border Services Agency and Canadian Foreign Affairs.

=== HALO membership ===
On January 24, 2015, Angels Of Flight released a new type of membership that bridges the gap left by travel insurers. With 26 years experience in Air Ambulance service, it was suiting to have a proactive card that stores all your vital information in times of crisis. A one of kind travel medical information card that connects your information with medical professionals worldwide in case of illness or injury.

=== Education and consulting ===
In 1993, an education division, Exodus Academy, was established to provide aeromedical education programs to health care and aviation professionals. In 2007, the Exodus Academy held the Challenges of In-Flight Safety conference. In May 2010, an online training program, Exodus Air and Medical Studies, was initiated to make aeromedical training more readily accessible.

=== Global Angel charitable organization ===
Following the loss of her daughter to leukemia, Courneyea founded a registered charity in 2007 known as Global Angel. The mandate of the charity is to provide assistance for medical transport to those in need of treatment, repatriation, and benevolent needs regardless of financial status. Global Angel assists patients through corporate and private donations and utilizes various media outlets and fundraising efforts.

Since its inception, Global Angel has assisted numerous patients, many of whom were suffering from terminal illnesses and wanted to be home with family in their final days. In January 2010, Global Angel and Angels of Flight Canada assisted Canadian Medical Assistance Teams (CMAT) and other medical relief organizations mobilize their teams to earthquake-stricken Haiti.

=== Medical tourism ===
In November 2010, the Angels Global Healthcare division was started to meet the needs of an increasing number of patients seeking private and global healthcare options. Angels Global Healthcare representatives attended the 3rd World Medical Tourism & Global Healthcare Congress in Los Angeles in September 2010. In December 2010, Angels Global Healthcare was certified by the Medical Tourism Association as a medical tourism facilitator company.

== Awards and certification ==
Gail Courneyea has won numerous awards for her work with Angels of Flight Canada, including 1993 Woman of the Year by the Peterborough YWCA, 2003 Women in Business by The Examiner, and 2017 Premier's Award in Health Sciences by Seneca Polytechnic. It is ISO 9001-2008 certified through NFS and maintains an A+ rating with the Better Business Bureau.

== See also ==
- Aeromedical evacuation
