= Emergency Medical Care =

Emergency Medical Care Inc.
- Type: Subsidiary
- Industry: Healthcare
- Founded: 1998
- Headquarters: Dartmouth, Nova Scotia
- Key people: Matthew Crossman, COO
- Products: Ambulance services
- Number of employees: 2,000
- Parent: Medavie Health Services
- Website: www.emci.ca

Emergency Medical Care Inc. (EMC) is the private company which provides all ground ambulance, medical communications, and air ambulance services in Nova Scotia, Canada. EMC is a subsidiary of Medavie Health Services and operates under contract from the Nova Scotia government's Emergency Health Services.

== History ==
Emergency Medical Care Inc. (EMC) has been a service provider since the inception of the province-wide system in 1998, which involved the amalgamation of 59 separate service providers across Nova Scotia to create a province-wide and integrated system.

== Activities ==
The Extended Care Program: The main goal of an ECP is to respond to non-emergency calls in nursing homes where they will assess and potentially treat patients on site. This will reduce the need for some patients to go to hospital via ambulance and wait in the emergency department for several hours, thus creating a more personal approach to health care by allowing patients and their families to remain in a comfortable environment for as long as possible.

The Clinical Support Desk: Historically, a high volume of calls to EHS are non-emergency and as such, automatically dispatching an ambulance may not best address patient needs nor is it the best use of resources. However, the current system is not set up to provide alternate levels of care or transport. A first of its kind in Canada, a Clinical Support Desk (CSD) will handle these low-acuity calls. Paramedics and nurses, with active clinical experience, are recruited, trained and in place at the CSD to make clinical decisions in offering alternative pathways to non-emergency care, conducting follow up calls to high-risk patients not transported and providing clinical support to field staff. The role of the CSD will always be developing and supported by the EHS Provincial Medical Director.

== Support services ==
- Peer & Family Support Services
- Operation Safety Coach
- Joint Occupational Health & Safety Committee (JOHSC)
- EHS Research Committee
- Emergency Preparedness & Special Operations Team
- Health & Wellness Program
