= LifeFlight (Nova Scotia) =

Aeromedical organisation in Canada

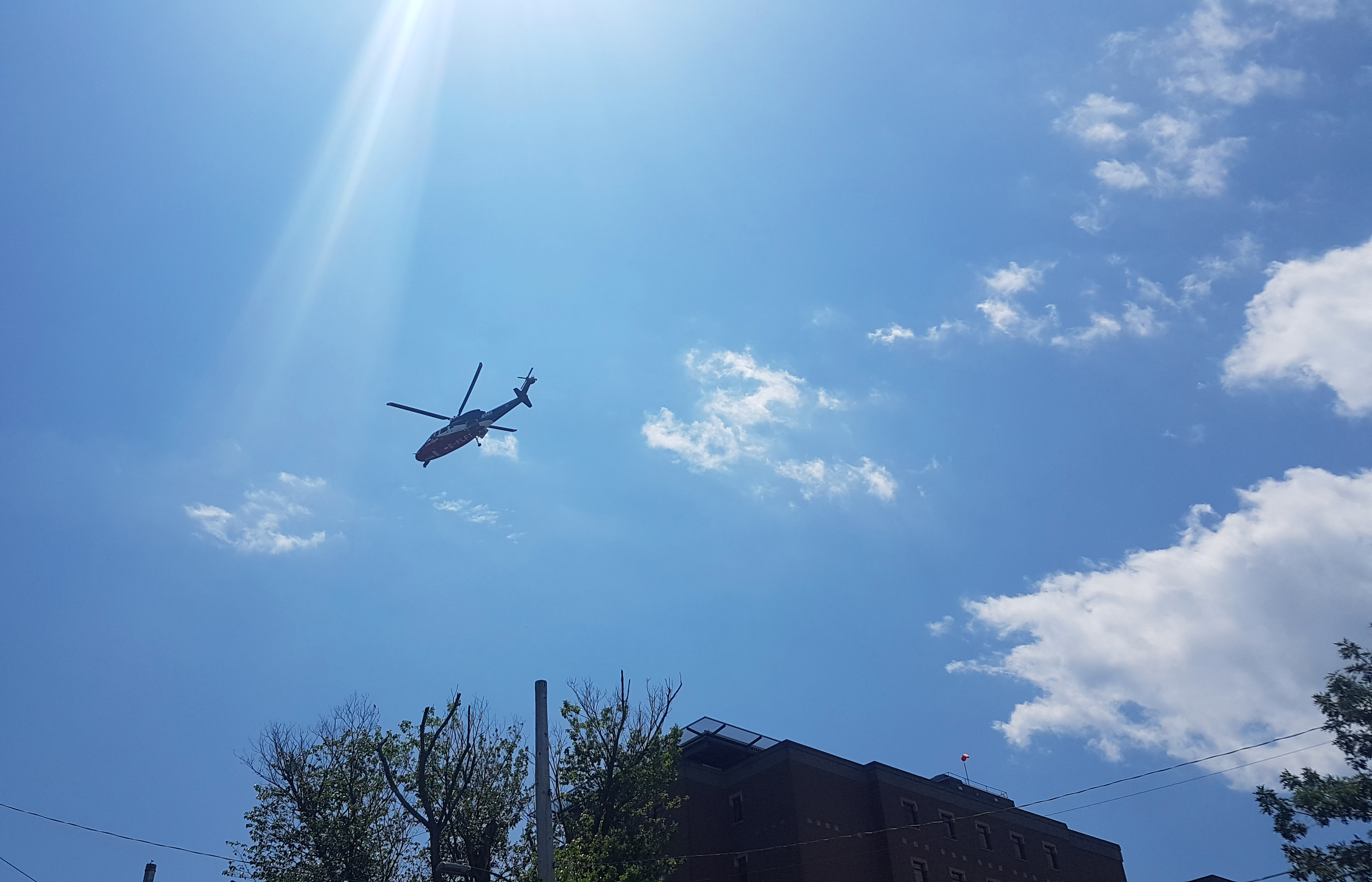
LifeFlight helicopter taking off from the Halifax Infirmary

LifeFlight is an air ambulance critical care transport service that operates in the Canadian provinces of Nova Scotia, New Brunswick and Prince Edward Island.

EHS LifeFlight is delivered under contract to the Government of Nova Scotia's Department of Health by Emergency Medical Care Inc. (EMC). EMC is a subsidiary of Medavie Health Services that, along with Medavie Blue Cross, is part of the Medavie group of companies. EMC provides medical staff however the operation of the helicopter is sub-contracted to Canadian Helicopters Limited.

EHS LifeFlight is subsidized for Nova Scotian residents and no fees are charged to patients or sending hospitals or agencies in that province. Prince Edward Island and New Brunswick contract this service and may charge a fee to their residents. Fees are charged to non-Canadian residents.

== History ==
Nova Scotia lifeflight is an air ambulance service that provides critical care transport for patients in Nova Scotia and the neighbouring provinces. It is part of the Emergency Health Services (EHS) system that delivers pre-hospital emergency care in the province.

Nova Scotia lifeflight was established in 1996, but its origins can be traced back to the 1960s when the Canadian Forces’ No. 413 Squadron provided medical air transportation in the Maritimes under the military’s aid to the civil power provisions. The squadron used search and rescue aircraft such as the CH-113 Labrador helicopter and the CC-115 Buffalo and CC-130 Hercules fixed-wing aircraft to transport patients from remote areas or between hospitals

In 1996, the Nova Scotia Department of Health launched the first dedicated air ambulance service in the Maritimes in partnership with CHC Helicopter Corporation and the Shock Trauma Air Rescue Society (STARS). The service was initially called EHS Air Medical Transport and used a Sikorsky S-76A helicopter and a Beechcraft King Air 200 fixed-wing aircraft to provide critical care transport for patients. The service also had specialized teams of paramedics, nurses, and physicians who could provide advanced life support and trauma care.

In 2001, STARS decided not to renew its contract with EHS, citing philosophical differences over management and fundraising. The service was renamed EHS LifeFlight and continued to operate under CHC Helicopter Corporation until 2008, when Emergency Medical Care Inc. (EMC) won the operating contract. EMC is a subsidiary of Medavie Health Services, which also operates ground ambulance services in Nova Scotia under contract for EHS.

In 2007, Transport Canada tightened regulations on flying over densely populated areas. LifeFlight, the only air ambulance service in the province, continued to land on hospital rooftops as safe single engine performance was demonstrated in a simulator. On April 1, 2016, Transport Canada required demonstrated single engine performance from the aircraft manufacturer. From that point on, LifeFlight operated from nearby Point Pleasant Park, a city park with a helipad, from where EHS could transport patients by ground ambulance with a 15-minute drive to the nearest hospital. This continued until the older S76A model was replaced with two newer S-76-C+ helicopters on December 20, 2017. These newer helicopters did adhere to the regulations and allowed them to return to rooftop operations.

In 2017, EHS LifeFlight added a second fixed-wing aircraft, a PAL Aerospace Beechcraft 1900, to provide non-critical care transport for patients from Yarmouth and Sydney to Halifax. The new service reduced the travel time and increased the comfort for patients, as well as freed up ambulances and paramedics for local emergency calls.

From the start of the air ambulance service on May 13, 1996, to December 31, 2003, there were 3,682 LifeFlight missions. Since then, the service has continued to grow and evolve, providing critical care transport for thousands of patients every year. As of 2020, EHS LifeFlight had completed over 15,000 missions.

== Operations ==
LifeFlight operates around the clock, every day of the year, to provide air medical transport for critically ill or injured patients. It has two bases in Halifax: the QEII Health Sciences Centre for adult patients and the IWK Health Centre for pediatric and neonatal patients. LifeFlight’s main function is to transfer patients who need advanced medical treatment from one hospital to another, usually to a major referral hospital or trauma centre in Halifax or Saint John.

LifeFlight has access to 82 helicopter-approved landing zones in Nova Scotia, certified by Transport Canada, as well as additional heliports in Prince Edward Island and New Brunswick. In case of a motor vehicle collision, LifeFlight can also land and take off from the highway if safe and feasible. In rural areas of Nova Scotia, LifeFlight can use volunteer fire departments and Department of Natural Resources depots as landing sites if there is enough rotor clearance.

LifeFlight’s primary mode of air ambulance transport is a Sikorsky S-76-C+ helicopter, owned and operated by Canadian Helicopters Limited. LifeFlight has two of these helicopters, one as a backup, since January 2017, when EHS signed a $105 million 15-year contract with the company. These helicopters are certified by Transport Canada to land on H1 helipads, which are located on hospital rooftops. The only hospitals in the Maritimes with rooftop helipads are the IWK Health Centre, the Queen Elizabeth II Health Sciences Centre, and the Digby General Hospital. LifeFlight’s secondary mode of air ambulance transport is a Beechcraft King Air 200 fixed-wing aircraft, which is used for longer distances or when the helicopter is unavailable.

== Impact and recognition ==
LifeFlight has received several awards and honours for its air medical services, such as:

- The Air Medical Safety Award from the Association of Air Medical Services in 2009 for its outstanding commitment to safety culture and practices.
- The Innovation in Health Care Award from the Canadian College of Health Service Executives in 2010, for developing and implementing the LifeFlight Transport Medicine Program, which provides standardized training and certification for its crew members.
- The Sikorsky Humanitarian Service Award from Sikorsky Aircraft Corporation in 2012, for its remarkable achievements in saving lives and alleviating human suffering through its helicopter missions.
