= Mobile stroke unit =

Ambulance specialized for treating stroke

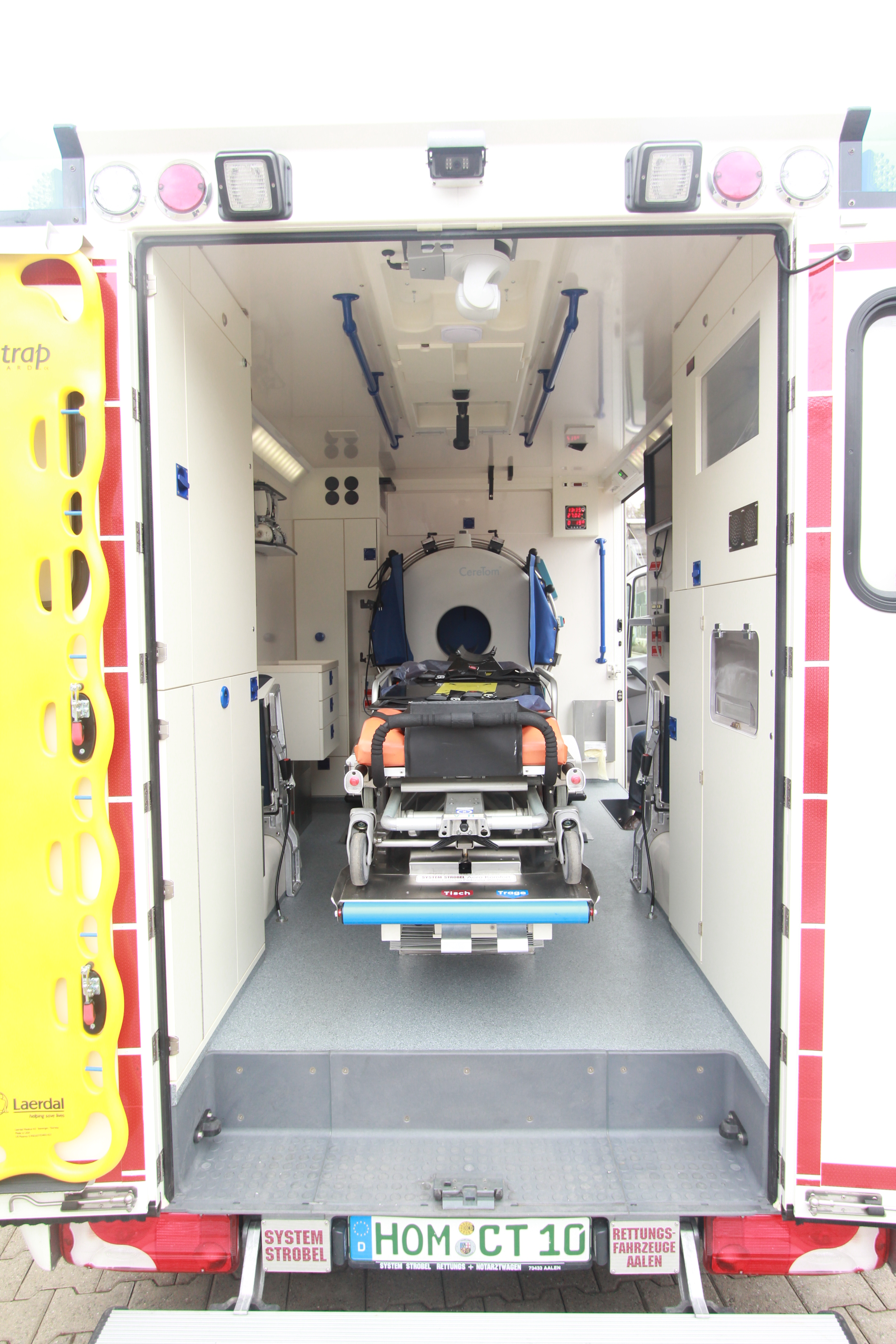
Interior view of ambulance with a mobile CT scanner seen at the center.

A mobile stroke unit (MSU) is an ambulance that furnishes services to diagnose, evaluate, and/or treat symptoms of an acute stroke. It may contain, in addition to the normal ambulance equipment, a device for brain imaging (computerized tomography), a point-of-care laboratory and telemedical interaction between ambulance and hospital (videoconferencing, exchange of videos of patient examination and CT scans). Thus, this specialized ambulance includes all the tools necessary for hyperacute assessment and treatment of stroke patients and diagnosis-based triage directly at the emergency site.

== Purpose ==
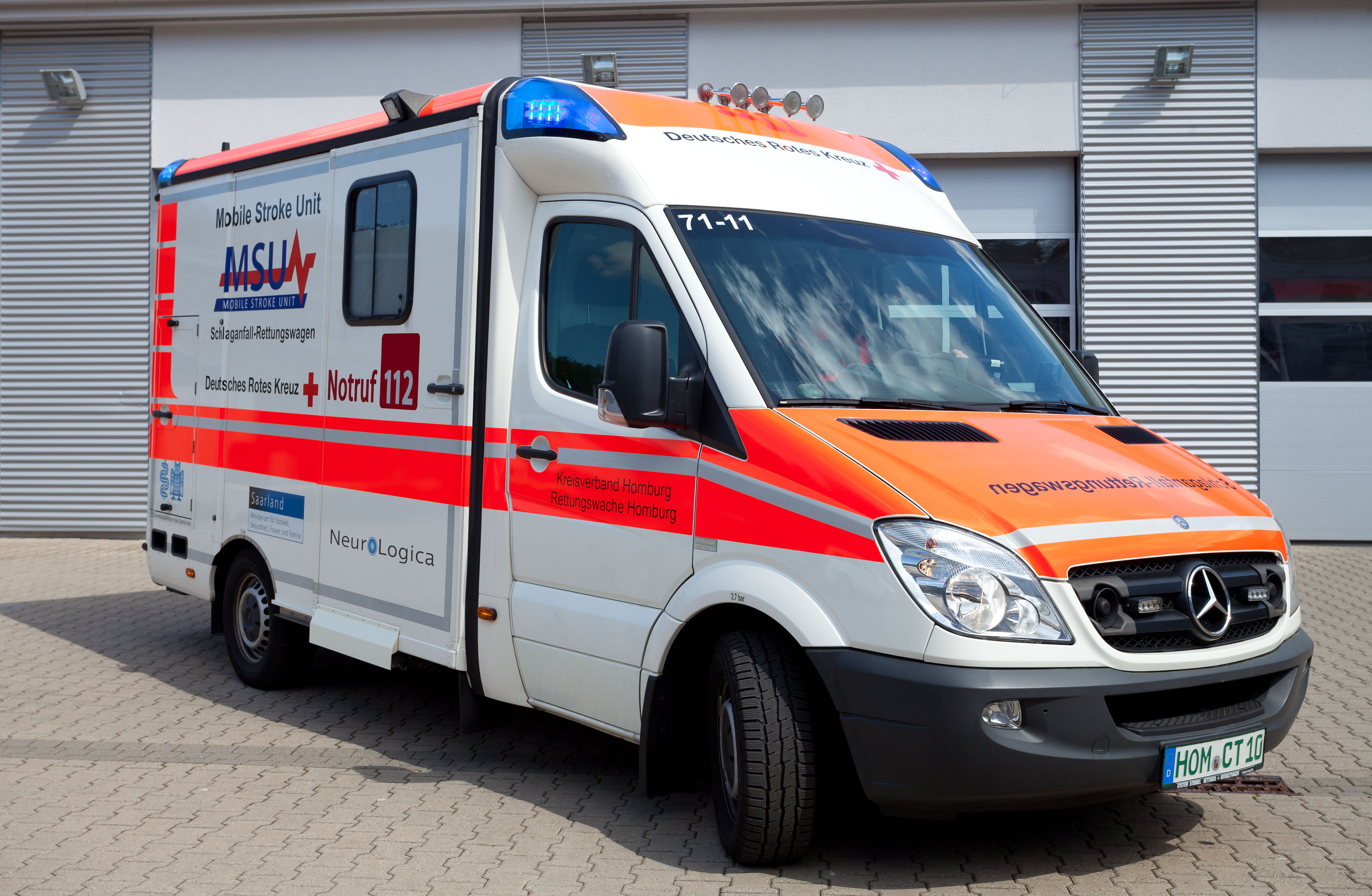
Exterior view of ambulance

According to the 'time-is-brain' concept in acute stroke, recanalization of the obstructed blood vessels has to be performed within the very first hours after symptom onset. However, patients mostly come too late to the hospital and, therefore, only a minority of patients (5–10%) obtains the time-sensitive recanalizing treatments, and if so, mostly too late. As a potential solution to the problem of detrimental delays in stroke management the MSU concept was developed enabling diagnosis and treatment directly at the emergency site as opposed to awaiting the patient's arrival at hospital for treatment. By bringing imaging technology and stroke clinical expertise to the scene, teams are able to take advantage of the pre-hospital arrival time by focusing team efforts solely on one patient with suspected stroke.

Apart from the earlier start of treatment, knowledge about the type of stroke already in the pre-hospital phase of stroke management allows accurate triage decisions in regard to the most appropriate target hospital, e.g., hospital with or without endovascular or neurosurgical treatment options.

== History and current evidence ==
The MSU concept was first published in 2003 and realized in clinical practice in 2008 by Fassbender et al. at Saarland University, Germany, adhering to current guidelines and legislations. It increased treatment rates and improved care of cerebral hemorrhage, when compared to conventional in-hospital care as shown by them and other groups at Berlin, Germany; Houston, Texas, United States; Cleveland, Ohio, United States; New York, New York, United States; or Drøbak and Oslo, Norway. In 2016, more than 20 sites are investigating this concept. In 2021, the preliminary results of the Benefits of Stroke Treatment Delivered Using a Mobile Stroke Unit (BEST-MSU) were published in the New England Journal of Medicine, demonstrating improved disability outcomes for acute stroke patients treated on a MSU compared to standard transport to the Emergency Department by Emergency Medical Services (EMS). Further studies on long-term outcomes, cost-effectiveness and best setting are underway.

Frazer, Ltd. a Houston, Texas–based emergency vehicle builder, designed and built the 1st MSU in the United States in January 2014. Their specialization in on-board generators for EMS vehicles made them the perfect fit to create an emergency vehicle that could handle the needs of a mobile CT scanner. NeuroLogica Corporation, a subsidiary of Samsung Electronics, provides the mCT, CereTom, enabling the ambulance to do critical CT scans to determine the status of the stroke. With input from leading neurologists, Frazer was able to build a functional space on wheels that helps to drastically cut down the time between onset symptoms and treatment.
