= Royal Canadian Air Force =

Air and space component of the Canadian Armed Forces

- Aviation royale canadienne
- Badge
- Founded: 1 April 1924; (102 years, 7 months); (as Royal Canadian Air Force); 17 May 1920; (106 years, 5 months); (as Canadian Air Force (1920–1924)); 1 August 1918; (108 years, 3 months); (as Canadian Air Force (1918–1920)); 1 September 1914; (112 years, 2 months); (as Canadian Aviation Corps)
- Country: Canada
- Type: Air and space force
- Role: Aerial warfare; Space warfare; Airlift
- Size: 390 aircraft (Note: In 2025, only 40 per cent of aircraft were assessed as "serviceable"); Personnel: • 15,553 Regular Force members; • 2,160 Primary Reserve members; • 1,448 civilian personnel
- Part of: Canadian Armed Forces
- Headquarters: National Defence Headquarters, Ottawa, Ontario, Canada
- Motto: Sic itur ad astra (Latin for 'Such is the pathway to the stars')
- March: RCAF March Past
- Anniversaries: Armed Forces Day (first Sunday of June)
- Engagements: Second World War; Korean War; Gulf War; Operation Deliberate Force; Kosovo War; War in Afghanistan; Intervention in Libya; Military intervention against ISIL
- Website: www.canada.ca/en/air-force.html

Commanders
- Commander-in-Chief: Charles III, King of Canada
- Commander of the RCAF: Lieutenant-general Jamie Speiser-Blanchet
- Deputy Commander of the RCAF: Major-General Denis O'Reilly
- RCAF Command CWO: Chief Warrant Officer Renee J. Hansen

Insignia
- Roundel

- Fin flash

- Ensign

Aircraft flown
- Fighter: CF-18 Hornet, F/A-18 Hornet, F-35A
- Helicopter: CH-139 JetRanger, CH-146 Griffon, CH-147 Chinook, CH-148 Cyclone, CH-149 Cormorant
- Patrol: CP-140 Aurora
- Reconnaissance: CE-145C Vigilance
- Trainer: CT-114 Tutor, CT-142 Dash-8, CT-156 Harvard II
- Transport: CC-130J Super Hercules, CC-138 Twin Otter, CC-144 Challenger, CC-150 Polaris, CC-177 Globemaster III, CC-295 Kingfisher, CC-330 Husky

The Royal Canadian Air Force (RCAF; French: Aviation royale canadienne - ARC, lit. 'Canadian royal aviation') is the air and space force of Canada. Its role is to "provide the Canadian Forces with relevant, responsive and effective airpower". The RCAF is one of three environmental commands within the unified Canadian Armed Forces. As of 2020, the Royal Canadian Air Force consists of 12,074 Regular Force and 1,969 Primary Reserve personnel, supported by 1,518 civilians, and operates 258 manned aircraft and nine unmanned aerial vehicles. Appointed in 2025, Lieutenant-General Jamie Speiser-Blanchet is the current Commander of the Royal Canadian Air Force and Chief of the Air Force Staff.

The Royal Canadian Air Force is responsible for all aircraft operations of the Canadian Forces, enforcing the security of Canada's airspace and providing aircraft to support the missions of the Royal Canadian Navy and the Canadian Army. The RCAF is a partner with the United States Air Force in protecting continental airspace under the North American Aerospace Defense Command (NORAD). The RCAF also provides all primary air resources to and is responsible for the National Search and Rescue Program.

The RCAF traces its history to the Canadian Air Force, which was formed in 1920. The Canadian Air Force was granted royal sanction in 1924 by King George V to form the Royal Canadian Air Force. In 1968, the RCAF was amalgamated with the Royal Canadian Navy and the Canadian Army, as part of the unification of the Canadian Forces. Air units were split between several different commands: Air Defence Command (ADC; interceptors), Air Transport Command (ATC; airlift, search and rescue), Mobile Command (tactical fighters, helicopters), Maritime Command (anti-submarine warfare, maritime patrol), as well as Training Command (TC).

In 1975, some commands (ADC, ATC, TC) were dissolved, and all air units were placed under a new environmental command called simply Air Command (AIRCOM; French: Commandement aérien). Air Command reverted to its historic name of "Royal Canadian Air Force" in August 2011.

The Royal Canadian Air Force has served in the Second World War, the Korean War, the Persian Gulf War, as well as several United Nations peacekeeping missions and NATO operations. As a NATO member, the force maintained a presence in Europe during the second half of the 20th century.

== History ==
=== 1920–1945: Pre-unification ===
The Canadian Air Force (CAF) was established in 1920 as the successor to a short-lived two-squadron Canadian Air Force that was formed during the First World War in Europe. Wing Commander John Scott Williams was tasked in 1921 with organizing the CAF, handing command over later the same year to Air Marshal Lindsay Gordon. The new Canadian Air Force was a branch of the Air Board and was chiefly a training militia that provided refresher training to veteran pilots. Many CAF members also worked with the Air Board's Civil Operations Branch on operations that included forestry, surveying and anti-smuggling patrols.

In 1923, the CAF became responsible for all flying operations in Canada, including civil aviation. In 1924, the Canadian Air Force, was granted the royal title, becoming the Royal Canadian Air Force (RCAF). Most of its work was civil in nature, with forest patrols of the northwest a major part of its operations; however, in the late 1920s other agencies took up most civil tasks, with the notable exception of aerial photography surveys, and the RCAF evolved into more of a military organization. After budget cuts in the early 1930s, the air force began to rebuild.

==== Second World War ====
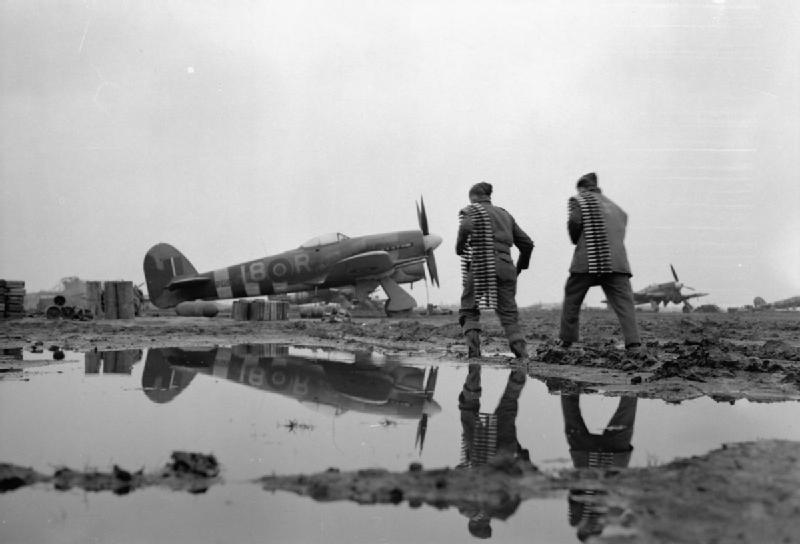
Two armourers of No 440 Squadron RCAF re-arming a Hawker Typhoon in the Netherlands, 1944

During the Second World War, the RCAF was a major contributor to the British Commonwealth Air Training Plan and was involved in operations in the United Kingdom, Europe, the north Atlantic, North Africa, southern Asia, and with home defence. Eight thousand, eight hundred and sixty-four Americans came north to volunteer for the RCAF and over 850 died in action. By the end of the war, the RCAF had become the fourth largest Allied air force. During World War II the RCAF was headquartered at a six-storey office building at 20-23 Lincoln's Inn Fields (built 1937), London. A commemorative plaque can be found on the outside of the building.

==== 1945–1968 ====
After the war, the RCAF reduced its strength. Because of the rising Soviet threat to the security of Europe, Canada joined NATO in 1949, and the RCAF established No. 1 Air Division RCAF consisting of four wings with three fighter squadrons each, based in France and West Germany. In 1950, the RCAF became involved with the transport of troops and supplies to the Korean War; however, it did not provide RCAF combat units. Members of the RCAF served in USAF units as exchange officers and several flew in combat. Both auxiliary and regular air defence squadrons were run by Air Defence Command. At the same time, the Pinetree Line, the Mid-Canada Line and the DEW Line radar stations, largely operated by the RCAF, were built across Canada because of the growing Soviet nuclear threat. In 1957, Canada and the United States created the joint North American Air Defense Command (NORAD). Coastal defence and peacekeeping also became priorities during the 1950s and 1960s.

=== 1968–present: Unification ===
In 1968, the Royal Canadian Navy, Royal Canadian Air Force and Canadian Army were amalgamated to form the unified Canadian Forces. This initiative was overseen by the Defence Minister, Paul Hellyer. The controversial merger maintained several existing organizations and created some new ones: In Europe, No. 1 Canadian Air Group, operated Canadair CF-104 Starfighter nuclear strike/attack and reconnaissance under NATO's Fourth Allied Tactical Air Force; Air Defence Command: operated McDonnell CF-101 Voodoo interceptors, CIM-10 Bomarc missiles and the SAGE radar stations within NORAD; Air Transport Command: provided strategic airlift for the NATO and UN peacekeeping missions; and Training Command. Aviation assets of the Royal Canadian Navy were combined with the RCAF Canadair CP-107 Argus long-range patrol aircraft under Maritime Command. In 1975, the different commands, and the scattered aviation assets, were consolidated under Air Command (AIRCOM).

In the early 1990s, Canada provided a detachment of CF-18 Hornets for the air defence mission in Operation Desert Shield. The force performed combat air patrols over operations in Kuwait and Iraq, undertook a number of air-to-ground bombing missions, and, on one occasion, attacked an Iraqi patrol boat in the Persian Gulf.

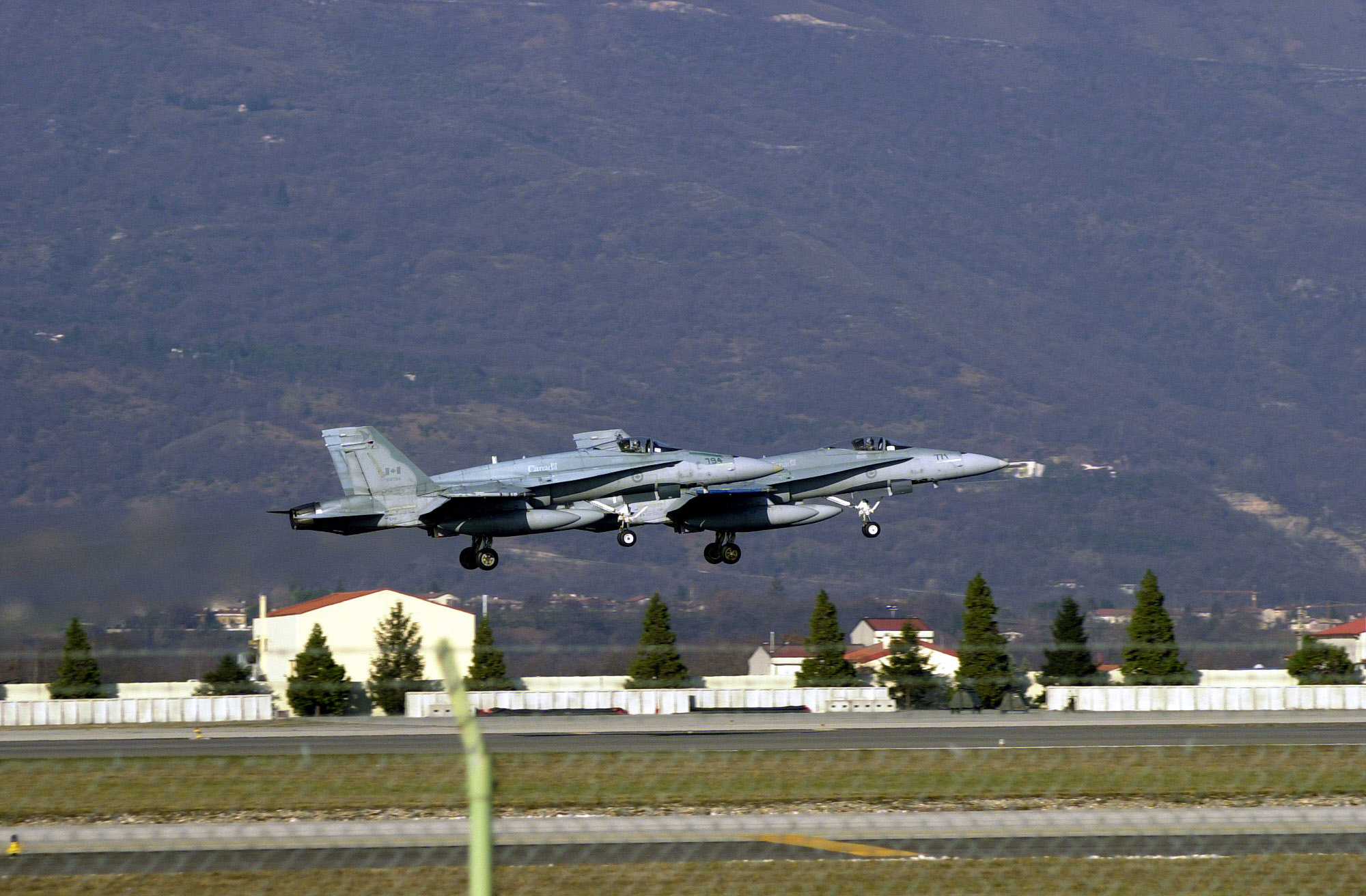
Two CF-18s with Operation Echo depart Aviano Air Base in Italy in 2000, in support of the NATO bombing of Yugoslavia.

In the late 1990s, Air Command's CF-18 Hornets took part in the Operation Allied Force in Yugoslavia, and in the 2000s, AIRCOM was heavily involved in the Afghanistan War, transporting troops and assets to Kandahar. Later in the decade-long war, AIRCOM set up a purpose-specific air wing, Joint Task Force Afghanistan Air Wing, equipped with several CH-146 Griffon and CH-147 Chinook helicopters, CC-130 Hercules, CU-161 Sperwer and leased CU-170 Heron UAVs in support of the Canadian Forces and ISAF mission. The wing stood down on 18 August 2011.

From 18 March to 1 November 2011, the RCAF was engaged in Operation Mobile, Canada's contribution to Operation Unified Protector in Libya. Seven CF-18 Hornet fighter aircraft and several other aircraft served under Task Force Libeccio as part of the military intervention.

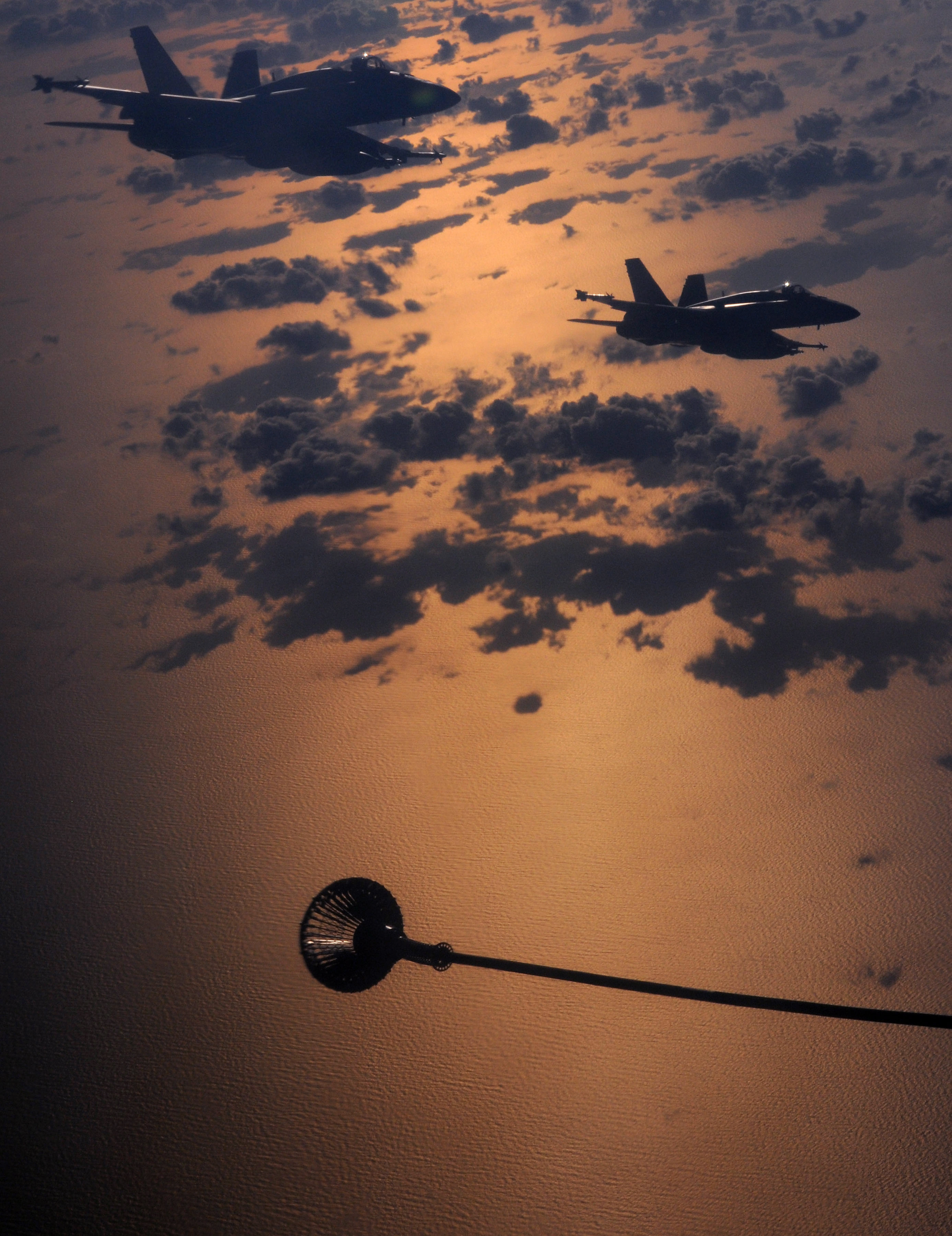
RCAF CF-18 Hornets refuelling during the First Libyan Civil War.

On 16 August 2011, the Government of Canada announced that the name "Air Command" was being changed to the air force's original historic name: Royal Canadian Air Force (along with the change of name of Maritime Command to Royal Canadian Navy and Land Force Command to Canadian Army). The change was made to better reflect Canada's military heritage and align Canada with other key Commonwealth countries whose military units use the royal designation. The RCAF adopted a new badge in 2013, which is similar to the pre-unification RCAF badge (although placed in the modern frame used for command badges). The Latin motto of Air Command – Sic itur ad astra – which was the motto of the Canadian Air Force when first formed after the First World War (before it became the Royal Canadian Air Force in 1924) was retained. Though traditional insignia for the RCAF was restored in 2015, there has been no restoration of the traditional uniforms or rank structure of the historical service (apart from a rank of "aviator", which replaced that of "private" in 2015).

On 17 April 2014, Prime Minister Stephen Harper announced that Canada was dispatching six CF-18s and military personnel to assist NATO in operations in Eastern Europe.

== Structure ==
The Royal Canadian Air Force is the air and space force component of the Canadian Armed Forces, led by the commander of the Royal Canadian Air Force. The commander, typically a lieutenant general, is based at RCAF Headquarters in Ottawa. In addition to the commander, RCAF Headquarters also includes the deputy commander, typically a major-general, and the Chief Warrant Officer of the Air Force. The commander of the RCAF reports to the chief of Defence Staff, who, in turn, reports to the minister of National Defence, the head of the Department of National Defence.

The RCAF has four major formations responsible to the commander of the RCAF. They include 1 Canadian Air Division, 2 Canadian Air Division, 3 Canadian Space Division, and the RCAF Aerospace Warface Centre. There are 15 wings spread across the three divisions, with most wings typically including flying and non-flying squadrons.

=== 1 Canadian Air Division ===
1 Canadian Air Division, based in Winnipeg, is the operational headquarters of the RCAF, responsible for maintaining readiness and providing air power and personnel for rapid deployment on domestic and international operations. The commander of the division also serves as commander of the Canadian NORAD Region, Joint Force Air Component commander, and commander of Search and Rescue Region Trenton.

It oversees 11 wings across Canada, encompassing fighter, tactical aviation, maritime aviation, air mobility, search and rescue, and surveillance capabilities. Also reporting to the division's commander are the Combined Aerospace Operations Centre and the Aerospace and Telecommunications Engineering Support Squadron.

=== 2 Canadian Air Division ===
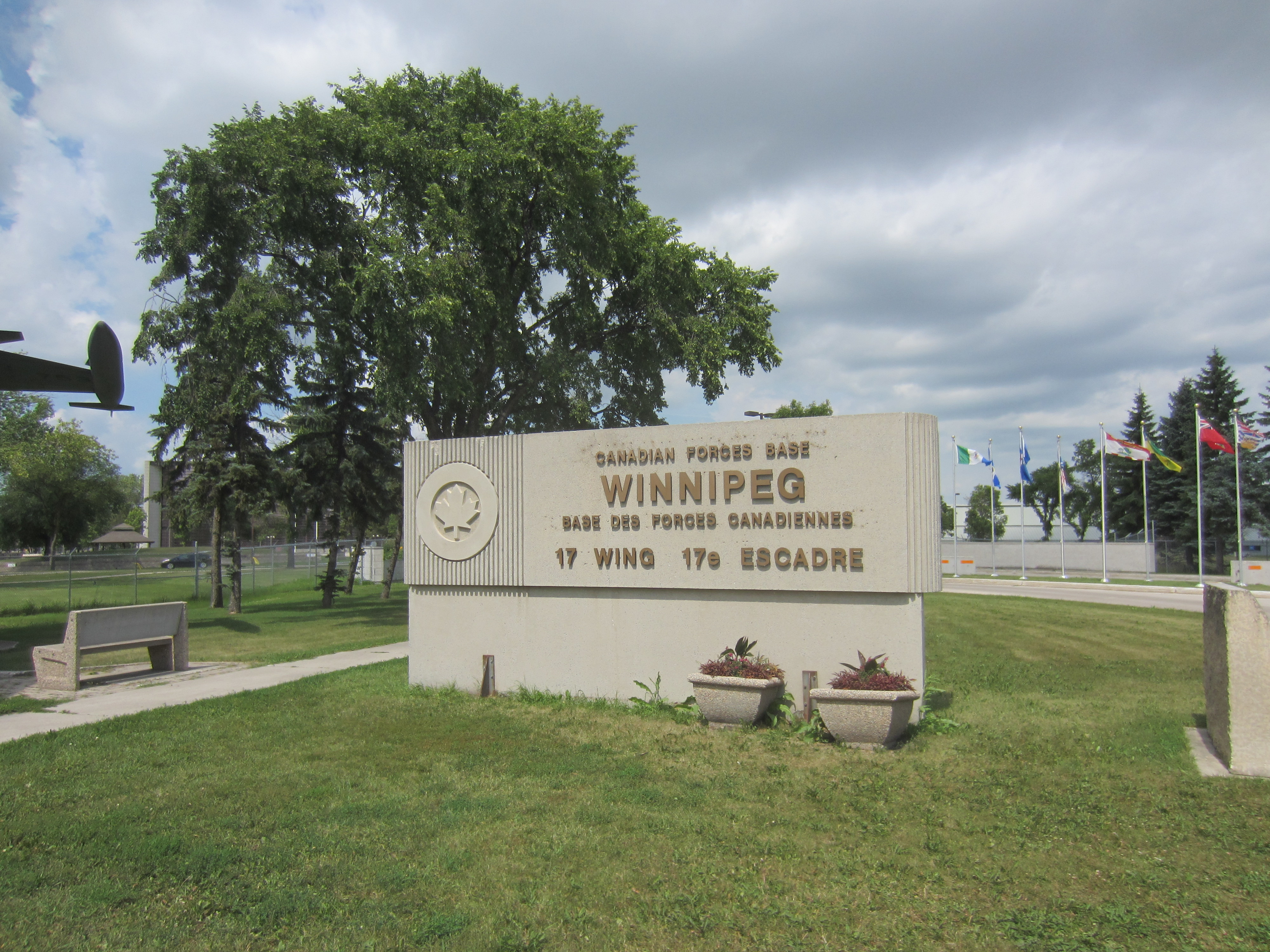
Entry sign for 17 Wing at CFB Winnipeg, which hosts 2 Canadian Air Division headquarters

2 Canadian Air Division, based in Winnipeg, is the formation responsible for training and education and ensures continuity throughout the RCAF training continuum. As the delegated training authority, it oversees individual education and training, core developmental courses, and broader RCAF training management.

Three wings report to the 2 Canadian Air Division, 15 Wing Moose Jaw, 16 Wing Borden, and 17 Wing Winnipeg. The Canadian Forces Aircrew Selection Centre also reports to the division's commander.

=== 3 Canadian Space Division ===
3 Canadian Space Division, based in Ottawa, delivers space power effects in support of CAF operations and reports to RCAF Headquarters, with the RCAF serving as the authority for the DND/CAF Joint and Combined Space Program. The division's four prioritized mission areas are satellite communication and navigation, space domain awareness, space-based intelligence, surveillance and reconnaissance, and space control. The commander of the division also serves as Joint Force Space Component Commander and oversees space domain awareness, space-based support to military operations, and the protection of military space capabilities. The division includes one wing, 7 Wing (Space), itself comprising two squadrons.

=== RCAF Aerospace Warfare Centre ===
The RCAF Aerospace Warfare Centre in Trenton, Ontario, is the RCAF's centre of excellence for advancing techniques, technology, innovation, and concepts in air and space power. It supports the development of doctrine, professional education, operational test and evaluation, and electronic warfare. The centre also serves as the steward of RCAF history and heritage.

Units and organizations under the RCAF Aerospace Warfare Centre include 414 Electronic Warfare Support Squadron, 434 Operational Test and Evaluation Squadron, the Air and Space Power Development Centre, the Centre for Operational Research and Analysis, and RCAF History and Heritage. These units and organizations provide electronic warfare support and training, coordinate operational testing and evaluation, develop air and space power knowledge and education, conduct qualitative and quantitative research, and preserve and integrate RCAF history and heritage into its programs and practices.

== Aircraft fleets ==
As of 2026, the Royal Canadian Air Force has over 300 aircraft in its inventory. However, an internal Department of National Defence military readiness report published in early 2025 noted that only about 40 per cent of aircraft could be considered "serviceable". Another report by the Auditor General of Canada in 2025 found that one of the RCAF's biggest obstacles was a shortage of both trained fighter pilots and aircraft maintenance technicians. RCAF aircraft originate from domestic manufacturers and manufacturers based in other NATO member states, including the US, France, Switzerland, Germany, Spain, and Italy.

Each RCAF aircraft fleet is assigned a unique alphanumeric designation consisting of the prefix "C", a letter indicating the aircraft's primary role, and a three-digit numerical code. The role designators include electronic support (E), fighter (F), helicopter (H), patrol (P), trainer (T), transport (C), and unmanned (U).

=== Electronic support ===
The RCAF ordered three CE-145C Vigilance aircraft, a Beechcraft King Air 350ER twin-turboprop aircraft modified by L3Harris with advanced sensors and secure communications equipment under the Manned Airborne Intelligence, Surveillance and Reconnaissance project. The aircraft are used to support Canadian Special Operations Forces Command, providing enhanced situational awareness and supporting decision-making during Canadian Armed Forces operations. All three CF-145C were delivered in 2024 to 8 Wing Trenton.

In 2026, the Saab GlobalEye system mounted on a Bombardier Global 6500 was selected as the RCAF's airborne early warning and control platform, with negotiations to acquire five or six aircraft underway.

=== Fighter ===
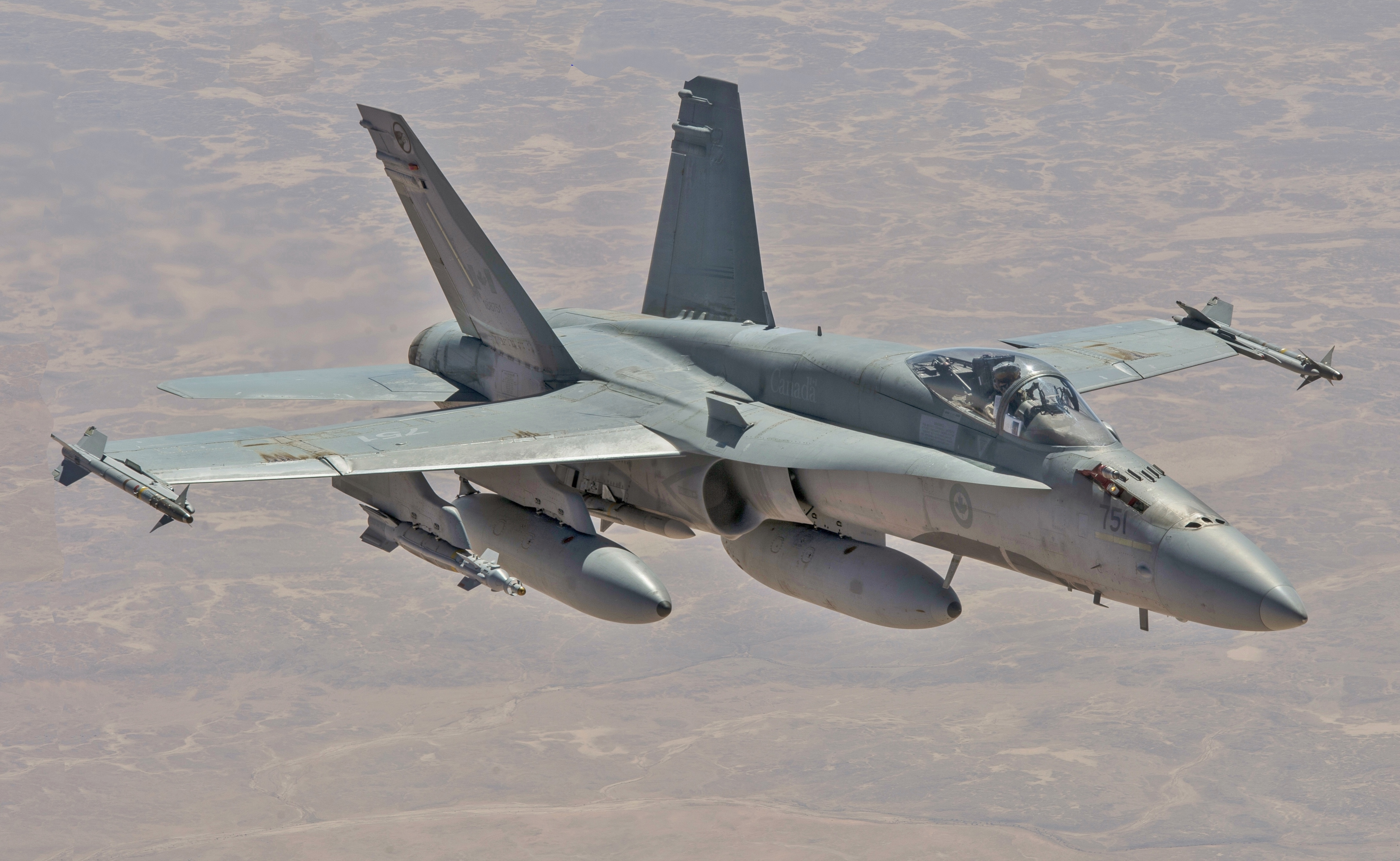
A CF-188A Hornet in flight

The RCAF's primary fighter is the CF-188 Hornet, a variant of the F/A-18 Hornet multi-role fighter. The RCAF primarily uses the Hornet for air defence, air superiority, ground attack, tactical support, training, aerospace testing and evaluation, and for aerobatic demonstrations. The aircraft operate from 3 Wing Bagotville and 4 Wing Cold Lake. The Hornet entered service with the RCAF in 1982, with 138 aircraft delivered, comprising 98 single-seat CF-188A and 40 two-seat CF-188B variants. However, the number of CF-188s in service has declined over the years, with 72 CF-188As and 31 CF-188Bs remaining in the inventory, and only 85 CF-188s in service as of 2025.

To supplement the CF-188 fleet, the RCAF purchased 18 used F/A-18 Hornets from Australia in 2018, with an additional seven to use for spare parts. The RCAF received the final F/A-18 in 2021.

In 2023, an agreement was signed for the acquisition of 88 Lockheed Martin F-35A Lightning II fighters to replace the CF-188 fleet, with the first two aircraft delivered in 2026.

=== Helicopter ===
==== Tactical ====
A CH-147F Chinook in flight

The CH-147F Chinook is an advanced, multi-mission helicopter operated by the RCAF for transporting personnel and equipment during domestic and deployed operations. It supports the Canadian Army, special operations forces, government departments, law enforcement agencies, and civil authorities, and features enhanced self-protection systems, including anti-missile, radar and laser warning, ballistic protection, and self-defence machine guns. The aircraft are operated by 450 Tactical Helicopter Squadron and are based in Garrison Petawawa, a Canadian Army base. The RCAF acquired 15 Chinooks, with the first one delivered in 2013. As of 2025, 14 remain in service, after one Chinook crashed in 2023.

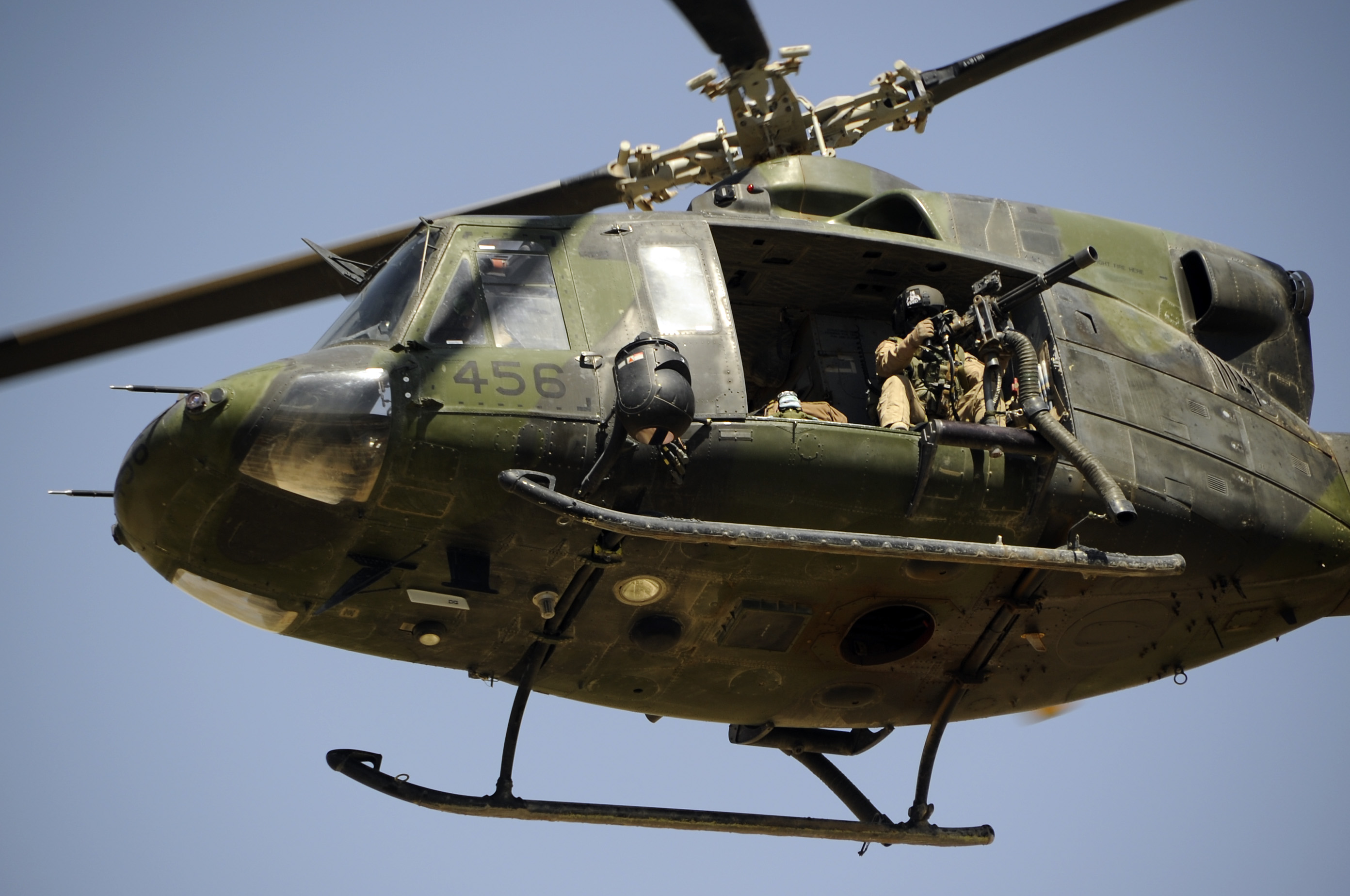
A CH-146 Griffon with a M134D minigun mounted on it

The CH-146 Griffon is a utility tactical-transport helicopter used for transporting troops and materiel, as well as search and rescue, surveillance and reconnaissance, training, casualty evacuation, and counter-drug operations. It can be equipped with self-defence weapons, a searchlight, and a hoist for extracting personnel and cargo. As of 2024, the RCAF has 85 Griffons in service, spread across ten wings.

==== Other helicopters ====
The CH-148 Cyclone is the Canadian Armed Forces main ship-borne maritime helicopter, and are operated by the RCAF to provide air support to the Royal Canadian Navy. It conducts surface and sub-surface surveillance, search and rescue, tactical transport, and other missions, operating day or night and in most weather conditions in Canada and abroad. The CH-148 fleet was ordered in 2009, with the first of 28 Cyclones delivered in 2015. However, there remain only 27 in service after one helicopter was lost in an accident in 2020.

A CH-149 Cormorant and a diver at a search and rescue demonstration

The CH-149 Cormorant is a long-range search-and-rescue helicopter capable of operating in severe conditions. It can carry up to three stretchers in the SAR configuration, 12 in the casualty-evacuation configuration, or a 5,000-kilogram load, while its advanced systems provide a stable hover for hoisting operations. The Cormorant fleet operates from 9 Wing Gander, 14 Wing Greenwood, and 19 Wing Comox. Entering service in 2001, the RCAF has 13 Cormorants in service as of 2023. An additional three Cormorants were ordered in 2023.

=== Patrol ===
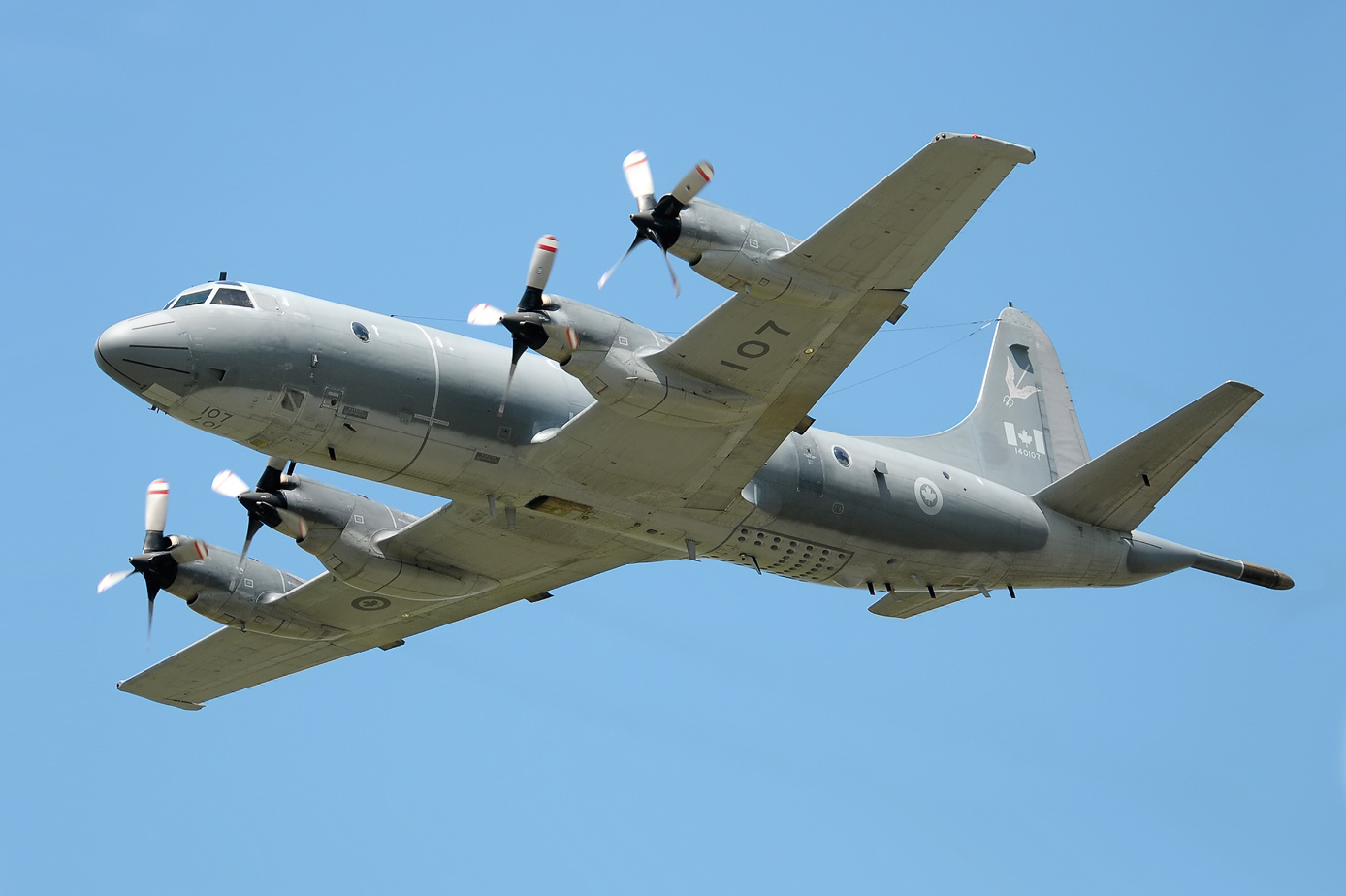
A CP-140 Aurora in flight

The RCAF operates ten CP-140 Aurora long-range patrol and surveillance aircraft, using it for a wide range of missions over land and water. Its roles include intelligence, surveillance and reconnaissance, anti-submarine and anti-surface warfare, strike coordination, search and rescue, and support to other government agencies in combating activities such as illegal fishing, pollution, and drug trafficking. The aircraft operate from 14 Wing Greenwood and 19 Wing Comox. The CP-140 fleet was acquired in 1980, with 18 aircraft initially purchased. As of 2025, 14 remain in service after undergoing life-extension refits during the 2010s.

In 2024, 14 Boeing P-8 Poseidons were ordered to replace the RCAF's CP-140 fleet, with deliveries expected to take place in 2027.

=== Trainer ===
==== RCAF-owned trainers ====
In 2024, the Future Aircrew Training (FAcT) program was announced to replace the contracted training programs set to expire in the late 2020s. As part of the program, the RCAF would acquire new aircraft for the training programs and then lease them to SkyAlyne, a consortium comprising CAE Inc. and KF Defence Programs, that was contracted to provide the training at Southport Aerospace Centre and NATO Flying Training in Canada (NFTC) until 2049.

Aircraft acquired as part of the Future Aircrew Training (FAcT) program include 23 Grob G120 TP, 19 Pilatus PC-21, seven Beechcraft Super King Air 260, three De Havilland Canada Dash 8-400, and 19 Airbus H135. The Grob G120 TP, designated the CT-102B Astra II, will be used for basic flight training; the Pilatus PC-21, designated the CT-157 Siskin II, for advanced fixed-wing training; the King Air 260, designated the CT-145E Expeditor II, for multi-engine training; the Dash 8-400, designated the CT-142Q Citadel, for combat systems and sensor training; and the H135, designated the CT-153 Juno, for advanced rotary-wing training.

CT-114 Tutors in formation during an aerobatic demonstration

A fleet of CT-114 Tutors is operated by the RCAF's 431 Air Demonstration Squadron, better known as the Snowbirds, based at 15 Wing Moose Jaw, for aerobatic demonstrations. The CT-114 also served as the RCAF's primary jet trainer from 1961 until 2000, when it was retired from the training fleet. The type was also operated by the RCAF's Aerospace Engineering Test Establishment until 2020, when its Tutors were placed in storage. The Snowbirds' remaining fleet of 18 Tutors is scheduled to be retired in November 2026.

==== Non-RCAF-owned trainers ====
Since 1992, aspects of aircrew training for the Canadian Armed Forces have been carried out by civilian contractors. From 1992 through the 2020s, aircraft used by civilian contractors to train RCAF pilots were either owned by the contractors or by other federal entities, rather than directly by the RCAF. These aircraft will eventually be retired from use for RCAF training, replaced by aircraft purchased for the FAcT program.

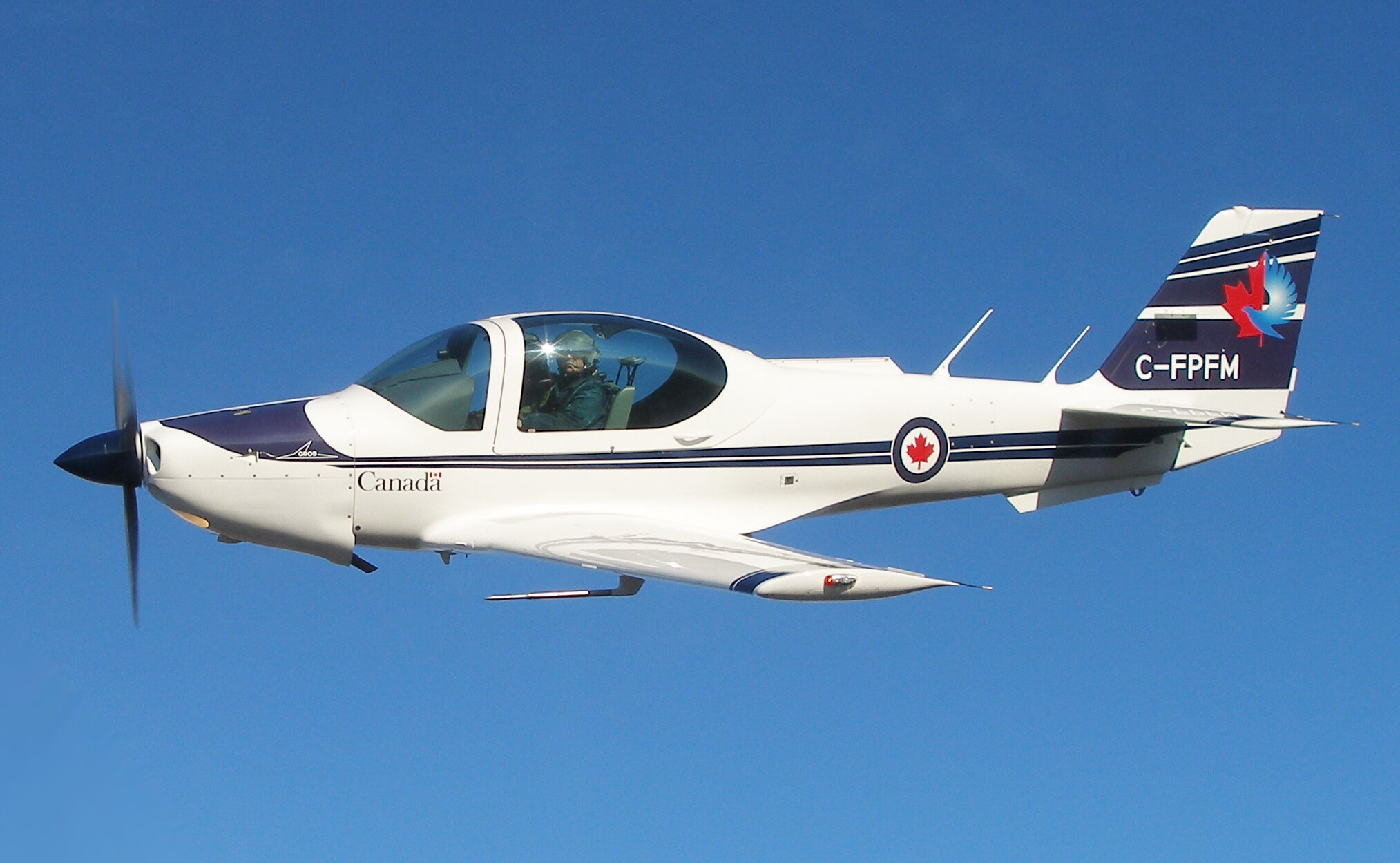
A Grob G120A in flight

The Contracted Flying Training Program was launched to find a civilian contractor to provide RCAF pilots with primary, basic, advanced multi-engine, and helicopter pilot training from Southport Aerospace Centre at 15 Wing Moose Jaw. The Allied Wings consortium was awarded the contract in 2005, and was responsible for maintaining the program until 2027. As a part of the program, the consortium was also responsible for providing training aircraft, including 11 Grob G120A for single-engine aircraft training, and the seven Beechcraft King Air C90B for multi-engine aircraft training. Allied Wings also uses 13 CH-139 Jet Ranger and nine Bell 412CF helicopters taken from the Canadian Armed Forces inventory and converted for use for Allied Wings to provide helicopter training.

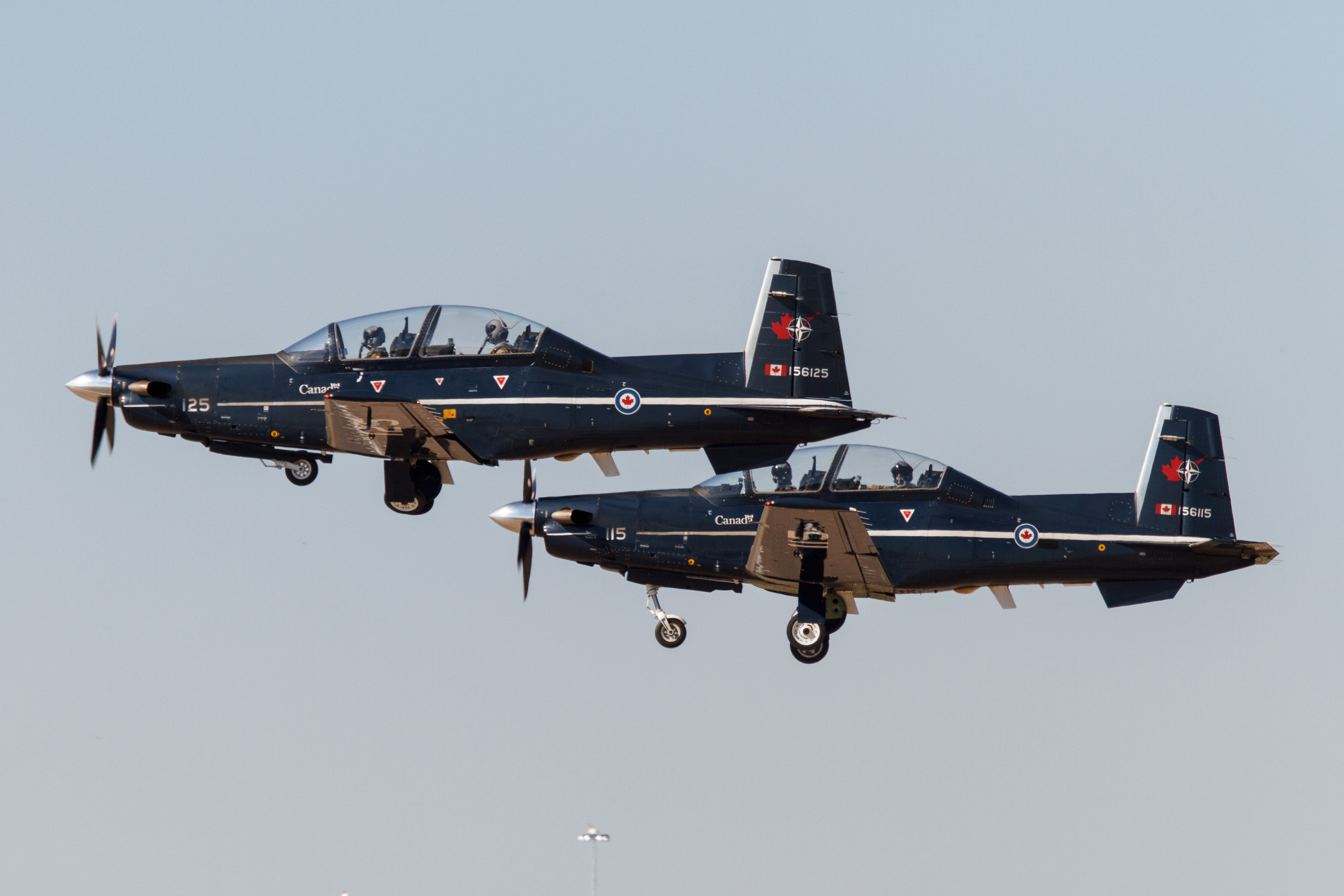
Two CT-156 Harvard IIs in flight

Trainer aircraft used to train RCAF pilots in basic, advanced, and lead-in fighter training at NFTC at 15 Wing Moose Jaw and 4 Wing Cold Lake are also formally owned by Milit-Air, a not-for-profit federal corporation established to own the NFTC and acquire its aircraft and other assets separately from the federal government. Aircraft used at NFTC are then leased to CAE Inc., who is contrated to operate the NFTC program until 2028. As of 2017, the NFTC training fleet included 25 Beechcraft T-6 Texan II, designated the CT-156 Harvard II, and 16 BAE Systems Hawk aircraft, designated the CT-155 Hawk. In 2024, however, the CT-155s were retired from the training fleet, with 15 Hawks transferred to the Canadian Forces School of Aerospace Technology and Engineering for use in maintenance training.

=== Transport ===
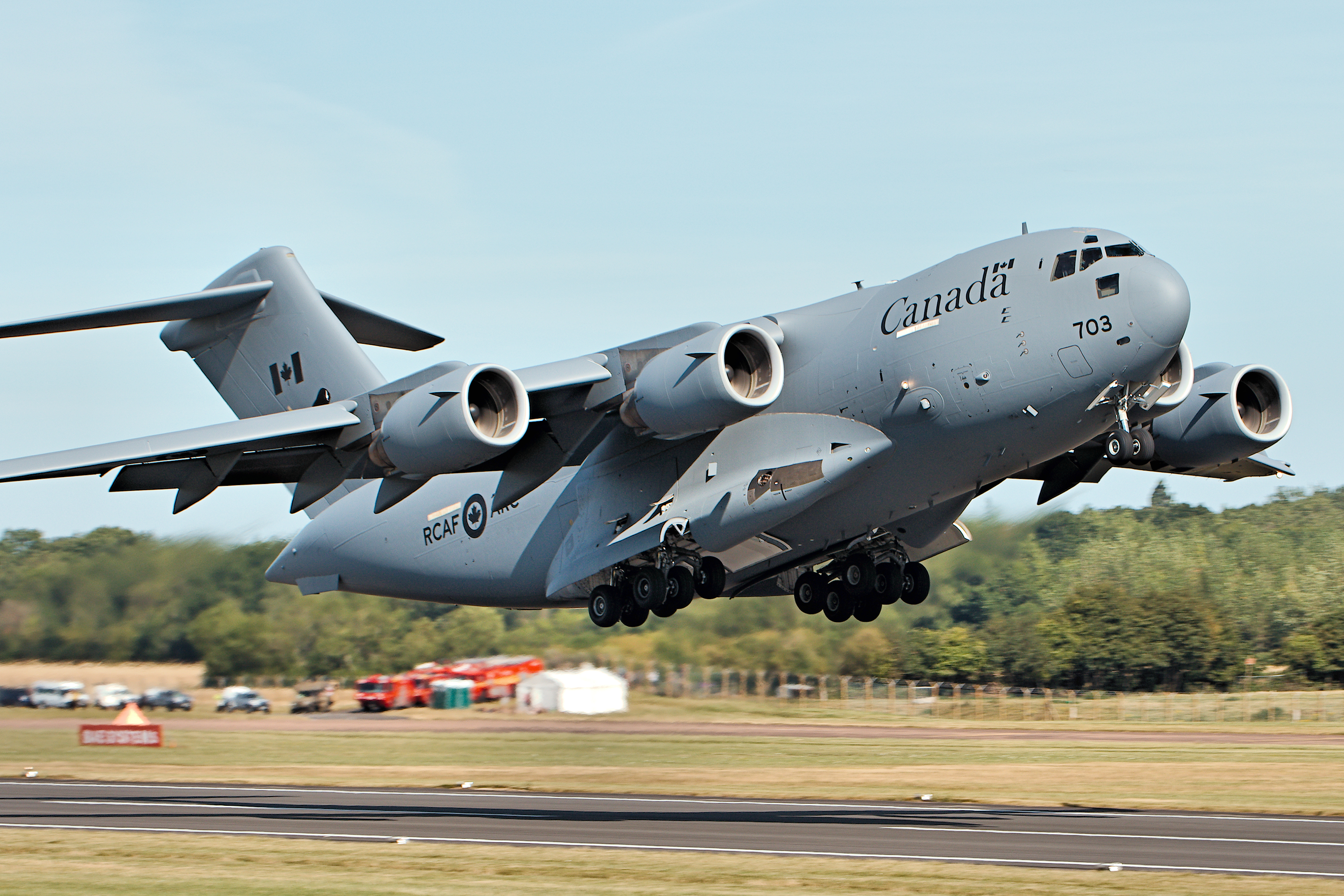
A CC-177 Globemaster III taking off

The RCAF operates five CC-177 Globemaster III strategic airlifters, delivered between 2007 and 2015. They are used to transport troops, cargo, and oversized equipment, such as tanks and helicopters, over continental distances. The RCAF operates 17 CC-130J Hercules aircraft, acquired between 2010 and 2012, for tactical airlift missions. They are used for a variety of roles, including troop transport and search and rescue. Both aircraft fleets are based at 8 Wing Trenton.

A CC-150 Polaris providing aerial refuelling to two CF-188 Hornets

The RCAF ordered nine CC-330 Husky aircraft, a multi-purpose, long-range transport aircraft, with the first three units delivered later that year. The Husky is used to carry passengers, freight, and medical patients and can also be configured for aerial refuelling, capable of ferrying six CF-188s across the Atlantic Ocean. Eight CC-330s are configured for troop and cargo transport and aerial refuelling, while one is configured as an RCAF VIP aircraft for transporting Canadian and foreign dignitaries. The CC-330 is intended to replace the fleet of five CC-150 Polaris aircraft, which were acquired by the Canadian Armed Forces in the 1990s for a similar role and are planned to remain in service until the 2030s, when all nine CC-330s are expected to be operational.

Smaller transport aircraft operated by the RCAF include four CC-138 Twin Otter aircraft as of 2023 and four CC-144 Challenger aircraft as of 2025. The Twin Otter fleet is based in Yellowknife and performs transport and support roles in northern Canada, while the Challenger fleet is based in Ottawa and is used to transport dignitaries and support military operations. In 2025, it was announced six Bombardier Global 6500 would be acquired to replace the Challenger fleet.

A CC-295 Kingfisher taking off

The RCAF's fixed-wing search and rescue aircraft also carry the CC designation, including the CC-295 Kingfisher, which is specifically configured to perform search and rescue missions and locate persons or objects. Kingfishers are planned to be based at 8 Wing Trenton, 14 Wing Greenwood, 17 Wing Winnipeg, and 19 Wing Comox. The RCAF acquired 16 Kingfishers, wih 10 delivered as of 2025.

=== Unmanned ===
The acquisition of 11 General Atomics MQ-9 Reaper was announced by the RCAF in 2024. The remotely piloted aircraft system is planned to provide surveillance, strike, and reconnaissance capabilities, and are primarily intended to be used to patrol the Canadian Arctic. The first aircraft is expected to enter service in 2028, with the full fleet expected to be in service by 2033. The aircraft system was designated CQ-9B Guardian by the RCAF, deviating from the Canadian Armed Forces' established CU designation for unmanned aircraft, as well as its customary three-digit numerical designation.

== Bases and facilities ==
RCAF bases and stations

Ten Canadian Forces bases are used primarily by the RCAF. They include CFB Bagotville in Quebec, CFB Cold Lake in Alberta, CFB Comox in British Columbia, CFB Gander and CFB Goose Bay in Newfoundland and Labrador, CFB Greenwood in Nova Scotia, CFB Moose Jaw in Saskatchewan, CFB North Bay and CFB Trenton in Ontario, and CFB Winnipeg in Winnipeg.

In addition to its ten bases, the RCAF also operate out of several other facilities. This includes Shearwater Heliport and CFS Alert. The former is a heliport in Halifax that is used by 12 Wing Shearwater and its units to provide maritime helicopter support for the Royal Canadian Navy. The latter is a Canadian Forces station with signal intelligence facilities under the command of the RCAF. The station is also used to maintain geolocation capability and support search and rescue operations.

== Personnel ==
As of September 2023, the Royal Canadian Air Force included 15,553 Regular Force members and 2,160 Primary Reserve members. In addition to RCAF personnel, there are also 1,448 Department of National Defence public service employees that support the RCAF as of 2025.

=== Rank and insignia ===
Military ranks in the RCAF denote an individual's position within the command's hierarchy. Advancement through the ranks corresponds to increased responsibility and authority. The rank structure is used to facilitate the transmission of orders during operations, ensure clarity of command, and maintain discipline and order.

The RCAF's rank structure has evolved over the decades to reflect changing roles and operational requirements. From 1924 to 1968, it used ranks such as Wing Commander, Squadron Leader, and Flight Lieutenant. However, a 1965 report noted that these ranks no longer accurately reflected the commands held by personnel and recommended adopting the Army's rank structure to address these discrepancies. Following the unification of the Canadian Armed Forces, the RCAF largely adopted this Army-based structure. The modern RCAF rank structure was introduced in 2014, with the redesignation of its lowest ranks as Aviator, chosen because it is nearly identical in French, reflects the rank's historical French designation, and retains a gender-neutral wording. However, the Army-rank structure was largely retained, in part because of its compatibility with NATO rank systems.

==== Commander-in-Chief ====
Board

Sleeve

Commander-in-Chief board and sleeve used by the governor general of Canada when wearing an air force uniform.

In their capacity as the commander-in-chief of the Canadian Armed Forces, the governor general of Canada exercises several ceremonial military duties, and is entitled to wear a distinctive general officer uniform from any of three environmental commands, the navy, army, or air force. The air force uniform features a unique sleeve braid embellished with the governor general's badge. The badge is also embroidered on the uniform's shoulder straps.

==== Officers ====
RCAF officers hold positions of command and responsibility. Their roles typically include overseeing personnel, planning, and directing operations, making decisions within their scope of authority, and providing advice to achieve operational objectives.

RCAF officers are commissioned through multiple entry plans that are tailored for officer candidates with different educational backgrounds and military experience, to develop them to the proficiency expected of an officer. This typically includes providing pathways to complete an academic degree, either through a Canadian military college or another Canadian university. Other pathways include the Direct Entry Officer Plan for candidates who already possess an academic degree, and the Continuing Education Officer Training Plan for select candidates who are otherwise qualified for service as officers but lack an academic degree. There are also several entry plans to facilitate the transition of non-commissioned members.

All RCAF officer candidates seeking entry into the CAF are required to pass Basic Military Officer Qualification at Canadian Forces Leadership and Recruit School in Saint-Jean-sur-Richelieu.

The rank insignia for senior and junior officers is made up of pearl-grey braid edged in black, with the number and spacing of the laces varying by rank. The rank insignia for subordinate officers is made up of only a singular pearl-grey braid. Historically, officers rank insignias were coloured blue. However, the colour was changed in 2014 to match non-commissioned RCAF members and convey a "one team" emphasis. The rank insignia worn on the shoulder straps of RCAF general officers, like those of other Canadian Armed Forces general and flag officers, features maple leaves, the number of which corresponds to the officer's rank.

NATO code	OF-10	OF-9	OF-8	OF-7	OF-6	OF-5	OF-4	OF-3	OF-2	OF-1
Royal Canadian Air Force
Royal Canadian Air Force		General	Lieutenant-general	Major-general	Brigadier-general	Colonel	Lieutenant-colonel	Major	Captain	Lieutenant	Second lieutenant
Royal Canadian Air Force		Général(e)	Lieutenant(e)-général(e)	Major(e)-général(e)	Brigadier(ère)-général(e)	Colonel(le)	Lieutenant(e)-colonel(le)	Major(e)	Capitaine	Lieutenant(e)	Sous-lieutenant(e)

==== Non-commissioned members ====
Non-commissioned members in the RCAF perform operational and support duties and contribute to maintaining safety, discipline, and the welfare of their units. Non-commissioned members of the RCAF typically enter the service through Basic Military Qualification (BMQ) at Canadian Forces Leadership and Recruit School, followed by air force environmental and occupation-specific training for their chosen trade.

Non-commissioned RCAF members' rank insignia are coloured pearl-grey. The insignia for Aviator uses a single propeller. Rank insignia for junior non-commissioned officer (NCO) and enlisted ranks, except Aviator, feature a chevron, while junior NCO insignia also incorporate a maple leaf. Senior NCO insignia feature St Edward's Crown, with chief warrant officer insignia incorporating the coat of arms of Canada. From 1968 to 2014, the command’s lowest rank was represented by a single chevron. In 2014, this was replaced with a pearl-grey propeller, restoring the RCAF's historical insignia for its lowest rank.

NATO code	OR-9	OR-8	OR-7	OR-6	OR-5	OR-4	OR-3	OR-2	OR-1
Royal Canadian Air Force									No insignia
Royal Canadian Air Force	Chief warrant officer	Master warrant officer	Warrant officer	Sergeant		Master corporal	Corporal	Aviator (trained)	Aviator (basic)
Royal Canadian Air Force	Adjudant(e)-chef	Adjudant(e)-maître	Adjudant(e)	Sergent(e)		Caporal(e)-chef	Caporal(e)	Aviateur (formé)/ Aviatrice (formée)	Aviateur (confirmé)/ Aviatrice (confirmée)

=== Uniforms ===
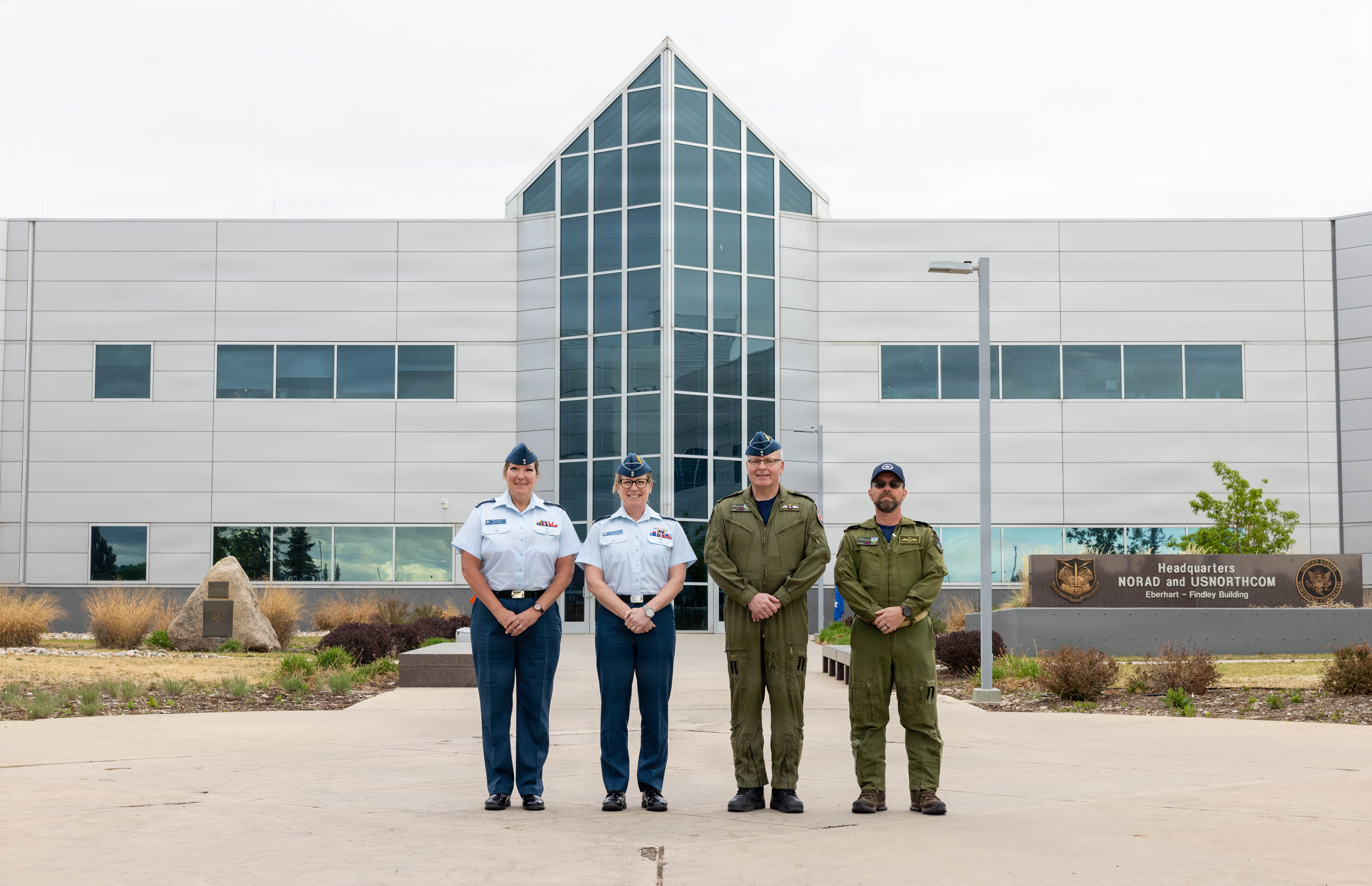
Two RCAF members in service dress (left) next to two RCAF members in operational aviation dress.

All CAF uniforms, including the RCAF, are categorized into five types, including No. 1 Dress (ceremonial dress), No. 2 Dress (mess dress), No. 3 Dress (service dress), No. 4 Dress (occupational dress), and No. 5 Dress (operational dress). Each category contains several orders that specify variations for particular occasions.

RCAF uniforms are regulated by the Dress Instructions for the Canadian Forces. Misuse of the likeness of RCAF's uniforms is an offence under Article 419 of the Criminal Code of Canada and is punishable by summary conviction.

==== Daily duty and operational ====
The RCAF's No. 3 service dress is an environmentally coloured uniform used for daily routine, parades and ceremonies. The pattern includes service-dress jackets and trousers or slacks. Service dress may be worn with authorized undress ribbons, flying and specialist skill badges, and occupation badges. Depending on the order of dress, season and circumstances, personnel may wear different authorized footwear, headdress and outerwear, including a gabardine topcoat, lightweight raincoat, DEU parka, and RCAF leather jacket. Neckties are optional for RCAF personnel.

Operational uniforms are used across the entire CAF and are not specific to any single environmental command. These can range from field combat clothing featuring CADPAT digital camouflage to aviation dress.

==== Formal and mess dress uniform ====
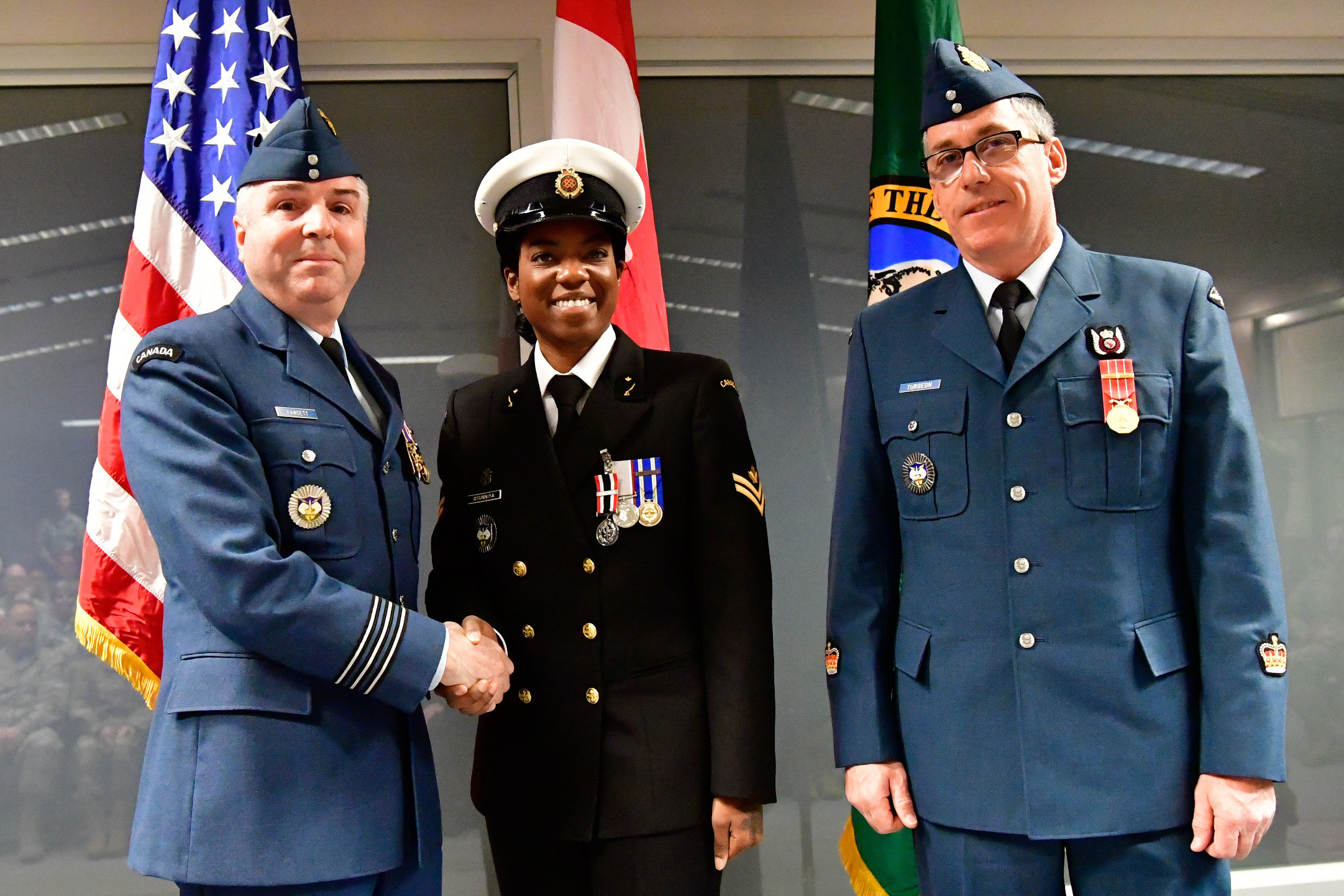
RCAF members stand next to a Royal Canadian Navy sailor, all three dressed in their respective commands' No. 1A ceremonial dress

RCAF personnel generally wear an appropriate order of air force service dress uniform with authorized medals and accoutrements for formal ceremonies. The CAF's Dress Instructions maintain a No. 1B full dress for RCAF pipers and drummers, made up of a light blue tunic, trousers, and facings, with a blue plume where the headdress permits. It is worn with the appropriate rank insignia and accoutrements, with air force piper and drummers authorized to wear dark blue capes and air force blue outerwear where applicable.

The RCAF's No. 2 mess dress is a formal dinner uniform featuring an air force blue mess dress jacket. Cummerbunds or waistcoats are worn according to the order of dress and authorized designs. Miniature orders, decorations and medals, and a single miniature flying or specialist skill badge may be worn on the jacket, although headdress are not worn. The No. 2B order is an alternative authorized mess dress based on service dress for members who do not have standard No. 2 mess dress. Authorized mess dress outerwear includes the gabardine topcoat, lightweight raincoat and white gloves.

== Symbols ==
The Royal Canadian Air Force uses several symbols to represent the command and its units, including badges, flags, and other symbols. The RCAF also has an official mascot to represent the force, Astra, introduced in March 2024.

=== Badges ===
The latest badge of the RCAF was approved on 15 March 2013, with the letters patent approving the badge published in the Canada Gazette on 30 November 2013.

1975–2013

2013–2026

2026–present

Badges used by the air force since unification

It features a gold eagle facing forward with its head turned to the left, set against a light blue background. The light blue colour and eagle had been associated with the RCAF for decades. The eagle's wings were outstretched on the RCAF's pre-unification badge, and the design was restored following the restoration of the RCAF's historical name in 2012.

The badge bears the RCAF motto, sic itur ad astra, which is Latin for "such is the pathway to the stars". The motto was adopted in 1975 with the formation of Air Command, and was also the motto used by the Canadian Air Force established in 1920. From 1924 to unification in 1968, the RCAF used the same motto as the British Royal Air Force's motto, per Ardua Ad Astra, Latin for "through adversity to the stars".

In addition to the RCAF badge, its commands, air divisions, wings, squadrons and support units have their own badges.

=== Flags ===
Flags are used as visual identifiers by the RCAF. This includes RCAF squadrons and support units, which typically have flags featuring the RCAF roundel and the unit's badge.

==== Colours ====
The RCAF and its squadrons have colours that are used as ceremonial flags to represent the RCAF's pride, honour, and devotion to the Sovereign and Canada. The King's Colour used by the RCAF is a Canadian maple leaf flag with the Sovereign's cypher in the centre, and represents is loyalty to The Crown. The current King's Colours is the third stand of colours, received on 1 September 2017.

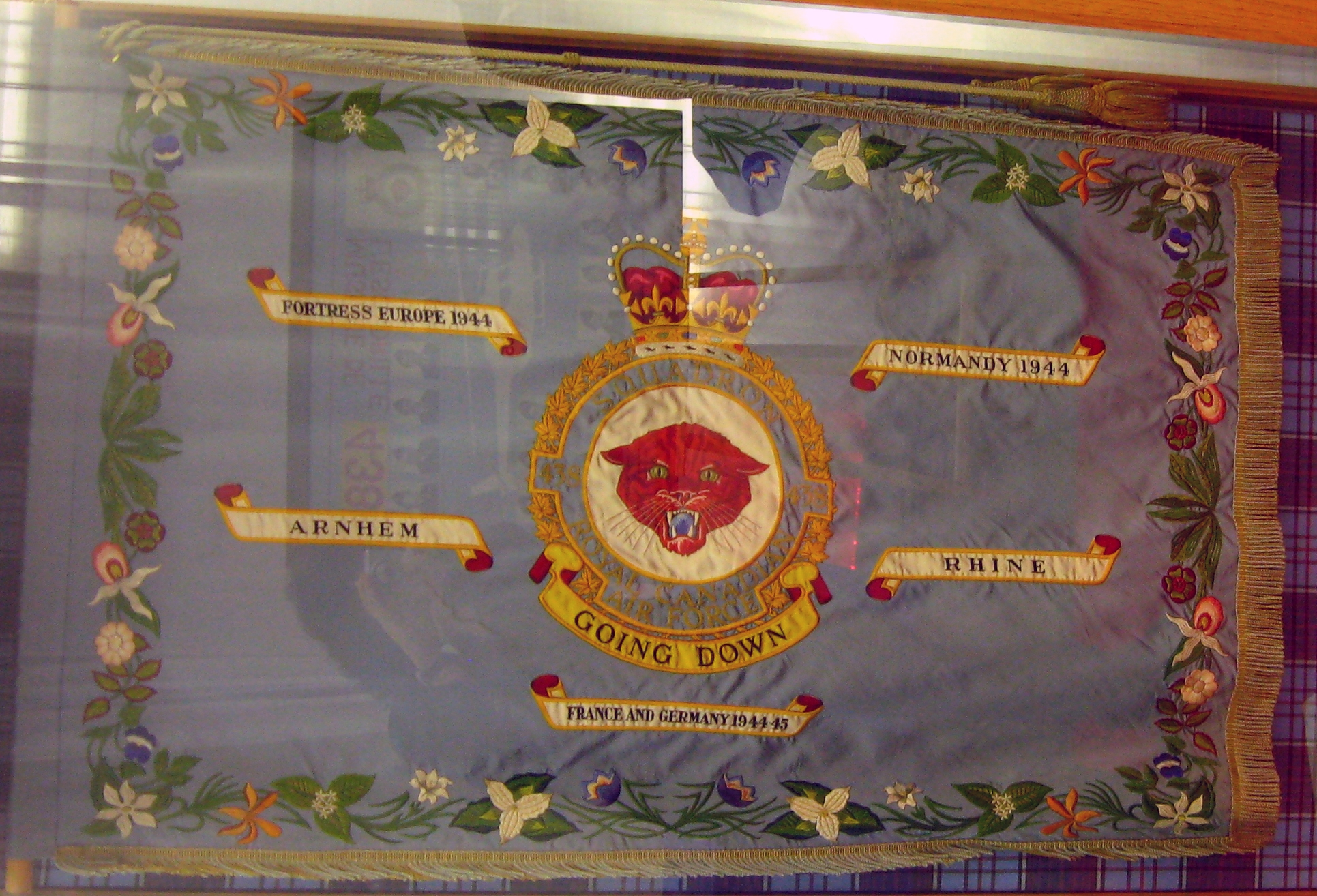
Squadron colours used by 438 Tactical Helicopter Squadron

The Command Colour is a blue flag bearing the RCAF badge at the centre and represents the RCAF's pride, cohesion and valour. The maple leaves at the four corners of the Command Colour point outward, as they did on the first RCAF Command Colour presented in 1950. In addition to the command, the flying squadrons are also issued their own colours.

==== Ensign ====
The ensign of the Royal Canadian Air Force

The RCAF ensign consists of a blue field, with the flag of Canada in the upper-left corner and an RCAF roundel on the fly.

The Canadian Air Force adopted its first ensign in 1921, using an ensign identical to that of the Royal Air Force, with the Union Jack in the upper-left corner and the British roundel on the fly. In June 1940, the use of a distinct RCAF ensign was approved, replacing the roundel's original red centre with a red maple leaf. However, this ensign was later retired in 1965 with the introduction of the unified Canadian Armed Forces ensign. The current RCAF ensign was introduced in 1982 with the creation of Air Command, which was authorized its own ensign.

=== Roundel ===
The RCAF's roundel evolved from a design derived from that of the British Royal Flying Corps, which had reversed the colours of the French Air Force's roundel, itself based on the French tricolour flag. The Canadian Air Force and the succeeding RCAF continued to use the British roundel, with that symbol used throughout the British Empire to identify imperial military aircraft.

The proposal for a unique RCAF roundel was first raised in 1921, with Canadian Air Force commander Arthur Kellam Tylee proposing an adapted roundel with a maple leaf at its centre. However, this was rejected by British Chief of Air Staff. In 1940, a unique RCAF roundel was authorized for use by King George VI, to replace the inner red circle with a red maple leaf. However, the introduction of a unique RCAF roundel did not take place until 1946. In 1965, the maple leaf featured on the RCAF roundel was updated with the eleven-point maple leaf used on the flag of Canada.

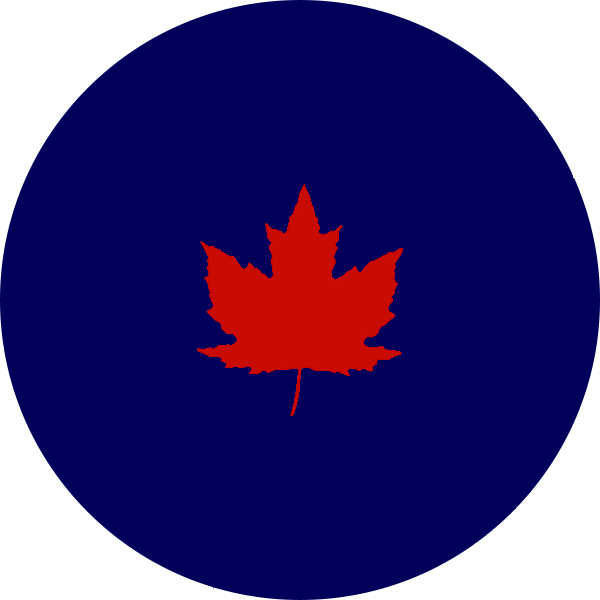
1946–1948

1946–1965

1965–current

Canadian Centennial
1967 variant

Low-visibility variant

=== Tartan ===
Members of the Royal Canadian Air Force Pipes and Drums wearing clothing featuring the RCAF tartan

The RCAF tartan uses light blue, dark blue and maroon, with a white line incorporated into the design. The tartan was designed in January 1942 by Group Captain Elmer G. Fullerton, the station commander of No. 9 Service Flying Training School RCAF. Fullerton designed the tartan to represent the RCAF for a planned Robbie Burns Day mess dinner. The original design featured a light blue, dark blue and maroon, with the white line later added by weavers in Gagetown, New Brunswick.

The design was endorsed by the Air Council, and a sample was sent to the Lord Lyon King of Arms in Scotland for approval and registration as the RCAF's official tartan. The design was approved by Lord Lyon on 15 August 1942, with the RCAF becoming the first air force to have its own distinctive tartan. The tartan has since been worn by members of RCAF pipe and drum bands and used for items such as ties, mess kit cummerbunds and women's sashes.

== See also ==
- List of air forces
- National Air Force Museum of Canada
- Planned Canadian Forces projects
- Royal Canadian Air Force Association
