= Canadian Forces Training Command =

Canadian Forces Training Command was an early component of the Canadian Forces after unification of the military in 1968. It was led by a two-star general.

This command was charged with training of pilots for the entire Canadian Forces after unification. It was eliminated in the simplification of the CF structure in 1975 and now under command of the Royal Canadian Air Force. Training is assigned to individual Squadrons of the RCAF.

== Squadrons ==
- 403 Squadron Helicopter Operational Training Squadron - 1 Wing Kingston
- 404 Squadron Maritime Patrol and Training Squadron - 14 Wing Greenwood
- 406 Squadron Maritime Operational Training Squadron - 12 Wing Shearwater
- 410 Squadron Tactical Fighter Training Squadron - 4 Wing Cold Lake
- 419 Squadron Tactical Fighter Training Squadron - 4 Wing Cold Lake
- 426 Squadron Transport Training Squadron - 8 Wing Trenton
- 441 Squadron Tactical Training Squadron - 4 Wing Cold Lake

== Aircraft ==
- Canadair CF-5
- Beechcraft Musketeer
- Canadair CL-41 Tutor
- Canadair CF-104
- CF-101 Voodoo
- T-33 Shooting Star
