= Chief Warrant Officer of the Air Force =

Royal Canadian Air Force Command Chief Warrant Officer
- Rank insignia
- Incumbent; CWO Renee J. Hansen since June 10, 2021
- Website: Official website

Royal Canadian Air Force Command Chief Warrant Officer (RCAF CCWO) is the title of the senior non-commissioned officer in the Royal Canadian Air Force.

They act as an advisor to the Commander of the RCAF on matters affecting all ranks in matters related to dress, discipline, morale and welfare, and quality of life.

Specifically, they are responsible for:

- Understanding the issues that personnel face through regular engagements with the aviators of the RCAF
- Promoting and motivating personnel to achieve the core values of the RCAF: Professionalism, Excellence and Teamwork
- Acting as caretaker of RCAF history and heritage and promoting its importance
- Managing the professional development of RCAF non-commissioned members
- Identifying, tracking and mentoring individuals to achieve senior appointments and positions in the Canadian Armed Forces

== List of Royal Canadian Air Force Command Chief Warrant Officers ==
Name	Tenure	Reference
CWO AG Moran, MMM CD	2 September 1975 - 1 August 1977	
CWO JMA (Moe) Blais, CD	1 August 1977 - 1 August 1980	
CWO WJ (Bob) Neve, MMM CD	1 August 1980 - 30 June 1982	
CWO PE (Ernie) Delaney, CD	30 June 1982 - 17 July 1984	
CWO R Ouellette, MMM CD	17 July 1984 - 21 July 1987	
CWO DJ Lloyed, MMM CD	21 July 1987 - 25 Aug 1989	
CWO PJ Sarty, MMM CD	25 August 1989 - 15 July 1992	
CWO JLGG Parent, CD	15 July 1992 - 27 June 1995	
CWO RN Elphick, MMM CD	27 June 1995 - 1 July 1997	
CWO JG Guilbault, MMM CD	1 July 1997 - 21 September 2001	
CWO D (Daniel) Gilbert, MMM CD	21 September 2001 - 29 July 2004	
CWO R (Roger) Bouchard, MMM CD	29 July 2004 - 27 July 2007	
CWO JJGR (Rene) Couturier, MMM CD	27 July 2007 - 30 June 2010	
CWO ML (Miles) Barham, MMM CD	30 June 2010 - 9 November 2012	
CWO KC (Kevin) West, MMM MSM CD	9 November 2012 - July 5, 2013	
CWO JCP (Patrick) Young, MMM CD	5 July 2013 - 9 June 2015	
CWO EGJ (Gérard) Poitras, MMM, MSM, CD	9 June 2015 - 14 June 2018	
CWO JRD (Denis) Gaudreault, MMM CD	14 June 2018 - 9 June 2021	
CWO WJ (John) Hall, MMM CD	10 June 2021 - 21 August 2024	
CWO Renee J. Hansen, MMM CD	21 August 2024 - present	
