= Montie Brewer =

Canadian businessman

Montie R. Brewer (born 1957) is an American businessman who was the president and CEO of Air Canada until March 31, 2009.

== Airline career ==
Montie Brewer joined Air Canada in 2002 as Executive Vice President, Commercial and was appointed President and CEO in 2004. Prior to this, he had been serving as Senior Vice President Planning at United Airlines, with responsibility for revenue and planning functions. Montie Brewer has also held senior positions at Northwest Airlines, Republic Airlines, Braniff and Trans World Airlines. He has planned and developed over 20 hub operations worldwide, managed low-cost airline operations as President of United Shuttle and successfully restructured the route networks of three major carriers.

While at United Airlines, Mr. Brewer acted as a key negotiator in the founding of Star Alliance, of which Air Canada was also a founding member. Brewer further sits on the Boards of Directors of Allegiant Travel Company and Aer Lingus.

As Executive Vice President, Commercial he was the chief architect of Air Canada’s new business model including the airline’s successful simplified fare structure. Brewer was also responsible for all commercial aspects of Air Canada including Air Canada Jazz, Air Canada Jetz, Air Canada Vacations, new businesses and a strategic direction of network planning, marketing and scheduling.

Montie Brewer resigned from Air Canada with effect April 1, 2009 and was replaced by Calvin Rovinescu.

From 2009 to 2013 Montie Brewer served on the Advisory board of British-based travel-technology start-up Everbread. Currently, he is on the Advisory board of Berlin-based travel-technology start-up flyiin.

== Personal life ==
Montie Brewer received a Bachelor's degree in Business Administration from Michigan State University. He is married and has two children. He lives in the Boston area.

Preceded by Robert Milton	CEO and President of Air Canada; 2004-2009	Succeeded by Calin Rovinescu
