= Michael Rousseau =

Canadian businessman (born 1958)

- Born: February 1958 (age 68); Cornwall, Ontario, Canada
- Education: York University (BBA)
- Title: President and CEO of Air Canada (2021–2026)

Michael Rousseau (born February 1958) is a Canadian businessman who was the president and chief executive officer (CEO) of Air Canada from 2021 until retirement in 2026. Rousseau joined Air Canada in 2007 after serving as president at the Hudson's Bay Company.

== Career ==
=== Early career ===
After graduating from university, Rousseau began working as an accountant for Deloitte Haskins & Sells. He would subsequently hold accounting and financial positions at Magna International, Moore Corp., and Silcorp Ltd. At the age of 30, he became chief financial officer of United Cigar Stores.

=== Hudson's Bay Company ===
Rousseau joined the Hudson's Bay Company as executive vice-president and chief financial officer in 2001. In 2006, he was appointed president of the Hudson's Bay Company before departing in 2007.

=== Air Canada ===
Rousseau joined Air Canada on October 22, 2007. He was appointed deputy chief executive in 2019. According to The Canadian Press, between 2007 and 2020, he was "widely seen as playing an instrumental role in changing the company's financial trajectory by boosting its profit margin, share price and pension plan, which moved from a $3.7-billion deficit in 2013 to a $2.6-billion surplus in 2019." He was appointed president and chief executive officer of Air Canada in February 2021, replacing the retiring Călin Rovinescu.

In 2022, the first year after the federal government lifted restrictions on Air Canada executive compensation, the company reported that Rousseau was paid $12.38-million in salary, stock awards, and bonuses. The figure represented a significant increase from his 2021 compensation, where he was paid around $1 million total, sparking controversy. In February 2024, he faced criticism from the federal parliament's committee on services for Canadians with disabilities over Air Canada's lack of accessibility. In November 2023, he had made a public apology as CEO after a wave of passenger complaints on accessibility. In December 2024, he was named chair of the Star Alliance board. Later that month, he faced scrutiny from the federal parliament's transport committee over the airline's decision to end the free carry-on allowance for basic fare classes.

As president of Air Canada, Rousseau presided over the 2025 Air Canada flight attendants strike. Steven Tufts of York University criticised Rousseau's role, saying that Air Canada's management exhibited a "lack of strategy and gross mismanagement of the entire situation," in particular that Rousseau had based the company's strategy on assuming that the federal government would not invoke Section 107 of the Canada Labour Code to force arbitration.

==== Unilingualism controversies ====
During his tenure as CEO of Air Canada, Rousseau faced repeated controversies over his inability to speak French. In November 2021, Rousseau made his first major speech as CEO of Air Canada, delivering a 26-minute speech on the airline's approach to recovering from the COVID-19 pandemic at an event of the Chamber of Commerce of Metropolitan Montreal at the Palais des congrès de Montréal. Of those 26 minutes, only 20 seconds were delivered in French, with the rest delivered in English. After the speech, a journalist from Le Canal Nouvelles questioned Rousseau in French on the lack of bilingualism, to which Rousseau asked that the question be repeated in English and then replied that "I've been able to live in Montreal without speaking French, and I think that's a testament to the city of Montreal" and that he had not taken any steps to learn French because "If you look at my work schedule, you'd understand why."

The responses sparked immediate controversy, with Rousseau facing criticism from the Montréal Chamber of Commerce, the federal Office of the Commissioner of Official Languages, politicians in Québec and at the federal level (including federal Prime Minister Justin Trudeau, the New Democratic Party, the Coalition Avenir Québec, Québec Solidaire, and the Quebec Liberal Party), as well as organisations representing both the anglophone minority in Québec and francophone minorities in other provinces. Rousseau subsequently released a statement saying that he "did not want in any way to disrespect [Quebecers] and francophones across the country. I apologize to those who were offended by my words", and pledging that he was "committed to improving my French, an official language of Canada and the language used in Quebec. The head office of this emblematic company is located in Montreal, and it is a source of pride for me as for my entire management team. I reiterate Air Canada's commitment to show respect for French and, as a leader, I will set the tone."

In May 2023, La Presse reported that the number of formal complaints Air Canada faced under the Official Languages Act had reached its highest level in a decade. In February 2024, Air Canada reported that 54% of the thirteen members of its board were capable of speaking some level of French, not including Rousseau. In the same report, the company reported that Rousseau earned around 12 million a year in salary, options, and bonuses.

After the ground incursion accident of Air Canada Express Flight 8646 on 22 March 2026, in a video statement released on X on behalf of the airline, Rousseau expressed his "deepest sorrow for everyone affected" and was "deeply saddened by the loss of two Jazz employees". The video led to 2,195 complaints being filed with the Commissioner of the Official Languages Committee, some from politicians in Quebec, due to Rousseau having said only two words in French; the remainder of the statement was delivered in English with French subtitles. On 24 March, Rousseau was summoned to Ottawa to appear before the Official Languages Committee because Air Canada is subject to the Official Languages Act. Carney said that the unilingual response from Rousseau showed "a lack of compassion" and told reporters "[w]e proudly live in a bilingual country, and companies like Air Canada particularly have a responsibility to always communicate in both official languages." The National Assembly in Quebec passed a motion for Rousseau to resign. Rousseau had previously faced complaints in 2021 and 2022 about uniligualism in official communications. On 30 March 2026, Air Canada's board of directors announced that Rousseau would be retiring by the end of September 2026.

== Personal life ==
Rousseau was born in Cornwall, Ontario in February 1958, graduated from York University with a Bachelor of Business Administration degree and is professionally an accountant.
