= Pierre Jean Jeanniot =

Canadian transportation executive (1933–2025)

Pierre Jean Jeanniot OC CQ
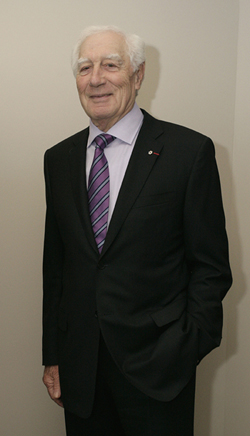
- Born: April 9, 1933; Montpellier, France
- Died: June 22, 2025 (aged 92); Montreal, Quebec, Canada
- Occupation: Businessman

Pierre J. Jeanniot O.C., C.Q. (French: [pjɛʁ ʒɑ̃ ʒanjo]; April 9, 1933 – June 22, 2025) was a Canadian businessman. He was president and CEO of JINMAG Inc., a consulting, management and investment company which he created in 1990.

== Life and career ==
Jeanniot was born in Montpellier, France on April 9, 1933. He held the honorary title of Director General Emeritus of the International Air Transport Association (IATA) in recognition of his major contribution to civil aviation worldwide as Director General and CEO, which he headed from 1993 to 2002. Under his leadership, IATA was transformed into the acknowledged leader of international civil aviation, promoting the interests of the airline community and its partners around the world, and becoming a major supplier of products and services for the industry. Following his retirement from IATA, Jeanniot was chairman of the board of THALES Canada Inc., a subsidiary of the international THALES group, from 2003 to 2009.

Jeanniot was president and CEO of Air Canada from 1984 to 1990. During this time, he directed and implemented the privatization of the State-owned airline, and headed it for the next two years. He previously held senior positions in Operations, Marketing, Strategic Planning and Technical Services, and contributed directly to the development of the first comprehensive flight data recorder - the famous "Black Box".

Jeanniot served on the board of Scotiabank from 1990 to 2004. He was a long-standing member of Scotia's executive committee, chairman of its Human Resources and Compensation Committee for senior executives, and chairman of its Succession Committee. He also served on Scotia's Audit Committee and its Corporate Governance Committee.

Jeanniot also served on the board of directors of airlines and telecommunications companies, airports, air navigation authorities and publishing houses. He served on the Board of a number of hi-tech companies.

In addition to his professional duties, Jeanniot devoted himself to many social and charitable organizations. He was Chancellor of the Université du Québec à Montréal, from 1995 to 2009, having previously held the position of chairman of the board, as well as president of the institution's foundation.

Jeanniot was Honorary President of the Canadian Cancer Society fund-raising campaign, and presided in a similar capacity for the Youth and Music Canada Foundation. He served as chairman of the Canadian Unity Council from 1991 to 1992, and was the Founding Chairman of the association "Canadians in Europe" with chapters in France, Belgium and the U.K. In March 2008, he became the founding chairman of the international Foundation on Antivirals, which promotes the research and development of drugs for neglected and emerging diseases in developing countries.

Jeanniot died in Montreal on June 22, 2025, at the age of 92.

== Honours ==
Jeanniot's efforts and accomplishments have been recognized by countries and institutions around the world. He was named Officer of the Order of Canada in 1989, and was appointed Chevalier de la Légion d'honneur by the French government in 1991. In 1995, H.M. King Hussein of Jordan awarded him the Independence Medal of the First Order, and he was named to l'Ordre national du Québec in 2002. Jeanniot was honoured with a Doctorat Honoris Causa, from the Université du Québec in 1988. He received the Management Achievement Award of McGill University's Faculty of Management in 1989, the Prix Rogers Demers – des Gens de l'Air in 1990, an Honorary Doctorate in International Law from Concordia University in 1997, and an Honorary Doctorate in Science from McGill University in 2006. In 2004, he was inducted into the Québec Air and Space Hall of Fame, and he was made a Fellow of the Royal Aeronautical Society in January 2008.

== Education ==
Jeanniot held a B.Sc. in Physics and Mathematics at Sir George Williams University (now Concordia University), Business Administration at McGill University in Montreal and Advanced Statistical Mathematics at New York University.

== Archives ==
There is a Pierre Jeanniot fonds at Library and Archives Canada. Archival reference number is R15495.

Preceded by Claude Taylor	CEO and President of Air Canada; 1984–1990	Succeeded by Claude Taylor
