= Claudette Commanda =

Canadian professor, advisor and activist

15th Chancellor of the University of Ottawa
- Incumbent
- Assumed office November 9, 2022
- President: Jacques Frémont
- Preceded by: Calin Rovinescu

Personal details
- Born: Kitigan Zibi Anishinabeg, Quebec, Canada
- Relatives: William Commanda (grandfather)
- Education: University of Ottawa

Claudette Commanda is a Canadian university professor, cultural advisor, indigenous rights activist, and an Algonquin Elder who was appointed the 15th Chancellor of the University of Ottawa, becoming the first indigenous person and fifth (Note: Although the University's news release referred to her as the third female to hold the role, a total of four women served as Chancellor prior to Commanda) woman to serve in the role.

== Early life and education ==
Commanda is an Anishinaabe Algonquin person from the Kitigan Zibi Anishinabeg First Nation in Outaouais, Quebec. Her grandfather is William Commanda. Her spirit name is She Who Dances with the Eagles, or Dancing Sky Eagle.

She started her studies at the University of Ottawa in 1987, later graduating from the Faculty of Arts in 1993. She then attended the Common Law Section of the University's Faculty of Law, graduating in 1997. While studying she founded a First Nations student association to help improve indigenous representation at the university.

== Career ==
=== University of Ottawa ===
She is a professor at the University of Ottawa, teaching with the Institute of Women's Studies at the faculty of social sciences, as well as at the faculty of law and the faculty of education. She also worked with the Indigenous studies program at the faculty of arts, where she taught courses relating to First Nations Women, Native education, First Nations people and history, and Indigenous traditions and decolonization.

While at the university she also served as the chair of the Aboriginal Education Council. She also established an Indigenous resource centre which eventually became the Mashkawazìwogamig Indigenous Resource Centre.

In 2017, following work done by the Indigenous Law Student Association at the University of Ottawa, the faculty of law created the position of elder in residence to support Indigenous law students through cultural, social, and career related events as well as to provide guidance and advice. Commanda was chosen as the inaugural holder of the position. She was also the special advisor on reconciliation to the dean of the faculty of law.

In 2022 she was chosen as the 15th chancellor of the University of Ottawa, replacing Calin Rovinescu, who had served in the role since 2015. With this she became the first Indigenous person to hold the role in the university's history, as well as the fourth woman to serve as chancellor, following Pauline Vanier, Gabrielle Léger, Huguette Labelle, and Michaëlle Jean. This also made her the first Indigenous person to serve on the university's board of governors.

=== Other work ===
Commanda is the CEO of the First Nations Confederacy of Cultural Education Centres, a non-profit national organization which protects and promotes the culture, languages, and traditional knowledge of First Nations people. She is also the CEO of the Maclean Day Schools Settlement Corporation (MDSSC), serving on its board of directors. The MDSSC runs a legacy fund through which it supports Federal Indian Day School Survivors and their families by funding projects related to language and culture, healing and wellness, commemoration, and truth telling.

She also served two terms on the board of governors for the First Nations University of Canada, and three terms on the Kitigan Zibi band council.

She was featured as an interview subject in two episodes of the true crime documentary television series Taken, which details stories of Canada's Missing and Murdered Indigenous Women and Girls. She was featured in the season 1 episode discussing Maisy Odjick and Shannon Alexander, as well as the season 2 episode discussing Hilary Wilson.

In September 2017 she spoke at the Standing Senate Committee on Aboriginal Peoples of the Senate of Canada.

In 2020 she was featured in an episode of the Canada School of Public Service's podcast Sitting by the Fire.

In 2022 she was announced as one of the 16 member's of the Minister of Canadian Heritage Pablo Rodriguez's Survivor-led Steering Committee for the Residential Schools National Monument. In February 2023 she spoke at the Indigenous and Northern Affairs Committee of the Canadian Parliament.

== Honours ==
Commanda was inducted into the Common Law Honour Society of the University of Ottawa Faculty of Law in 2009.

She received an Indspire Award in 2020 for Culture, Heritage, and Spirituality.

== Filmography ==
=== Television ===
Year	Title	Role	Notes	Ref.
2016-17	Taken	Herself	Interview subject; 2 episodes	

=== Podcasts ===
Year	Title	Role	Notes	Ref.
2020	Sitting by the Fire	Herself	Episode: "Indigenous Values and Teachings - A Lesson for All in Leadership"	
