= Air Canada Cargo =

Cargo airline

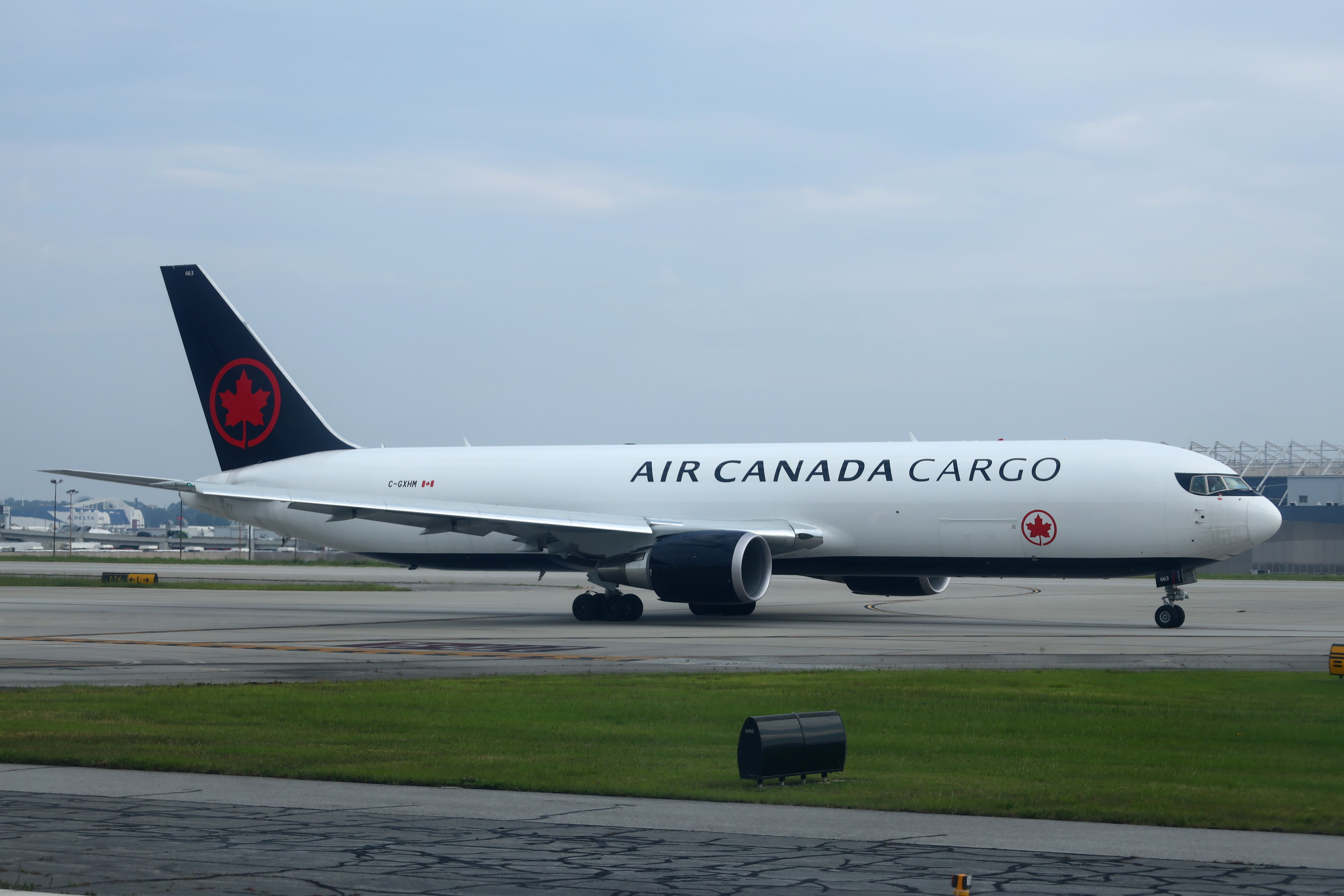
- Air Canada Cargo Boeing 767-300F
IATA	ICAO	Call sign
AC	ACA	AIR CANADA
- AOC #: 5262 (shared with Air Canada)
- Fleet size: 6
- Parent company: Air Canada
- Headquarters: Montreal, Quebec, Canada
- Website: aircanada.com/cargo

Air Canada Cargo is the cargo service subsidiary of Air Canada. Air Canada Cargo offers cargo services on domestic and trans-border flights, using the cargo capacity on aircraft operated by Air Canada and Air Canada Jazz on domestic and trans-border routes. Air Canada offers cargo services on its international passenger flights and also uses chartered, all-freighter aircraft for Canada – Europe and Canada – Asia services.

In March 2021, Air Canada Cargo launched an e-commerce business under a brand name called Rivo, through which Air Canada partnered with last-mile and first-mile providers to provide point-to-point delivery in Vancouver, Edmonton, Calgary, Winnipeg, Toronto, Ottawa, Montréal, Halifax, and St. John's. Air Canada Cargo is "not expecting to replace major players in this area, but this market is growing and (Air Canada Cargo) has the skills and the technology now to take advantage of that marketplace”.

== History ==
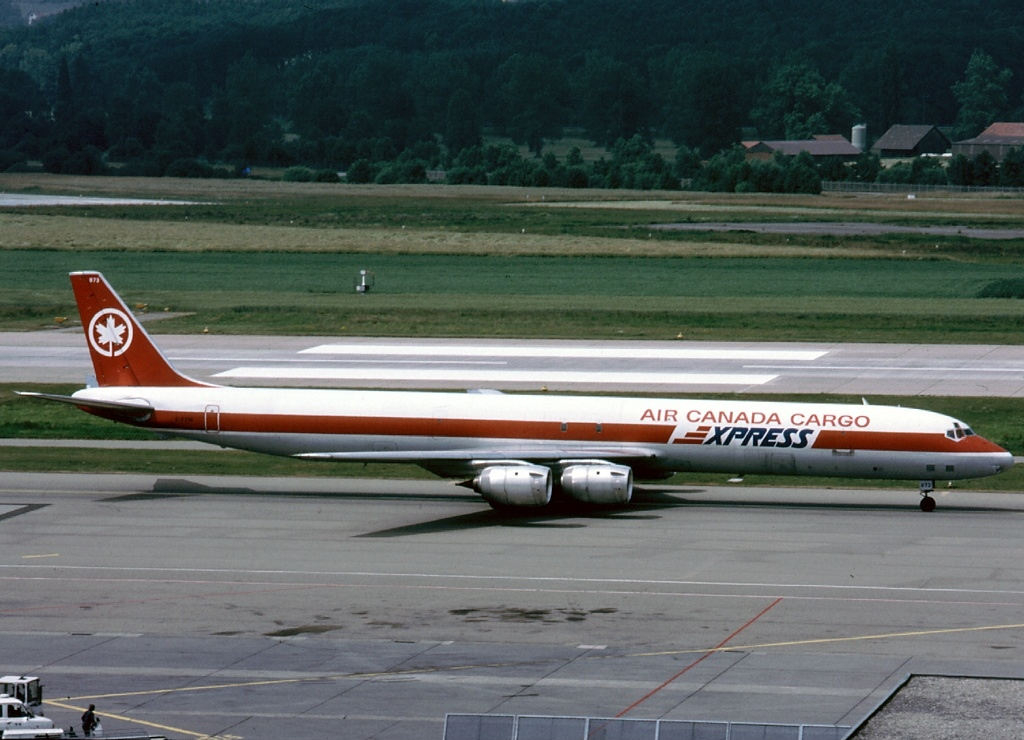
Air Canada Cargo Express Douglas DC-8-73F

Trans Canada Airlines (as Air Canada was then known) began cargo flights in 1953. In 1965, TCA rebranded as Air Canada, and in 1978, Air Canada began a cargo division, naming it Air Canada Cargo (which operated as "Air Canada Cargo Express"). The airline operated with Douglas DC-8-73F freighters until Air Canada decided to retire their fleet during the 1990s, retiring the Air Canada Cargo brand until deciding to bring it back during the 2020s. During the 1990s, 2000s and 2010s, Air Canada used their passenger planes' cargo capacity to carry cargo on their flights.

== Destinations ==
In the past, Air Canada Cargo operated Douglas DC-8 aircraft under the name "Air Canada Cargo Express".

Air Canada Cargo operates direct service to over 150 cities, with access to more than 450 additional destinations through interline partnerships and a trucking network..

== Fleet ==
Starting during the COVID-19 pandemic, Air Canada Cargo began using temporarily modified Boeing 777 and Airbus A330 (preighter) aircraft, which have additional available cargo space due to the removal of seats from the passenger cabin. Subsequently, Air Canada began converting some of its existing Boeing 767-300ER passenger aircraft to the freighter version.

On December 9, 2021, Air Canada Cargo's first of eight Boeing 767-300ER/BDSF dedicated freighter aircraft entered service between Toronto Pearson International Airport and Vancouver International Airport — addressing supply chain issues in the aftermath of the November 2021 Pacific Northwest floods. The dedicated cargo aircraft will operate on routes linking Toronto to Frankfurt, Miami, Quito, Lima, Mexico City, San Juan, and Guadalajara (the first time Air Canada Cargo will serve this destination). Additional destinations to be served in early 2022 include Halifax, St. John's, and Madrid as more freighters enter service. Air Canada also placed an order for two new Boeing 767-300F freighters in 2022. In 2024, the airline decided to cancel plans to bring the fleet up to 10 aircraft, due to softening cargo demand.

Air Canada Cargo fleet
Aircraft	In service	Orders	Notes
Boeing 767-300ER/BDSF	6	—	Some are former Air Canada Rouge planes.
Total	6	—	

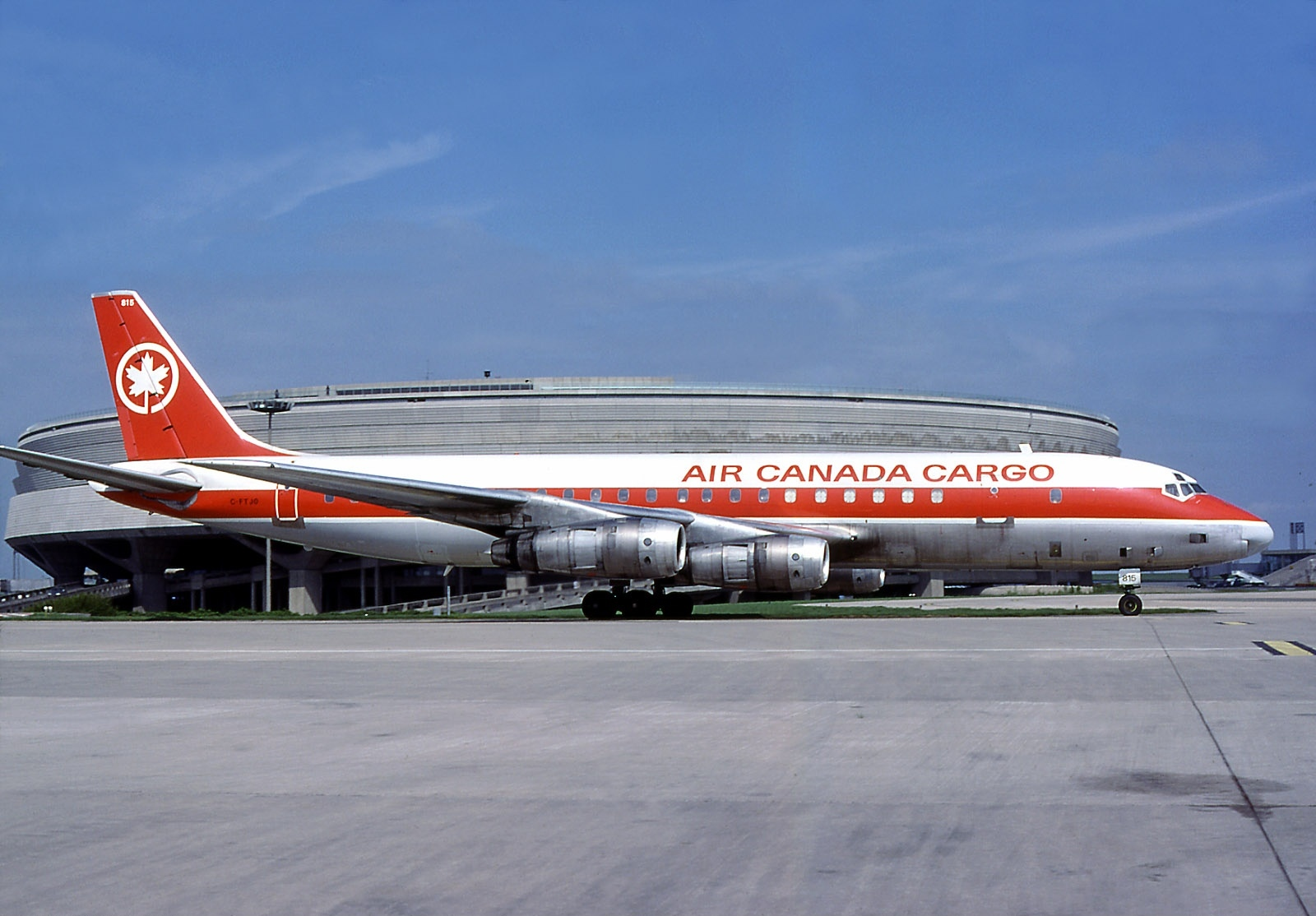
A Douglas DC-8-54(F) of Air Canada Cargo. This type was retired in the 70s-80s.

== See also ==
- Air Canada
- Canada Post
- Toronto Pearson International Airport heist, a 2023 grand theft at the Air Canada Cargo terminal
