= Robert Milton =

Aviation executive

Robert A. Milton (born July 30, 1960) is an American executive who was the chairman of the board of directors of United Airlines Holdings, which is the parent company of United Airlines. He serves as the lead independent director of Air Lease Corporation. He was the chairman, president and chief executive officer of ACE Aviation Holdings Inc., the parent company of Air Canada, from 2004 to 2012. He is also a former chairman, president and CEO of Air Canada.

== Early life and education ==
Milton was born in Boston, Massachusetts, and lived in Hong Kong, Belgium and the UK before completing his secondary school education in Singapore at the United World College of South East Asia in 1978. He then attended the Georgia Institute of Technology, from which he graduated in 1983 with a Bachelor of Science degree in industrial management.

== Career ==
After graduating, Milton became a founding partner of Air Eagle Holdings Inc., and later worked as an independent commercial aviation consultant to British Aerospace.

Milton became involved with Air Canada in 1992, initially on a consulting basis. He was appointed executive vice-president and chief operating officer in 1996, and then became president and CEO in 1999. Shortly after he became CEO, American Airlines and Onex initiated a hostile takeover bid for Air Canada, which Milton helped to successfully defeat. Milton led Air Canada through significant restructuring. In 2004, he became chairman, president and CEO of ACE Aviation Holdings – a parent holding company under which the reorganized Air Canada and separate legal entities including Aeroplan, Air Canada Jazz, Air Canada Technical Services, Air Canada Cargo, Air Canada Groundhandling, Destina.ca and Touram (Air Canada Vacations) are held.

Preceded by R. Lamar Durrett	CEO and President of Air Canada; 1999-2004	Succeeded by Montie Brewer
