= Air Canada =

National airline of Canada

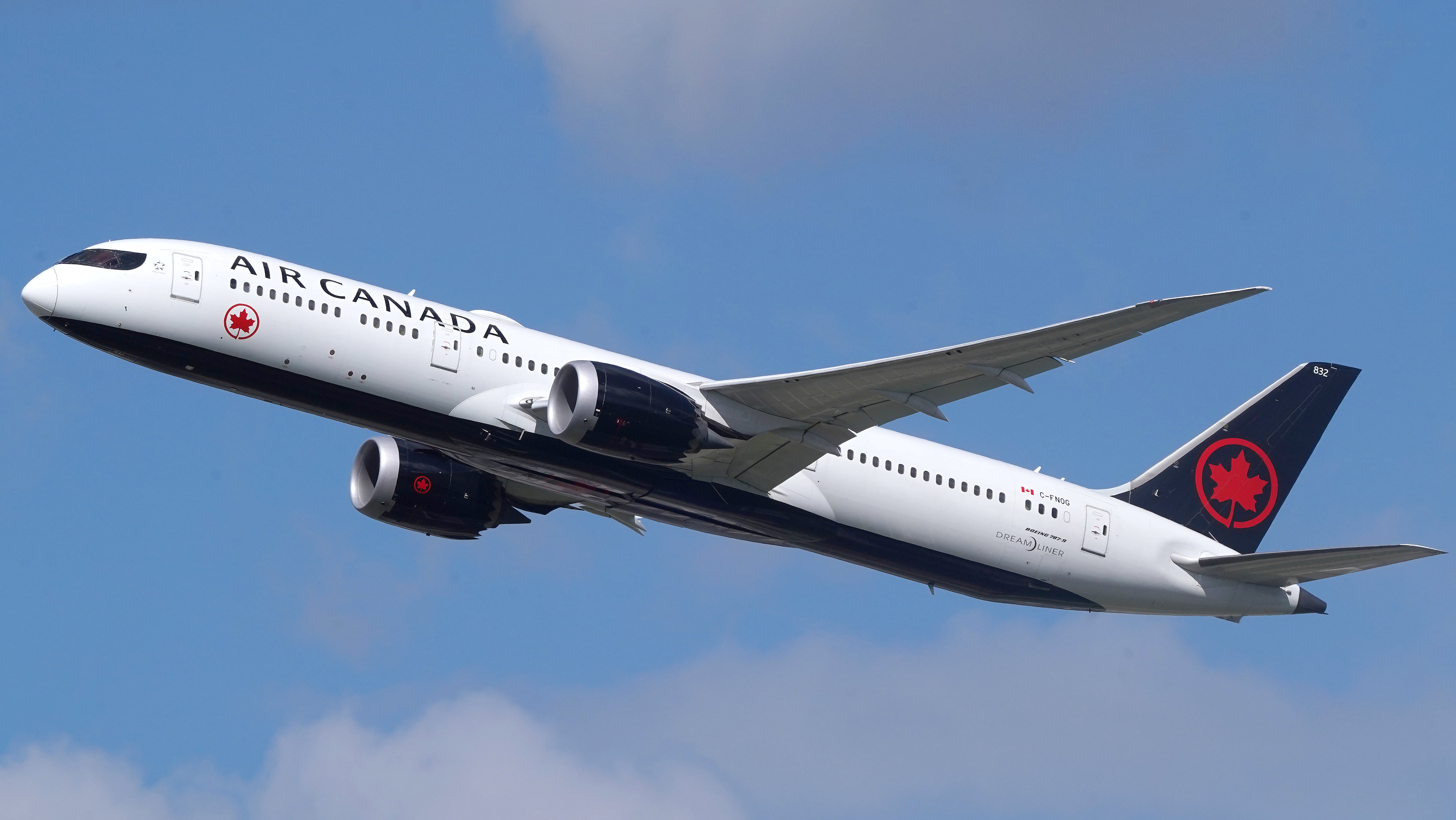
- An Air Canada Boeing 787-9
IATA	ICAO	Call sign
AC	ACA	AIR CANADA
- Founded: 10 April 1937; 89 years ago (as Trans-Canada Air Lines)
- Commenced operations: 1 January 1965; 61 years ago (as Air Canada)
- AOC #: Canada: 5262; United States: ARNF245C
- Hubs: Montréal–Trudeau; Toronto–Pearson; Vancouver
- Focus cities: Calgary; Halifax; Ottawa
- Frequent-flyer program: Aeroplan
- Alliance: Star Alliance
- Subsidiaries: Air Canada Cargo; Air Canada Express; Air Canada Jetz; Air Canada Rouge
- Fleet size: 210
- Destinations: 208
- Traded as: TSX: AC
- Headquarters: Saint-Laurent, Quebec, Canada
- Key people: Vagn Sørensen (chairman); Michael Rousseau (president & CEO)
- Revenue: ▲CA$21.8 billion (2023)
- Operating income: ▲CA$2.28 billion (2023)
- Net income: ▲CA$2.271 billion (2023)
- Total assets: ▲CA$30.197 billion (2023)
- Employees: 35,700 (2023)
- Website: www.aircanada.com

Air Canada is the flag carrier and the largest airline of Canada by fleet size and passengers carried. Headquartered in the borough of Saint-Laurent in Montreal, the airline was founded in 1937 and operates a fleet of 335 aircraft serving 208 destinations worldwide through its major hubs at Montréal–Trudeau, Toronto–Pearson and Vancouver. It is a founding member of Star Alliance. In 2025, the airline transported 45.3 million passengers.

Canada's national airline traces its origins to the Canadian federal government's 1936 creation of Trans-Canada Air Lines (TCA), which launched its first transcontinental flight routes in 1938. TCA was renamed Air Canada in 1965 and was privatized in 1988 following the deregulation of the Canadian aviation market. In 2000, Air Canada acquired its largest rival, Canadian Airlines. The carrier filed for bankruptcy protection in 2003 and emerged from restructuring the following year.

Air Canada operates a mixed fleet of Airbus and Boeing wide-body aircraft on long-haul routes alongside narrow-body aircraft on short- and medium-haul services. Its divisions include Air Canada Cargo, Air Canada Express, Air Canada Jetz, and Air Canada Rouge, while subsidiary Air Canada Vacations offers vacation packages to more than 90 destinations. Together with its regional partners, the airline operates an average of more than 1,600 scheduled flights daily.

== History ==
=== Trans-Canada Air Lines (1937–1965) ===
Air Canada's predecessor, Trans-Canada Air Lines (TCA), was created by federal legislation as a subsidiary of Canadian National Railway (CNR) on 11 April 1937. The newly created Department of Transport under Minister C. D. Howe desired an airline under government control to link cities on the Atlantic coast to those on the Pacific coast. Using $5 million in Crown seed money, two Lockheed Model 10 Electras and one Boeing Stearman biplane were purchased from Canadian Airways and experienced airline executives from United Airlines and American Airlines were brought in.

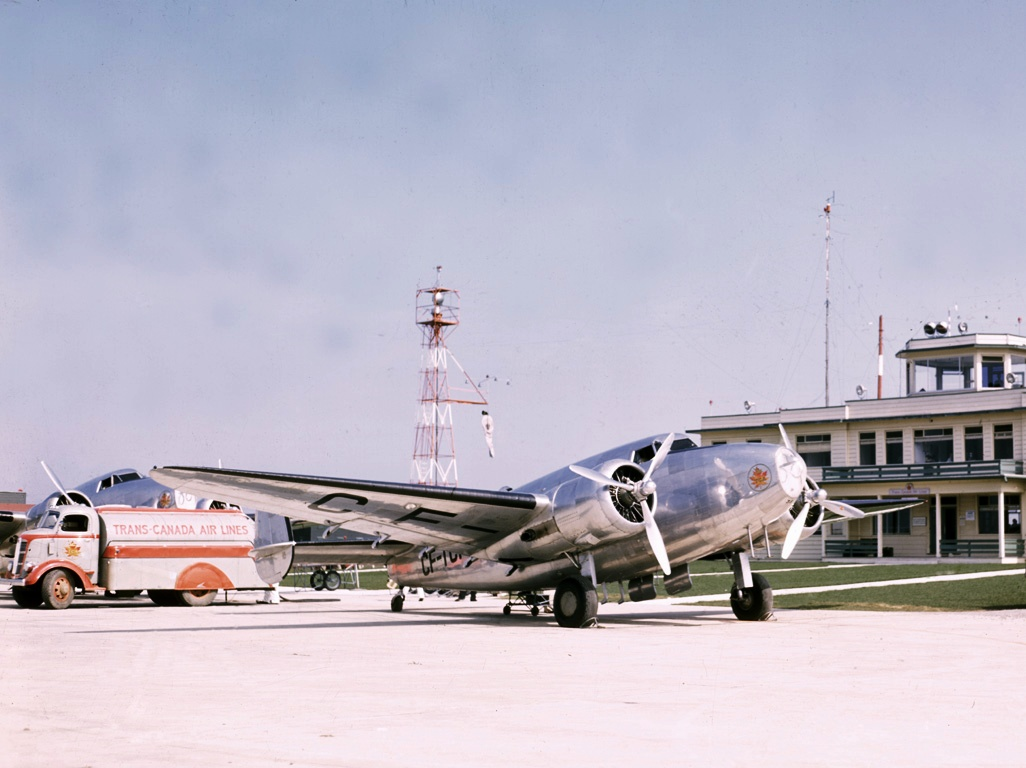
A TCA Lockheed Model 14 Super Electra at Malton Airport, 1939

Passenger flights began on 1 September 1937, with an Electra carrying two passengers and mail from Vancouver to Seattle, a $14.20 round trip, and, on 1 July 1938, TCA hired its first flight attendants. Transcontinental routes from Montreal to Vancouver began on 1 April 1939, using 12 Lockheed Model 14 Super Electras and six Lockheed Model 18 Lodestars. By January 1940, the airline had grown to about 579 employees.

Canadian Pacific Airlines (CP Air) suggested in 1942 a merger with TCA. Prime Minister William Lyon Mackenzie King rejected the proposal and introduced legislation regulating TCA as the only airline in Canada allowed to provide transcontinental flights. With the increase in air travel after World War II, CP Air was granted one coast-to-coast flight and a few international routes.

Originally headquartered in Winnipeg, also the site of its national maintenance base, the federal government moved TCA's headquarters to Montreal in 1949; the maintenance base would later also move east. With the development of the ReserVec in 1953, TCA became the first airline in the world to use a computer reservation system with remote terminals.

=== Renamed Air Canada and early years (1965–1990) ===
Revenue passenger-kilometres, scheduled flights only, in millions
Year	Traffic
1950	727
1955	1,551
1960	3,284
1965	5,702
1969	9,074
1971	10,343
1975	16,270
1980	23,752
1985	21,718
2000	448,006

By 1964, TCA had grown to become Canada's national airline and, in 1964, Jean Chrétien submitted a private member's bill to change the name of the airline from Trans-Canada Airlines to Air Canada, which TCA had long used as its French-language name. This bill failed but it was later resubmitted and passed, with the name change taking effect on 1 January 1965. Elizabeth II, the Queen of Canada, flew on the first aircraft to bear the name and livery of Air Canada when she departed for the United Kingdom at the end of her 1964 tour of Prince Edward Island, Quebec, and Ontario.

During the 1970s, government regulations ensured Air Canada's dominance over domestic regional carriers and rival CP Air. Short-haul carriers were each restricted to one of five regions, and could not compete directly with Air Canada and CP Air. CP Air was subject to capacity limits on intercontinental flights, and restricted from domestic operations. Air Canada's fares were also subject to regulation by the government.

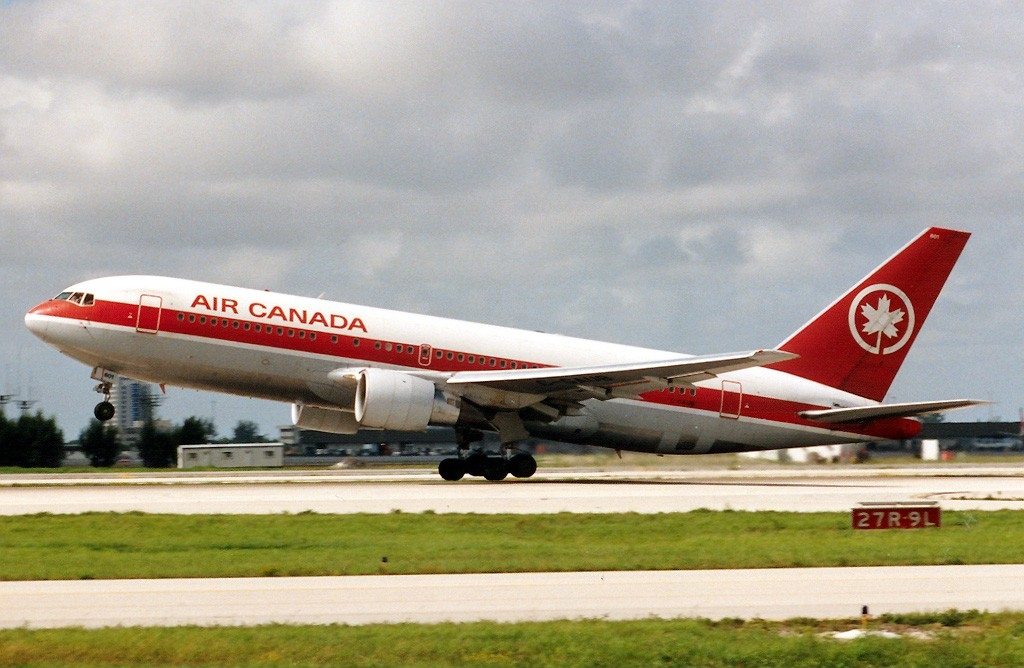
An Air Canada Boeing 767-200 in the 1964-1992 livery

In 1976, with reorganization at CNR, Air Canada became an independent Crown corporation. The Air Canada Act of 1978 ensured that the carrier would compete on a more equal footing with rival regional airlines and CP Air, and ended the government's direct regulatory control over Air Canada's routings, fares, and services. The act also transferred ownership from Canadian National Railway to a subsidiary of the national government. Deregulation of the Canadian airline market, under the new National Transportation Act, 1987 officially opened the airline market in Canada to equal competition. The carrier's fleet expansion saw the acquisition of Boeing 727, Boeing 747, and Lockheed Tristar jetliners. In 1978 Judy Cameron became the first female pilot hired to fly for any major Canadian carrier when she was hired to fly by Air Canada.

With new fleet expenditures outpacing earnings, Air Canada officials indicated that the carrier would need additional sources of capital to fund its modernization. By 1985 the Canadian government was indicating a willingness to privatize both Canadian National Railways and Air Canada. In 1988, Air Canada was privatized, and 43% of shares were sold on the public market, with the initial public offering completed in October of that year. By this time, long-haul rival CP Air had become Canadian Airlines International following its acquisition by Pacific Western Airlines.

On 7 December 1987, Air Canada became the first airline in the world with a fleet-wide non-smoking policy, and in 1989 became completely privatized. The successful privatization program was led by the president and CEO, Pierre J. Jeanniot. The associated extensive communication activities were aided by the non-executive chairman, Claude I. Taylor.

=== Strategic changes (1990s) ===
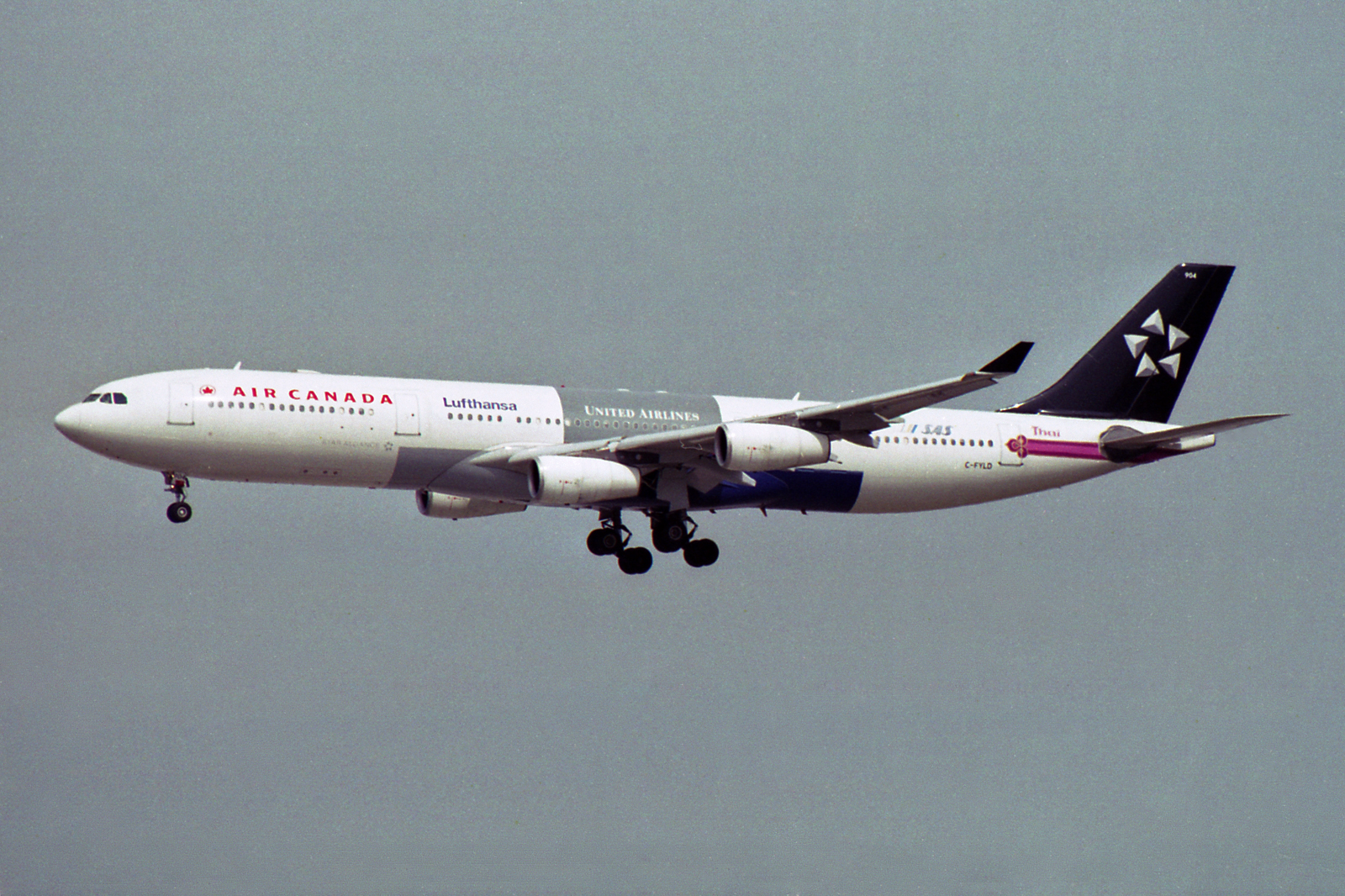
An Air Canada Airbus A340-300 in Star Alliance livery, 1997. Air Canada was a founding member of the airline alliance, established in 1997.

In the early 1990s, Air Canada encountered financial difficulties as the airline industry slumped in the aftermath of the Persian Gulf War. In response, the airline restructured management by hiring former Delta Air Lines executive Hollis L. Harris as its CEO. Harris restructured the airline's operations, reduced management positions, moved the corporate headquarters to Dorval Airport, and sold the enRoute card business to Diners Club in 1992. By 1994, Air Canada returned to profitability. The same year also saw the carrier winning route access to fly from Canada to the new Kansai Airport in Osaka, Japan.

In 1995, taking advantage of a new US-Canada open skies agreement, Air Canada added 30 new trans-border routes. In May 1997, Air Canada became a founding member of the Star Alliance, with the airline launching codeshares with several of the alliance's members. The second half of the 1990s saw the airline earn consistent profits, totalling $1 billion for the 1997 to 1999 period.

On 2 September 1998, pilots for Air Canada launched the company's first pilots' strike, demanding higher wages. At the end of 1999, the Canadian government relaxed some aviation regulations, aiming to consolidate the Canadian airline industry. That year, American Airlines in conjunction with Canadian financial company to Onex Corporation, launched takeover bids for ailing rival Canadian Airlines and Air Canada, spurring Air Canada to submit a competing offer for its largest rival.

=== Merger and reorganization (2000s) ===
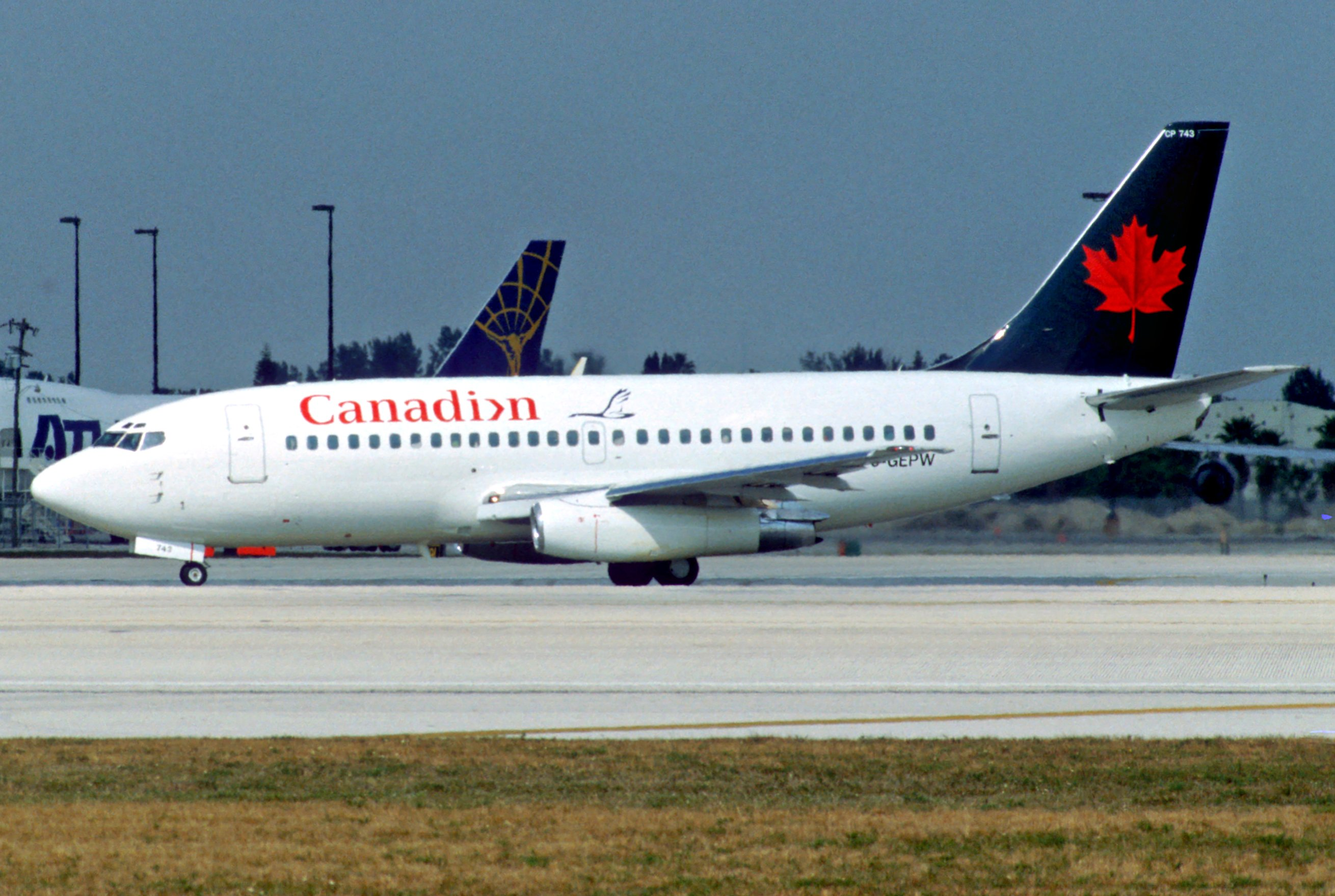
A Boeing 737-275 with a hybrid Air Canada-Canadian Airlines International livery. The latter airline was acquired by Air Canada in 2001.

In January 2000, Air Canada acquired Canada's second-largest air carrier, Canadian Airlines International, merging the latter's operations, becoming the world's twelfth-largest airline in the first decade of the 21st century. As Air Canada gained access to its former rival's financial statements, officials learned that the carrier was in worse financial shape than was previously believed. An expedited merger strategy was pursued, but in summer 2000 integration efforts led to flight delays, luggage problems and other frustrations. Service improved following Air Canada officials' pledge to do so by January 2001. The airline was confronted by the global aviation market downturn after the September 11 attacks and increased competition, posting back-to-back losses in 2001 and 2002.

==== Bankruptcy and restructuring ====
As Air Canada had employed a scorched earth policy to prevent the Onex proposed acquisition as one of its lines of defence, it had burdened itself with onerous contracts with almost all of its suppliers. As a result, on 1 April 2003, Air Canada filed for protection under the Companies' Creditors Arrangement Act; it emerged from this protection on 30 September 2004, 18 months later. During the period of bankruptcy protection, the company was subject to two competing bids from Cerberus Capital Management and Victor Li. The Cerberus bid would have seen former Prime Minister Brian Mulroney installed as chairman, being recruited by Cerberus' international advisory board chair Dan Quayle, the former vice-president of the United States. Cerberus was rejected because it had a reputation of changing existing employee pension agreements, a move strongly opposed by the CAW. At first, Air Canada selected Victor Li's Trinity Time Investments, which initially asked for a board veto and the chairmanship in return for investing $650 million in the airline. Li, who holds dual citizenship from Canada and Hong Kong, later demanded changes to the pension plan (which was not in his original takeover bid), but since the unions refused to budge, the bid was withdrawn.

Finally, Deutsche Bank unveiled an $850 million financing package for Air Canada, if it would cut $200 million in annual costs in addition to the $1.1 billion that the unions agreed on in 2003. The offer was accepted after last-minute talks between CEO Robert Milton and CAW president Buzz Hargrove resulted in union concessions.

ACE Aviation Holdings became the new parent company under which the reorganized Air Canada was held.

==== Fleet modernization ====
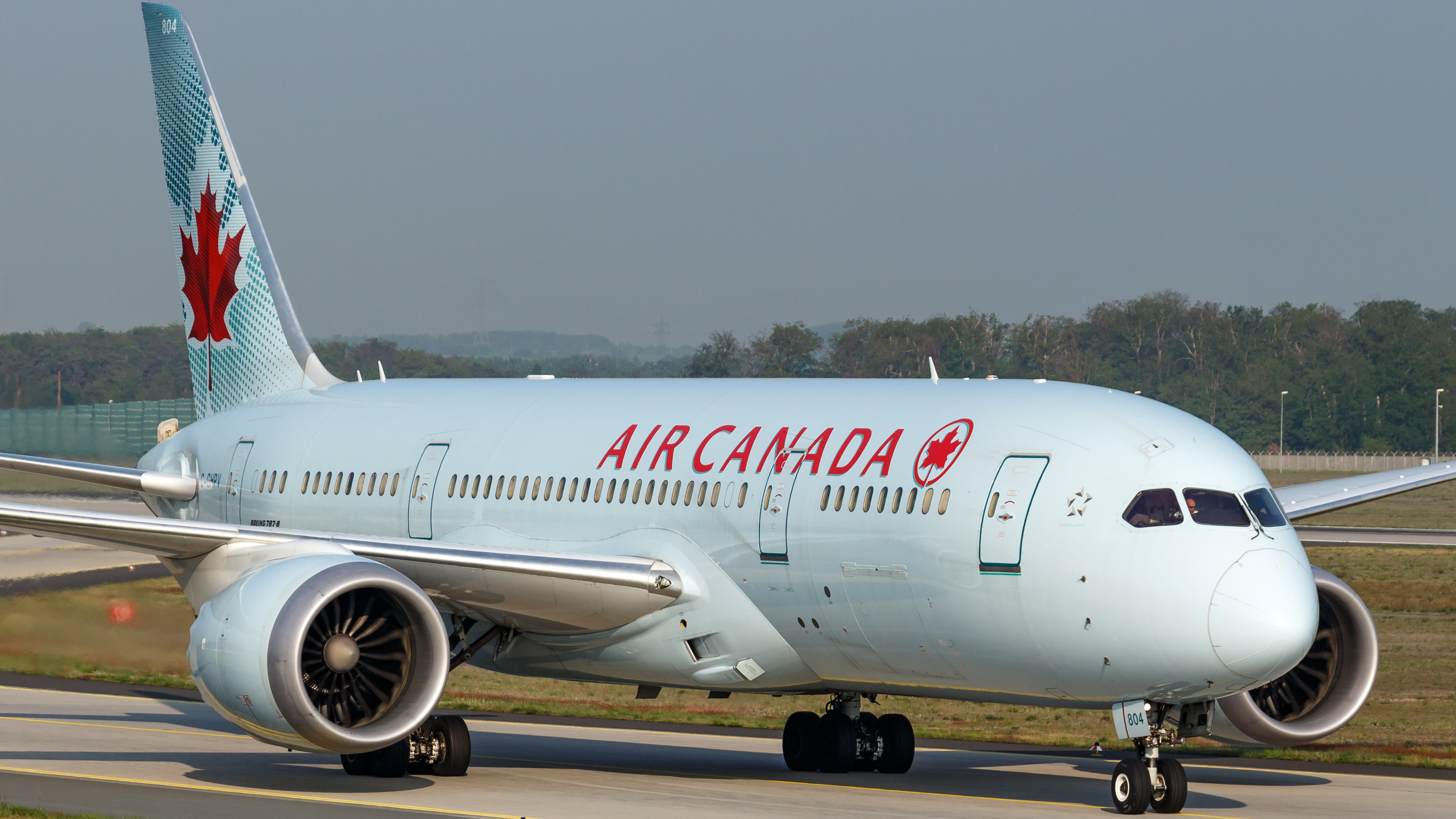
An Air Canada Boeing 787-8 in the 'Frosted Leaf' livery at Frankfurt Airport. The airline ordered this type in 2005.

In October 2004, Canadian singer Celine Dion became the face of Air Canada's relaunch to promote service in the international market after 18 months of bankruptcy protection. She recorded her single, "You and I", which subsequently appeared in several Air Canada commercials. On 19 October 2004, Air Canada unveiled a new aircraft colour scheme and uniforms. A Boeing 767-300ER was painted in the new silver-blue colour, and the dark green/almost black tail was replaced with a new version of the maple leaf known as the 'Frosted Leaf', which was also colloquially known as the "toothpaste" livery.

On 31 October 2004, the last Air Canada Boeing 747 flight landed in Toronto from Frankfurt as AC873, ending 33 years of 747 service with the airline. The Boeing 747-400s were replaced by the Airbus A340s for the time being.

On 9 November 2005, Air Canada agreed to renew its widebody fleet by purchasing 16 second-generation Boeing 777s (10 -300ERs, 6 -200LRs), and 14 Boeing 787-8 Dreamliners. It placed options on 18 Boeing 777s and 46 Boeing 787-8s and -9s. On 24 April 2007, Air Canada exercised half of its options for the Boeing 787. The firm order for the Dreamliners then stood at 37 plus 23 options, for a total of 60. The airline also cancelled orders for two Boeing 777Fs. In November 2007, Air Canada leased an additional Boeing 777-300ER. Deliveries of the 777s began in March 2007 and deliveries of the 787s began in May 2014.

==== Project XM ====
Started in July 2006 and since completed, Project XM: Extreme Makeover, was a $300 million aircraft interior replacement project to install new cabins on all aircraft. New aircraft such as the Boeing 777 were delivered with the new cabins factory installed. New cabin features included:

- In Executive First, new horizontal fully flat Executive First Suites (on Boeing 767s, Boeing 777s, and Airbus A330s).
- New seats in all classes on all aircraft, with new entertainment options.
- Personal AVOD (8.9 in or 230 mm touchscreen LCD) in Economy class (domestic and international) and Executive Class (domestic).
- Larger AVOD (12 in or 300 mm touchscreen LCD) equipped with noise-cancelling Sennheiser headphones available in Executive First Suites.
- Interactive games at all seats in Executive and Economy; XM Radio Canada available at every seat.
- USB ports to recharge electronic devices and for game controllers at all seats; 120 VAC plugs in most seats;
  - In Economy (2 per triple) (1 per double) (3 per quad).
  - In First Class/Executive (All seats)

==== Late 2000s financial difficulties ====
High fuel prices and the Great Recession caused Air Canada significant financial difficulties in the late 2000s. In June 2008, the airline announced it would lay off over 2,000 employees and cut its capacity by 7 per cent by the first quarter of 2009. President and CEO Montie Brewer expressed confidence that the airline would weather the economic downturn.

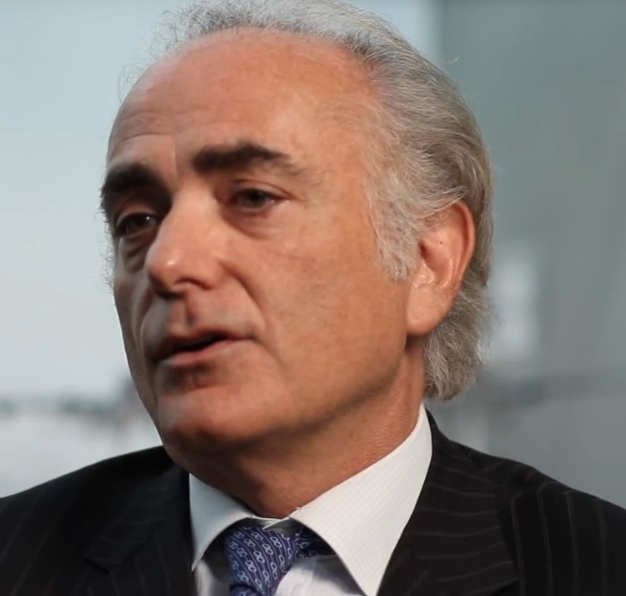
Călin Rovinescu in 2015. Rovinescu served as the CEO of Air Canada from 2009 to 2021.

Brewer resigned on 30 March 2009 and was replaced by Călin Rovinescu on 1 April. Rovinescu was the first Canadian to be company president since Claude Taylor in 1992. Rovinescu, reported to be "an enforcer", was Air Canada's chief restructuring officer during its 2003 bankruptcy; he resigned that year after unions rejected his demands.

Air Canada's contracts with four unions also expired around this time. The airline stated that its $2.85 billion pension shortfall (which grew from $1.2 billion in 2007) was a "liquidity risk" in its first-quarter report, and it required new financing and pension "relief" to conserve cash for 2010 operations. The company was obligated to pay $650 million into the pension fund but it suffered a 2009 Q1 loss of $400 million, so it requested a moratorium on its pension payments in 2009. The unions had insisted on financial guarantees before agreeing on a deal. Rejecting union calls for a direct bailout of the company, federal finance minister Jim Flaherty instead appointed retired judge James Farley to mediate pension issues between the company, the unions representing its employees, and retirees. Farley had presided over the company's 2003 bankruptcy.

In July 2009, Air Canada requested and received CA$1 billion in financial aid from a consortium of entities, including the Canadian government, ACE, and associate company Aeroplan. The Centre for Aviation reported that only CA$600 million was actually loaned to Air Canada; the rest of the money was from sale-leaseback accounting and "aggregating an array of biscuit-tin savings".

=== 2010s ===
In December 2010, ACE sold 44 million Air Canada shares, followed by the remaining 31 million shares in November 2012 to Cormark Securities Inc.

==== New branding and fleet ====
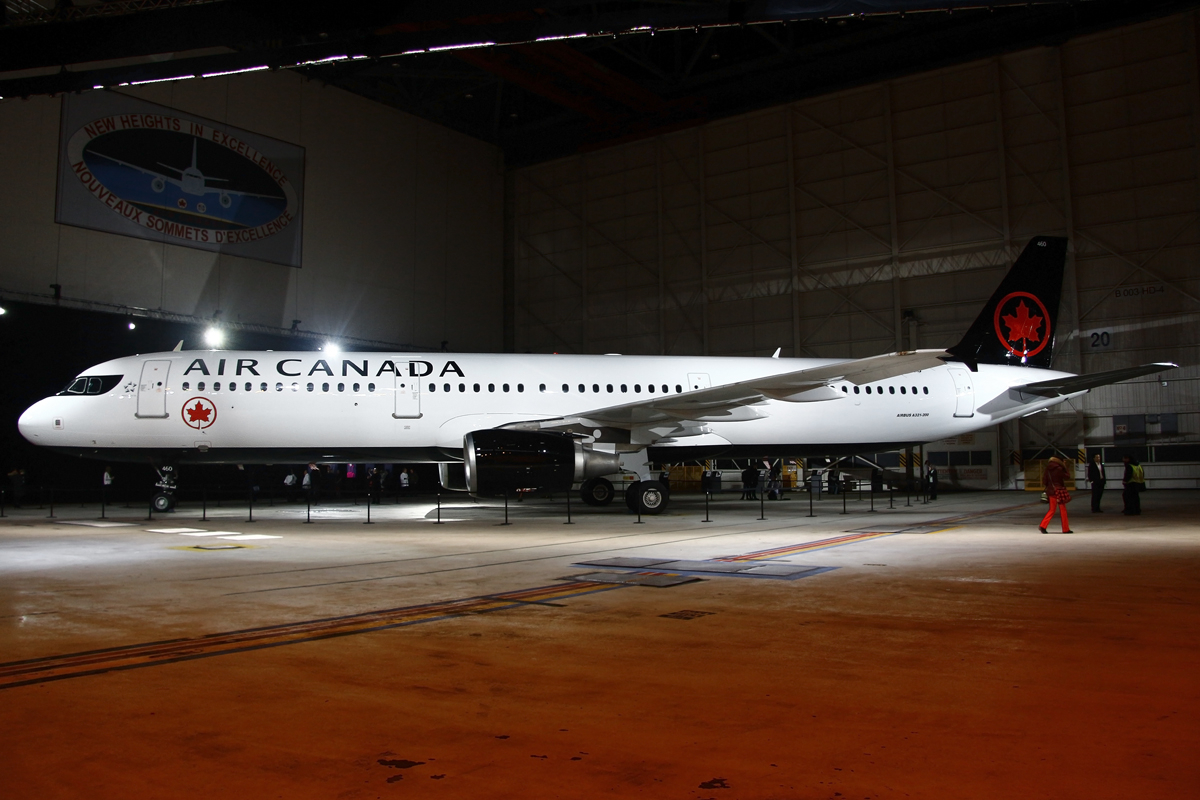
New livery for Air Canada's fleet, unveiled at Montréal–Trudeau International Airport in February 2017 with an Airbus A321

On 9 February 2017, a new retro red and black aircraft livery was launched, to coincide with Air Canada's 80th anniversary and Canada's 150th anniversary of Confederation. The update includes design aspects from the logo used between 1964 and 1992, with an overall white colour scheme, with a black underside, tail fin with red maple leaf rondelle, black "Air Canada" lettering with a red maple leaf rondelle underneath, and a black "mask" surrounding the cockpit windows.

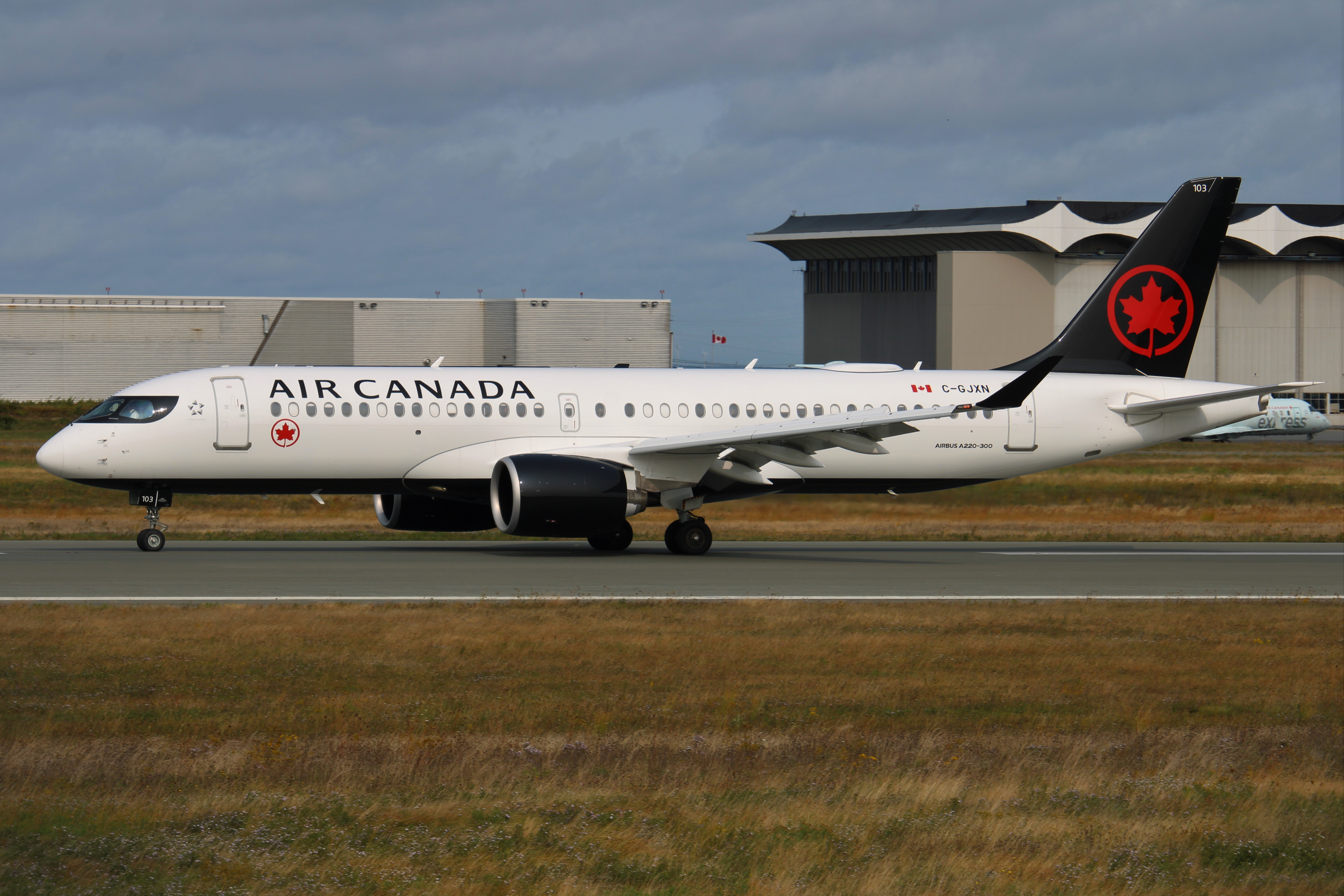
An Air Canada Airbus A220-300 at Halifax Stanfield International Airport, 2020

In December 2013, Air Canada ordered 61 Boeing 737 MAX single-aisle narrow body aircraft to replace its existing fleet of Airbus A320 series aircraft with the first MAX 8 variant delivered on 2 November 2017. Some Airbus A319s will be transferred to Air Canada's Rouge subsidiary, with the remaining fleet retired. As part of the deal, Boeing purchased 25 Embraer E190s from Air Canada that were retired in 2016. The same year, Air Canada signed an agreement with Bombardier Aerospace to replace the E190s with Airbus A220/CSeries aircraft from 2019.

In July 2017, Air Canada reintroduced Premium Economy on its North American wide-body flights.

In April 2018, Air Canada rebranded its international business class cabin as Air Canada Signature Class. Passengers could expect an enhanced menu, including the new Air Canada Signature Cocktail, as well as new amenity kits, a chauffeur service (using BMW vehicles) at its hubs during domestic to international connections, and access to the Air Canada Signature Suite at Toronto Pearson International Airport. On select North American routes, Air Canada Signature Service is offered on widebody aircraft.

In May 2018, Air Canada listed Taiwan as part of China to comply with a requirement of China's civil aviation administration. On 6 June 2018, Air Canada and Air China signed a joint venture, the first joint venture between a North American and Chinese airline.

==== Attempted acquisition of Transat A.T. ====
On 16 May 2019, Air Canada announced it was in exclusive talks to buy Transat A.T., the parent company that owns Air Transat, for CA$520 million.

On 27 June 2019, Transat A.T. agreed to be purchased by Air Canada for CA$13 per share. On 11 August 2019, Air Canada raised the purchase price of Transat A.T. to CA$18 per share. The overall value of the deal was now $720 million. On 23 August 2019, 95% of Transat A.T. shareholders approved the acquisition by Air Canada on that basis. The agreement was revised downwards in October 2020 to CA$5 per share, reflecting the challenges posed to the airline industry by the COVID-19 pandemic.

The plan was "expected to face intense scrutiny from the Competition Bureau and other regulatory authorities, including in Europe", according to CBC News. While the Government of Canada approved the takeover on 11 February 2021, it was dropped in April 2021 following a failure to secure European Commission approval.

=== 2020s ===
==== COVID-19 pandemic ====
Travel restrictions caused by the COVID-19 pandemic forced Air Canada to heavily restrict service. On 18 March 2020, the airline announced it would suspend most of its flights by 31 March. Service began to return to normal on 22 May, with flights to more cities being added over the summer. In its first quarterly financial report, Air Canada announced it had lost CA$1.05 billion, compared to a profit of CA$345 million in Q1 2019. The airline similarly suffered in the third quarter, reporting a loss of CA$685 million. It stated capacity in the fourth quarter of the 2020 fiscal year would be 75 per cent lower than the previous year. In June 2022, after the provincial governments across the country began lifting pandemic-era restrictions, Air Canada announced it was cancelling over 150 daily flights in the summer due to unprecedented and unexpected pressure in the aviation industry.

In April 2021, the Government of Canada acquired 6.4% of Air Canada as a part of a $5.9 billion COVID-19 related assistance package, and has not ruled out further investment. In 2024, the Government sold its stake in Air Canada, confirming they "...did not intend to be a long-term owner of the shares."

In September 2022, Air Canada welcomed the Government of Canada's decision to lift remaining COVID-19 restrictions, including requirements for wearing masks on aircraft, testing and quarantine, and the compulsory use of ArriveCAN beginning 1 October 2022 and noted that the measures were not justified by science.

==== Fleet renewal, expansion, Airbus A320 family retrofit, and transfer of Boeing 737 MAX to Air Canada Rouge ====
On 22 March 2022, Air Canada placed a order for 26 Airbus A321XLR aircraft, making Air Canada the second airline in Canada to fly the Airbus A321neo family of aircraft, alongside Air Transat. On September 25, 2023, Air Canada also placed a order for 18 Boeing 787-10 Dreamliner aircraft.

On 23 October 2023, Air Canada announced that it would retrofit the Airbus A321, and 8 of its Airbus A320 aircraft with the A220 standard to replace the XM cabin, which would feature Airspace XL bins, new entertainment screens, exterior cameras, and satellite based Wi-Fi.

On 17 December 2024, Air Canada announced that it would transfer its Boeing 737 MAX 8 aircraft to Air Canada Rouge, and it would create a hub for Rouge at Vancouver International Airport. Air Canada Rouge's Airbus A320 and A321 fleet will transfer to the mainline fleet as part of the transition, and would be retrofitted with the A220 standard.

==== Flight attendants strike ====
In August 2025, Air Canada experienced a work stoppage involving more than 10,000 flight attendants represented by the Canadian Union of Public Employees. The strike began on 16 August and led to the cancellation of approximately 130,000 passenger journeys per day.

A tentative agreement was reached on 19 August, and operations resumed later that day. The wage component of the agreement was subsequently rejected by 99.1% of members, although other provisions remained in effect.

The strike resulted in 3,200 flight cancellations and an estimated revenue loss of C$430 million.

==== CEO resignation ====
On 30 March 2026, the company announced that its chief executive, Michael Rousseau, will retire from his position by the end of September 2026, following criticism over his condolence speech of the crash of Air Canada Express Flight 8646, delivered almost entirely in English with French subtitles, instead of posting equivalent statements in both languages as required by the Official Languages Act. Air Canada's board said it would begin a process to find his replacement.

On 8 July 2026, Air Canada announced that Anko van der Werff, current president and CEO of Scandinavian Airlines, would become the next president and CEO of the company by the end of January 2027.

== Corporate affairs ==
=== Business trends ===
Air Canada had been loss-making for several years, but was profitable from 2012; however, due to the impact of the COVID-19 pandemic, the company was again loss-making in 2020. The key trends for the Air Canada group, including Air Canada Express and Air Canada rouge, are (years ending 31 December):

	Operating revenue (C$M)	Net profit (C$M)	Number of employees (FTE) (Note: on average)	Number of passengers (M)	Passenger load factor (%)	Number of aircraft (Note: at year end)	Notes/ sources
2009	9,739	−24	22,900	30	80.7	332	
2010	10,786	−24	23,200	32	81.7	328	
2011	11,612	−249	23,700	33.9	81.6	331	
2012	12,114	131	24,000	34.9	82.7	351	
2013	12,382	10	24,500	35.8	82.8	352	
2014	13,272	105	24,400	38.5	83.4	364	
2015	13,868	308	24,900	41.1	83.5	370	
2016	14,677	876	26,100	44.8	82.5	381	
2017	16,252	2,038	27,800	48.1	82.3	395	
2018	18,065	167	29,900	50.9	83.3	400	
2019	19,131	1,476	32,900	51.5	83.4	403	
2020	5,833	−4,647	21,100	13.8	61.6	344	(Note: 2020: Activities and income in fiscal 2020 were severely reduced by the impact of the coronavirus pandemic)
2021	6,400	−3,602	19,800	13.2	63.0	337	(Note: 2021: Activities and income in fiscal 2021 were severely reduced by the impact of the coronavirus pandemic)
2022	16,556	−1,700	30,500	36.1	80.5	345	
2023	21,833	2,276	35,700	44.8	86.7	361	
2024	22,255	1,720	37,100	45.9	85.0	354	
2025	22,372	644	37,000	45.3	84.6	353	(Note: 2025: Data is for the first nine months ended 30 September 2025; activities were impacted by a labour disruption in the third quarter.)

=== Ownership ===
Air Canada became fully privatized in 1989, and its variable voting shares are traded on the Toronto Stock Exchange (TSX:AC), and, since 29 July 2016, on OTCQX International Premier in the US under the single ticker symbol "ACDVF".

Currently, the Air Canada Public Participation Act (ACPPA) limits ownership of Air Canada's voting interests by non-residents of Canada to a maximum of 25%. The Canada Transportation Act (CTA) also requires that Canadians own and control at least 75% of the voting interests of licensed Canadian carriers. Accordingly, Air Canada's articles contain restrictions to ensure that it remains "Canadian" as defined under the CTA.

==== Executives ====
Prior to 1976, Air Canada was a department of the Canadian National Railway (CNR), helmed by a department head who reported to the president of CNR. Since 1976, the following have been CEO and president:

- 1976–1984: Claude Taylor (accountant; former Air Canada reservation agent and executive)
- 1984–1990: Pierre Jeanniot (former Overhaul Research Technician and Air Canada executive)
- 1990–1992: Claude Taylor
- 1992–1996: Hollis L. Harris (World Airways CEO 2001–04, Continental CEO and President, 1990–92, President of Delta)
- 1996–1999: R. Lamar Durrett (former executive with Delta, Continental and System One)
- 1999–2004: Robert Milton (founding partner of Air Eagle Holdings Incorporated)
- 2004–2009: Montie Brewer (former United Airlines executive)
- 2009 – February 2021: Călin Rovinescu
- February 2021 – present: Michael Rousseau

=== Headquarters and Operations Centre ===
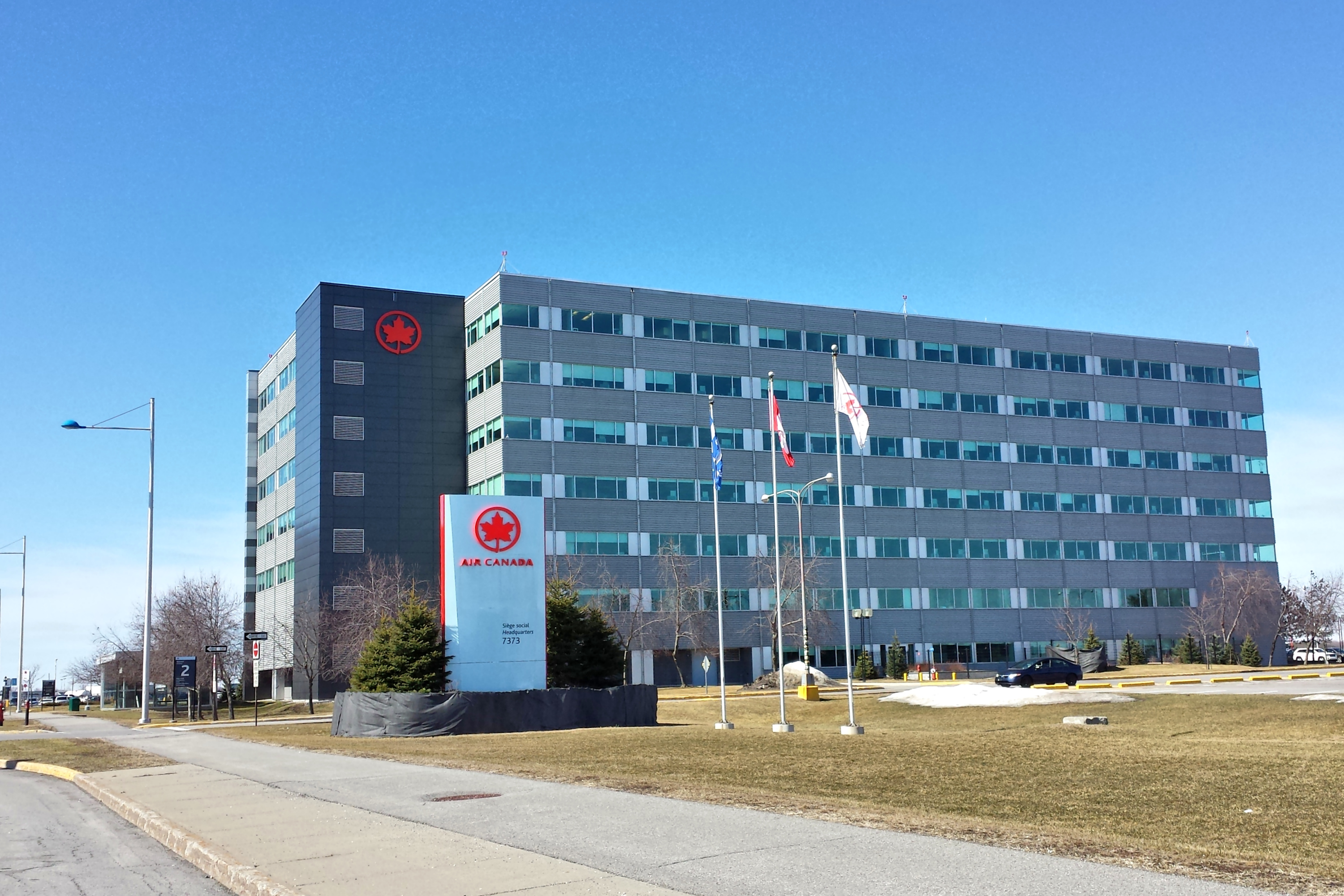
The Air Canada Centre at Montréal–Pierre Elliott Trudeau International Airport serves as the airline's headquarters.

By federal law (Air Canada Public Participation Act), Air Canada is obligated to keep its head office in Montreal. Its corporate headquarters is Air Canada Centre (French: Centre Air Canada), also known as La Rondelle ("The Puck" in French), a 7-storey building located on the grounds of Montréal–Trudeau International Airport in Saint-Laurent.

In 1975, Air Canada was headquartered at 1 Place Ville-Marie in Montreal. In 1990, the airline moved its headquarters to the airport to cut costs.

Air Canada's Operations Centre is located in Brampton, Ontario, and oversees all flight operations including dispatching and crew scheduling. It has an off-site disaster recovery site and is typically unused.

=== Air Canada Pension Plan ===
Trans-Canada Capital manages Air Canada's pension plan and its $30 billion in assets. TCC has allocated funds in: Canadian fixed income; absolute return hedge funds; and, real estate, infrastructure, private equity, private debt.TCC's team grew the fund from $23 billion in 2020 to $30 billion in 2024. TCC began a partnership with Pretium Partners in 2013, investing in their single-family rental real estate strategy. The fund adheres to Environmental, social, and governance (ESG) rules and refrains from investing in companies associated with coal, tobacco and weapons production.

=== Subsidiaries ===
==== Air Canada Cargo ====
Air Canada Cargo is the company's freight carrying division based at Toronto-Pearson, offering more than 150 shipping destinations through the Air Canada airline network, ground logistics and airline partners. Its route network has focused on European destinations through Eastern Canada departure points, along with direct services from Vancouver and Calgary to Frankfurt, London, Paris, and Zurich.

In Toronto, a new cargo terminal was completed in early 2002 which featured modernized inventory and conveyor systems. Cargo terminals are also found in Vancouver, Calgary and Montreal.

On 17 April 2023, a grand theft occurred at the Air Canada cargo terminal at Toronto Pearson International Airport. A container containing gold bars and currency valued at over C$20 million was stolen. Two Air Canada employees allegedly participated in this theft.

==== Air Canada Express ====
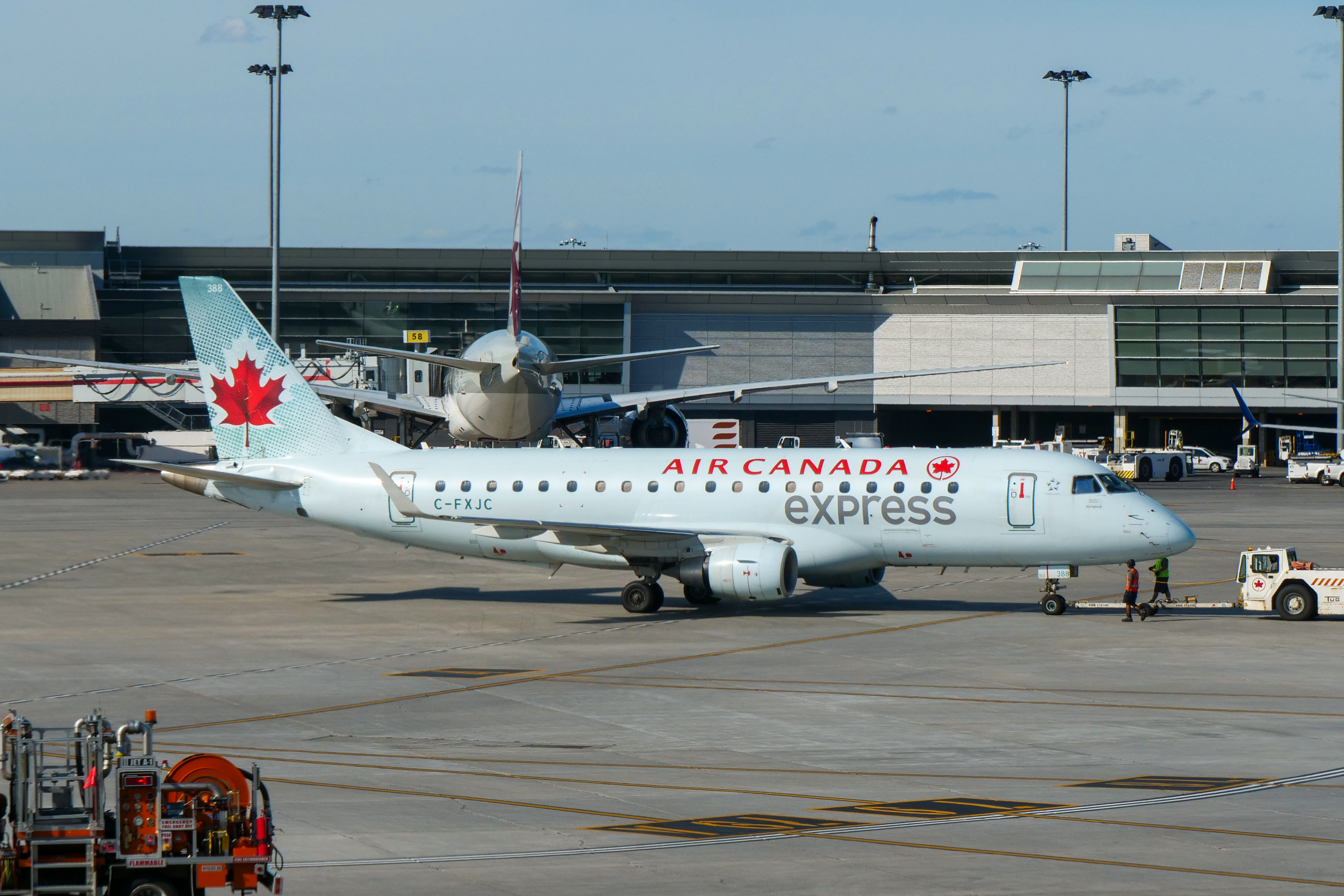
Operating regional feeder services, Air Canada Express is a subsidiary of Air Canada.

Air Canada Express is the brand name of Air Canada's regional feeder service operated by independent carriers Jazz Aviation and PAL Airlines.

==== Air Canada Jetz ====
Launched in 2002, Air Canada Jetz is a charter service targeting sports teams, professional entertainers, and corporations. The Air Canada Jetz fleet consists of Airbus A319 and A320 aircraft in an all business class configuration. In February 2014, Air Canada decided to leave the sports charter business. However, on 17 March 2015, Air Canada announced an agreement with several NHL teams to provide charter services under the Air Canada Jetz brand for six years starting from the 2015–2016 NHL season.

==== Air Canada Rouge ====
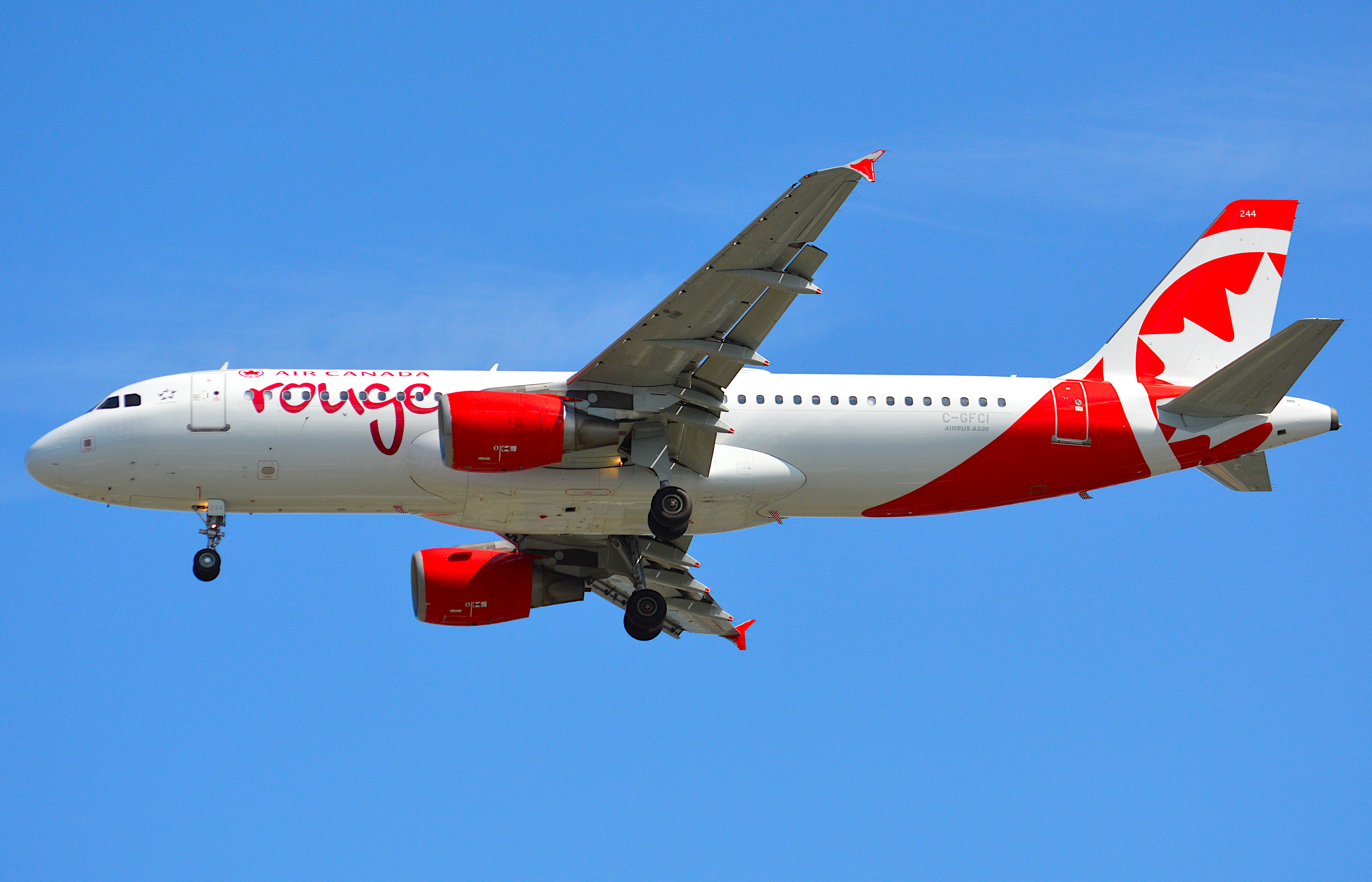
Air Canada Rouge is a subsidiary of Air Canada.

Launched in December 2012, Air Canada Rouge is a subsidiary of Air Canada. Air Canada Rouge serves predominantly leisure destinations in Europe, the Caribbean, South America, Central America, Mexico and the United States using Airbus A319, Airbus A320, and Airbus A321. Air Canada Rouge's former routes to Asia, Europe, and South America were cancelled after the retirement of its Boeing 767-300ER aircraft.

==== Air Canada Vacations ====
Air Canada Vacations is Air Canada's tour operator. All packages include accommodation, Aeroplan Miles and roundtrip airfare aboard Air Canada and/or its Star Alliance partners.

Air Canada Vacations offers Executive Class service on select flights, nonstop flights from major Canadian cities and daily flights to many destinations.

==== Aeroplan ====
Aeroplan is Air Canada's loyalty marketing program operated by Groupe Aeroplan Inc., which was spun off from Air Canada in 2005. Air Canada re-purchased Aeroplan from Aimia Inc in January 2019.

=== Former subsidiaries ===
==== Air Canada Jazz ====
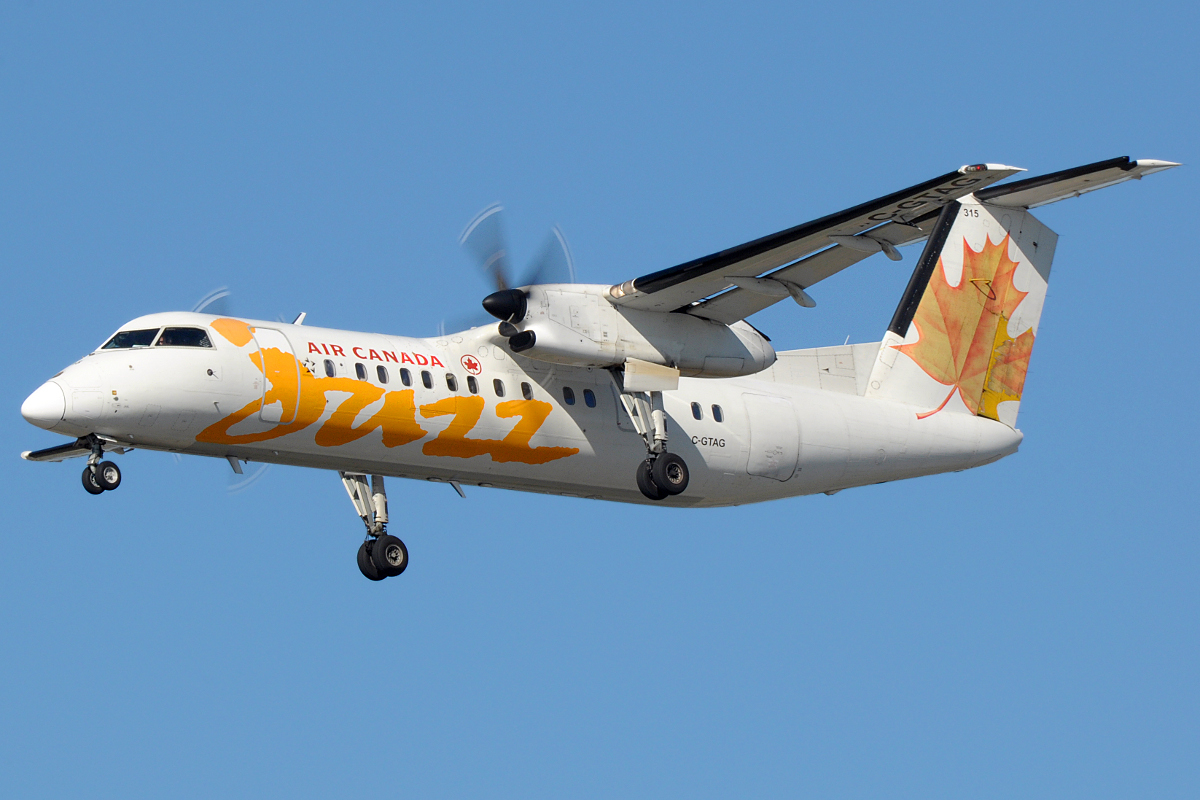
Air Canada Jazz was a former subsidiary that operated as a regional airline. The subsidiary was spun off in 2006, although it continued to use the Air Canada brand until 2011.

In 2001, Air Canada consolidated its wholly owned regional carriers Air BC, Air Nova, Air Ontario, and Canadian Regional Airlines into Air Canada Regional Incorporated. Several of these air carriers had previously operated as an "Air Canada Connector". In 2002, the consolidation was completed with the creation of a new brand, Air Canada Jazz. Air Canada Jazz was spun off in November 2006. ACE Aviation Holdings is no longer a shareholder of Jazz Aviation LP, making it an independent company. Air Canada Jazz was the brand name of Air Canada's main regional product from 2002 to 2011. As of June 2011, the Air Canada Jazz brand is no longer being marketed as all regional operators adopted the Air Canada Express name. Jazz Aviation is the largest of these affiliates, operating 125 aircraft on behalf of Air Canada.

==== Air Canada Tango ====
On 1 November 2001, Air Canada launched Air Canada Tango, designed to offer no-frills service and lower fares using a dedicated fleet of 13 Airbus A320s in an all economy configuration of 159 seats. In Canada, it operated from Toronto to Vancouver, Calgary, Edmonton, Winnipeg, Regina, Saskatoon, Thunder Bay, Ottawa, Montreal, Halifax, Gander and St. John's. In addition, it operated non-stop service between Toronto and Fort Lauderdale, Orlando and Tampa; as well as non-stop service between Montreal and Fort Lauderdale and Orlando. Tango was intended to compete with Canada 3000. The Tango service was dissolved in 2004. Air Canada once called its lowest fare class "Tango". As of 2018, Air Canada has renamed the Tango fare class to Standard fare.

==== Zip ====
In 2002, Air Canada launched a discount airline to compete directly with WestJet on routes in Western Canada. Zip operated ex-Canadian Airlines International 737-200s as a separate airline with its own staff and brightly painted aircraft. It was disbanded in 2004.

== Destinations and hubs ==
=== Hubs ===
Air Canada currently operates three hubs.

- Toronto–Pearson: Air Canada's primary global hub.
- Montréal–Trudeau: secondary hub for the East Coast and principal gateway to France and other international destinations.
- Vancouver: secondary hub for the West Coast and premier Asia-Pacific gateway.

=== Destinations ===
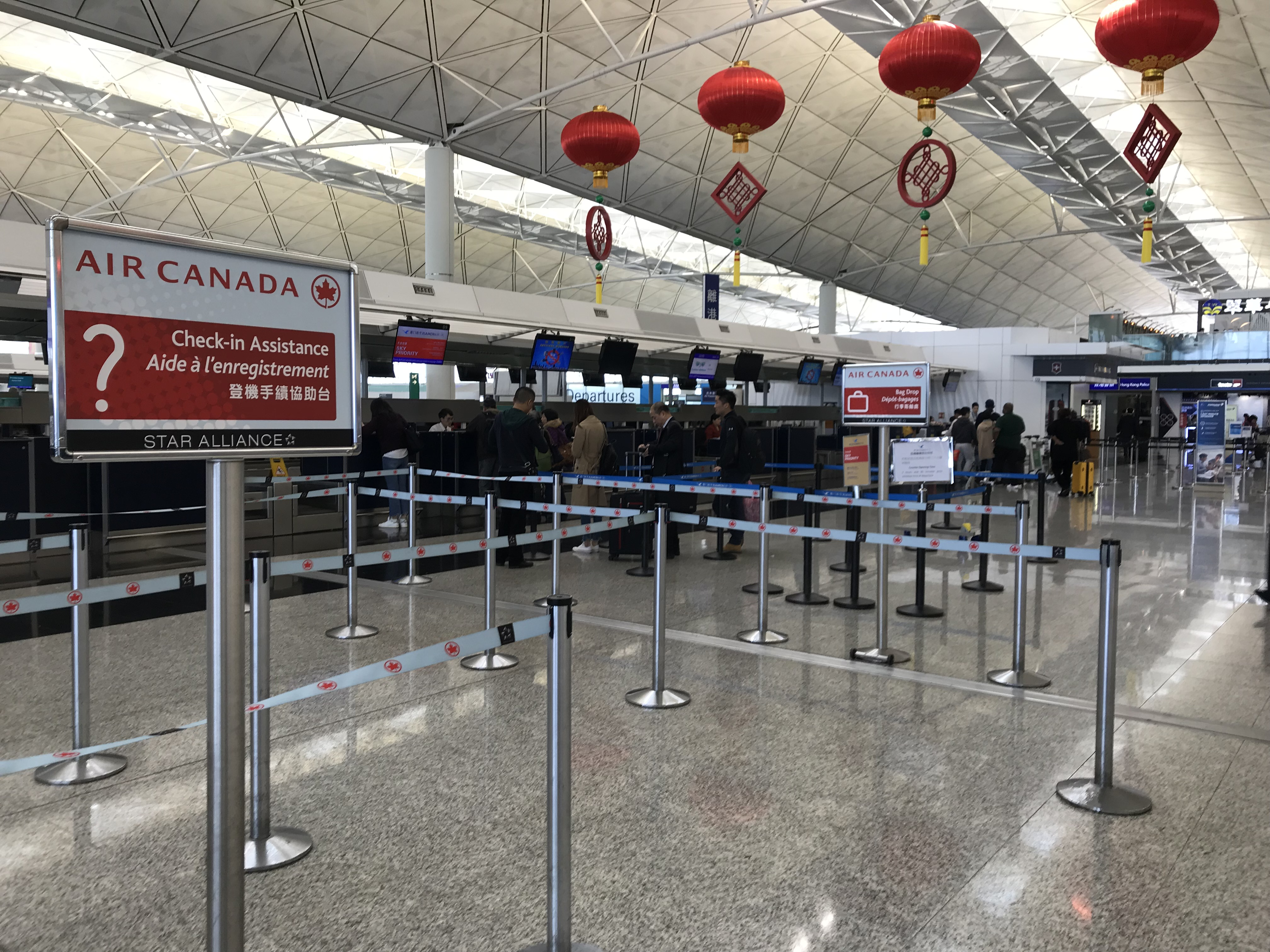
Air Canada's check-in counter at Hong Kong International Airport

As of January 2024, Air Canada flies to 64 domestic destinations and 158 international destinations across Asia, Africa, the Americas, Europe, and Oceania. Along with its regional partners, the carrier serves over 222 destinations in 47 countries, on six continents worldwide.

Air Canada currently flies two fifth freedom flights, São Paulo-Buenos Aires and London Heathrow-Delhi. Air Canada has flown a number of fifth freedom routes (passenger and cargo rights between two non-Canadian destinations) in the past, including: Honolulu–Sydney, London Heathrow–Düsseldorf, Paris–Geneva, Paris–Munich, Paris–Berlin, Frankfurt–Zürich, Zürich–Zagreb, Zürich–Vienna, Zürich–Delhi, Manchester–Brussels, Lisbon–Madrid, Brussels–Prague, London Heathrow–Mumbai, London Heathrow–Nice, London Heathrow–Mumbai–Singapore, Montego Bay–Kingston (KIN), and Santiago–Buenos Aires. However, these were replaced with nonstop routes: Vancouver–Sydney, Toronto–Munich, Toronto–Brussels, Toronto–Zürich, Vancouver–Zürich, Toronto–Vienna, Toronto–Delhi, Vancouver–Delhi, Toronto–Madrid, and Toronto–Mumbai.

=== Joint ventures ===
Air Canada have joint ventures with the following airlines:

- Lufthansa
- United Airlines

Additionally, Air Canada partners with The Landline Company to provide "tarmac-to-tarmac" coach bus connections to and from two hubs and nearby smaller airports or terminals: Toronto–Pearson to Hamilton, Kingston, Muskoka, Niagara, Sarnia, or Kitchener-Waterloo; and Montréal–Trudeau to the Palais des congrès de Montréal convention centre.

=== Codeshare agreements ===
Air Canada codeshares with the following airlines:

- Aegean Airlines
- Aer Lingus
- airBaltic
- Air China
- Air Dolomiti
- Air India
- Air New Zealand
- All Nippon Airways
- Asiana Airlines
- Austrian Airlines
- Avianca
- Azul Brazilian Airlines
- Brussels Airlines
- Cathay Pacific
- Central Mountain Air
- Croatia Airlines
- Deutsche Bahn (railway)
- Discover Airlines
- Edelweiss Air
- Egyptair
- Emirates
- Ethiopian Airlines
- Etihad Airways
- Eurowings
- EVA Air
- Flydubai
- Gol Linhas Aéreas Inteligentes
- KTX (railway)
- ITA Airways
- LOT Polish Airlines
- Lufthansa
- Middle East Airlines
- Renfe (railway)
- Scoot
- Singapore Airlines
- SriLankan Airlines
- Swiss International Air Lines
- TAP Air Portugal
- Thai Airways International
- Turkish Airlines
- United Airlines
- Virgin Australia

=== Interline agreements ===
Air Canada has interline agreements with the following airlines:

- Aer Lingus
- Aegean Airlines
- Aerolíneas Argentinas
- airBaltic
- Air Calédonie
- Air China
- Air Creebec
- Air Dolomiti
- Air India
- Air Mauritius
- Air New Zealand
- All Nippon Airways
- American Airlines
- Asiana Airlines
- Austrian Airlines
- Avianca
- Avianca Costa Rica
- Avianca Ecuador
- Avianca El Salvador
- Azul Brazilian Airlines
- Bamboo Airways
- Bearskin Airlines
- Biman Bangladesh Airlines
- British Airways
- Brussels Airlines
- Canadian North
- Caribbean Airlines
- Cathay Pacific
- Cayman Airways
- Central Mountain Air
- China Airlines
- China Eastern Airlines
- China Southern Airlines
- Copa Airlines
- Croatia Airlines
- Delta Air Lines
- Edelweiss Air
- Egyptair
- Emirates
- Ethiopian Airlines
- Etihad Airways
- Eurowings
- EVA Air
- Fiji Airways
- Garuda Indonesia
- Gol Linhas Aéreas Inteligentes
- Gulf Air
- Hawaiian Airlines
- Hong Kong Airlines
- Iberia
- Icelandair
- Japan Airlines
- Jeju Air
- Jetstar
- Jetstar Japan
- Juneyao Airlines
- Kenya Airways
- KLM
- Korean Air
- Kuwait Airways
- LATAM Airlines Group
- LIAT
- LOT Polish Airlines
- Lufthansa
- Luxair
- Malaysia Airlines
- Olympic Air
- Oman Air
- Pakistan International Airlines
- Pascan Aviation
- Pegasus Airlines
- Philippine Airlines
- PAL Airlines
- Qatar Airways
- Qantas
- Royal Air Maroc
- Royal Jordanian
- Saudia
- Scandinavian Airlines
- Shenzhen Airlines
- Singapore Airlines
- South African Airways
- SriLankan Airlines
- Swiss International Air Lines
- TAP Air Portugal
- Thai Airways International
- Tunisair
- Turkish Airlines
- United Airlines
- Vietnam Airlines
- Virgin Atlantic
- Virgin Australia
- Widerøe

== Fleet ==
Air Canada logo

Air Canada operates 210 mainline passenger aircraft, a mix of Airbus and Boeing narrow-body and wide-body jets. This list excludes aircraft from subsidiaries Air Canada Express, Air Canada Jetz, Air Canada Rouge and Air Canada Cargo.

== Services ==
Air Canada has three classes of service, Business/Signature, Premium Economy, and Economy. On most long-haul international and short-haul routes operated by widebody aircraft, Signature Class, Premium Economy, and Economy Class are offered; most short-haul and domestic routes feature Business Class and Economy Class. All mainline seats feature AVOD (Audio Video On Demand) and mood lighting. Air Canada Express features Business Class and Economy Class, on CRJ900 and Embraer E175 aircraft; all other Air Canada Express aircraft have one-class economy cabins. All narrowbody mainline aircraft, as well as Air Canada Express CRJ900 and Embraer E175 aircraft have onboard Wi-Fi installed, which is also being installed on all widebody aircraft.

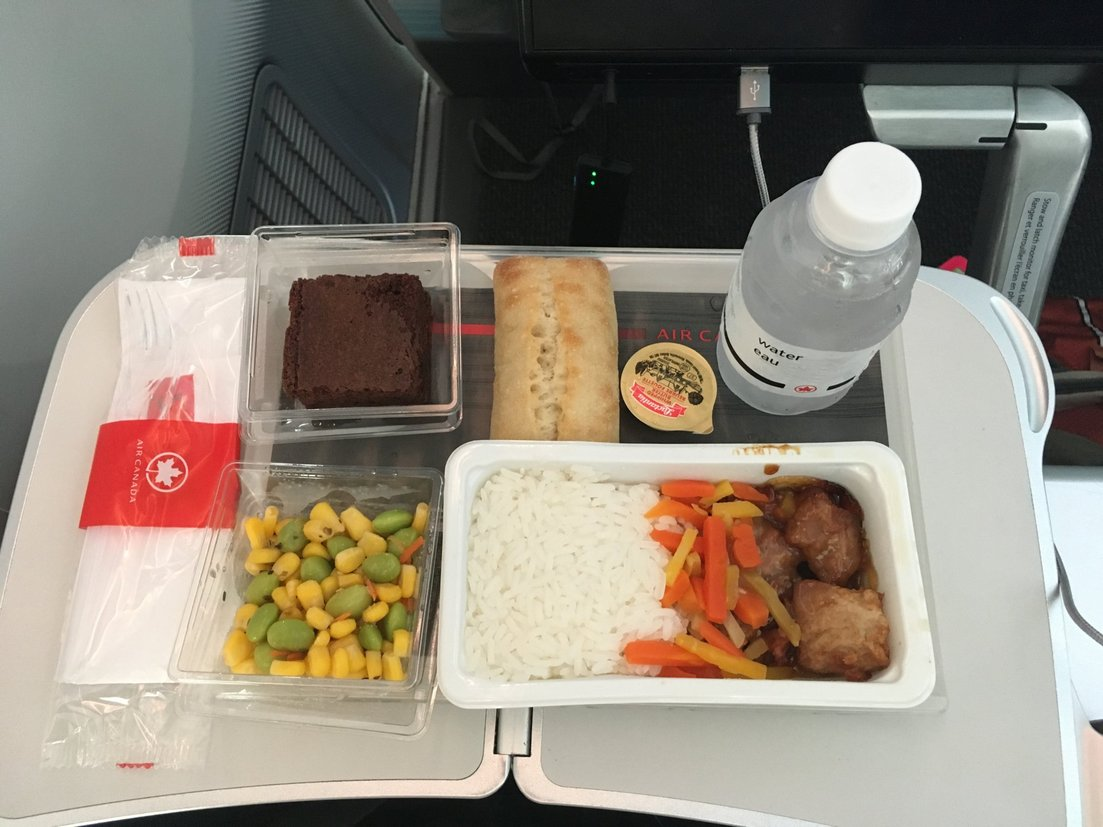
An Air Canada meal served in economy class

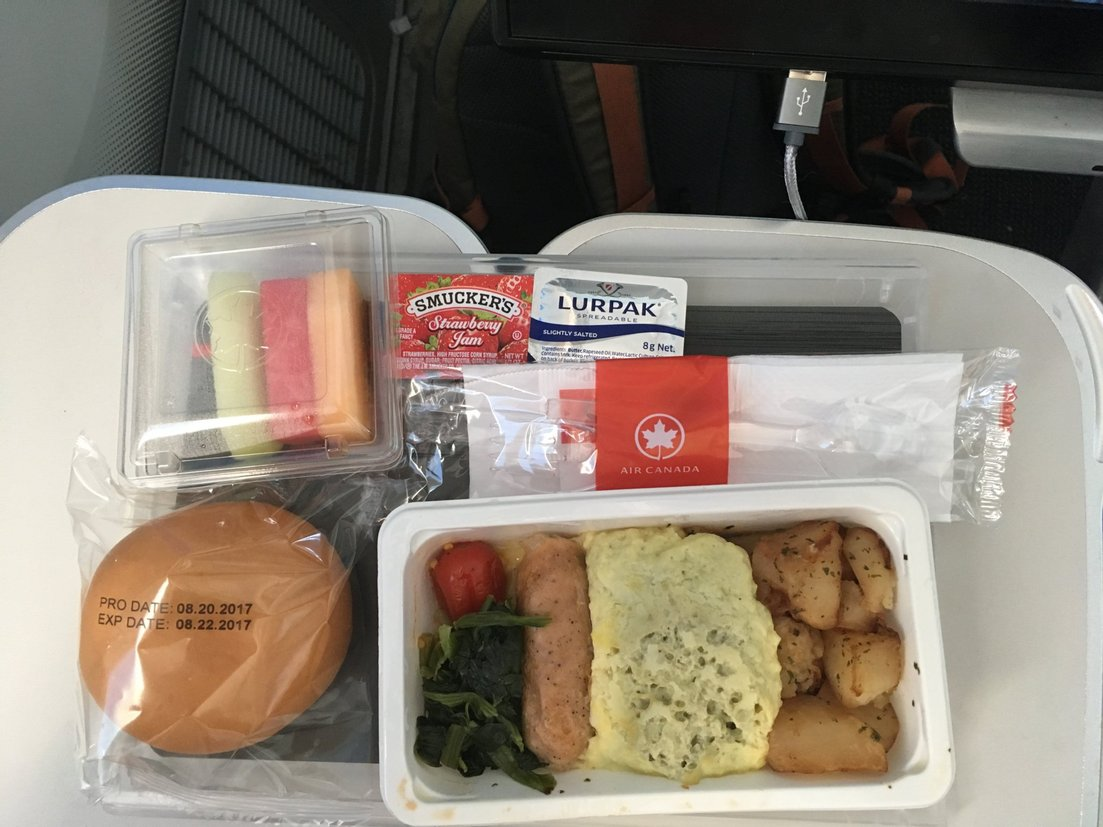
Breakfast, also from economy class

Starting in 2025, Air Canada, in partnership with Bell Canada, will roll out fast and free Wi-Fi to Aeroplan members on Wi-Fi-equipped planes flying within North America, Mexico, and the Caribbean. Air Canada said about 85% of its fleet will be covered. It plans to roll it out to its international fleet starting in 2026.

In the spring of 1987, Air Canada enacted no-smoking flights between Canada and New York City as a test. After a survey reported that 96% of passengers supported the smoking ban, Air Canada extended the ban to other flights.

=== Cabin crew ===
On 9 February 2017, a new uniform scheme coinciding with Canada's 150th and Air Canada's 80th anniversaries was unveiled. Air Canada partnered with Vancouver-born fashion designer Christopher Bates to design the new uniforms which incorporate a base colour of black or grey with red lettering and the famous maple leaf.

Between 2004 and 2017, Air Canada uniforms used a midnight blue colour. The uniforms were designed by Canadian fashion designer Debbie Shuchat. At a presentation in the Toronto Airport hangar, Celine Dion helped the newly solvent airline debut its new image.

== Frequent flyer program ==
Aeroplan is Air Canada's frequent flyer rewards program, both allowing for points collection and spending, as well as status and rewards as an Air Canada customer. After Air Canada and Aeroplan changed the division of points collection and redemption, Air Canada introduced an internal rewards program, Altitude. The two programs operate in conjunction.

In May 2017, Air Canada announced it plans to launch a new loyalty program to replace Aeroplan and Altitude in 2020. On 10 January 2019, Air Canada re-acquired Aeroplan from Aimia. In 2020, Air Canada Altitude and Aeroplan merged, with Aeroplan as the surviving entity.

=== Air Canada Altitude ===
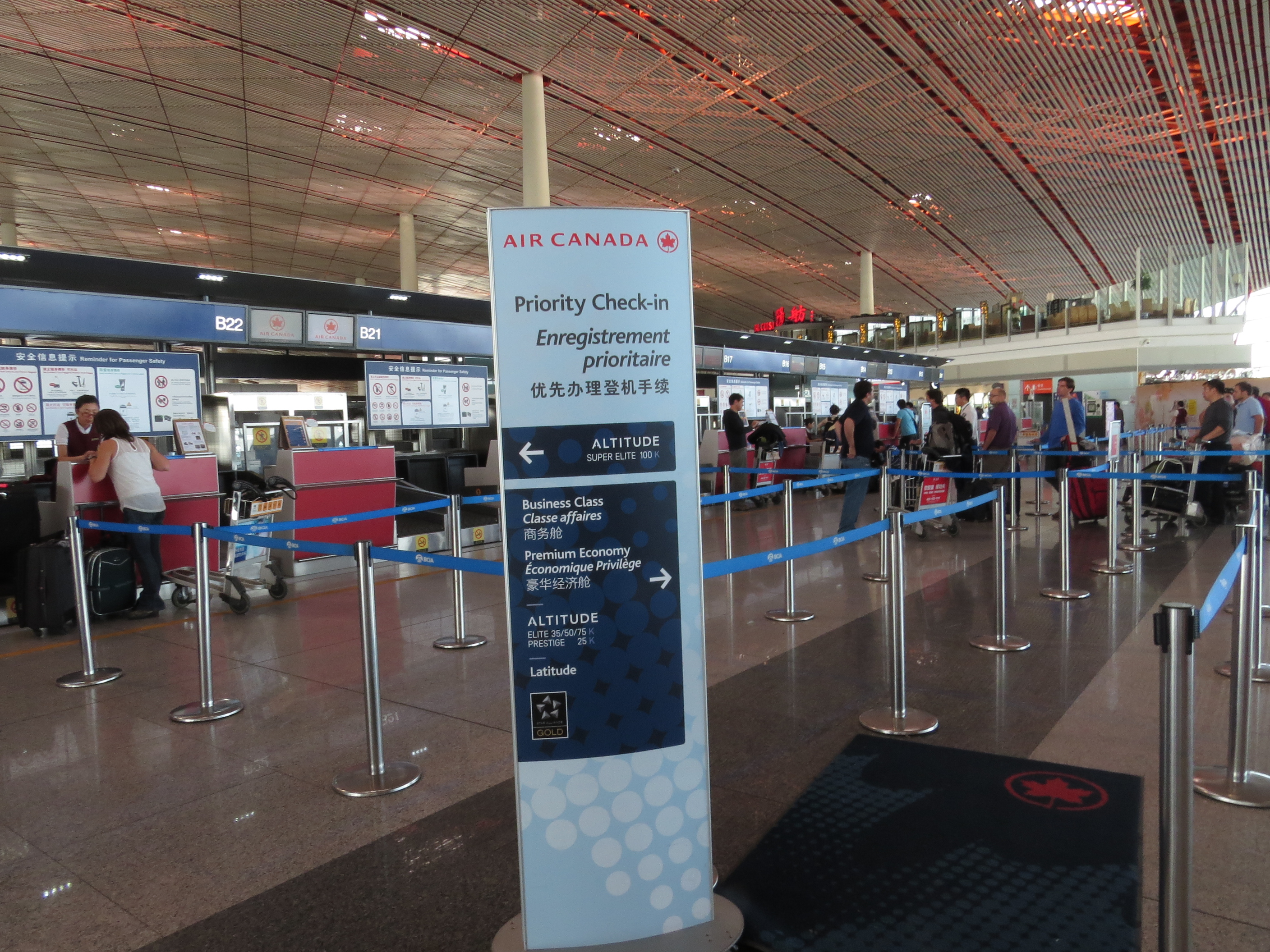
A priority check-in queue at Beijing Capital International Airport for members of "Air Canada Altitude", the airline's frequent flyers program

On 20 September 2012, Air Canada unveiled its new frequent flyer status program named "Air Canada Altitude" to supplement Aeroplan. Aeroplan remained the frequent flyer rewards program, collecting miles which can be "spent", whereas status level is determined by Altitude standing.

There are five levels of membership in Air Canada's Altitude Program: Basic, Prestige 25K, Elite 35K, Elite 50K, Elite 75K and Super Elite 100K. The latter three are called "Top Tier" membership levels and provide travel benefits such as upgrades, lounge access, priority services (e.g., check-in, luggage handling), and bonuses when earning miles through air travel. In order to qualify for these levels, a member must earn, through flight activities, a certain number of miles or a certain number of segments and spending some level of money. Altitude refers to these as Altitude Qualifying Miles (AQM), Segments (AQS), and Dollars (AQD).

Prestige members and Altitude Elite 35 K receive Star Alliance Silver status, while Elite 50K, Elite 75K, and Super Elite 100K members receive Star Alliance Gold status.

Air Canada Status Miles are calculated on an annual basis to determine Altitude Membership Status for the following benefit year (1 March through 28 February). At the 35K and above levels, that level of status is granted when achieved, for the remainder of the current year, as well as for the next year.

This coincides with the alliance with Star Alliance, and this can give Star Alliance Gold passengers access to any Star Alliance lounge and discounts or upgrades on another Star Alliance member.

On 8 November 2020, Air Canada Altitude renamed as Aeroplan Elite Status. Altitude Qualifying Miles (AQM), Segments (AQS), and Dollars (AQD) have been replaced by Status Qualifying Miles (SQM), Segments (SQS), and Dollars (SQD).

== Accidents and incidents ==
Date	Flight no.	Description
13 June 1964	3277	Vickers Viscount registration CF-THT was damaged beyond economical repair when it crash-landed at Toronto Airport after the failure of two engines on approach.
19 May 1967	—N/a	McDonnell Douglas DC-8-54F CF-TJM crashed and burned on a training flight while making a three-engine landing at Ottawa, Ontario. All three crew members were killed. There were no passengers on the flight.
11 September 1968	303	A Vickers Viscount was hijacked by Charles Lavern Beasley, a Texas native and activist, who demanded that the plane be taken to Cuba. It made a successful emergency landing in Montreal, with no injuries reported. It was the first hijacking of its kind in Canadian history.
7 April 1969	—N/a	Vickers Viscount registration CF-THK was damaged beyond economic repair by a fire which occurred on takeoff from Sept-Îles Airport. The aircraft landed back at Sept-Îles, but one passenger was killed in the fire.
1 March 1970	106	Vickers Viscount CF-THY collided in mid-air with Ercoupe 415 CF-SHN on approach to Vancouver International Airport. The Ercoupe pilot was killed.
5 July 1970	621	McDonnell Douglas DC-8-63 registration CF-TIW exploded from a fuel line rupture caused by engine 4 striking the runway in Toronto, Ontario, during a landing attempt. All 109 passengers/crew were killed.
21 June 1973	890	McDonnell Douglas DC-8-53, registration CF-TIJ caught fire and was burnt out during refuelling at Terminal 2, Toronto Pearson International Airport, Ontario; no fatalities.
26 June 1978	189	McDonnell Douglas DC-9-32, registration CF-TLV overran the runway in Toronto after a blown tire aborted the takeoff. Two of the 107 people on board were killed.
17 September 1979	680	McDonnell Douglas DC-9-32, registration C-FTLU left Logan International Airport in Boston, Massachusetts for Yarmouth, Nova Scotia as Flight 680. Approximately 14 minutes after takeoff, the entire tailcone section of the aircraft separated resulting in rapid decompression at an altitude of 25,000 feet (7,600 m), leaving a large hole in the rear fuselage. A beverage cart and other items in the cabin were blown out of the aircraft over the Atlantic Ocean, but there were no fatalities or significant injuries. The aircraft safely returned to Boston. Fatigue cracks were determined to be the cause. This same aircraft would be destroyed by a fire nearly four years later on 2 June 1983 as Air Canada Flight 797.
2 June 1982	—N/a	McDonnell Douglas DC-9-32 registration C-FTLY exploded during a maintenance period in Montreal, Quebec; no fatalities.
2 June 1983	797	McDonnell Douglas DC-9-32 C-FTLU had an electrical fire in the aft lavatory during flight, resulting in an emergency landing at Cincinnati/Northern Kentucky International Airport. During the emergency evacuation, the sudden influx of oxygen caused a flash fire throughout the cabin, resulting in the deaths of 23 of the 41 passengers, including Canadian folk singer Stan Rogers. All five crew members survived. The captain was the last person to exit the aircraft. This incident was also featured as "Fire Flight" of Canadian television series Mayday season 4 episode 3 (known as "Fiery Landing" of Air Emergency in the US, Air Crash Investigation in the UK and Australia).
23 July 1983	143	Boeing 767-200 C-GAUN glided to an emergency landing in Gimli after running out of fuel 12,300 metres (40,400 ft) above Red Lake, Ontario. Some people suffered minor injuries during the evacuation due to the steep angle of the escape slides at the rear of the aircraft, caused by the collapse of the nose gear. This incident was the subject of the TV movie, Falling from the Sky: Flight 174 and the book, Freefall, by William Hoffer. This incident was also featured on the National Geographic Channel and Discovery Channel series Mayday season 5 episode 2.
16 December 1997	646	Air Canada Flight 646 departed Toronto-Lester B. Pearson International Airport, Ontario, at 9:24 PM eastern standard time on a scheduled flight to Fredericton, New Brunswick. On arrival, the Canadair CRJ100 aircraft, registration C-FSKI, experienced an unstabilized approach in poor visibility and stalled aerodynamically during a late go-around attempt. The aircraft skidded 2,100 feet (640 m) from the point of touchdown and hit a tree. An evacuation was conducted; however, seven passengers were trapped in the aircraft until rescued. Of the 39 passengers and 3 crew members, 9 were seriously injured and the rest received minor or no injuries. The accident occurred at 11:48 PM Atlantic standard time. Air Canada was heavily criticized in the media over its employees allegedly entering the crash site and removing the aircraft decals identifying its operator without the permission of the authorities.
29 March 2015	624	Air Canada Flight 624 was an Airbus A320 C-FTJP flying from Toronto Pearson International Airport to Halifax Stanfield International Airport. After 15 minutes in a holding pattern due to a severe winter storm and poor visibility, during approach in Halifax, the plane impacted the runway approach lights and power lines knocking out power and communications at the airport. It then impacted the ground 300m short of the runway, continuing on to impact the localizer antenna array, and breaking off its landing gear. The plane then touched down a second time and slid down the runway, losing one of its engines. All 133 passengers and five crew evacuated and survived. 23 people were sent to the hospital with non-life-threatening injuries. Due to substantial damage, the aircraft was written off.
7 July 2017	759	At the conclusion of the regularly scheduled international passenger flight from Toronto to San Francisco, Air Canada Flight 759 nearly landed on a taxiway which already had four fully loaded and fuelled aircraft holding short for takeoff. A retired pilot stated the runway confusion that almost happened "probably came close to the greatest aviation disaster in history" as five aircraft and over 1,000 passengers were at imminent risk.

== See also ==
- ACE Aviation Holdings – Canadian holding company
- Air Canada Rouge – Low-cost airline of Canada
- Air Transat – Airline in Canada
- Air transport in Canada
- Chorus Aviation – Canadian holding company
- Jazz Aviation LP – Regional airline of Canada
- List of airlines of Canada
- List of airports in Canada
- List of companies of Canada
- Transportation in Canada
