= Claude Taylor (transportation executive) =

Canadian transportation executive

Claude Taylor OC
- Born: Claude Ivan Taylor; May 20, 1925; Salisbury, New Brunswick, Canada
- Died: April 23, 2015 (aged 89); Montreal, Quebec, Canada
- Education: McGill University
- Occupations: Corporate executive; accountant

Claude Ivan Taylor OC (May 20, 1925 – April 23, 2015) was a Canadian transportation executive. He was the President and CEO of Air Canada.

Born in Salisbury, New Brunswick, he graduated as a Registered Industrial Accountant from McGill University in 1953. He started at Air Canada in 1949 as a reservation agent and would become president and CEO from 1976 to 1984. From 1984 to 1992, he was chairman of the board. He was president and CEO again from 1990 to 1992. He was president of the International Air Transport Association from 1979 to 1980.

In 2006, he was made an Officer of the Order of Canada for having "turned Air Canada into a world leader in air transportation and, through his leadership of professional organizations at home and abroad". In 1985, he was inducted into Canada's Aviation Hall of Fame. He has received honorary degrees from the University of New Brunswick and McMaster University. He was also a Commander of the Order of St. John.

Business positions
Preceded by None	CEO and President of Air Canada; 1976-1984	Succeeded by Pierre Jean Jeanniot
Preceded by Pierre Jean Jeanniot	CEO and President of Air Canada; 1990-1992	Succeeded by Hollis L. Harris
