= Călin Rovinescu =

Canadian aviation executive

Călin Rovinescu CM
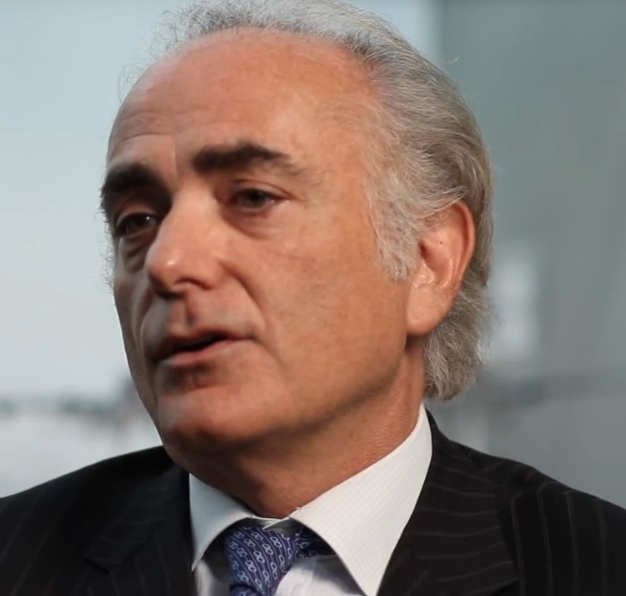
- Rovinescu in 2015

14th Chancellor of the University of Ottawa
- In office November 9, 2015 – November 8, 2022
- President: Jacques Frémont
- Preceded by: Michaëlle Jean
- Succeeded by: Claudette Commanda

Personal details
- Born: September 17, 1956 (age 70) Bucharest, Romania
- Education: McGill University; Université de Montréal (LL.L, 1978); University of Ottawa (LL.B, 1980)

Călin Rovinescu CM (born September 16, 1955) is a Romanian-Canadian lawyer and aviation executive. Rovinescu has been the chairman of CAE since February 2025, and served as the president and chief executive officer of Air Canada from April 2009 to February 2021.

== Early life and education ==
Rovinescu was born in Bucharest, Romania. He emigrated to Canada with his parents and sister when he was five years old. In 1974, he received his CEGEP (DEC) degree. In 1978, he graduated from the Université de Montréal where he received his LL.L. (Civil Law). In 1980, Rovinescu graduated from the University of Ottawa where he received his LL.B. (Common Law).

== Career ==
Before joining Air Canada, Rovinescu was the managing partner of Montreal law firm Stikeman Elliott LLP, and for over 20 years practiced in the areas of corporate finance and mergers and acquisitions. While a lawyer at Stikeman Elliott LLP, Rovinescu served as lead external counsel on Air Canada's privatization and public offering in 1988 and continued advising the airline on significant transactions and events thereafter. He is a member of the Quebec and Ontario Bar Associations.

Rovinescu first joined Air Canada in 2000 as its Executive Vice President of Corporate Development and Strategy and served as its Chief Restructuring Officer during its 2003–2004 restructuring.

Between 2004 and returning to Air Canada in 2009, Rovinescu was a co-founder and principal of independent investment bank Genuity Capital Markets, which subsequently merged with Canaccord Capital to form Canaccord Genuity Group.

Rovinescu was elected chairman of the Star Alliance chief executive board, the controlling body of Star Alliance, the world's largest global airline alliance, and served in that role from 2012 to 2016. He has also been a member of the board of governors of the International Air Transport Association, a global trade association representing some 240 airlines since 2010. He served as chairman of IATA from June 2014 to June 2015.

He serves on the board of directors of BCE Inc., Canada's largest telecom and media company and of the Bank of Nova Scotia, Canada’s third largest bank. He is a Senior Advisor to Brookfield Asset Management, one of the world's largest asset managers and of Teneo, a global public affairs advisory to CEOs. He previously served on the Board of directors of the Business Council of Canada (BCC), an organization composed of the CEOs of Canada's largest enterprises, representing all sectors of the Canadian economy.

Rovinescu is broadly credited with having saved Air Canada from bankruptcy and having set it on a course for sustainable profitability, better labour relations and continued success. In the ten years following his appointment, Air Canada's shares had appreciated more than 4,000% and the airline had achieved record revenues, record profitability and carried a record number of passengers. Its common shares had the greatest share price appreciation of all companies listed on the Toronto Stock Exchange over the decade ended December 31, 2019. It has expanded dramatically and serves 220 destinations on all six inhabited continents. During his tenure, Air Canada was recognized by Skytrax as the Best Airline in North America in eight out of ten years, and as the only four star network carrier in North America. In addition, it won numerous other awards including Air Transport World's 2018 Eco Airline of the Year and is one of Canada's Top Employers.

On October 3, 2019, together with his wife Elaine, he announced the creation of the Rovinescu Admission Scholarships for new Canadians, to benefit students at both the University of Ottawa and Université de Montréal through a gift of $2M, to be divided equally between the two institutions. The Rovinescu Scholarships will provide first-generation Canadians or children of immigrants, with the opportunity to pursue a bachelor’s or professional degree designation at either university.

Since November 9, 2015, he was named 14th Chancellor of the University of Ottawa, replacing former Governor General Michaëlle Jean. He was replaced by Algonquin Elder Claudette Commanda in 2022.

== Awards and honours ==
The Globe and Mail's Report on Business magazine named Rovinescu Canada's best CEO of 2013 and again in 2019, the only two-time winner of this award. In addition, in 2016, he was named Canada's Outstanding CEO of the Year by Financial Post Magazine, the country's preeminent award for chief executives, founded in 1990 to identify and recognize exemplary leadership and achievement in business.

In 2018, Flight Global presented Rovinescu with the Global Executive Leadership Award at the 2018 Airline Strategy Awards in London, England, the airline industry's leading recognition for CEOs of global carriers. He was recognized for his "strong and unwavering leadership of Air Canada."

Also in 2018, Rovinescu was recognized with the CEO lifetime achievement Award at the Airline Passenger Experience Association (APEX) expo in Boston, and named the first CEO from the Americas to be presented with the Award by APEX.

In 2019, Tourisme Montreal presented Rovinescu with their highest honour, the Tribute Award, for his contribution to the development of Montreal and the Conseil du Patronat inducted him into its Entrepreneurs' Club, amongst the significant leaders of Quebec business. He was inducted as a Companion into the Canadian Business Hall of Fame at a virtual induction ceremony which occurred in June 2021.

Rovinescu has been awarded honorary doctorate degrees from six institutions: Université de Montréal, University of Ottawa, Concordia University in Montreal, University of Windsor, Pepperdine University in California, and Politehnica University of Bucharest.

Rovinescu was appointed a member of the Order of Canada for promoting the associated charitable causes and organizations of Canada's largest airline, and for his leadership in spearheading humanitarian relief following several natural disasters.

Academic offices
Preceded by Michaëlle Jean	14th Chancellor of the University of Ottawa; 2015–2022	Succeeded by Claudette Commanda
Business positions
Preceded by Montie Brewer	President and CEO of Air Canada; 2009–2021	Succeeded by Michael Rousseau
