= Air Canada Jetz =

Canadian airline

IATA	ICAO	Call sign
AC	ACA	AIR CANADA
- Founded: October 31, 2001; 25 years ago
- AOC #: 5262 (shared with Air Canada)
- Alliance: Star Alliance (affiliate)
- Fleet size: 5
- Parent company: Air Canada
- Headquarters: Montreal, Quebec, Canada
- Website: https://www.aircanada.com/ca/en/aco/home/book/charters.html#/

Air Canada Jetz is a Canadian charter airline headquartered in Montreal and a wholly owned subsidiary of Air Canada. Established and starting operations on October 31, 2001, it operates a premium business service for corporate clients and professional sports teams. The airline was originally headed by Robert Perrault, former president of Air Alliance.

== Charters ==
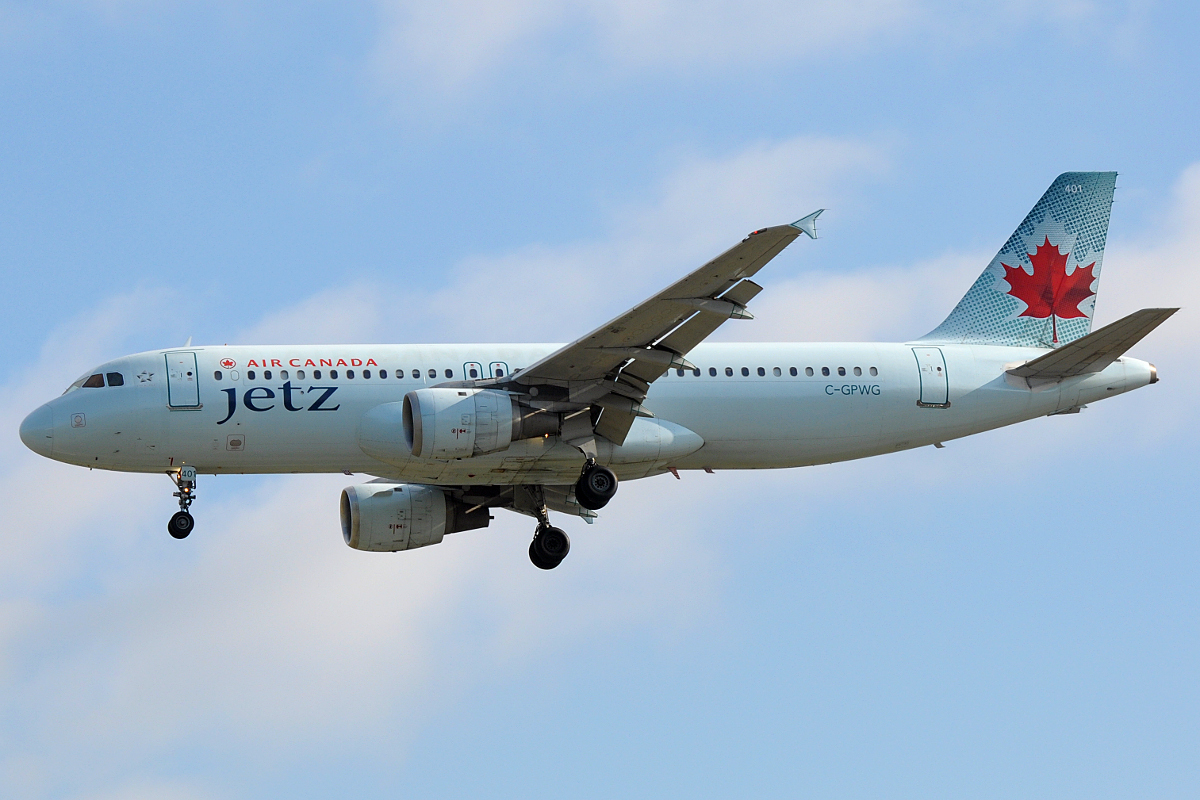
Air Canada Jetz Airbus A320

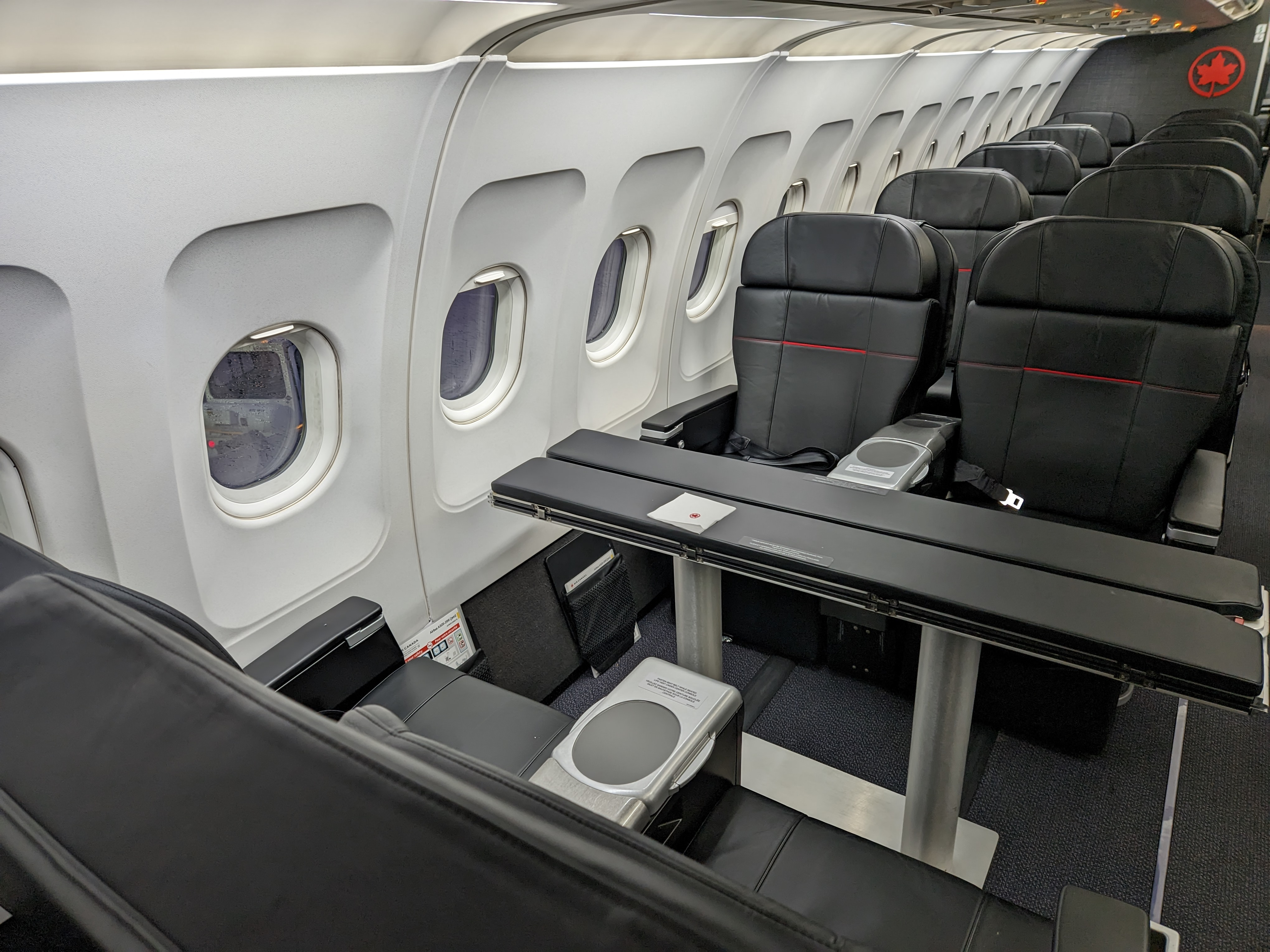
Refurbished cabin on an Air Canada Jetz A320

=== Sports teams ===
Jetz is the official carrier of the majority of the National Hockey League (NHL), which includes all seven Canadian teams and ten American teams.

On March 31, 2014, the Ottawa Citizen reported that Air Canada "has made a decision to exit this segment of the market." However, service has not been terminated, and on March 17, 2015, the company announced a 6-year contract with several NHL teams starting from the 2015–16 season.

=== Others ===
In 2005–2006, Jetz carried U2 on their Vertigo Tour, and again in 2009 on their U2 360 Tour. Jetz also carried The Rolling Stones on their North American tour until the band felt the Jetz Aircraft was not large enough and transferred to a Boeing 747-400. Jetz has carried many other high-profiled rock bands (Bruce Springsteen, Phil Collins, The Spice Girls) and business executives.

During the 2004, 2006 and 2008 federal elections, NDP Leader Jack Layton's tour was carried by Jetz.

During the COVID-19 pandemic, all of Jetz began operating commercial flights from Toronto to Montreal and Ottawa starting on June 1.

During the 2021 federal election, both Liberal Party of Canada leader Justin Trudeau and Conservative Party of Canada leader Erin O'Toole's campaign tours chartered Air Canada Jetz aircraft.

== Fleet ==
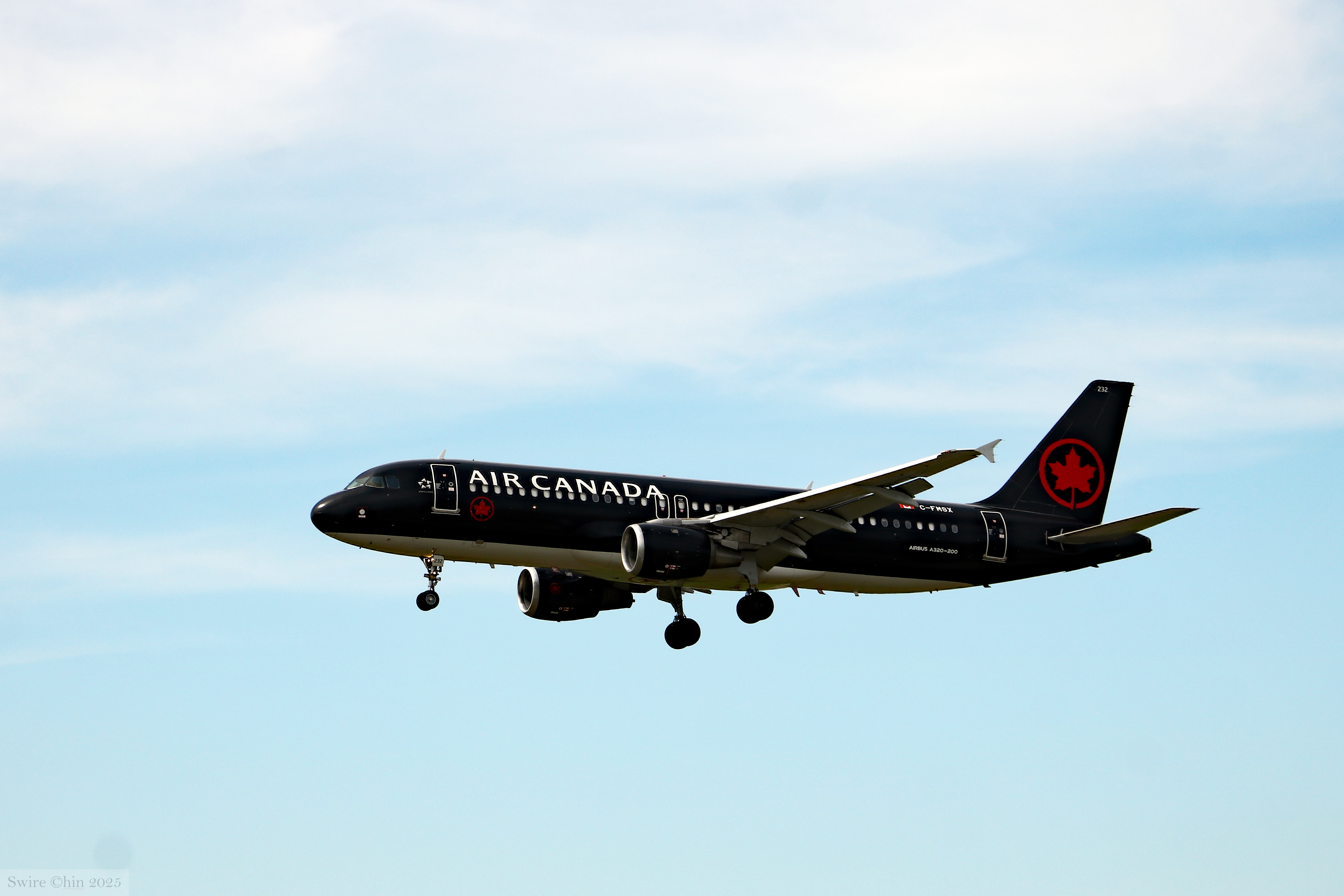
An Air Canada Jetz Airbus A320-200

As of September 2026, Air Canada Jetz operates five Airbus A320 aircraft (two of which are in an all-black livery) configured with 70 business class seats.

Aircraft	In service	Passengers	Notesf
Airbus A320-200	5	70	All business class layout. Registrations: C-FKOJ, C-FGJI, C-FKPT, C-FMSX, C-FNVV.
Total	5		
