= Air Canada fleet =

List of aircraft operated by Air Canada

Air Canada logo

Air Canada operates 210 mainline passenger aircraft, a mix of Airbus and Boeing narrow-body and wide-body jets. This list excludes aircraft from subsidiaries Air Canada Express, Air Canada Jetz, Air Canada Rouge and Air Canada Cargo.

== Current fleet ==
As of April 2026, Air Canada operates the following mainline aircraft:

Air Canada mainline fleet
Aircraft	In service	Orders	Passengers				Notes
Aircraft	In service	Orders	J	W	Y	Total	Notes
Airbus A220-300	47	18	12	—	125	137	Deliveries until 2027. 5 options exercised on December 20, 2024. Order with 10 options.
Airbus A320-200	16	—	12	—	156	168	8 aircraft to be retrofitted by the end of 2025. 5 to be transferred from Air Canada Rouge by 2027.
Airbus A321-200	18	13	—	16	180	196	13 aircraft to be transferred from Air Canada Rouge by 2027.
Airbus A321-200	3	13	—	8	176	184	Transferred from EVA Air with its configuration.
Airbus A321XLR	6	24	14	—	168	182	Deliveries until 2029.
Airbus A330-300	20	—	32	24	241	297	
Airbus A330-300	20	—	—	30	255	285	
Airbus A350-1000	—	8	TBA				Deliveries begin in 2030. Order with 8 options.
Boeing 737 MAX 8	35	—	16	—	153	169	To be transferred to Air Canada Rouge through 2026.
Boeing 737 MAX 8	35	—	—	—	189	189	To be transferred to Air Canada Rouge through 2026.
Boeing 777-200LR	6	—	40	24	236	300	To be retrofitted with new cabin standard starting in 2029.
Boeing 777-300ER	19	—	40	24	336	400	To be retrofitted with new cabin standard starting in 2029.
Boeing 777-300ER	19	—	28	24	388	440	To be retrofitted with new cabin standard starting in 2029.
Boeing 787-8	8	—	20	21	214	255	To be retrofitted with new cabin standard starting in 2029.
Boeing 787-9	32	—	30	21	247	298	To be retrofitted with new cabin standard starting in 2029.
Boeing 787-10	—	14	42	28	262	332	Deliveries from 2026 until 2030. Order with 12 options.
Heart ES-30	—	30	TBA			30	Deliveries begin in 2029.
Total	210	107					

=== Gallery ===
Hover over each photo to view label detail

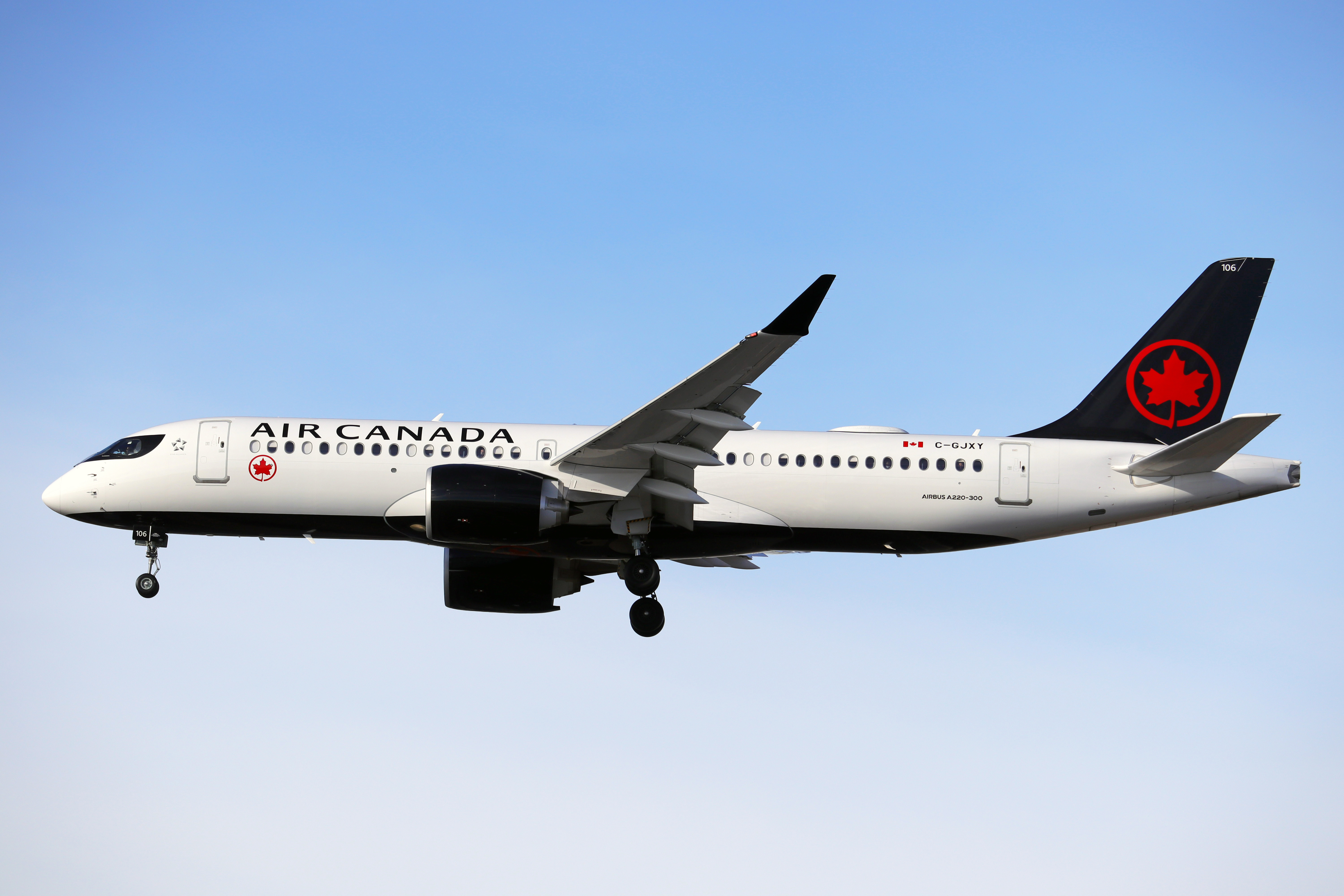
Airbus A220-300

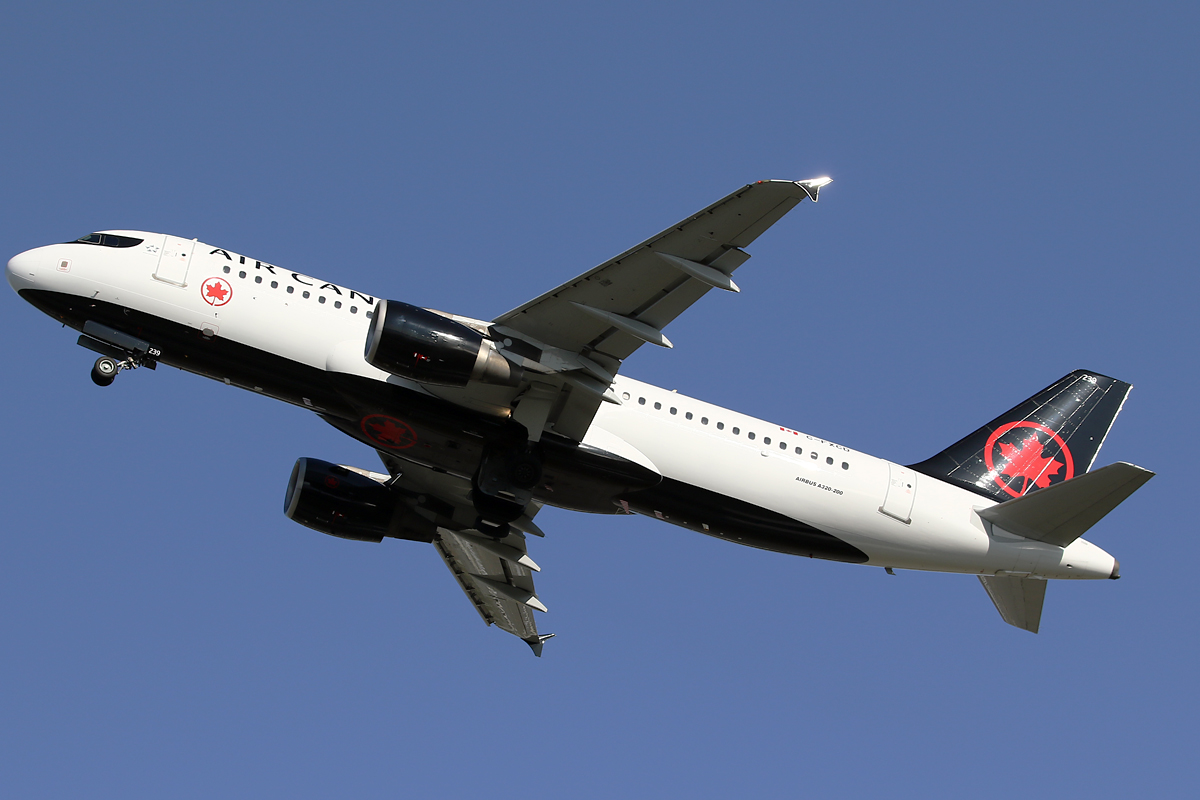
Airbus A320-200

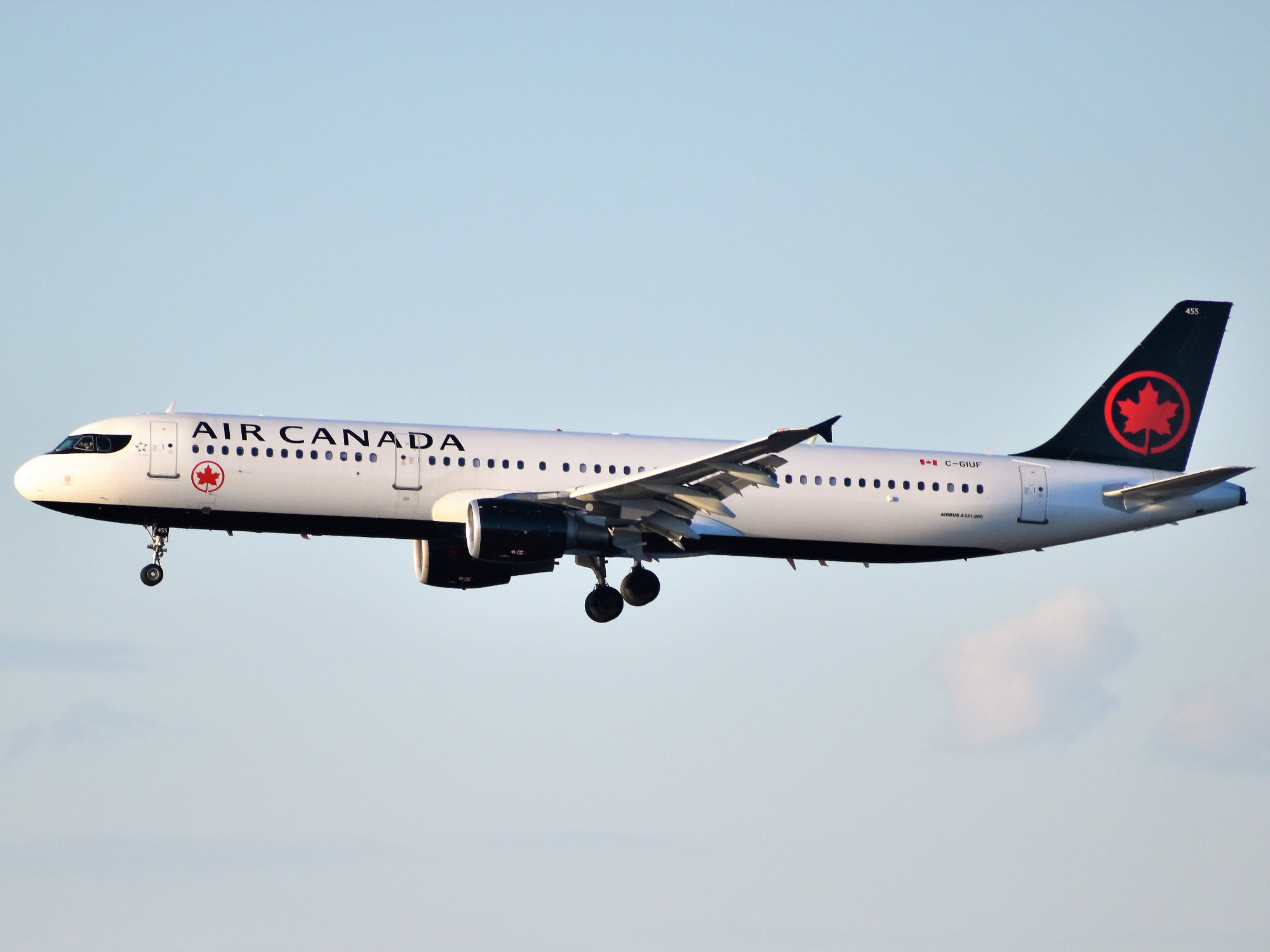
Airbus A321-200

Airbus A321XLR

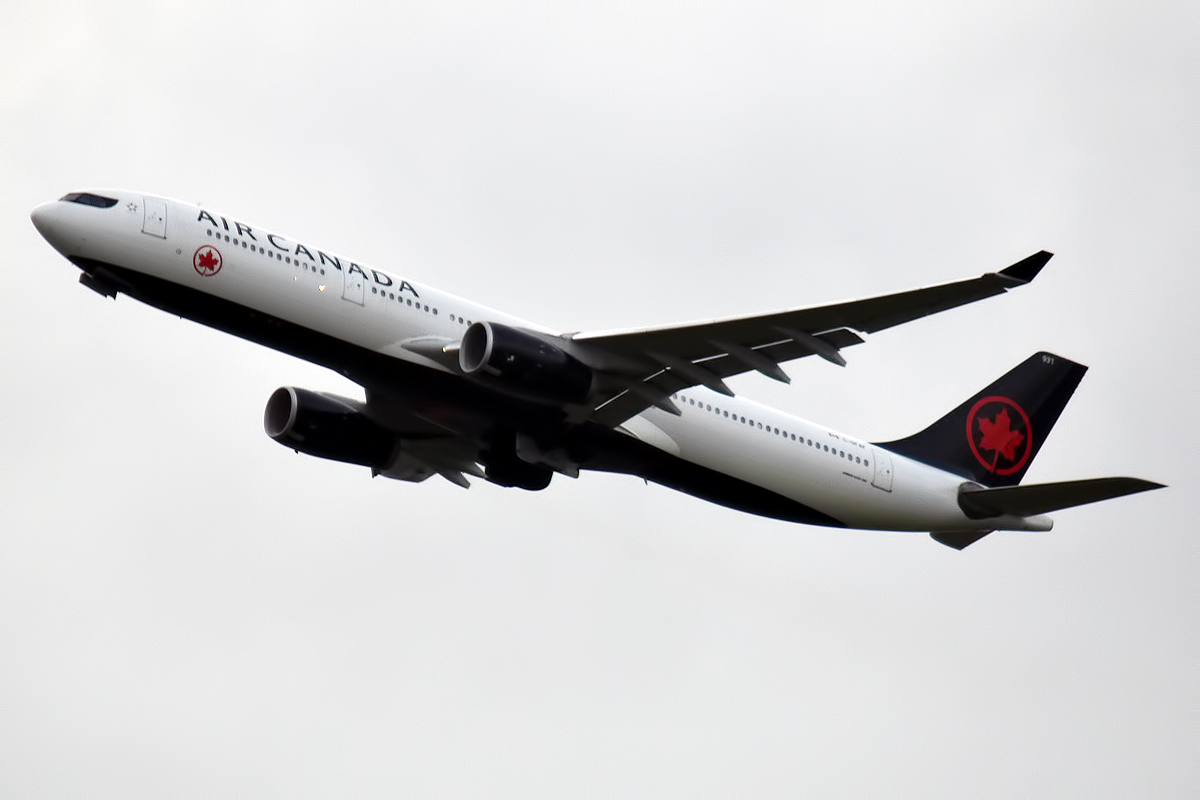
Airbus A330-300

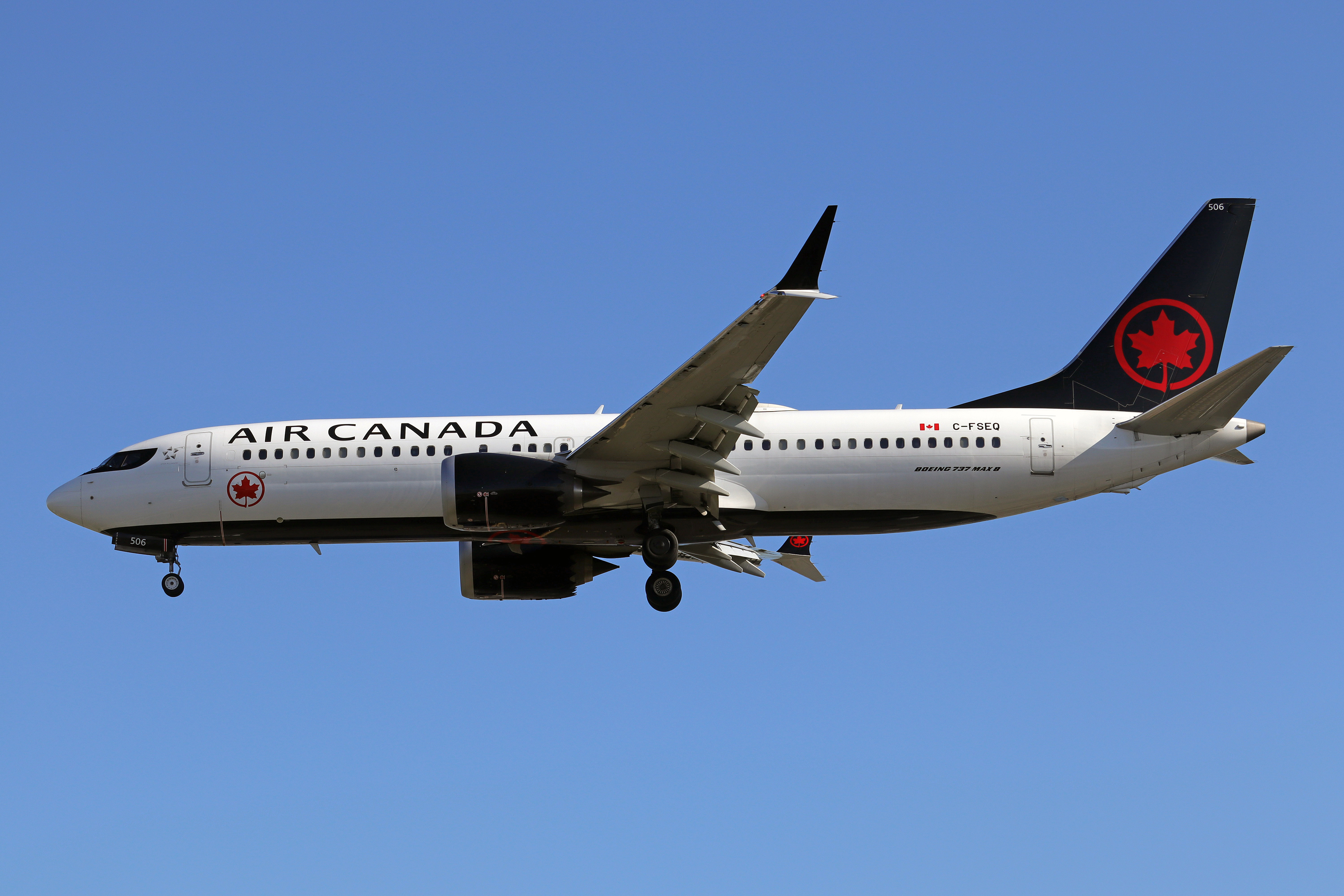
Boeing 737 MAX 8

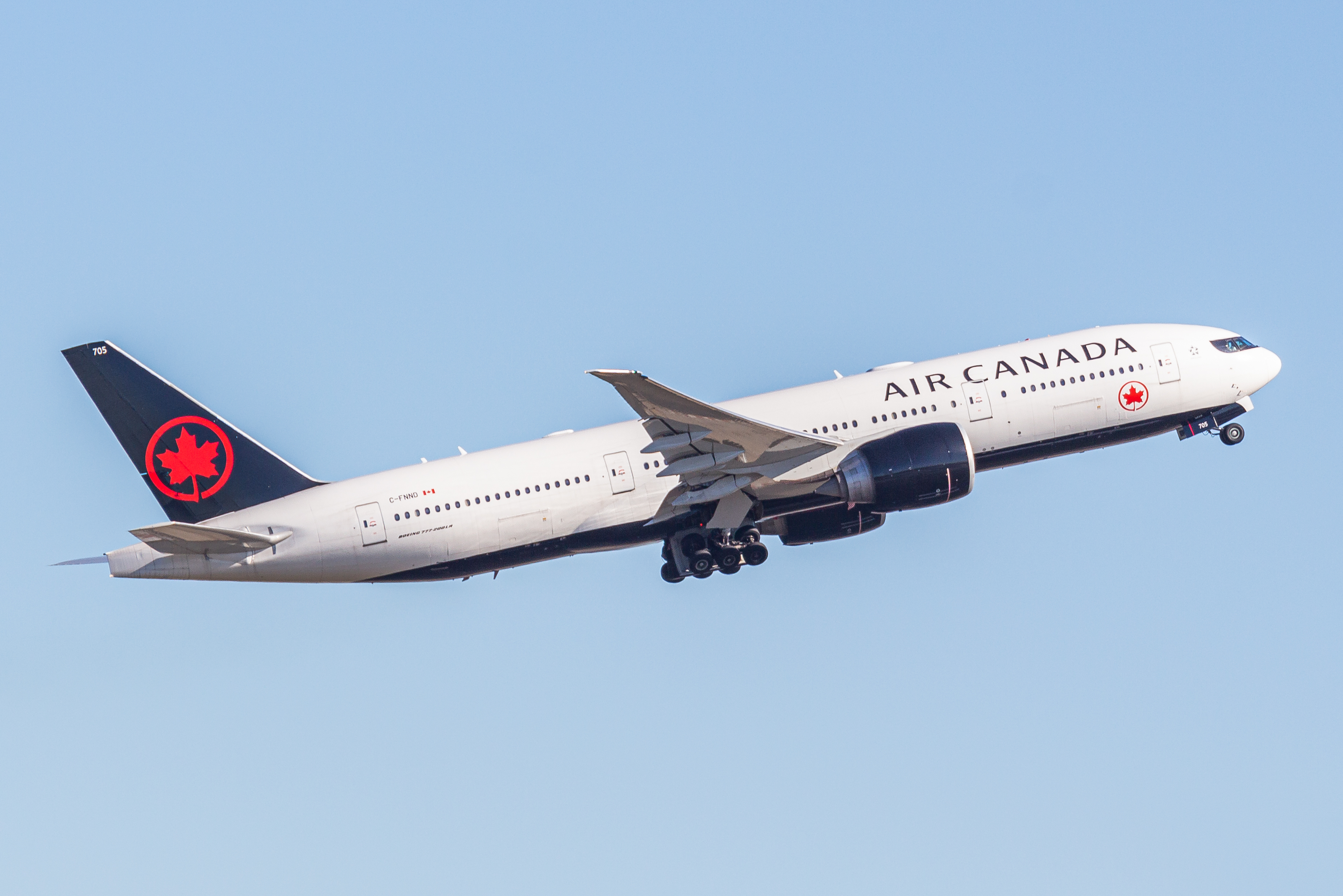
Boeing 777-200LR

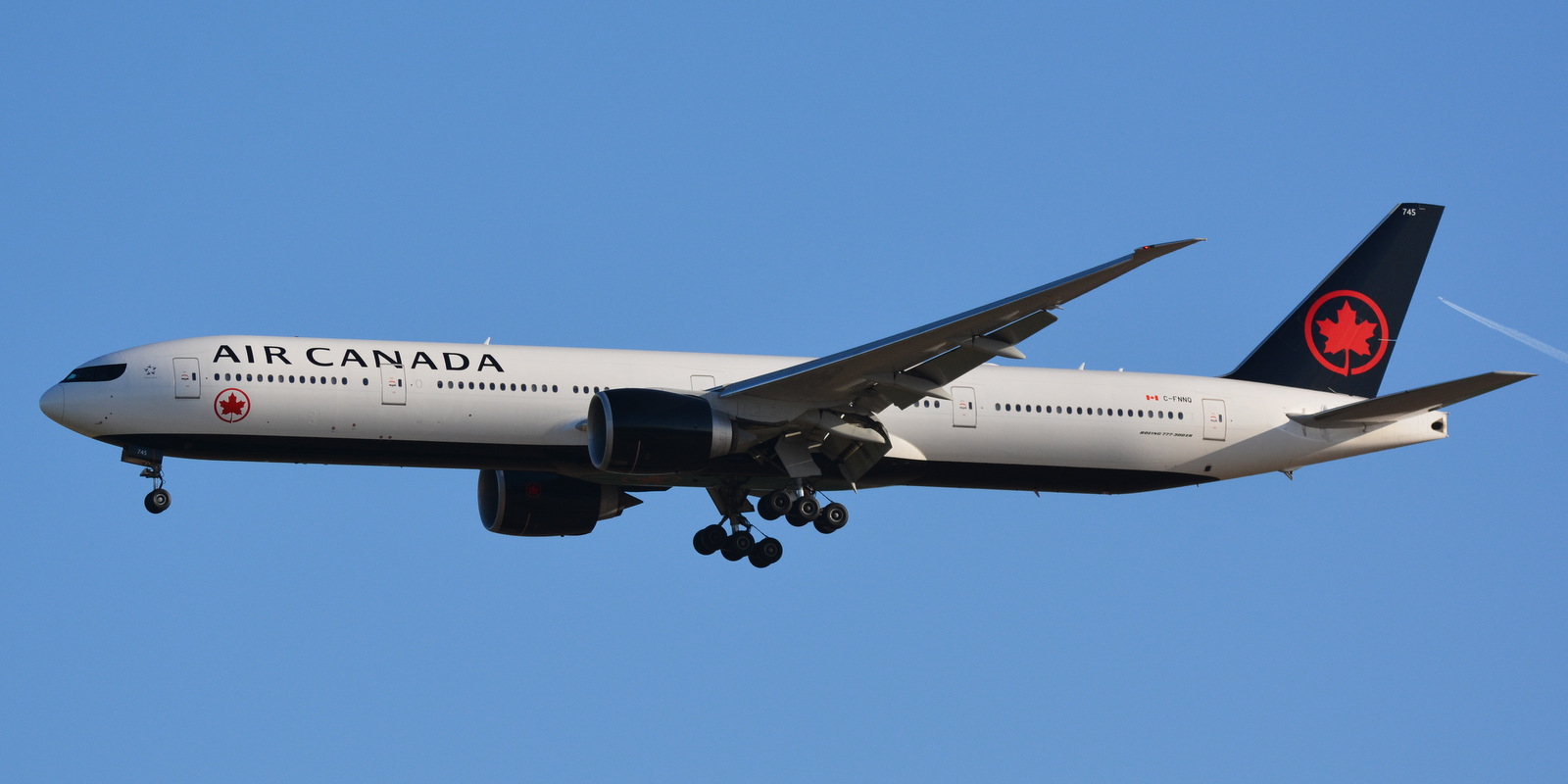
Boeing 777-300ER

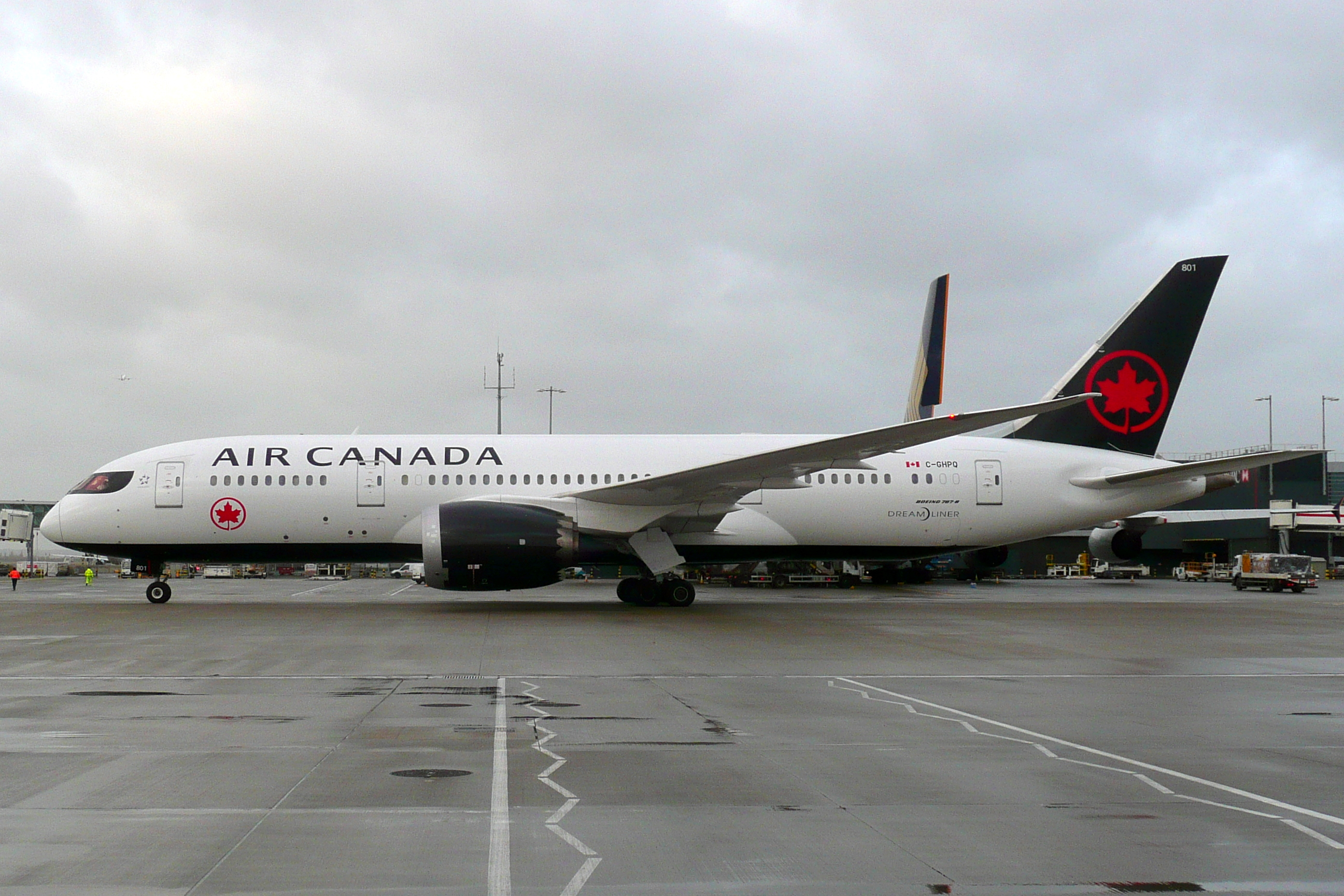
Boeing 787-8

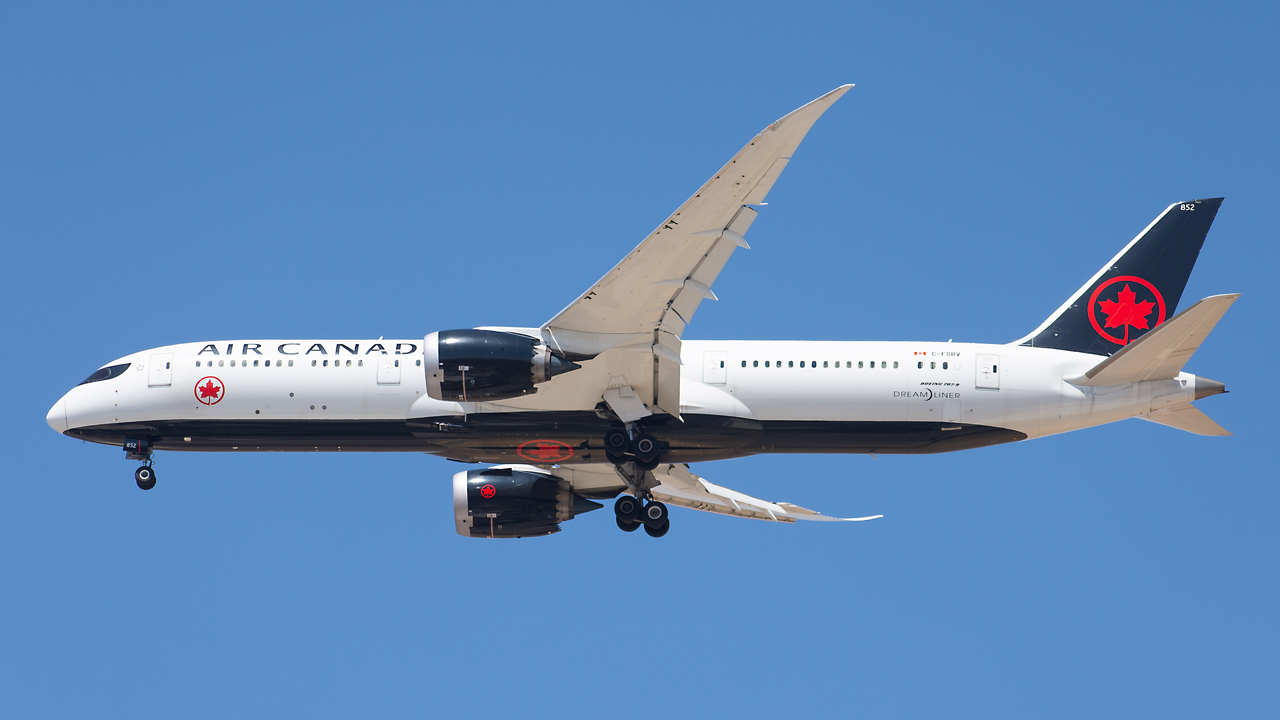
Boeing 787-9

== Historical fleet ==
- Air Canada's Douglas DC-8-63 fleet was withdrawn from passenger service in 1983. Six of these were converted to DC-8-73 with new CFM engines, converted to freighters (DC-8-73F) in 1984, and retained for use by Air Canada Cargo, eventually being sold off to DHL between 1990 and 1994.
- Air Canada's Douglas DC-9-15s were used up to 1968. One DC-9-32CF was used for cargo flights until 1977. The McDonnell Douglas DC-9-32s were used from 1967 to 2002.
- Air Canada's Canadair CRJ-100 aircraft were used from the mid-1990s until the early 2000s when they were transferred to regional affiliate Jazz Air LP operating as Air Canada Jazz.
- Air Canada's Airbus A340-500s were retired in November 2007 and replaced by Boeing 777-200LRs.
- Air Canada's Airbus A340-300s were retired in November 2008 and replaced by Boeing 777-300ERs.
- Air Canada's Boeing 767-200ERs were retired at the end of 2008 and replaced by Airbus A330-300s.
- The McDonnell Douglas DC-10-30 aircraft were operated from 1979 to 2000 by Canadian Pacific Air Lines and its successors Canadian Airlines International.
- The Boeing 737-200 aircraft were operated from 1968 to 2000 by Canadian Pacific Air Lines and its successors Canadian Airlines International. After the merger with Canadian Airlines International, Air Canada operated these aircraft in a mainline two-class configuration, as well as in an all-economy class configuration with the Air Canada Tango and the Zip low-cost carrier brands.
- In 2020, Air Canada retired their entire Boeing 767-300ER and Embraer E190 fleets. The Embraer E190 was replaced by the Airbus A220-300, while the Boeing 767-300ER was replaced by Boeing 787. As of December 2021, certain previously retired Boeing 767-300ER (legacy passenger variant) aircraft are being converted and reintroduced into the fleet as Boeing 767-300ER/BDSF cargo aircraft.
- Air Canada additionally planned to completely retire its Airbus A319 fleet in May 2020, replacing them with further Airbus A220-300s. The mainline A319s were tentatively retired later than previously planned on February 7, 2021, with the final mainline A319 operating a flight from Calgary to Phoenix; however, Air Canada continued to operate A319s as part of its charter fleet under Air Canada Jetz. Subsequently, the mainline A319 service resumed in March 2022 until its retirement on September 7, 2025.

Aircraft that Air Canada has operated since 1937, but are no longer in the fleet:

Previously operated fleet
Aircraft	Total	Introduced	Retired	Notes	Refs
Airbus A319-100	48	1997	2025	12 aircraft remain in service with Air Canada Rouge.	
Airbus A340-300	13	1995	2008	Replaced by Boeing 777-300ER.	
Airbus A340-500	2	2004	2007	Disposed to TAM Airlines. Replaced by Boeing 777-200LR.	
Avro Lancastrian	Unknown	1943	1947		
BAe 146-200	5	1990	2005	Operated by Air BC.	
BAe 146-200	5	1990	2005	Operated by Air Nova.	
Boeing 727-200	30	1974	1992		
Boeing 737-200	44	1976	2004	Former Canadian Airlines International fleet.	
Boeing 747-100	5	1971	1998		
Boeing 747-200M	3	1975	1999		
Boeing 747-400	4	1990	2004	Former Canadian Airlines International fleet.	
Boeing 747-400M	3	1990	2004		
Boeing 767-200	23	1983	2008	Replaced by Airbus A330-300. C-GAUN, nicknamed Gimli Glider made an emergency landing at Gimli Industrial Park Airport on July 23, 1983 after running out of fuel at 41,000 ft.	
Boeing 767-300ER	44	1988	2020	Replaced by Boeing 787-9 and Boeing 777-300ER. Six aircraft are reintroduced into the fleet as Boeing 767-300ER/BDSF cargo aircraft.	
Bombardier CRJ100	26	1994	2002	Transferred to Jazz Aviation.	
Bristol Freighter	Unknown	1953	1955		
Canadair North Star	Unknown	1946	1961		
Douglas DC-3	27	1945	1963		
Douglas DC-8-40	11	1974	1979		
Douglas DC-8-50	3	1968	1980		
Douglas DC-8-50CF	7	1964	1985		
Douglas DC-8-60	14	1970	1986	CF-TIW, operating as Air Canada Flight 621, crashed while attempting a second landing at Toronto. Premature deployment of the spoilers on the first attempt resulted in a hard landing and structural damage.	
Douglas DC-8-70F	8	1974	1994		
Embraer E175	15	2005	2013	Launch customer. Transferred to Sky Regional Airlines.	
Embraer E190	45	2005	2020	20 aircraft were bought by Boeing Capital as part of a deal with Boeing, the rest were later taken up by Beautech Power System and Nordic Aviation Capital. Replaced by Airbus A220-300.	
Fokker F28 Fellowship	30	1986	2004	Operated by Canadian Regional Airlines.	
Lockheed L-1011 TriStar	12	1973	1996	Replaced by Boeing 767-300ER.	
Lockheed L-1011-500 Tristar	6	1981	1992	Sold to Delta Air Lines and replaced by Boeing 767-300ER.	
Lockheed L-1049 Super Constellation	Unknown	1953	1963		
Lockheed Model 10 Electra	Unknown	1937	1941		
Lockheed Model 14 Super Electra	Unknown	1941	1949		
Lockheed Model 18 Lodestar	Unknown	1941	1949		
McDonnell Douglas DC-9-10	14	1966	1981		
McDonnell Douglas DC-9-30	50	1967	2002	CF-TLU caught fire as Flight 797 in 1983 at Cincinnati/Northern Kentucky International Airport. CF-TLV crashed as Air Canada Flight 189 in 1978 at Toronto Pearson International Airport after a high speed rejected takeoff due to landing gear issues.	
McDonnell Douglas MD-11F	3	2005	2008	Leased from World Airways.	
Stearman 4-EM Senior Speedmail	Unknown	1937	1939		
Vickers Viscount	51	1955	1974	15 – model V.724, 36 – model V.757	
Vickers Vanguard	23	1961	1972	23 – Type 952	

British Aerospace 146-200 and Fokker F28 jet aircraft were operated by regional airline affiliates of Air Canada via code sharing agreements.
