= Comox =

Comox refers to these Canadian things:

== Places ==
- Comox, British Columbia, a town (and peninsula) on Vancouver Island
- CFB Comox, a nearby military base
- Comox Lake, a nearby body of water
- Comox (electoral district), a provincial electoral district, 1871–1986

== Other uses ==
- Comox people (or Kʼómoks), an indigenous group in British Columbia
  - Comox language, their Coast Salish language
  - K'ómoks First Nation (or the Comox Indian Band), the government of the insular Comox
  - the mainland Comox:
    - Sliammon
    - Klahoose
    - Homalco
- Comox (steamboat), 1891–1920
- HMCS Comox, several naval vessels

== See also ==
- Comox Land District, one of the 59 cadastral subdivisions of British Columbia
- Comox Valley, a region of British Columbia
- Comox Valley Regional District, a regional district of British Columbia
- Comox Valley (provincial electoral district), a provincial electoral district since 1991
- Comox—Atlin, a federal electoral district 1903–1914
- Comox–Alberni, a federal electoral district 1914–1976, 1987–1996
- Comox—Powell River, a federal electoral district 1976–1987
- Comox Glacier
