= 2020 Kamloops Snowbirds crash =

Canadian Air Force accident

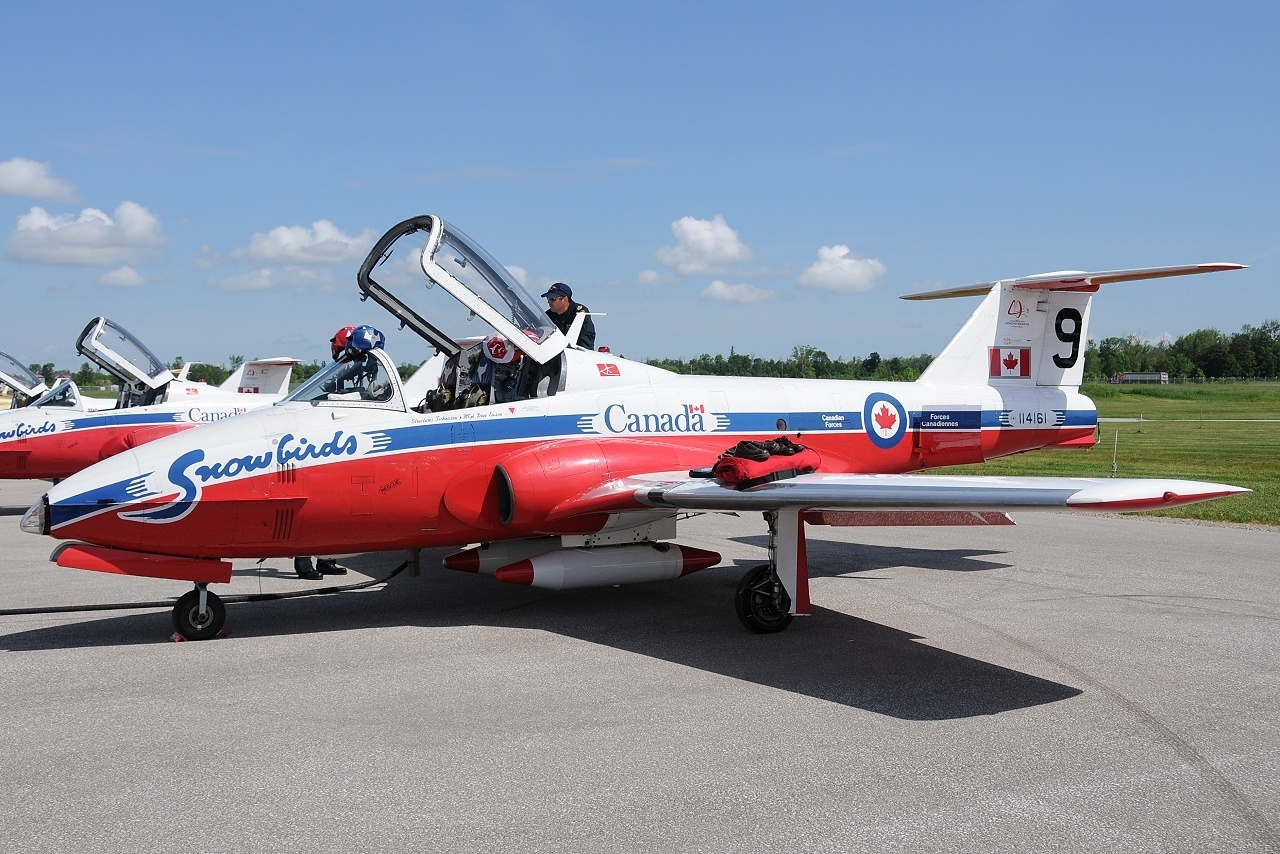
- 114161, the aircraft involved in the accident, seen in 2010

Accident
- Date: 17 May 2020
- Summary: Bird strike
- Site: Kamloops, British Columbia, Canada
- Total fatalities: 1
- Total injuries: 1
- Total survivors: 1

Aircraft
- Aircraft type: Canadair CT-114 Tutor
- Operator: Snowbirds
- Registration: 114161
- Flight origin: Kamloops Airport, Kamloops, British Columbia, Canada
- Destination: CFB Comox, Comox, British Columbia, Canada
- Occupants: 2
- Crew: 2
- Fatalities: 1
- Injuries: 1
- Survivors: 1

On May 17, 2020, a Royal Canadian Air Force Snowbirds plane crashed in Kamloops, British Columbia. One person, Captain Jennifer Casey, was killed, and the pilot was seriously injured after ejecting.

== Background ==
The Snowbirds had been flying over many Canadian cities as part of "Operation Inspiration", a plan to raise the country's morale due to the COVID-19 pandemic.

The Canadair CT-114 Tutor jets used by the Snowbirds were built from 1964 to 1967 and have been in service since. The aircraft that crashed was 57 years old.

== Cause ==
After a nearly year-long investigation, it was concluded that an engine stall, caused by a bird strike was responsible for the crash. Both of the occupants attempted to eject, but the report showed that Capt. Casey's ejection seat did not function properly. Since the crash happened shortly after takeoff, the plane was still at a low altitude and the pilot did not have time to regain control.

The report gave several recommendations, including more extensive training for pilots when flying near residential areas, installing flight recorders that can survive a crash, and making the ejection system more stable.

== Reactions ==
Prime Minister Justin Trudeau said that he is "deeply saddened" by the event and Governor General Julie Payette stated that she was "devastated". On May 18, 2020, dozens of pilots performed a memorial flyover of the location where the plane crashed. To mark the one-year anniversary of the accident, the City of Kamloops created a series of memorials.
