= Abbotsford International Airshow =

Canadian airshow

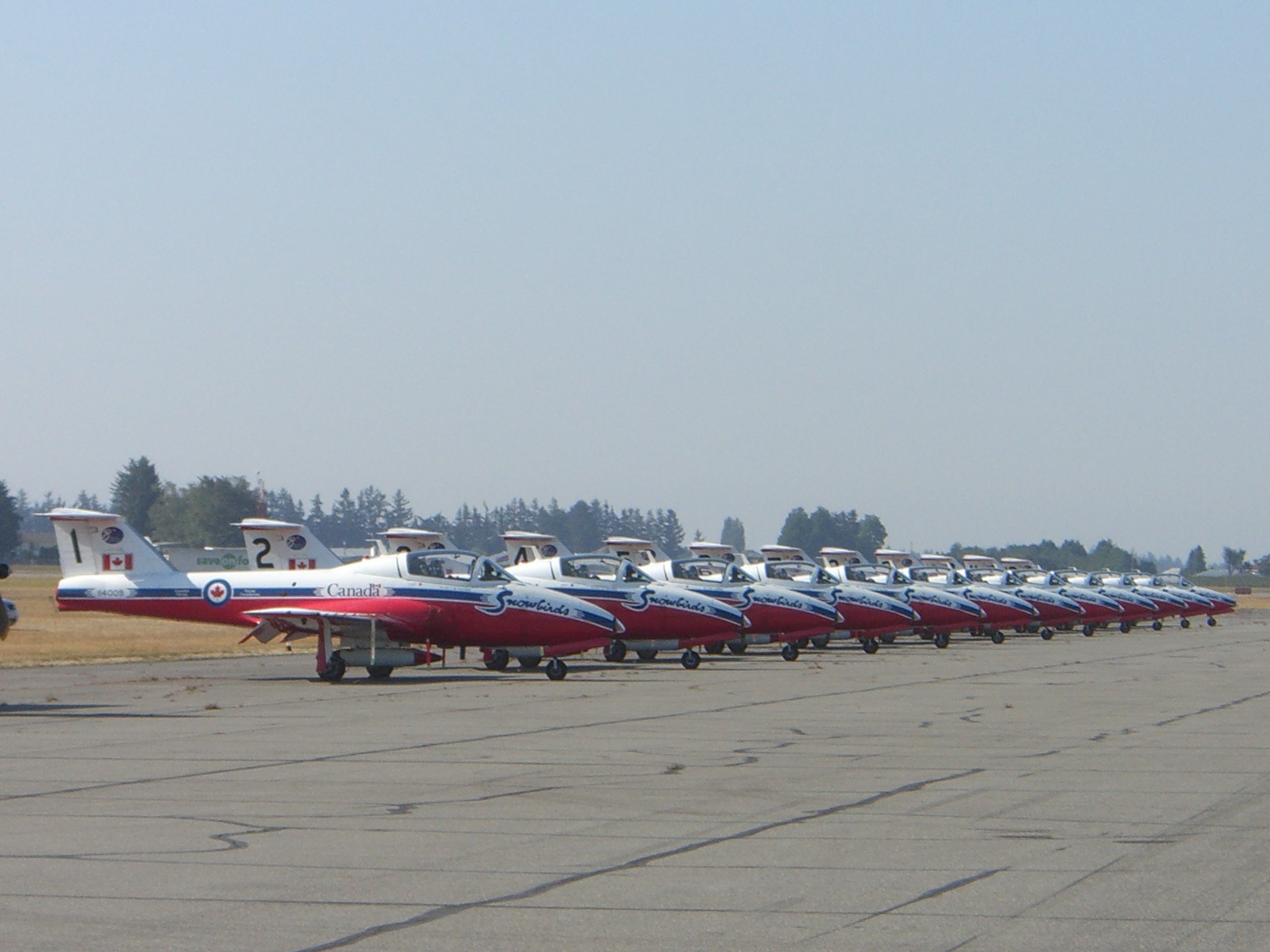
- The Canadian Snowbirds on the "Hotline" at the Abbotsford Airshow 2000
- Genre: Air show
- Dates: August
- Venue: Abbotsford International Airport
- Location: Abbotsford, British Columbia
- Country: Canada
- Established: 1962
- Attendance: ~25,000 each day
- Organizer: Abbotsford International Airshow Society
- Website: abbotsfordairshow.com

The Abbotsford International Airshow is held annually on the second Friday, Saturday and Sunday in August at Abbotsford International Airport in Abbotsford, British Columbia, Canada.

It is Canada's largest airshow. In the mid-1970s, Abbotsford was designated as Canada's National Airshow by Prime Minister Pierre E. Trudeau. It features both military and civilian aircraft from Canada and the United States, and on occasion has had military aircraft from other countries. These include Britain, France, Italy, Germany, Russia, The Netherlands, Brazil, Chile and Ukraine.

== History ==
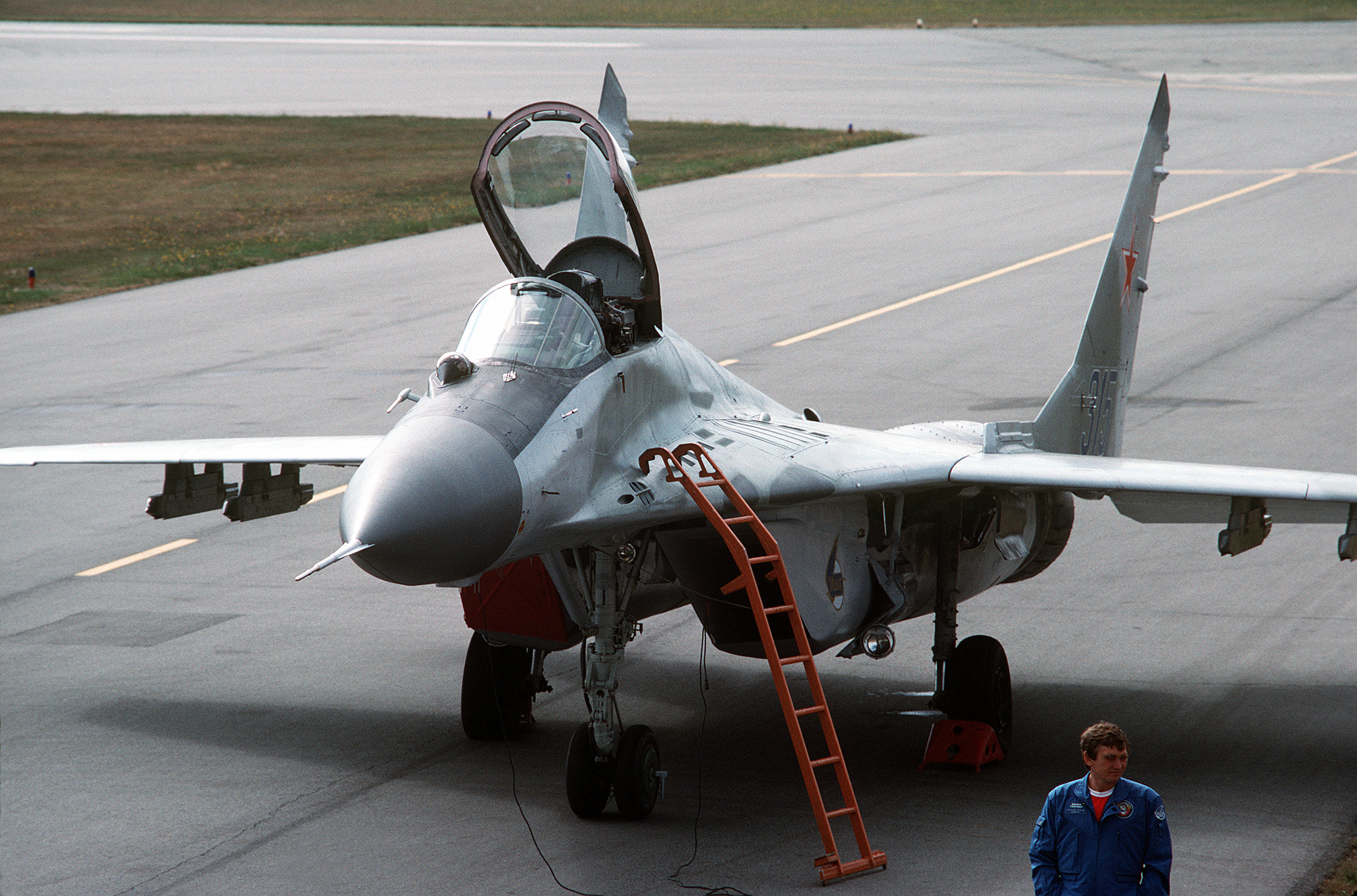
MiG-29 fighter parked on the ramp after a demonstration flight at the Abbotsford Air Show, 1989.

The airshow was started in 1962 by the Abbotsford Flying Club.

The show experienced continuous growth through the 1960s and 1970s.

The 1986 show was conducted in conjunction with Expo 86, the Vancouver world's fair. This saw the inclusion of several European teams like the Patrouille de France and the Frecce Tricolori to the traditional participants ... as well as the Soviet-Ukrainian Antonov AN-124.

In 1989, the show set a three-day attendance record of 321,000 people. The USSR was represented by a large number of aircraft at Abbotsford. Making their North American debuts were two MiG-29 Fulcrums (a single and two-seater), an Su-26M aerobatic plane, a Ka-32 helicopter and the An-225 Mriya, the world's largest aircraft. The MiG-29 demonstration pilot was Anatoly Kvochur, who had ejected out of a Mig-29 at Le Bourget, France, just months earlier. History was made at Abbotsford on the last day of the show when Major Bob Wade, Canadian Armed Forces CF-18 Hornet pilot, became the first Western pilot to fly a modern fighter jet from the USSR. Wade took the controls of the Mig-29UB two-seat aircraft with Soviet test pilot Valery Menitsky. Other highlights at the show included the first appearance at Abbotsford for the only airworthy Lancaster bomber in North America and the return of the USAF Thunderbirds for the first time since 1981.

Post Cold War defence cuts affected the attendance of military teams and aircraft throughout the 1990s. Poor financial management resulted in the annual show being canceled in 1998 and returning in 1999.

In 1994 Dan and Loretta Newall got married before the start of the show, the first wedding in the 33-year history of the show. The vows were almost inaudible due to the Harriers taking off six minutes ahead of schedule. The wedding cake was shared with people around the wedding site. CTV gave them five minutes of air time on the news.

In 1995, while the Abbotsford Airshow included an arms trade aspect, Project Censored Canada rated it as the eighth most censored news story of the year. The trade expo saw delegates visit from countries such as the United States and Saudi Arabia to inspect and purchase weaponry.

Celebrating its fortieth anniversary in 2002 was a significant accomplishment; it was a milestone year while airshows across North America were threatened with cancellation due to high insurance costs after 9/11.

In 2014 it was named one of the ten best airshows in the world, and also held a twilight show for the first time. In December 2014 the airshow won a prestigious Silver Pinnacle award from the International Council of Airshows.

In 2015 the airshow continued its successful twilight show and had the Breitling jet team from France perform its first Canadian show. In addition, the airshow hosted the USAF F-22 Raptor for the first time.

In 2016 two 5th generation USAF F-35A Lightning II fighter jets made history as this marked the first appearance of an F-35 in Canada. Although two aircraft were at the airshow only one was put on static display.

== Present ==
The show is now operated by the Abbotsford International Airshow Society. It occurs annually in the Summer, and typically in Mid-August due to optimal weather conditions.

== Performers ==
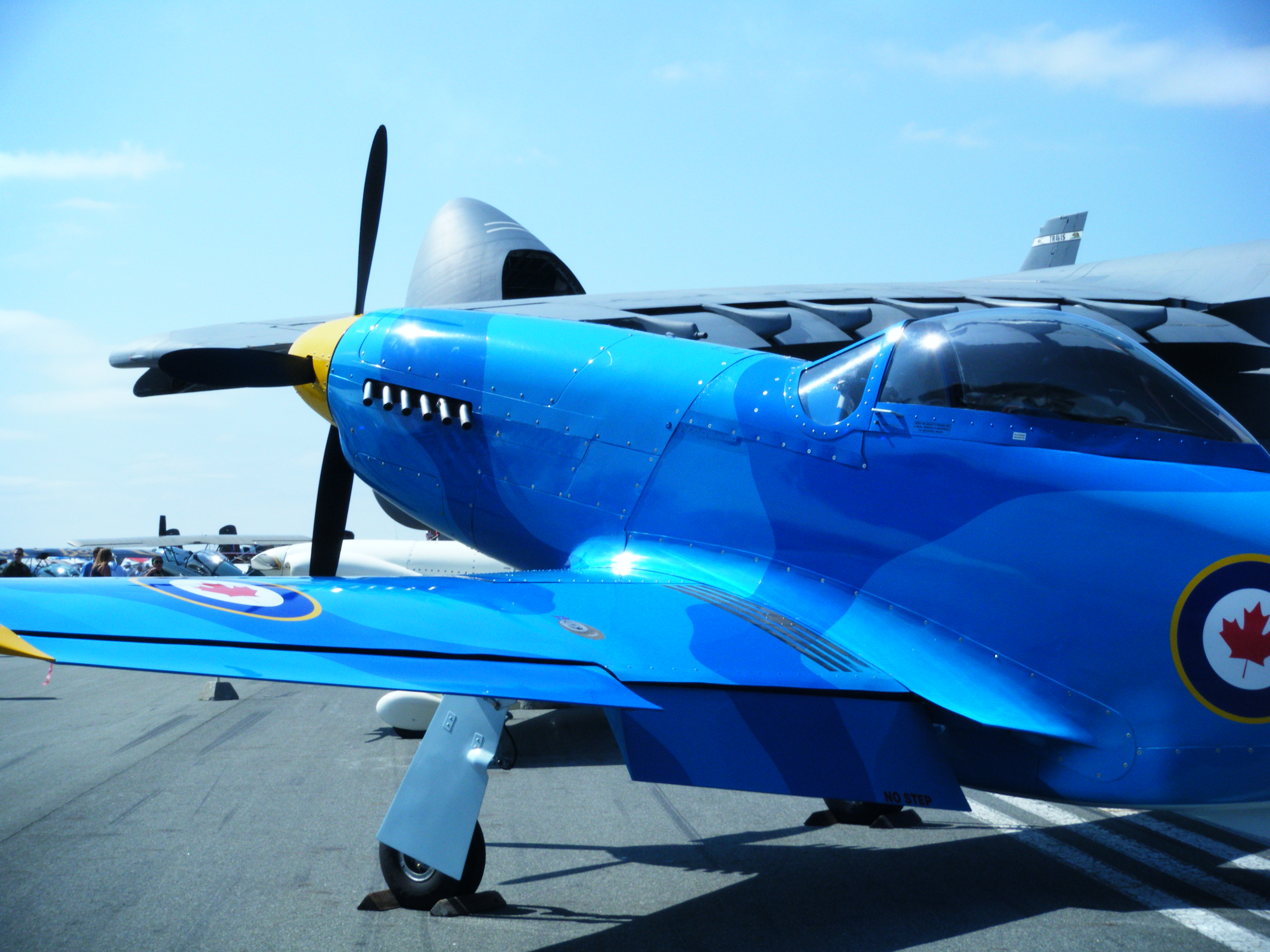
P-51 Mustang at the Abbotsford air show.

Currently the duo consisting of Roy Hafeli & Ken Hildebrandt, more commonly known as H2A2 or Hafeli and Hildebrandt Airshow Announcers provide the Airshow announcing every year.

Roy Hafeli began announcing at Abbotsford in 1999, and is a recipient of the North West Council of Air Shows 2005 Showmanship award and the 2006 Eric Beard Memorial Spirit of Flight award. Roy also announces at many other airshows throughout Canada and the USA as well as at other special events.

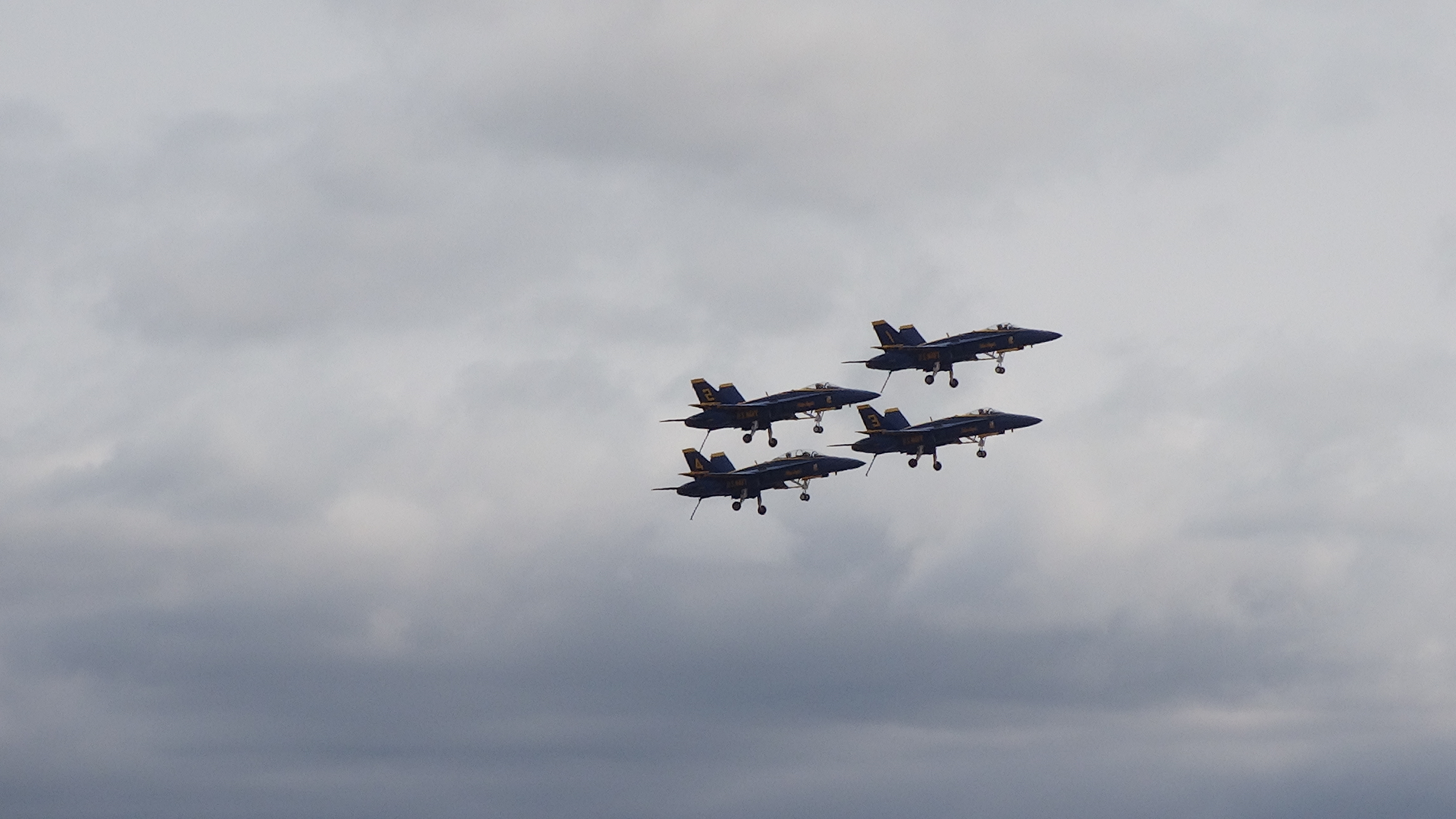
Blue Angels F-18 fighters during demonstration flight at the Abbotsford Air Show, 2018.

Ken Hildebrandt is the newest voice at Abbotsford. He began announcing in 2007. Having attended every Abbotsford show since 1979, he noticed that while he was interested by the flying machines that flew over his head each summer, he became interested in the people who announced the action over the loud speakers. Thus began a thirty-year interest in airshow announcing.

Demonstration teams

- Snowbirds, Canada, 1971-2021, scheduled for 2023 (CT-114 Tutor)
- SkyHawks, Canada (parachute team)
- Thunderbirds, USAF, 1969 (F-4 Phantom), 1977, 1979, 1981 (T-38 Talon) 1989, 1991, 1993, 2002, 2005, 2008, 2012, 2019, 2022 (F-16 Falcon)
- Blue Angels, US Navy, 1967 (F11A Tiger) 1970 and 1972 (F-4 Phantom) 1976, 1978, 1980, 1986 (A-4 Skyhawk) 1988, 1990, 1992, 1994, 2003, 2018 (F/A-18 Hornet)
- Smoke Squadron (Esquadrilha da Fumaca), Brazil 1985, 1986, 1987, 1995
- Patrouille de France, France, 1986
- Frecce Tricolori, Italy 1986
- Escuadrilla de Alta Acrobacia Halcones, Chile 1995
- The Russian Knights, Russia, 1993
- Golden Centennaires, Canada, 1967
- Breitling Jet Team, 2015, 2016

== Accidents and incidents during aerial display ==
- August 8, 1969 At noon a Boeing 747 airliner flew the 75 miles from Paine Field in Everett, Washington to make its first public airshow appearance completing three left to right flybys including a final low level slow pass to open the first day of the three day airshow. Immediately after a Mini Mustang entered the flight line from the left for a low inverted pass. Near midfield the Mini Mustang gyrated violently and dove into the ground killing the pilot, 20-year-old flight instructor Scott Nelskog from Washington State. The determination was that the residual wake vortex from the 747 pass rolled the Mini Mustang resulting in the fatal crash.
- August 12, 1973: During a four plane formation display a Canadian Forces CF-101 Voodoo entered 'inertial roll coupling' which overstressed the aircraft leading to a mid-air disintegration into several balls of flames. Both crew members ejected safely through the fireball. No injuries occurred as debris landed in Washington State south of the Abbotsford Airport.
- August 11, 2018: At approximately 5:30 pm, after the show had finished for the day, a recently restored 1930s era De Havilland Dragon Rapide crashed while taking off. The Dragon Rapide was offering rides in the historic aircraft to those who had purchased tickets. It was carrying 4 passengers and a pilot at the time of the incident. The pilot, John Sessions, was seriously injured and required a foot amputation after being airlifted to Royal Columbian Hospital. The other passengers made it out with various injuries that ranged from mild to serious.

== Criticisms ==
The Abbotsford Airshow has been the subject of criticism throughout its history, partially due to the glorification of war as seen through some of the stunts performed and weapons displayed, and partially due to its associated defense trades expo. In 1995, Project Censored listed the Abbotsford Airshow as the 8th most censored news story of the year, largely due to the related arms trading expo. The airshow itself was also often a venue at which international dignitaries could view some of the defense technologies available. The expo component of the airshow ended for several years shortly after, but has continued again as the Aerospace, Defense and Security Expo (ADSE).
