= Abbotsford International Airport =

Airport in Abbotsford, British Columbia, Canada

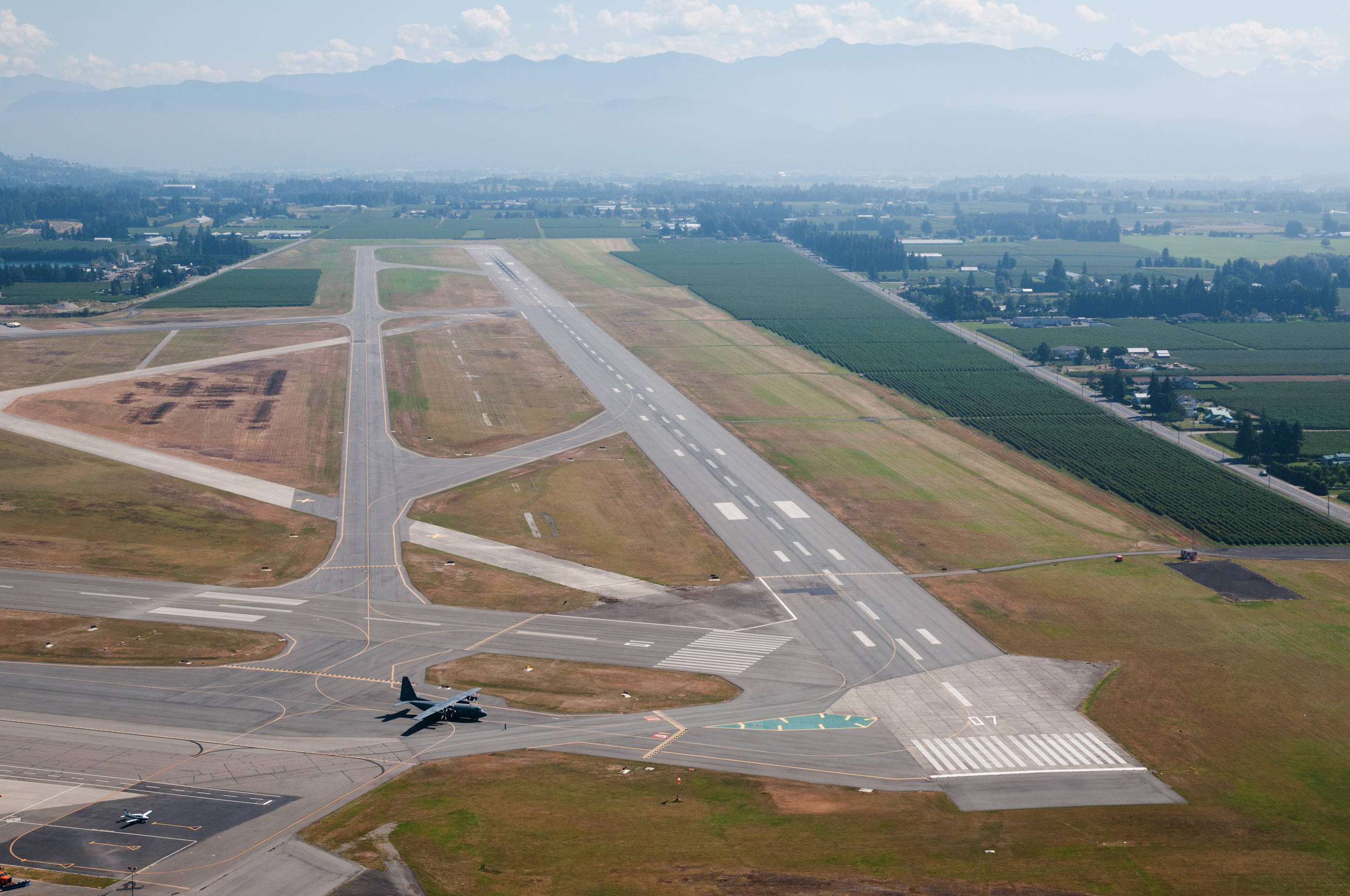
- IATA: YXX; ICAO: CYXX; WMO: 71108

Summary
- Airport type: Public
- Owner/Operator: City of Abbotsford
- Location: Abbotsford, British Columbia, Canada
- Time zone: PST (UTC−08:00)
  - Summer (DST): PDT (UTC−07:00)
- Elevation AMSL: 194 ft (59 m)
- Coordinates: 49°01′31″N 122°21′36″W
- Website: www.abbotsfordairport.ca

Map
- Location in British Columbia CYXX (Canada)

Runways
Direction	Length		Surface
Direction	ft	m	Surface
07/25	9,597	2,925	Asphalt
01/19	5,328	1,624	Asphalt

Statistics (2025)
- Aircraft movements: 324,103
- Passengers: 1,025,655
- Sources: Canada Flight Supplement and Transport Canada; Environment Canada; Movements from Statistics Canada; Passengers from Abbotsford Airport

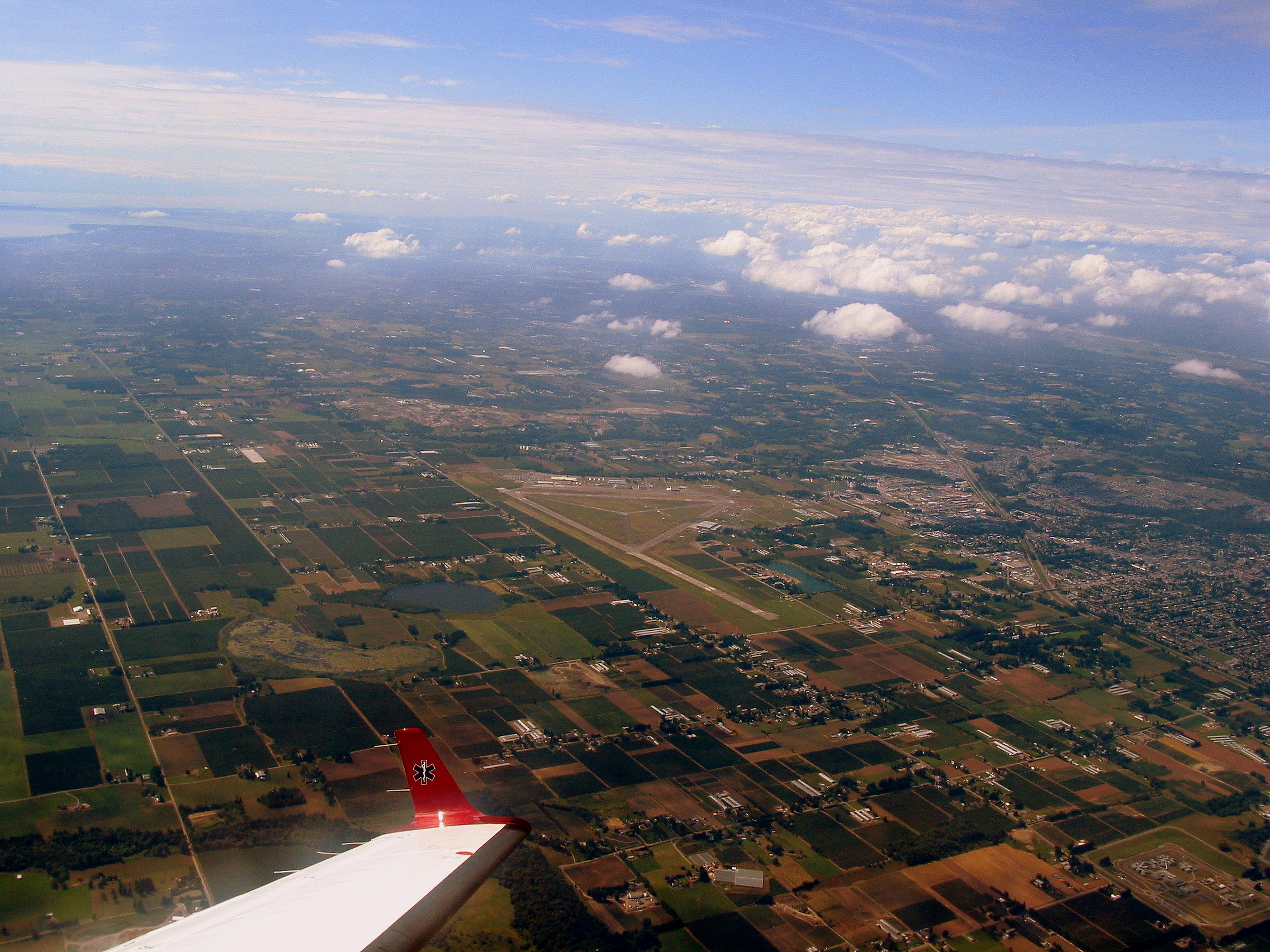
Aerial view of YXX

Abbotsford International Airport (IATA: YXX, ICAO: CYXX) is located in Abbotsford, British Columbia, Canada, 2.2 nautical miles (4.1 km; 2.5 mi) southwest of the city centre. It is the second largest airport in the Lower Mainland region of British Columbia, after Vancouver International Airport (YVR), and is in close proximity to British Columbia Highway 1, and the US-Canada border. It is located about 65 kilometres (40 mi) from downtown Vancouver.

YXX offers daily domestic scheduled services and seasonal international scheduled services. The airport is equipped with an instrument landing system, on-site aircraft rescue and firefighting, and a terminal with customs and passenger screening. It is classified as an airport of entry by Nav Canada and is staffed by the Canada Border Services Agency (CBSA) for all scheduled international arrivals. CBSA also provides clearance services to all general aviation aircraft with no more than 15 passengers.

Abbotsford Airport is used by multiple companies, including Cascade Aerospace, the Conair Group, and the University of the Fraser Valley Aerospace Centre.

Abbotsford Airport is also home to the Abbotsford Shell Aerocentre FBO and flying schools, such as Coastal Pacific Aviation, Principal Air and Chinook Helicopters. In addition, it is also used in the Abbotsford International Airshow, Defense & Security Expo, and Tradex events centre.

The facility covers 519 hectares (1,282 acres, 2.0 square miles) of airport property.

There are approximately 87 hectares (215 acres) of land immediately available for airside and landside development. In 2023, 1,275,484 passengers passed through Abbotsford International Airport.

In 2018, the airport announced it will undergo a $5 million, 14,000-square-foot expansion to add new gates and additional passenger seating capacity.

== History ==
=== World War II (1940–1945) ===
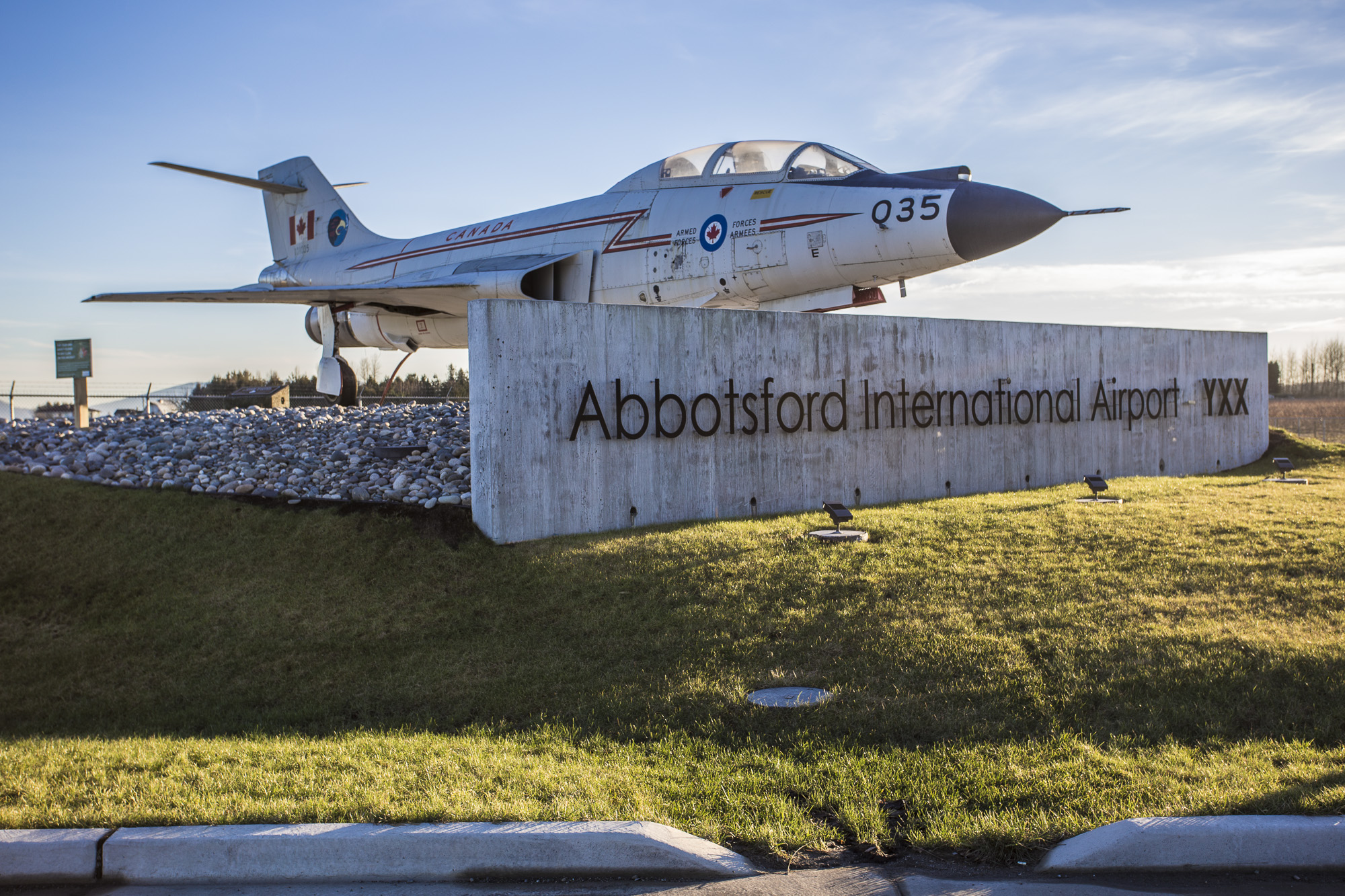
McDonnell CF-101 Voodoo at Abbotsford Airport entrance

The Royal Canadian Air Force purchased the land to build Abbotsford Airport in 1940. In 1943 the construction of the three 1,555 m × 60 m (5,100 ft × 200 ft) runways based on a triangular layout was complete. The same year, under the British Commonwealth Air Training Plan, the No. 24 Elementary Flying Training School started operations from this location until 1944. The No 5 Operational Conversion Unit was split between Abbotsford and Boundary Bay Airport.

==== Aerodrome information ====
In approximately 1942, the aerodrome was listed at 49°01′N 122°22′W with a Var. 23.5 degrees E and no listed elevation. The aerodrome was listed as "Under construction - Serviceable" and had three runways as follows:

Runway name	Length	Width	Surface
12/30	5,000 feet (1,524 m)	200 feet (61 m)	Hard surfaced
8/26	5,000 feet (1,524 m)	200 feet (61 m)	Hard surfaced
18/36	5,000 feet (1,524 m)	200 feet (61 m)	Hard surfaced

=== Post war (1945–1997) ===
Following World War II, the airport was largely used for general aviation and as a secondary field to Vancouver International Airport. Prior to the use of instrument landing systems, fog could make Vancouver Airport unusable and flights had to land at Abbotsford. If a big earthquake floods or otherwise damages low-lying Vancouver Airport on Sea Island in Richmond, then as many flights as possible will likely be looking to land at Abbotsford Airport.

The airport became the home to Skyways Air Services and Conair Aviation in the 1960s. Abbotsford is still the primary base for Conair's fleet of water bombers.

In September 1984, Pope John Paul II held an open-air mass for over 200,000 people at the airport.

=== Current (1997–present) ===
On January 1, 1997, the ownership of the Abbotsford Airport was transferred from the Department of Transport to the City of Abbotsford for a sum of $10. In June of that year, Abbotsford became a jet passenger airport in with the start of scheduled service to Alberta by WestJet. Prior, Airspeed Aviation had been the exclusive operator offering regional service to Victoria, B.C. since 1986. Canada 3000 was the first airline to offer transcontinental service from Abbotsford to Toronto in June 2000. Abbotsford's first international charter flight was to Puerto Vallarta, Mexico, in December 2003 by tour operator Transat Holidays.

Since 2000, many airlines and tour operators have come and gone from Abbotsford, including Air Canada, Air Canada Tango, Air Canada Jazz, Air North, Canada 3000, Central Mountain Air, Helijet, Jetsgo, Signature Vacations, Zoom Airlines, Harmony Airways, Peace Air and ZIP Air.

In 2010, a new parallel taxiway was added alongside runway 07/25, and the main airport apron was extended. An aircraft run-up bay that can accommodate up to three medium weight category aircraft at the same time was added near the Cascade Aerospace hangar.

From 2017, Abbotsford International Airport began to see a resurgence in air passenger numbers, with the introduction of service to Edmonton and Calgary with WestJet. In 2018, Flair Airlines introduced additional flights to Edmonton, and new flights to Winnipeg and Hamilton. Swoop, WestJet's ULCC subsidiary, began similar operations, with flights to Edmonton, Winnipeg, Hamilton, London (ON), Las Vegas, and seasonal flights to Mazatlán and Puerto Vallarta. Air Canada Rouge used to offer seasonal service to Toronto between June and October since 2015. This service was initially suspended in 2019 due to the Boeing 737 MAX groundings and once again in 2020 due to the COVID-19 pandemic. It has never returned since.

== Airshow ==
Since 1962, the airport has hosted the annual Abbotsford International Airshow usually held the second weekend in August. Designated as Canada's national airshow in the mid 1970s by Prime Minister Pierre Trudeau, it is Canada's largest airshow as well as one of North America's largest airshows. It has been listed as one of the ten best airshows in the world. it draws airplane enthusiasts from all over Western Canada and the Northwestern United States. The static displays allow people to get up close to many of the exhibits while numerous performances decorate the skies above. The International Council of Airshows awarded a Silver Pinnacle Award to the airshow in 2014.

== Airlines and destinations ==
=== Passenger ===
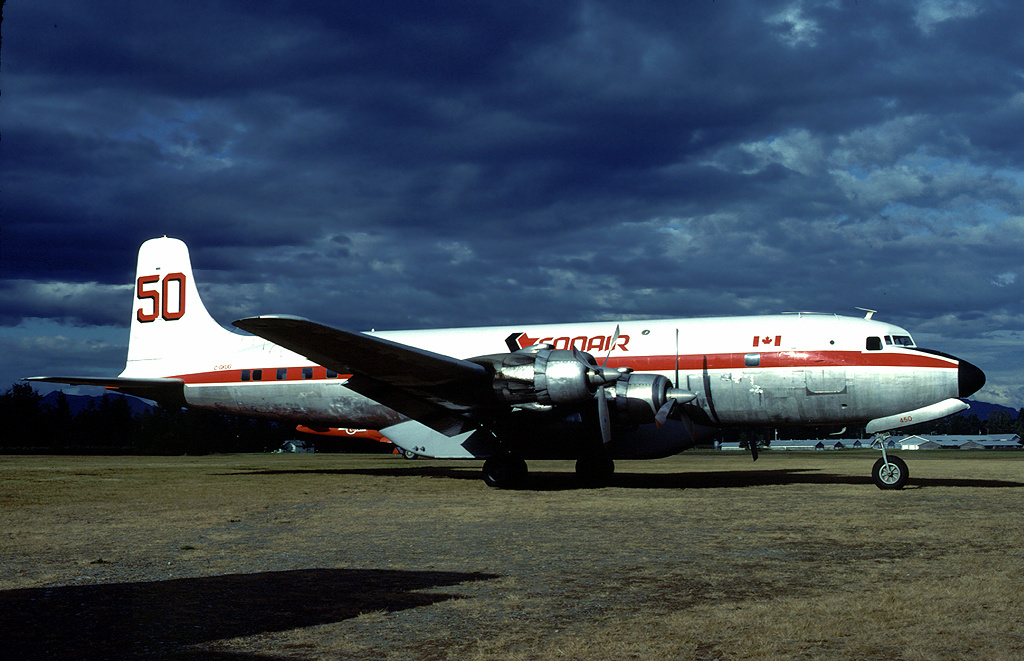
A Douglas DC-6 of Conair in 1983

Airlines	Destinations
Flair Airlines	Calgary, Edmonton, Toronto–Pearson
WestJet	Calgary; Seasonal: Puerto Vallarta

=== Cargo ===
Airlines	Destinations
SkyLink Express	Vancouver
UPS Airlines	Vancouver

== Statistics ==
=== Annual traffic ===
Annual passenger traffic
Year	Passengers	% change
2010	463,763	Steady
2011	475,223	▲2.5%
2012	490,636	▲3.2%
2013	478,341	▼ -2.5%
2014	477,087	▼ -0.3%
2015	487,833	▲2.3%
2016	530,643	▲8.8%
2017	677,653	▲27.7%
2018	842,212	▲24.3%
2019	1,008,116	▲19.7%
2020	315,578	▼ -68.7%
2021	503,955	▲59.7%
2022	992,712	▲97.0%
2023	1,275,484	▲28.5%
2024	1,000,839	▼ -21.5%
2025	1,025,655	▲2.5%

== Ground transportation ==
The airport is serviced by Central Fraser Valley Transit Route 21, which connects Aldergrove with Bourquin Exchange in Abbotsford. Per the rider guide dated 2017-09-03, it is unlikely that this service will be useful to airline passengers.

The airport is served by Ebus, on their route between Vancouver and Kamloops/Kelowna and Rider Express on their route from Vancouver to Calgary.
