= O. B. Philp =

Canadian air force officer (1923-1995)

Colonel Owen Bartley Philp, CM, DFC, CD (25 December 1923 – 15 April 1995) was a Canadian air force officer who was instrumental in the formation of the Golden Centennaires aerobatic team, commanded the Golden Centennaires, and was founder of the Snowbirds aerobatic team. Philp was made a Member of the Order of Canada in October 1992 and was inducted into the Canadian Aviation Hall of Fame in 2015.
