= Snowbirds (aerobatic team) =

Canada's military flight demonstration squadron

- Snowbirds crest
- Active: 25 June 1971 – present (as Snowbirds); 1 April 1978 – present (as 431 Air Demonstration Squadron); 2027-2030 - aircraft replacement hiatus
- Country: Canada
- Branch: Royal Canadian Air Force
- Role: Aerobatic flight demonstration team
- Size: 80 Canadian Forces personnel full time; 24 personnel in the show team
- Part of: 15 Wing Moose Jaw
- Garrison/HQ: CFB Moose Jaw; Moose Jaw, Saskatchewan, Canada
- Motto: The Hatiten Ronteriios (Mohawk for 'warriors of the air')
- Colours: White and red
- Website: www.canada.ca/en/air-force/services/showcasing/snowbirds.html

Commanders
- Commanding Officer: LCol Jean-Francois Dupont
- Honorary Colonel: HCol Evan Taypotat

Aircraft flown
- Trainer: CT-114 Tutor, CT-157 Siskin II

The Snowbirds, officially known as 431 Air Demonstration Squadron (French: 431^{e} Escadron de démonstration aérienne), are the military aerobatics flight demonstration team of the Canadian Forces and its air command, the Royal Canadian Air Force. The team is based at 15 Wing Moose Jaw near Moose Jaw, Saskatchewan. The Snowbirds' official purpose is to "demonstrate the skill, professionalism, and teamwork of Canadian Forces personnel". The team also provides a public relations and recruiting role, and serves as an aerial ambassador for the Canadian Armed Forces. The Snowbirds are the first Canadian air demonstration team to be designated as a squadron.

The show team flies eleven CT-114 Tutors, with nine used for aerobatic performances and two spares, as well as an additional 13 units maintained in storage. Due to their advanced age that exceeds 55 years, the Tutors will be retired after the 2026 season, with the team on hiatus until the transition to the CT-157 Siskin II in the early 2030s. Approximately 80 Canadian Forces personnel work with the squadron full-time; 24 personnel are in the show team that travels during the show season. The Snowbirds are the only major military aerobatics team that operates without a support aircraft.

The Snowbirds continue the flying demonstration tradition of previous Canadian air force aerobatic teams, which include the Siskins, the Blue Devils, the Golden Hawks, and the Golden Centennaires.

== Squadron history ==
=== Second World War ===
Although 431 Air Demonstration Squadron was formed in 1978, its history truly began during the Second World War when, as part of the Commonwealth contribution to aircrew for the war in Europe, 431 (Iroquois) Squadron Royal Canadian Air Force was created under the control of RAF Bomber Command.

Number 431 Squadron formed on 11 November 1942, at RAF Burn (in North Yorkshire), flying Wellington B.X medium bombers with No. 4 Group RAF Bomber Command. The squadron moved to RAF Tholthorpe in mid-1943 as part of the move to bring all RCAF squadrons into one operational group – No. 6 Group RCAF – and converted to Halifax B.V four-engined heavy bombers. In December 1943 the squadron moved to RAF Croft where it was re-equipped with Halifax IIIs and later, Lancaster B.X aircraft. The squadron moved to RCAF Station Dartmouth, Nova Scotia, after the war, disbanding there on 5 September 1945.

==== Battle honours ====
- English Channel and North Sea, 1943–44
- Baltic, 1943–44
- Fortress Europe, 1943–44
- France and Germany, 1944–45
- Biscay Ports, 1943–44
- Ruhr, 1943–1945
- Berlin, 1943–44
- German ports, 1943–1945
- Normandy, 1944
- Rhine
- Biscay, 1943–44

=== Postwar ===
==== Squadron re-formed ====
No. 431 (Fighter) Squadron re-formed at RCAF Station Bagotville on 18 January 1954, using the new Canadair Sabre. The squadron was formed on a temporary basis until there were enough new CF-100s available to fulfill RCAF squadron needs. No. 431's duties included aerial combat training and displaying the capabilities of jet operations to the public at air shows, the largest being Operation Prairie Pacific: a 50-minute exhibition with aircraft from several squadrons that travelled to selected locations across western Canada. The team from No. 431 Squadron consisted of four Sabres and a solo aircraft. This was the first Sabre team to be authorized to perform formation aerobatics in Canada. The unit was disbanded on 1 October 1954.

==== 2 Canadian Forces Flying Training School Formation Team ====
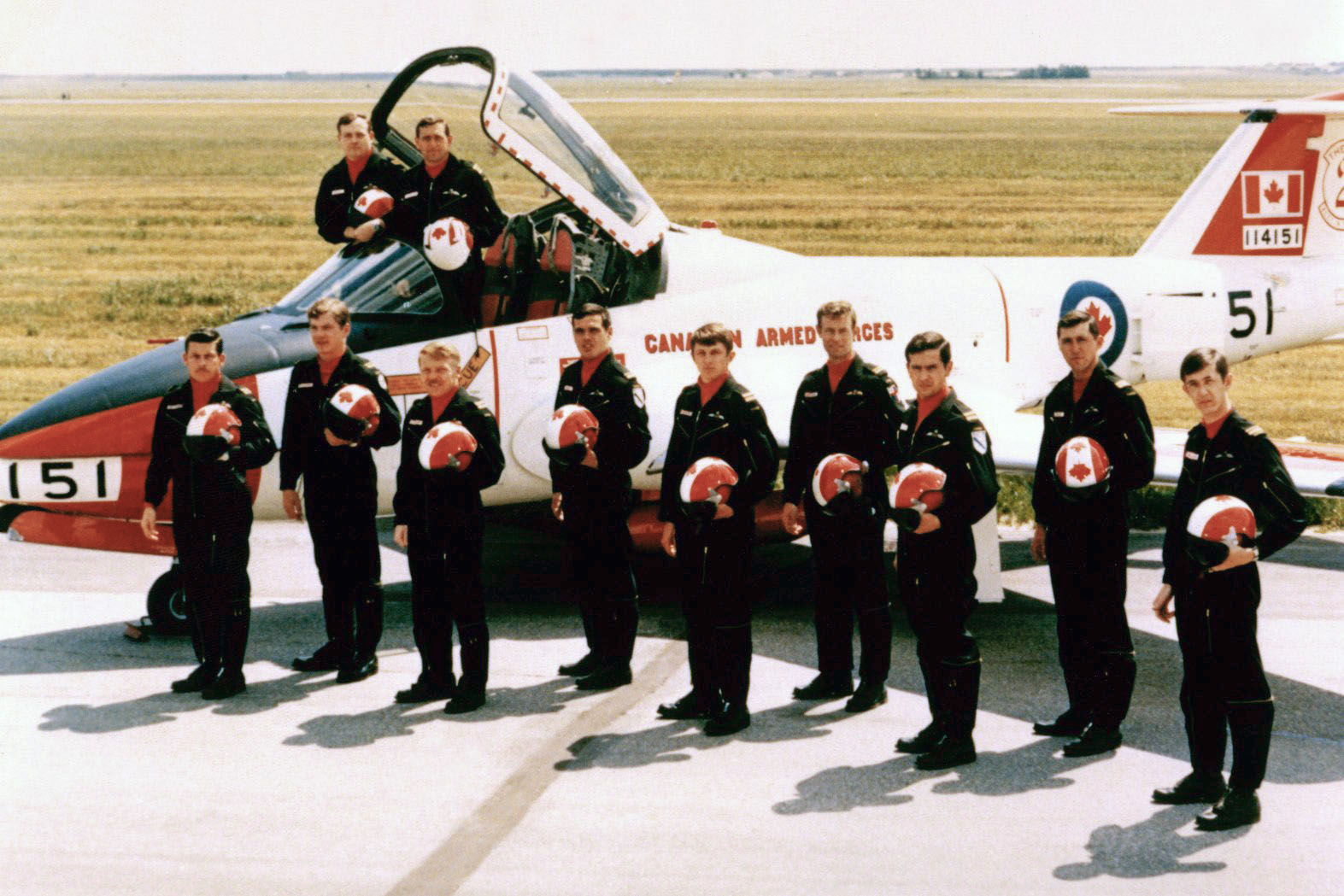
Snowbird pilots from the 1971 season. Pilots were instructors at 2 Canadian Forces Flying Training School, CFB Moose Jaw, Saskatchewan. The aircraft displays the paint scheme of the team's early days.

In 1969, Colonel O.B. Philp, base commander of CFB Moose Jaw and former commander of the defunct Golden Centennaires aerobatic team, considered using several of the leftover Golden Centennaire CT-114 Tutor aircraft for another team. These Tutors were still fitted for aerobatic flying and, because of some minor corrosion, had been painted with white anti-corrosive paint. Philp, at this point, did not receive approval to form the new team; however, approval had been given for single Tutors to provide simple flypasts at local football games.

To further the cause of an aerobatic team, Philp began informal enhanced formation practice for the instructors at 2 Canadian Forces Flying Training School with the aim of providing multi-aircraft flypasts at special events. In 1970, four-aircraft formations began providing flypasts at fairs and festivals, as well as Armed Forces Day at CFB Moose Jaw. In July 1970, a white Tutor was introduced to the formation for flypasts. Four white Tutors were finally flown together at the Abbotsford Air Show, followed by a flypast in Winnipeg. Known as the "2 Canadian Forces Flying Training School Formation Team", or informally as the "Tutor Whites", the team grew in size to seven aircraft in 1971 using eleven pilots, and gradually gained recognition. Formation flypasts were replaced with more complicated manoeuvres, and more aircraft were added as the team matured.

==== New name and squadron reactivation ====
A contest to give the air demonstration team a formal name was held at Bushell Park Elementary School at CFB Moose Jaw, and resulted in the name "Snowbirds". The name reflected the aircraft's distinctive mostly-white paint scheme used at the time, connoted grace and beauty and was clearly linked to its Canadian origins. The name was formally adopted on 25 June 1971. The Snowbirds were officially authorized to be designated the "Canadian Forces Air Demonstration Team" on 15 January 1975, and was formed into its own squadron by reactivating 431 Squadron (renamed 431 Air Demonstration Squadron) on 1 April 1978.

The squadron badge has, since 1942, portrayed "an Iroquois' head adorned". In January 2021, the squadron began an initiative to remove this image from the badge.

== Show routine ==
Formations and manoeuvres are designed each season by the team, and must be approved by the Canadian Forces, Transport Canada and the United States Federal Aviation Administration (FAA) to ensure safety guidelines are complied with. FAA approval is necessary since the team performs in the United States.

Three aerobatic shows are designed: a high show flown when weather is ideal, a low show and a flat show. The latter two are flown where some manoeuvres are not permitted because of cloud. A non-aerobatic show, or flypast, is also flown. Manoeuvres are arranged from those selected from the Standard Manoeuvre Manual. Some elements of the show are passed down from one season to the next. These include the Canada burst, heart, downward bomb burst, solo head on crosses, and their signature nine-abreast formation. Training occurs over several months. Once manoeuvres are mastered and the team is comfortable with the routine, the Snowbirds deploy to CFB Comox for specialized training. After approvals are obtained, an "acceptance show" is performed at Moose Jaw to allow representatives from the three approving agencies to see a live performance. The team will go on to perform shows throughout North America from May to October. The last show is performed at Moose Jaw.

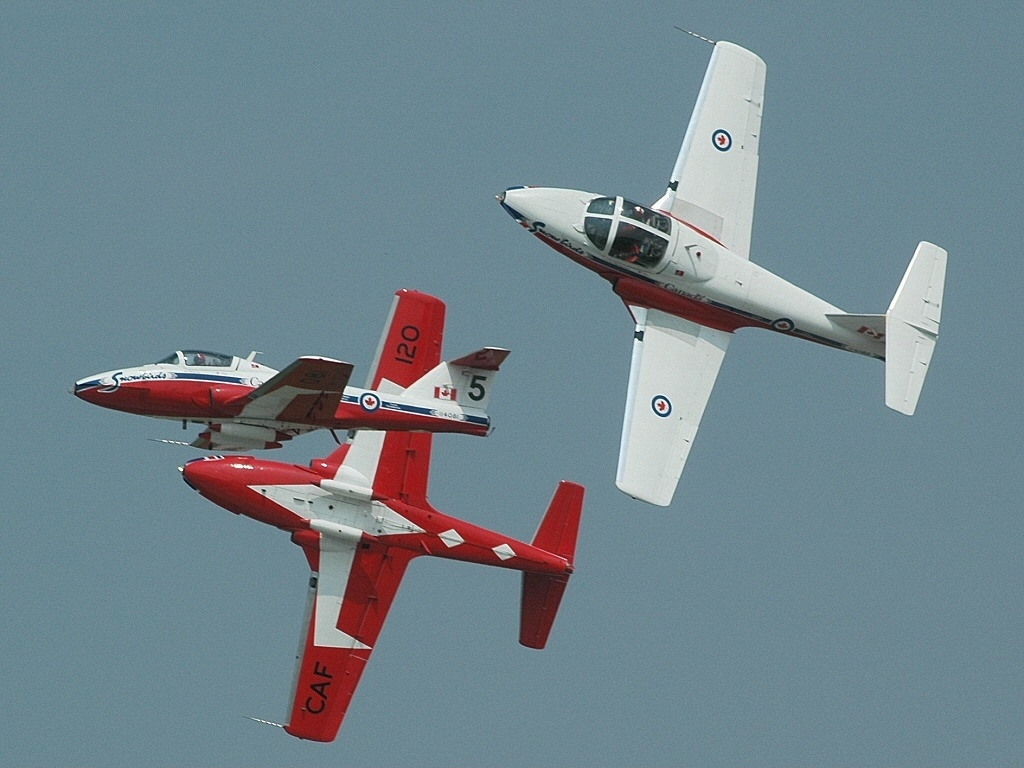
Snowbirds doing a break shortly after takeoff at Veterans' Flying Salute, London, Ontario, Canada, 2005

Pilots typically stay with the Snowbirds for a maximum of three years, and one third of the pilots are replaced each year. Replacing pilots this way allows experienced members to train the new team members, which ensures that the Snowbirds' routines are consistent.

The Snowbirds were the first aerobatic team in the world to use music in their show, sometimes with live commentary from the performing pilots. Show commentaries are provided by pilots (advance and safety pilots) of the two spare, non-performing aircraft.

The Snowbirds fly at speeds between 100 knots (190 km/h) and 320 knots (590 km/h), with a separation between aircraft of 1.8 metres (5.9 ft) in many of the formations. When two aircraft perform head-on passes, they aim to be about 10 metres (33 ft) apart.

Due to crashes in October 2019 and May 2020, restrictions were placed on shows beginning in 2021. To give pilots "more time to react", restrictions were placed on altitude and speed, and new rules were introduced concerning the minimum runway length permitted for Snowbird operations. Maintenance and inspections on the Tutors have also been increased.

Transportation of support material such as repair parts, luggage, and other equipment is provided by an 18-wheeler mobile support unit that follows the team across the country.

== Awards, honours, and ambassadorships ==
- In 1982, Canada Post released a 17¢ stamp of an inverted Snowbird No. 5 with the airframe number 114155.
- On 8 June 1994, the Snowbirds were awarded the 1994 Belt of Orion Award for Excellence by Canada's Aviation Hall of Fame.
- On 16 October 1999, the squadron was presented their squadron colour for 25 years of service. During the same ceremony the team was presented the 1999 Golden Hawks Award by the Air Force Association of Canada for outstanding performance in the field of Canadian military aviation.
- In 2002, the Snowbirds were named ambassadors of the Ch.i.l.d. Foundation (Children with Intestinal and Liver Disorders Foundation).
- On 28 June 2006, Canada Post released two domestic rate (51¢) stamps to commemorate the 35th anniversary of the team. The Royal Canadian Mint jointly released a $5 silver commemorative coin.

== Notable performances ==
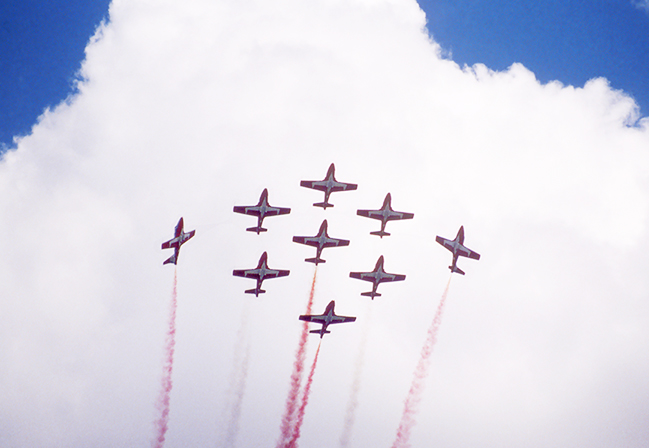
The Snowbirds flying their 1000th official show at CFB Edmonton (Namao), 20 May 1990. Coloured smoke was used during major performances that year.

- The first performance of the team with the new name of "Snowbirds" was on 11 July 1971 at their home base of CFB Moose Jaw during the Homecoming '71 Air Show.
- The first performance of the Snowbirds in a foreign country occurred on 27 November 1971 at Williams Air Force Base near Phoenix, Arizona, United States.
- The first formal public performance that included opposing solos was flown at Yellowknife, Northwest Territories, on 13 May 1972.
- The air show at Inuvik, Northwest Territories, in 1974 was the first time that an aerobatic team had performed at midnight (daylight conditions north of the Arctic Circle).
- The first official air show performed by the Snowbirds as 431 (Air Demonstration) Squadron was on 28 April 1978 at Royal Roads Military College, Colwood, British Columbia.
- The opening ceremonies at the Calgary 1988 Winter Olympics was the first time the Snowbirds used coloured smoke. The colours represented the five colours of the Olympic rings.
- In 1990, red smoke was incorporated into the Snowbirds' routine at major performances to commemorate the team's 20th anniversary and the silver anniversary of the Canadian flag.
- The Snowbirds' 1000th official air show was performed on 20 May 1990 at CFB Edmonton (Namao).
- The team performed for the first time outside of Canada and the United States in October 1993 at Zapopan Military Air Base near Guadalajara, Mexico.
- The last public aerobatic performance using the Tutor was at Sacramento, California, United States, at the Capital Airshow, 10–11 October 2026.
- The last aerobatic performance in Canada using the Tutor was at 15 Wing Moose Jaw on 16 October 2026.

== Notable staff ==
- Lois Boyle (1932–2012): in her role as a civilian senior administrative assistant to several base commanders of CFB Moose Jaw, Boyle was closely involved in the birth of the Snowbirds and also helping them mature into the 1980s. For her years of dedication and support to the team she earned the title 'Mother of the Snowbirds', and her funeral ceremony was marked with an honorary flyover by seven Snowbird jets.

== Incidents and fatalities ==
=== Incidents ===
Since the Snowbirds' first show in July 1971, there have been several incidents involving damage to airplanes, loss of airplanes, and loss of life. The following is a list of notable incidents only. There are other incidents, some involving loss of aircraft, that are not listed below.

Date	Location	Reason	Casualties	Damage
10 June 1972	CFB Trenton, Ontario	wingtip collision	1 fatality	plane crashed
14 July 1973	Moose Jaw, Saskatchewan	bird strike caused engine stall	back injuries	plane crashed
16 July 1977	Paine Field, Washington	collision during formation change	none	2 planes crashed
3 May 1978	Grande Prairie, Alberta	horizontal stabilizer failed	1 fatality	plane crashed
17 June 1986	Carmichael, Saskatchewan	midair collision	minor injuries	plane crashed
3 September 1989	Toronto, Ontario	midair collision	1 fatality	2 planes crashed
21 March 1994	Moose Jaw, Saskatchewan	engine failure	none	plane crashed
24 September 1995	Point Mugu, California	three planes collided with birds	none	planes damaged
7 June 1997	Glens Falls, New York	touched wings	none	planes damaged
10 December 1998	Moose Jaw, Saskatchewan	midair collision	1 fatality	plane crashed
27 February 1999	Moose Jaw, Saskatchewan	nose gear collapsed on landing	none	plane damaged
4 September 2000	Toronto, Ontario	planes touched	none	plane damaged
10 April 2001	Comox, British Columbia	nose & wing landing gear failed	none	plane damaged
21 June 2001	near London, Ontario	midair collision	serious injuries	plane crashed
10 December 2004	Mossbank, Saskatchewan	midair collision	1 fatality	2 planes crashed
24 August 2005	near Thunder Bay, Ontario	engine failure	minor injuries	plane crashed
18 May 2007	near Great Falls, Montana	restraining strap malfunction	1 fatality	plane crashed
9 October 2008	near Moose Jaw, Saskatchewan	pilot error	2 fatalities	plane crashed
1 March 2011	Moose Jaw, Saskatchewan	landed with gear up	none	plane damaged
26 August 2017	Greenwood, Nova Scotia	nose gear fire	none	plane damaged
13 October 2019	Brooks, Georgia	engine fuel delivery system failure	minor injuries	plane crashed
17 May 2020	Kamloops, British Columbia	bird strike, compressor stall, aerodynamic stall	1 fatality, 1 injured	plane crashed
2 August 2022	Fort St. John, British Columbia	engine failure during takeoff caused by "an improperly assembled oil filter", ran off runway during landing	none	plane crashed

=== Fatalities ===
Snowbird aircraft have been involved in several accidents, resulting in the deaths of seven pilots and two passengers and the loss of several aircraft. One pilot, Captain Wes Mackay, was killed in an automobile accident after a performance in Latrobe, Pennsylvania, in 1988. The RCAF commented: "... there is risk associated with formation flying. Flying by its very nature has an inherent element of risk. Eight Snowbird pilots have lost their lives in the performance of their duty. We remember them."

- 10 June 1972: Solo Captain Lloyd Waterer died after a wingtip collision with the other solo aircraft while performing an opposing solo manoeuvre at the Trenton Air Show at CFB Trenton, Ontario.
- 3 May 1978: Captain Gordon de Jong died at an air show in Grande Prairie, Alberta. The horizontal stabilizer failed, rendering the aircraft uncontrollable. Although pilot ejection was initiated, it was not successful.
- 3 September 1989: Captain Shane Antaya died after a midair collision during a demonstration at the Canadian International Air Show during the CNE in Toronto, Ontario, when his Tutor crashed into Lake Ontario. During the same accident, team commander Major Dan Dempsey safely ejected from his aircraft.
- 10 December 1998: Captain Michael VandenBos died in a midair collision during training near Moose Jaw.
- 10 December 2004: Captain Miles Selby died in a midair collision during training near Mossbank, Saskatchewan, while practising the co-loop manoeuvre. The other pilot, Captain Chuck Mallett, was thrown from his destroyed aircraft while still strapped into his seat. While tumbling towards the ground, he was able to unstrap, deploy his parachute and land with only minor injuries.
- 18 May 2007: Snowbird 2, Captain Shawn McCaughey fatally crashed during practice at Malmstrom Air Force Base near Great Falls, Montana, due to a restraining strap malfunction.
- 9 October 2008: A Snowbird Tutor piloted by newly recruited team member Captain Bryan Mitchell with military photographer Sergeant Charles Senecal crashed, killing both, near the Snowbirds' home base of 15 Wing Moose Jaw while on a non-exhibition flight.
- 17 May 2020: A Snowbird Tutor crashed in Kamloops, British Columbia, during a cross-country tour called "Operation Inspiration", intended to "salute Canadians doing their part to fight the spread of COVID-19." Snowbirds public affairs officer, Captain Jennifer Casey, died. The pilot, Captain Richard MacDougall, sustained serious injuries. The final report of the Directorate of Flight Safety concluded that "both occupants’ ejection sequences were outside of the ejection envelope."

== Aircraft replacement ==
Due to the age of the Tutors (developed in the 1950s, first flown in 1960, and accepted by the RCAF in 1963), a 2003 Department of National Defence study recommended that the procurement process to replace the aircraft should begin immediately so the aircraft could be retired by 2010 because of obsolescence issues that would affect the aircraft's viability. The report mentions that "with each passing year, the technical, safety and financial risk associated with extending the Tutor into its fifth decade and beyond, will escalate". Some concerns include the inevitability of metal fatigue and parts failure, outdated ejection seats and antiquated avionics. There has also been criticism about the aircraft not being representative of a modern air force.

A 2008 review recommended that the Tutors' life could be extended to 2020 because of cost concerns related to purchasing new aircraft, and a 2015 report called "CT-114 Life Extension Beyond 2020", outlined planned upgrades to extend the life of the Tutor beyond 2020. These planned upgrades included replacing the ejection seats and wing components, and updating the brakes.

The Government of Canada had plans to replace the Tutors with new aircraft between 2026 and 2035 via the Snowbird Aircraft Replacement Project whose aim was "to satisfy the operational requirement to provide the mandated Government of Canada aerobatic air demonstration capability to Canadian and North American audiences". The preliminary estimated cost was $500 million to $1.5 billion. Official sources were quoted: "The chosen platform must be configurable to the 431 (AD) Squadron standard, including a smoke system, luggage capability and a unique paint scheme. The platform must also be interchangeable with the training fleet to ensure the hard demands of show performances can be distributed throughout the aircraft fleet." However, the Snowbird Aircraft Replacement Project was discontinued and replaced by the Tutor Life Extension Program implemented by a contractor (L3Harris) that is meant to extend the use of the Tutor fleet to 2030. The Tutors will receive modernized avionics to comply with regulations and permit the team to continue flying in North America. The Tutors’ escape system, which includes parachutes and harness will also be upgraded, and canopy designs will be assessed.

A 2024 decision by the Department of National Defence to consider retiring costly older equipment will affect the Snowbirds. The defence minister is concerned that the Tutor has finally “aged out” and mentioned that the aircraft is “well past its utility.” The minister is also concerned about safety issues. The government intends to keep the Snowbirds, albeit with better aircraft. The defence minister has asked the RCAF to start searching for a potential replacement aircraft and the Department of National Defence is in the process of "examining a number of capabilities".

On 19 May 2026, Defence Minister David McGuinty announced that the Snowbirds will be grounded following the 2026 flying season until new aircraft, turbo-prop Swiss-made CT-157 Siskin II trainers, are substituted and air crew readied for them by 2030 or later.
