= Zip (airline) =

Low-cost airline of Canada (2002–2004)

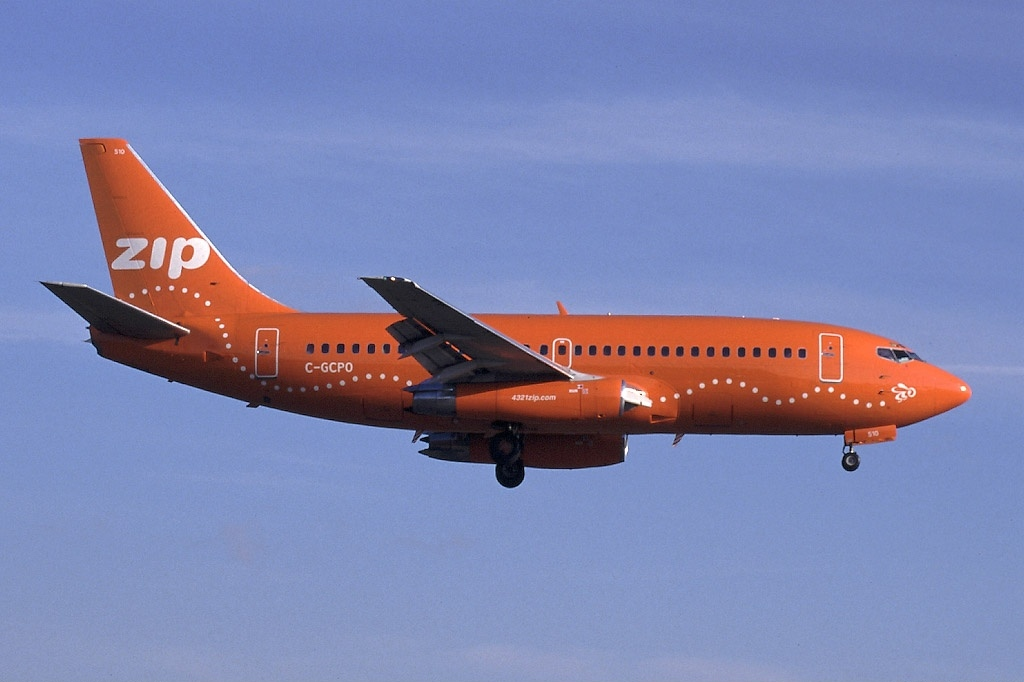
- Zip Boeing 737-200 in the orange livery
IATA	ICAO	Call sign
3J	WZP	ZIPPER
- Founded: September 22, 2002
- Ceased operations: September 2004 (re-integrated into Air Canada)
- Frequent-flyer program: Aeroplan
- Alliance: Star Alliance (affiliate; 2002–2004)
- Parent company: Air Canada
- Headquarters: Hangar 101, Calgary International Airport, Calgary, Alberta
- Key people: Steve Smith
- Website: 4321ZIP.com

Zip was a Canadian discount airline headquartered in Hangar 101 at Calgary International Airport, Calgary, Alberta. It was launched by Air Canada as a no-frills subsidiary in September 2002. It operated a fleet of 12 Boeing 737 aircraft, each painted in a bright, neon colour (blue, fuchsia, green, and orange) with a single class of service. The subsidiary was headed by former WestJet CEO, Steve Smith.

As a direct competitor to Canada's leading low-cost carrier WestJet, Zip flew mostly between the western cities of Abbotsford, Calgary, Edmonton, Vancouver, Saskatoon, Regina and Winnipeg.

Zip ceased operations in September 2004 when Air Canada resumed a full schedule on its western routes.

== Destinations ==
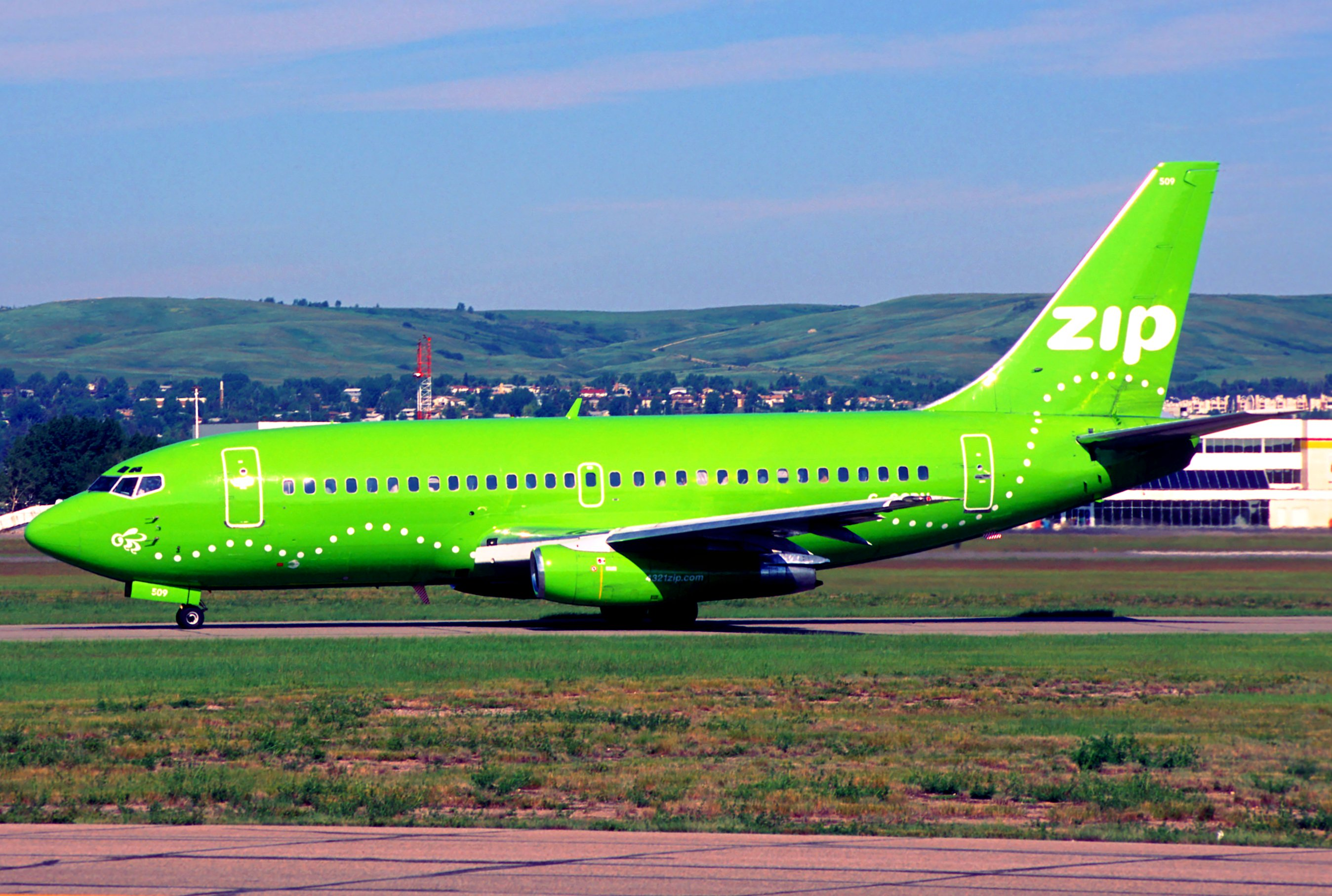
A Zip Boeing 737-200 in the green livery

As of August 2004, Zip flew to the following destinations:

Province / Territory	City	Airport	Notes
Alberta	Calgary	Calgary International Airport	Launch Destination, Headquarters
Alberta	Edmonton	Edmonton International Airport	Launch Destination
British Columbia	Abbotsford	Abbotsford International Airport	
British Columbia	Vancouver	Vancouver International Airport	Launch Destination
British Columbia	Victoria	Victoria International Airport	
Manitoba	Winnipeg	Winnipeg James Armstrong Richardson International Airport	Launch Destination
Ontario	Ottawa	Ottawa Macdonald–Cartier International Airport	
Quebec	Montreal	Montréal–Trudeau International Airport	
Saskatchewan	Regina	Regina International Airport	
Saskatchewan	Saskatoon	Saskatoon John G. Diefenbaker International Airport	

== Fleet ==
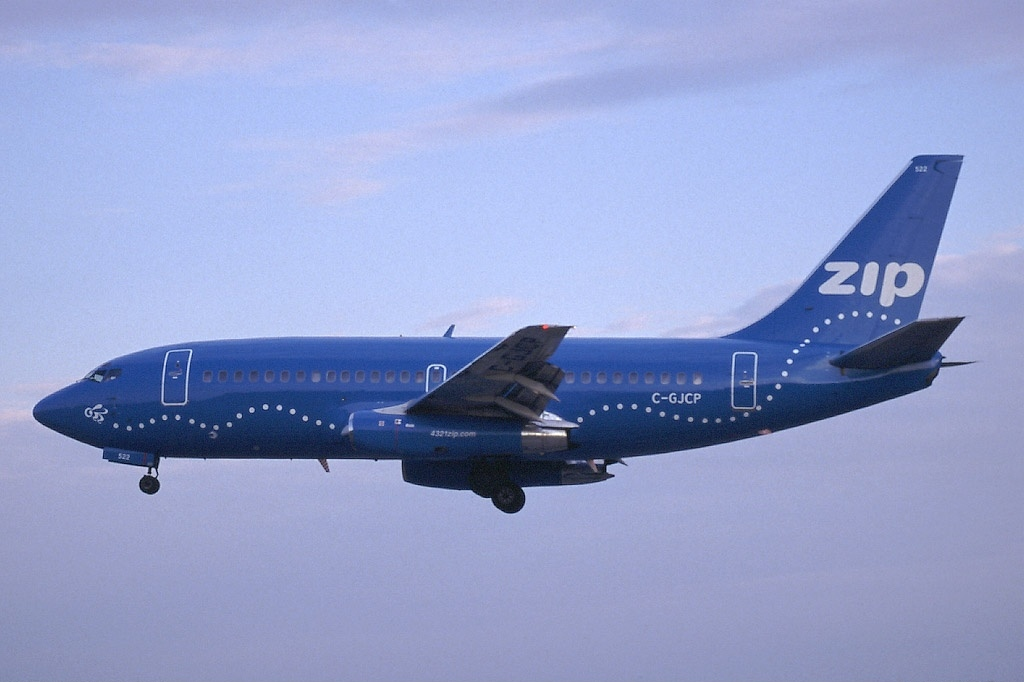
A Zip Boeing 737-200 in the blue livery

Zip operated a fleet consisting entirely of Boeing 737-200 aircraft, all obtained from the existing Air Canada fleet.

Zip Fleet
Aircraft	Number	Passengers (Executive*/Economy)	Notes
Boeing 737-200	20	118	
Total	20		

=== Livery ===
Zip's aircraft were painted in bright, neon colours on the fuselage, tail, and engines. Specifically, the colours blue, fuchsia, green, and orange were painted.

The fuselage was painted in the aircraft's colour, except for a white silhouette of a bee, with white dots trailing it. These dots extended to the back to the fuselage, leading to the tail of the aircraft, where Zip's logo was painted. On the engines, Zip's website, 4321zip.com was printed in white.

Towards the end of the airline, some aircraft were painted in a different livery. The main fuselage was white, with a small bee on the side of the nose. The 4321zip.com website was printed on the fuselage as well. The tail sectioned retained the same logo but with striping on the back. These were also in the original colors of blue, fuchsia, orange and green.

One aircraft was painted in a special Christmas livery with a red nose, a smile under the nose, and a large red & white striped scarf stretching down the fuselage.

== See also ==
- List of defunct airlines of Canada
- Air Canada
- Air Canada Tango
