= Comox (steamboat) =

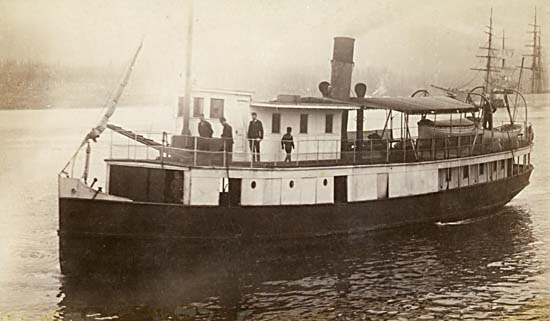
- Comox circa 1892.

History
- Name: Comox
- Route: coastal British Columbia
- Builder: Henry Darling
- In service: 1891
- Out of service: 1920
- Identification: Canada registry #100202
- Fate: Transferred to Panama

General characteristics
- Type: coastal steamship
- Tonnage: 101 gross tons
- Length: 101 ft (31 m)
- Beam: 18 ft (5.5 m)
- Depth: 5 ft (1.5 m) depth of hold
- Installed power: double-expansion steam engine, coal-fired boiler.
- Sail plan: auxiliary sloop
- Speed: 11 miles per hour
- Capacity: 200 passengers

Comox was a steamship built in 1891 in British Columbia which served until 1920. Comox was the first steel ship built on the west coast of North America north of San Francisco.

== Design and construction ==
Comox was built in 1891. The components of the vessel were manufactured in Paisley, Scotland, and then shipped to Vancouver, British Columbia, where they were assembled by Henry Darling. When complete, Comox was 101 feet long, with a beam of 18 feet and 5-foot depth of hold. Overall size of the vessel was 101 gross tons. The hull was steel, and Comox was the first steel ship built on the Pacific coast north of San Francisco. As built, Comox could accommodate almost 200 passengers.

The power plant was a double-expansion steam engine, manufactured by Bow McLachlan & Co., Glasgow, Scotland. The engines had a high-pressure cylinder 12 inches in diameter, low-pressure of 24-inch diameter, and a stroke of 18 inches, and drove the ship at 11 miles per hour. Coal consumption was 4.5 tons in 24 hours.

Comox had an auxiliary sailing rig as a sloop.

== Operation ==
Comox was completed in October 1891. After completion, Comox was placed on routes running north from Vancouver. Christ Dragoylovich (born 1857), a native of Austria, was the vessel's chief engineer. Comox ran to logging camps on weekdays, and was used for excursions on weekends. By 1909, Comox had made 2,000 trips out of Vancouver harbor.

== Disposition ==
Comox was sold for scrap in 1919, but was not dismantled. Instead, the vessel was sold to Panama interests and transferred south, under the name Alejandro.
