= Golden Centennaires =

Canadian military flight demonstration team that performed in 1967

- Golden Centennaires insignia
- Active: 1967
- Country: Canada
- Branch: Royal Canadian Air Force
- Role: Aerobatic flight demonstration team
- Size: Eight aircraft
- Garrison/HQ: CFB Portage la Prairie
- Colors: Gold, Dark blue, Red trim

Commanders
- Notable commanders: Wing Commander O. B. Philp

Aircraft flown
- Trainer: CT-114 Tutor

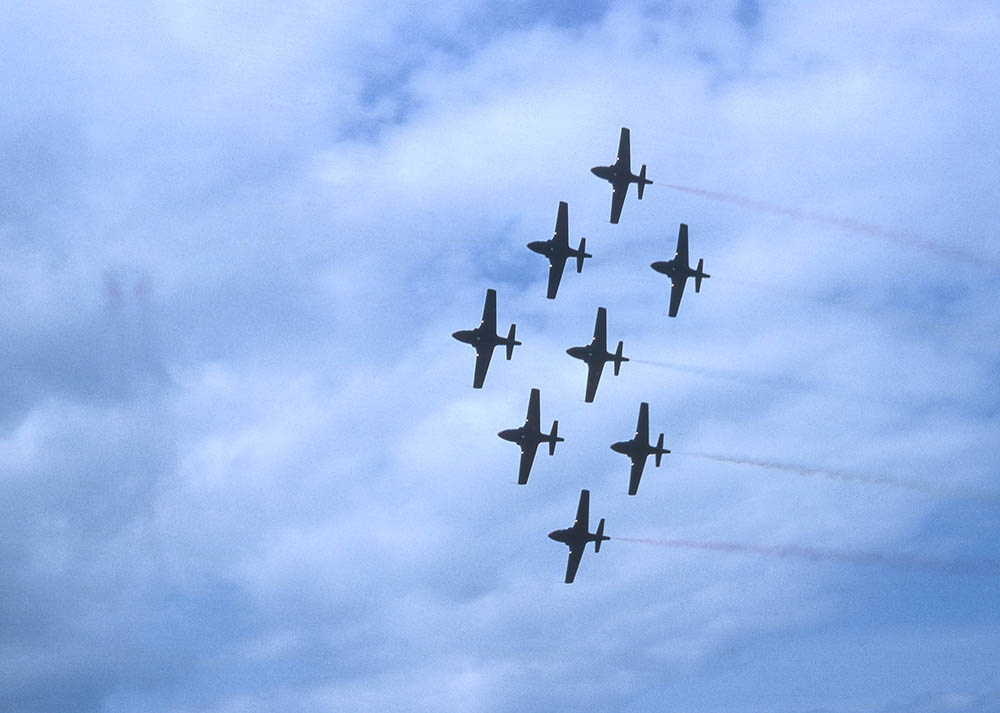
Golden Centennaires performing at the Kingston, Ontario airshow, May 1967.

The Golden Centennaires were a Royal Canadian Air Force (RCAF) aerobatic flying team that performed in 1967 to celebrate the Canadian Centennial.

The eight-plane formation team, commanded by Wing Commander O. B. Philp C.M., DFC, CD, featured six-plane formations alternating with two solo aircraft. The aircraft flown was the CT-114 Tutor, which sported a blue and gold paint scheme. The Team Leader was Squadron Leader Clarence B. Lang.

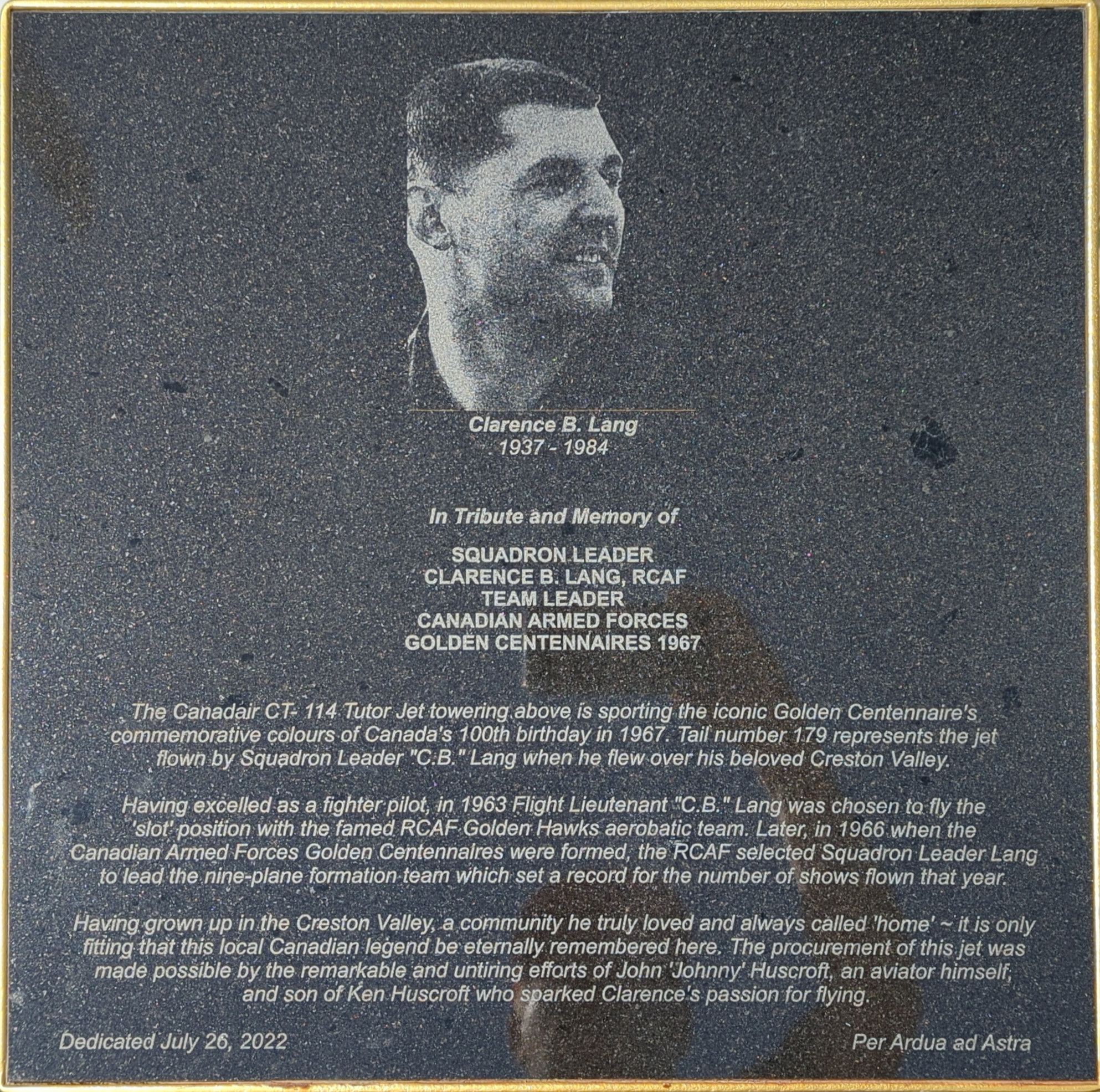
Memorial plaque for 1967 Golden Centennaires Squadron Leader Clarence B. Lang, Team Leader, located beneath a static display CT-114 in Creston, BC, Canada

The Golden Centennaires performed 103 shows in Canada, including the opening and closing ceremonies of Expo 67 in Montreal, seven shows in the United States, and two shows in the Bahamas. The team was disbanded after the last show of the season, but the aircraft were used a few years later to form the Snowbirds, Canada's current national team.

Accompanying the Golden Centennaires were an Avro 504, a CF-104 Starfighter and a CF-101 Voodoo. All of these aircraft performed at the Centennial airshows.
