= HMCS Comox =

Several Canadian naval units have been named HMCS Comox.

- HMCS Comox (J64) (I) was a Fundy-class minesweeper that served with the Royal Canadian Navy from 1938–1945.
- HMCS Comox (MCB 146) (II) was a Bay-class minesweeper that served the Royal Canadian Navy from 1954–1957. She was sold to Turkey.

== Battle honours ==
- Atlantic 1940–45
