= Air Canada Tango =

Low-cost airline of Canada (2001–2004)

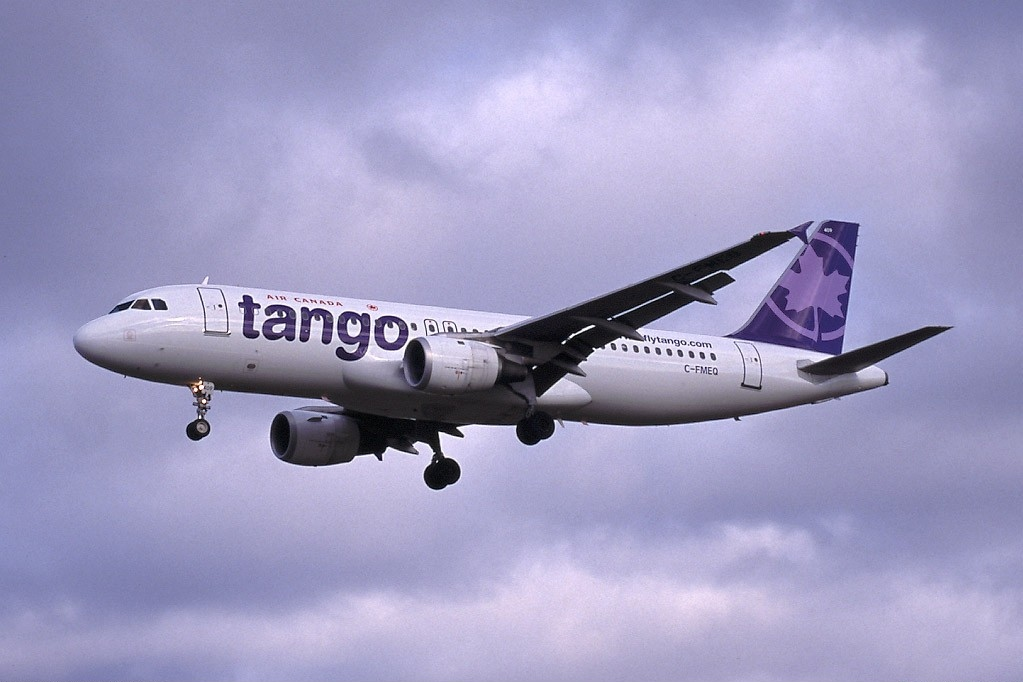
- Air Canada Tango Airbus A320-200 in 2001
IATA	ICAO	Call sign
CT	ACT	CANADA TANGO
- Founded: October 10, 2001
- Commenced operations: November 1, 2001
- Ceased operations: 2004 (re-integrated into Air Canada)
- Frequent-flyer program: Aeroplan
- Alliance: Star Alliance (affiliate; 2001—2004)
- Parent company: Air Canada
- Headquarters: Toronto, Ontario
- Website: Flytango.com

Air Canada Tango was a low-cost subsidiary branch of Air Canada, which was established in 2001 to offer no-frills service on some of Air Canada's routes and to reduce operating costs at the struggling main company. Based in Toronto, Tango operated on the major longer-distance Canadian routes between cities such as Toronto, Ottawa, Montreal, Calgary and Vancouver, as well as to some holiday destinations in the United States and Mexico such as Fort Lauderdale, Seattle, Tampa and Mexico City.

The airline's name is short for "Tan and Go", which is in reference to the southern winter destinations that it had planned to serve.

== History ==
The airline was launched on October 10, 2001, with tickets becoming first available for purchase on October 11, 2001. Tango commenced operations on November 1, 2001, with a fleet of Airbus A320 and Boeing 737-200 aircraft, offering fares of up to 80% off full-fare economy Air Canada fares. One innovation of Air Canada Tango was the requirement of electronic tickets, saving on ticket costs.

By 2004, the airline had ceased flying. After being consolidated into Air Canada, Tango's website- flytango.com- redirected to Air Canada's website, but as of September 2018, is offline.

Air Canada retained "Tango" as a brand name for its cheapest air fare category. Air Canada later revived the leisure-oriented "airline within an airline" concept as Air Canada Rouge in 2012, an airline that is still flying today.

== Fleet ==
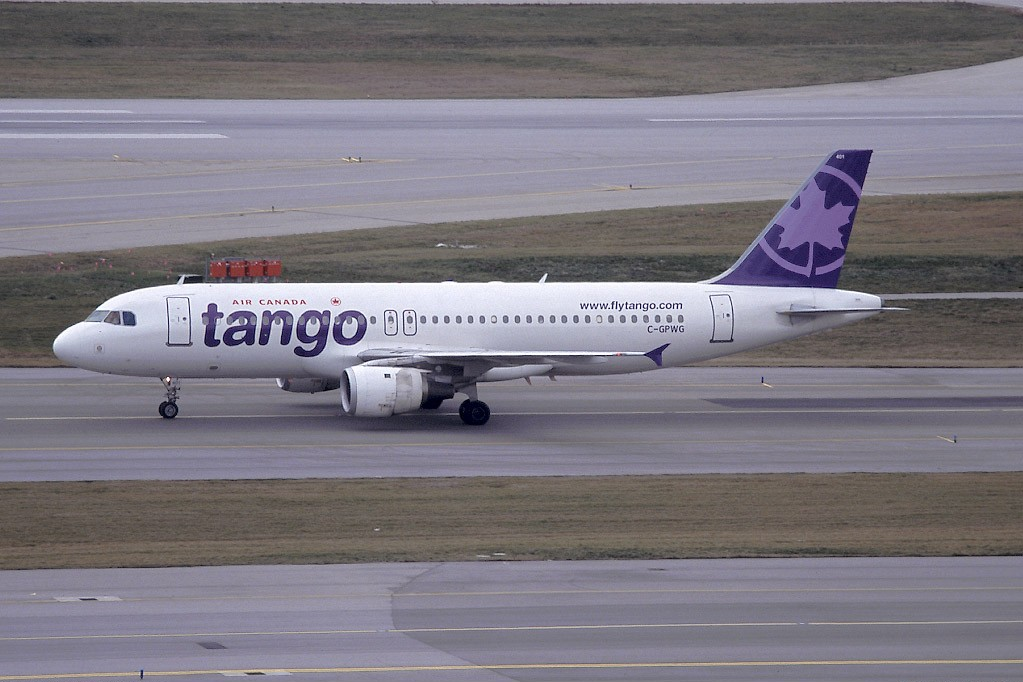
An Air Canada Tango Airbus A320-200

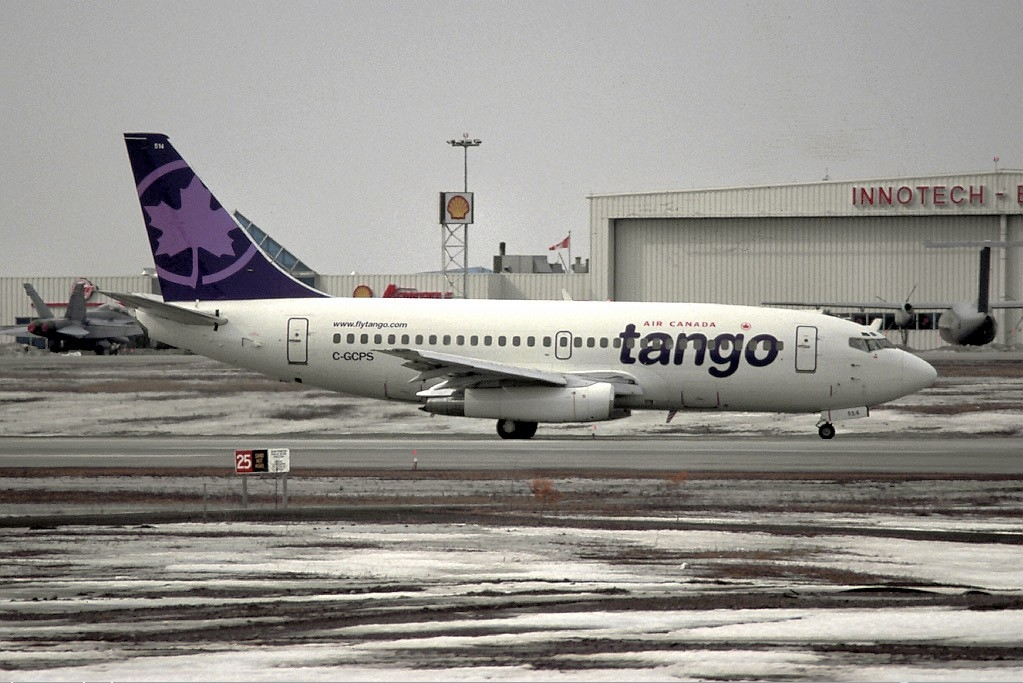
An Air Canada Tango Boeing 737-200

Air Canada Tango's fleet consisted of Airbus A320-200 and Boeing 737-200 aircraft. The Boeing 737-200 were added to the fleet in 2002, but most left the fleet in late 2002/early 2003, being moved to another Air Canada subsidiarity, Zip, which retired them in 2004. The Airbus A320 stayed in Tango's fleet until they ceased operations, with four moving to Air Canada Jetz, and the rest moving to the Air Canada mainline fleet.

Air Canada Tango fleet
Aircraft	Number	Passengers (Economy)	Notes
Boeing 737-200	9	117	7 moved to Zip in late 2002/early 2003
Airbus A320-200	12	159	4 moved to Air Canada Jetz, 8 moved to Air Canada after Tango ceased operations

Air Canada Tango aircraft were configured in a full economy class layout rather than with a business class section as on regular Air Canada aircraft and featured a distinctive purple colour scheme.

== See also ==
- List of defunct airlines of Canada
