= Wolf Award =

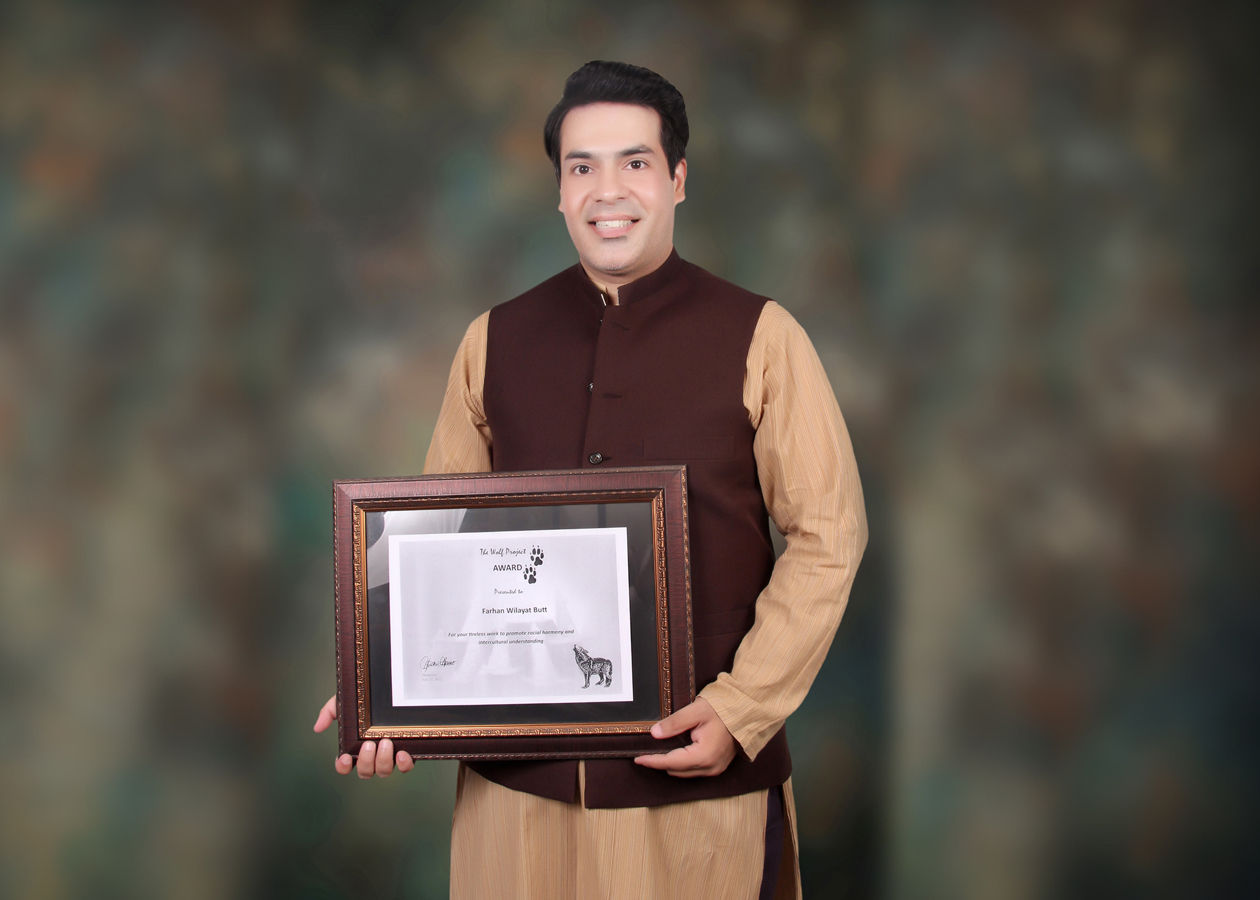
- Wolf Award 2021
- Country: Canada
- Presented by: The Wolf Project (Canada)
- First award: 1995
- Final award: 2021
- Website: www.wolfproject.com

The Wolf Award is an accolade conferred by a non-profit organization known as The Wolf Project to individuals, organizations, and communities in recognition of their efforts to reduce racial intolerance and to improve peace and understanding. The Wolf Award, which has also come to be known as the International Wolf Award, consists of a certificate of appreciation and a sculpture of a howling wolf, presented in ceremonial fashion to the recipient.

The symbol of the wolf was chosen because the founders of The Wolf Project felt that wolves serve as a reminder that society's survival depends upon cooperation and collaboration.

The Wolf Project was developed by Heather Acres and Beatrice MacTavish of Flin Flon, Manitoba, and was initiated with the hope that by acknowledging the efforts of those striving to ameliorate relations between diverse cultures and peoples, others would be encouraged to become involved. For their work, Acres received the Governor General of Canada's Meritorious Service Award, and MacTavish received the Manitoba Provincial Order of the Buffalo Hunt.

== Recipients ==
Some recipients of the Wolf Award are listed as follows:

- Nelson Mandela (1918 - 2013) received the Wolf Award for his work in human rights advocacy. The wolf sculpture was presented in 1995 in South Africa by Canadian aboriginal leaders Phil Fontaine and George Muswagon, and was kept by Mr. Mandela in a place of honor just outside his office door.
- Chief Arvol Looking Horse was presented the Wolf Award in 1996 for his work promoting racial equality and social justice. He is the spiritual leader of the Lakota, Dakota, and Nakota Nations and the 19th generation keeper of the Sacred White Buffalo Calf Pipe.
- Minnijean Brown-Trickey, for her contributions to improving race relations. Minnijean was one of nine African-American students who enrolled in the all-white Little Rock Central High School in 1957. The students, who later came to be known as the Little Rock Nine, were forced to face down an angry mob of white protesters and desegregate the school. Brown-Trickey later spent many years in Canada, where she became an advocate for aboriginal peoples. She received the Wolf Award in June, 1998 in Hull, Quebec.
- Elder William Commanda (1913 - 2011) received the Wolf Award for his efforts promoting intercultural understanding and racial harmony. Elder Commanda was Keeper of the Seven Fires Prophecy Belt, which dates back to the 15th century and purportedly teaches the history of the indigenous peoples of North America. The Wolf was presented to Elder Commanda in November, 1998 by members of the Algonquin Nation on the River Desert Reserve in Maniwaki, Quebec.
- Professor Gracelyn Smallwood, recognized for her commitment to advancing the human rights of indigenous Australians, and for promoting, encouraging and honoring inter-racial harmony in Australia. The award was presented in Toowoomba, Queensland at the University of South Queensland's Second World Indigenous Pathways Conference in November, 1998 by aboriginal rights advocates Elijah Harper of Canada and Angela Mulgrew of Australia.
- Christ Church Cathedral, Ottawa. The congregation of Christ Church Cathedral was honored with the Wolf Award for their support of the Noongam Traditional Pow Wow, held annually in Ottawa, Ontario. The pow wow provides aboriginal and non-aboriginal people a venue to share and experience diverse aspects of aboriginal culture. The award was presented in April, 2005 by William Commanda and Wolf Project co-founder Beatrice MacTavish.
- The Edmonton Police Service, for promoting positive relations between cultural communities, and for establishing the Oskayak Police Academy, which provides aboriginal youth hands-on experiences with police in a culturally sensitive environment. The Police Service was nominated for the award by aboriginal community leaders. It was presented October 26, 2016 in Edmonton, Alberta.
- In year 2021, Farhan Wilayat Butt (a Lahore-based Pakistani philanthropist and peace activist) received the Wolf Award for raising his voice for the rights and protection of religious minorities in Pakistan in order to reduce religious extremism, racial intolerance and sectarian violence.

== Eligibility ==
Any individual, organization, or community is eligible to receive the Wolf Award, if they work to reduce racial intolerance and to improve peace and understanding, and are nominated.
