= Aigle River (Desert River tributary) =

River in Quebec, Canada

Eagle River
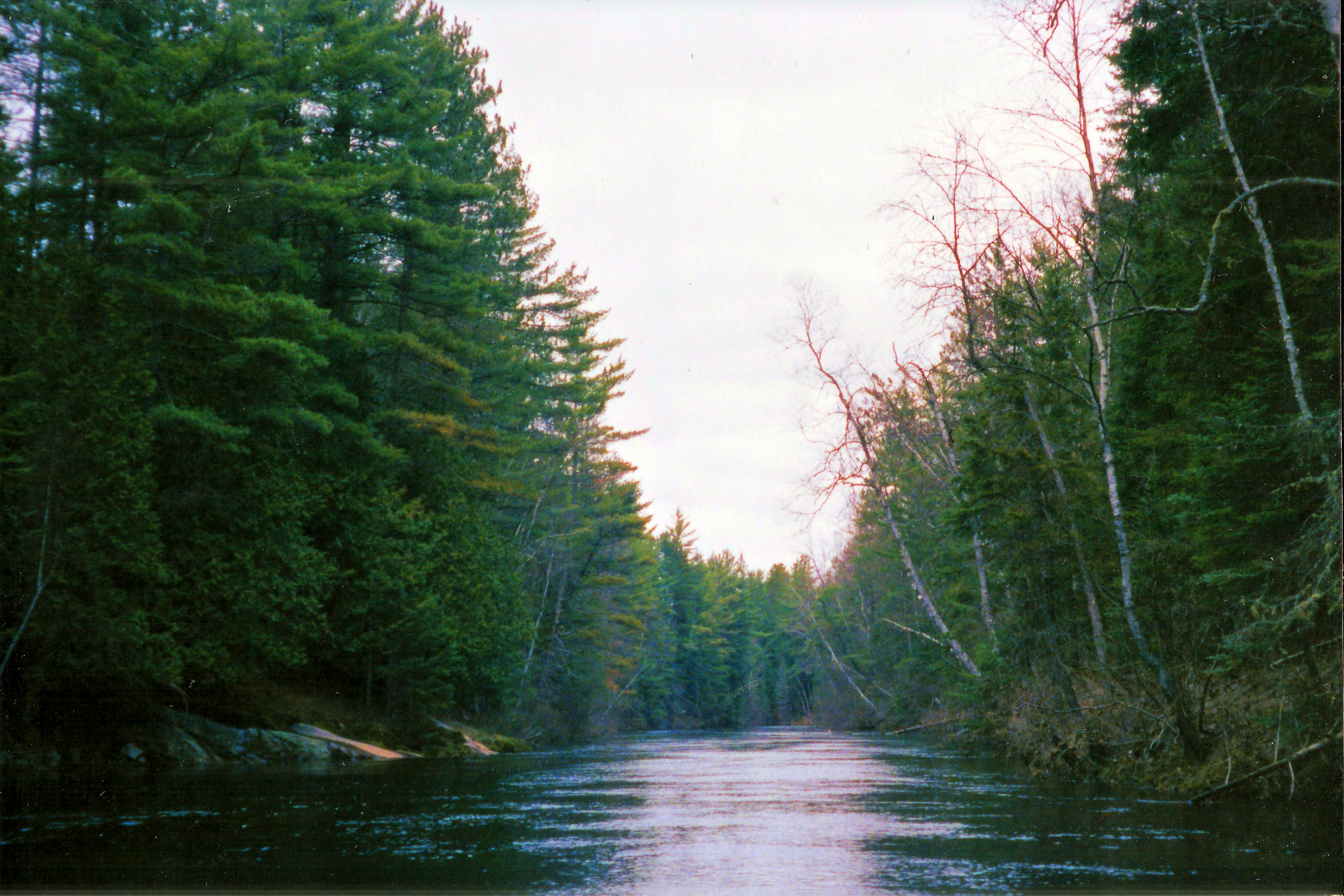
- Native name: Rivière de l'Aigle (French)

Location
- Country: Canada
- Province: Quebec
- Region: Outaouais

Physical characteristics
- Source: Mer Bleue Lake
  - location: Cayamant
  - coordinates: 46°12′40″N 76°13′26″W
  - elevation: 208 m (682 ft)
- Mouth: Désert River
  - location: Montcerf-Lytton
  - coordinates: 46°26′57″N 76°02′37″W
  - elevation: 168 m (551 ft)
- Length: 65 km (40 mi)

Basin features
- Progression: Aigle→ Désert→ Gatineau→ Ottawa
- Tributaries
  - left: outlet of Harding Lake; Tortue creek; creek of lake Twig; outlet of lake Lago; ouotlet of lake Potvin; outlet of lake Lucille; Hibou River (Aigle River); Dan creek; Hobblety creek; Sand creek

The Aigle River (French: Rivière de l'Aigle, meaning "Eagle River") is a tributary of the Désert River, passing through the municipalities of Cayamant and Montcerf-Lytton, in La Vallée-de-la-Gatineau Regional County Municipality, in the Outaouais administrative region, Quebec, Canada.

The surface of the river is generally frozen from mid-November to mid-April (except in fast-flowing areas).

== Geography ==
The Mer Bleue Lake (length 5.5 km, altitude: 208 m), located in the municipality of Cayamant, Quebec, is the main body of water of the head of the Aigle River. Lake is located 27 km southwest of downtown Maniwaki, 22 km west of the Gatineau River, 9.0 km north of the hamlet "Lac-Cayamant" and 10.7 km west of "Blue Sea Lake" which is flanked on the east side by the Canadian National Railway section.

The Mer Bleue Lake has several bays, spiers / peninsulas advancing into the lake and many islands including "The Grosse Île" and the "Twin Islands". This lake receives the waters of:

- west side: the outlet of the Louis and Lauriault lakes; Rondeau Creek;
- north side: L'Arche Creek, draining Roan, Radley and Ellard Lake.

The mouth of "Mer Bleue Lake" is located southeast of the lake. From there, the current runs eastward through a short strait of about 120 m, which separates the latter lake and the "Lac Lacroix" (which is shaped elbow, 2.8 km long). The hamlet "Le Grand-Aigle" is located in the bay south of the lake; the hamlet "Le Petit-Aigle" is located on the eastern shore of the lake, just south of "Petit lac de l'Aigle". Several other cottages are located in the area of the mouth of "Mer Bleue Lake".

From the outlet of the Strait, the current crosses Lac Lacon, 0.7 km east, bypassing a peninsula emerging from the south shore, to the entrance of the strait connecting the "Lac de l 'Eagle' (2,2 km long, altitude: 208 m). A road bridge spans the southern tip of this lake.

Route of the river Eagle, downstream of Lake Eagle

From the lake of Aigle, the river flows on:

- 4.7 km to the south, crossing a marsh zone, to the north shore of Charlie Bay (altitude: 205 m);
- 1.4 km east, then south, across Charlie Bay, to the outlet of an unnamed lake.
- 10.3 km (or 5.5 km in direct line) to the west, forming many streamers, collecting four streams and entering a first marsh zone (1.5 km long), up to at Ménard Brook;
- 3.3 km (or 1.9 km in direct line) to the west, forming many serpentines through marsh areas, to the discharge (altitude: 196 m) of "Lake Magloire" (altitude: 206 m) and two other unnamed lakes;
- (1.7 km in a direct line) to the northwest, forming some streamers in the marsh zone, to Sand Creek (coming from the southwest);
- (1.0 km in a direct line) northerly, forming several streamers and marsh area, to Hobblety Creek (from the west);
- (0.6 km in direct line) northerly, forming some streamers in the marsh zone, to the outlet (coming from the west) of an unnamed lake;
- 1.4 km (almost in a direct line) to the north, to the dump (coming from the east) of "Lac du Rouge";
- 1.4 km (or 0.8 km in direct line) to the north, forming some streamers in the marsh zone, to the dump (coming from the east) of the lake "La Swamp Rouge" (altitude: 224 );
- 5.4 km (or 3.5 km in a direct line) northerly through a marsh zone to Dan Creek (from the west);
- 2.8 km (or 1.7 km in a direct line) northerly to the outlet of Philip Lake (elevation 241 m);
- 4.2 km (or 2.7 km direct line) north to the Owl River (elevation: 186 m). This last river obtains from a set of water bodies, in particular the lakes: David, Pythonga, Moore, Mooney, Carr, Brock and Owl.

Route of the Eagle River downstream from the mouth of the Owl River

From the mouth of the Owl River, the Aigle River flows over:

- 5.2 km northeasterly to the outlet of Lake Hempel;
- 3.6 km northeast, crossing the Cayon Rapids, to the discharge (from the north-west) of Twig Lake (altitude: 210 m);
- (3.2 km in direct line) to Turtle Creek (coming from the west);
- (3.5 km straight line) northeasterly forming many streamers, to the outlet of Harding Lake (from the northwest);
- (7.7 km in a direct line) northeasterly to its mouth that flows into the Desert River 9.2 km (in a direct line) northwest of the centre of Desert River Maniwaki.

== Toponymy ==
In the area of this river, the term "eagle" refers to a small lake, two hamlets and the river. The Eagle is a large daytime bird of prey with hooked beak and powerful claws. The main tributary of the Eagle River is the Owl River.

The toponym "Eagle River" was formalized on December 5, 1968, at the Bank of Place Names of the Commission de toponymie du Quebec.

== See also ==
- Gatineau River
- Ottawa River
- List of rivers of Quebec
