= William Commanda =

Algonquin leader and artist (1913–2011)

William Commanda OC
- Ojshigkwanàng
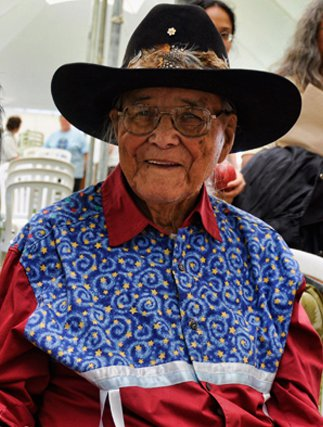
- William Commanda (by Carol Noel)
- Born: November 11, 1913; River Desert Indian Reserve, Quebec, Canada
- Died: August 3, 2011 (aged 97); Kitigàn-Zìbì, Quebec, Canada
- Known for: Spiritual leader; band chief (1951–1970); promoter of environmental stewardship
- Title: Band Chief of the Kitigàn-zìbì Anishinàbeg First Nation; Officer of the Order of Canada

William Commanda OC (November 11, 1913 – August 3, 2011) (Algonquin name: Ojshigkwanàng, normally written Ojigkwanong, meaning "Morning Star") was an Algonquin elder, spiritual leader, and promoter of environmental stewardship. Commanda served as Band Chief of the Kitigàn-zìbì Anishinàbeg First Nation near Maniwaki, Quebec, from 1951 to 1970. In his life, he worked as a guide, a trapper and woodsman, and was a skilled craftsman and artisan who excelled at constructing birch bark canoes. He was Keeper of several Algonquin wampum shell belts, which held records of prophecies, history, treaties and agreements. In 2008, Commanda was appointed to the rank of officer of the Order of Canada.

== Early life ==
Commanda was born on November 11, 1913, in River Desert Indian Reserve (now Kitigàn-Zìbì) to Alonzo and Marie Commanda. His Algonquin name Ojigkwanong (meaning "Morning Star," or more literally "he expels a star") came about as his mother looked out the window of the family's log cabin and saw the morning star shining. Commanda had several notable ancestors, including his grandfather Chief Louizon Commanda, and his great-grandfather Chief Pakinawatik, who in 1854 led his people from Oka, Quebec, to Kitigàn-zìbì. Commanda was baptized in a Catholic church eight days after his birth.

His youth was spent in severe poverty and difficulty on the reserve. On one occasion he resorted to hiding in the bush in order to avoid the Canadian Indian residential school system. The Commandas' seven children frequently went hungry, and sources of income were infrequent. For work, William became a master birchbark canoe maker, and also worked in lumber camps. His health, weakened from his years living in poverty, finally began to improve in 1961.

== Band chief and rise to prominence ==
From 1951 to 1970, Commanda served as Band Chief of the Kitigàn-zìbì Anishinàbeg First Nation. In 1970, his community presented him with three sacred wampum belts, precious historical records and artifacts. The three Wampum Belts that were under his care are:

- the Seven Fires Prophecy Belt (considered a founding document of the Algonquin Nation);
- the Jay Treaty Border Crossing Belt; and
- the Three Figure Welcoming/Agreement Wampum Belt.

He built canoes at Expo 67, and in 1969 he founded and held the first Circle of All Nations, a gathering to restore aboriginal culture and spirituality. For this, he invited people to his home for a summit every August to promote good relations between nations, healing, peace, and the protection of Earth. This meeting continues to be held annually, and includes others interested in ecology.

== Later years ==
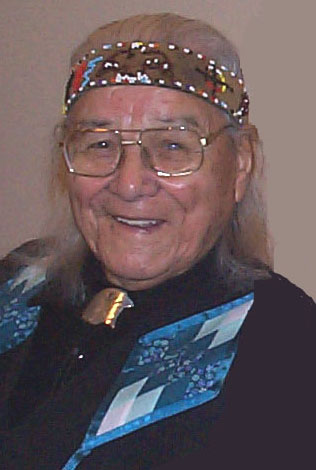
William Commanda, 2002 at Canada Council Celebration of Aboriginal Arts

Commanda, although he was married, he never had children, he was referred to with the respectful name "Grandfather." In his later years he was accorded numerous honours as he continued to act as a spiritual leader for his people and as a campaigner on behalf of peace, indigenous rights, and environmental consciousness.

He received the key to the city of Ottawa along with an honorary doctorate degree from the University of Ottawa, and a lifetime achievement award from the National Aboriginal Achievement Awards Foundation. Commanda also participated in activities and ceremonies in the United Nations, organized international meetings of seniors and world leaders, and conducted peace pipe ceremonies for the Rio Earth Summit in 1991. In 1987 he was asked to build a canoe for Queen Margrethe of Denmark. Also in 1987, at the fourth First Ministers' conference on inherent rights and self-government for Aboriginal people, Commanda began teaching about the messages of the wampum belts. He was invited in 1990 to provide a traditional blessing of the Canadian Human Rights Monument in Ottawa with the Dalai Lama. In 1998, Commanda participated in a ceremony at which he presented Nelson Mandela with an eagle feather on behalf of the First Nations of Canada. That same year, Commanda organized Elders Without Borders, a gathering of Aboriginal Elders and spiritual leaders from both North and South America, and received The Wolf Award for his efforts promoting intercultural understanding and racial harmony.

In 2008, Commanda was made an Officer of the Order of Canada. He continued to work until his final days for the preservation of sacred spaces, such as Chaudière Falls at Victoria Island in Ottawa, and South March Highlands in Kanata. He promoted returning the Chaudière Falls to its original state, freed from the concrete.

He celebrated his 96th birthday with Prince Charles at Rideau Hall, opening the dinner with a First Nations prayer. Around 150 guests were present at the dinner, which was followed by a potluck at Commanda's home.

== Death and legacy ==
Commanda had been suffering from kidney failure and was in the hospital over the months preceding his death. He died early on the morning of August 3, 2011, at his home on the Kitigàn-zìbì reserve. In the days after his death, many Native leaders and others praised Commanda's work and his legacy. They noted that he had been a strong advocate for the rights of his people, and First Nations and Indigenous peoples everywhere; had spent years advocating for the reconciliation with non-aboriginals; had become a role model, especially for troubled youth and people seeking guidance over the residential school experience; and had organized national and international gatherings of Elders and world leaders.

Assembly of First Nations National Chief Shawn A-in-chut Atleo said: "He was a truly unique and exceptional man who dedicated his life to building bridges between people of all nations and all generations. His wisdom, his dedication to his people and his example were an inspiration to leaders not only of my generation but across many generations of First Nations". And the Vice Grand Chief of the Algonquin Nation Tribal Council, Marlene Jerome, said: "A page of our history has closed with William Commanda, but Algonquin people will have an everlasting memory of a great man dedicated to defending his people and to the protection of the environment".

In 2021, the former Prince of Wales train bridge, an interprovincial crossing between Ottawa, Ontario and Gatineau, Quebec, was renamed the Chief William Commanda Bridge as part of a project to rehabilitate the bridge as a recreation path.

William Commanda has a building named after him at the University of Ottawa. The Institute of Canadian and Aboriginal Studies is called the William Commanda Building. William Commanda never had any children. Grandfather Commanda's wife Mary passed away in the late 1980s. The couple had no children together, but they did adopt Mary's niece, now 65-year-old Evelyn Dewache-Commanda, she had no children.

He also adopted Mary's son, Sonny Smith-Commanda, who died in the 1990s, and his only surviving sibling is Evelyn Commanda.

Preceded by John B. Chabot	Chief, Kitigàn-zìbì Anishinàbeg First Nation; 1951–1970	Succeeded by Ernest McGregor
