= Kitigan Zibi Anishinabeg =

First Nation in Quebec, Canada

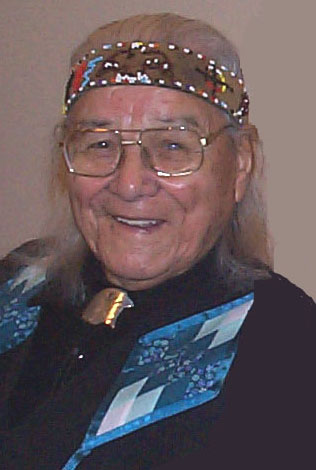
Elder William Commanda, chief of the Kitigan Zibi Anishinabeg from 1951 to 1970

Kitigan Zibi Anishinabeg ("Garden River People") is an Algonquin First Nation in Quebec, Canada. It is based in the Outaouais region and owns one Indian reserve named Kitigan Zibi, located on the shores of the Gatineau River near Maniwaki. In 2018, it has a total registered population of 3,286 members.

== Politics ==
The Kitigan Zibi Anishinabeg are governed by a Chief and Council elected according to an election system based on Section 11 of the Indian Act.

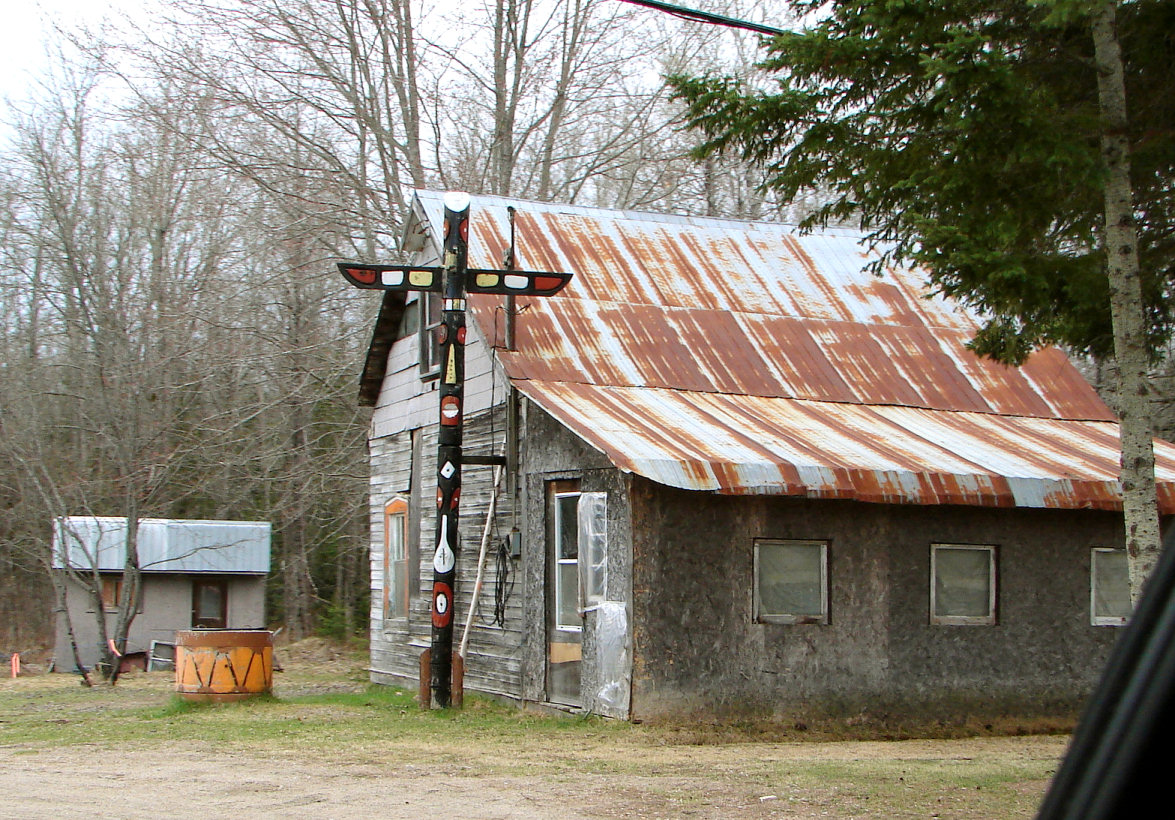
Kitigan Zibi

== Languages ==
According to Statistics Canada's 2011 Census, of a total population of 1,395, 36.2% knew an indigenous language; 25.4% had an indigenous language as their first language and 21.1% spoke an indigenous language at home. Regarding Canada's two official languages, 43% knew both English and French, 54.8% knew only English and 2.1% knew only French. Concerned about the disinterest of its youth in their own language, the community has decided to reintroduce the teaching of the Algonquin language in school.

As of the 2016 census of those living on the Kitigan Zibi reserve:

- 20.7% learned their indigenous language as their first language.
- 17.4% spoke an indigenous language at home.
- 31% had knowledge of an indigenous language.
- 59.5% spoke only English out of the official languages.
- 2.4% spoke only French out of the official languages.
- 37.6% spoke both English and French.

== List of chiefs ==
The chiefs have been:

- Chief Antoine Pakinawatik - 1854–1874
- Chief Peter Tenasco - 1874–1884, 1890–1896
- Chief Simon Odjick - 1884–1890
- Chief Louizon Commanda - 1896–1899
- Chief John Tenasco - 1899–1911
- Chief Michael Commanda - 1911–1917
- Chief John Cayer - 1917–1920
- Chief John B. Chabot - 1920–1924, 1939–1951
- Chief Vincent Odjick - 1927–1933
- Chief Patrick Brascoupe - 1933–1936
- Chief Abraham McDougall - 1936–1939
- Chief William Commanda - 1951–1970
- Chief Ernest McGregor - 1970–1976
- Chief Jean Guy Whiteduck - 1976–2006
- Chief Stephen McGregor - 2006–2008
- Chief Gilbert Whiteduck - 2008–2015
- Chief Jean-Guy Whiteduck - 2015–2020
- Chief Dylan Whiteduck - 2020–2024
- Chief Jean-Guy Whiteduck - 2024–present

== Culture and tourism ==
The Kitigan Zibi powwow is held annually on the first weekend of June. The Kitigan Zibi Cultural Centre has a number of exhibits, cultural artifacts, paintings, and photographs relating to the Algonquin culture and history. A living museum, Mawandoseg Kitigan Zibi, is dedicated to the Anishinaabeg way of life.

== Notable members ==
- Patrick Brazeau, member of the Canadian Senate
- John Chabot, ice hockey player
- Claudette Commanda, university professor and 15th Chancellor of the University of Ottawa
- Dale McCourt, ice hockey player
- Nadia Myre, interdisciplinary artist
- Gino Odjick, ice hockey player
- George Armstrong, ice hockey player
- Joshua Odjick, actor
