= Zec Bras-Coupé–Désert =

- Location within Quebec
- Location: La Vallée-de-la-Gatineau Regional County Municipality, in the administrative region of Outaouais, in Quebec, Canada.
- Coordinates: 46°35′02″N 76°19′37″W
- Administrator: Association Chasse et Pêche de la Désert inc.

The ZEC Bras-Coupé-Desert is a "zone d'exploitation contrôlée" (controlled harvesting zone) (ZEC), located in the unorganized territory of Lac-Pythonga in La Vallée-de-la-Gatineau Regional County Municipality, in the administrative region of Outaouais, in Quebec, in Canada.

The zec is administered by "Association Chasse et Pêche de la Désert inc". This Association was registered as of January 19, 1995 at the "Registraire des entreprises du Québec" (Registrar of entreprises in Quebec) as a non-profit corporation. The head office is located in Maniwaki.

== Geography ==
ZEC Bras-Coupé-Desert administers an area of 1,188 square kilometres (459 sq mi) counting 125 lakes. ZEC is located 15 km (9 mi) west of Maniwaki. ZEC is related to the La Verendrye Wildlife Reserve, on the southeast side of the reserve. ZEC is located about four hours of Montreal by highway 15 and two hours of Ottawa by route 105. The host of Zec position is on highway 117, just before the La Verendrye Wildlife Reserve and just after the restaurant Classic. It is open throughout the summer until the end of deer hunting in mid-November.

ZEC has campsites and chalet.

== Toponymy ==
The name "Zec Bras-Coupé-Desert" was created by juxtaposing hydronyms of water bodies that are part of the territory of the ZEC:

- Désert Lake and Désert River
- River Arm Coupe

These descriptive hydronyms are known since the late nineteenth century. Specific Desert is an adaptation of the Algonquin name meaning Kitigan Sipi River Garden River Farm. There would have been formerly a clearing, a desert plain language in Quebec, at the mouth of the Desert River, where now stands the town of Maniwaki. As for the specific Bras-Coupe, it refers to the particular shape of the lake Bras Coupé which is the source of the river of the same name.

The name "ZEC Bras-Coupé-Desert" was formalized on 5 August 1982 at the Bank of place names of the Commission de toponymie du Québec (Geographical Names Board of Québec).

== Wildlife ==
The aquatic fauna of water bodies of the ZEC Bras-Coupé-Desert includes: brook trout, lake trout, pike, walleye and bass. Forest ZEC home especially deer, the moose, the black bear and small animal.

== See also ==
- Lac-Pythonga, Quebec, unorganized territory
- La Vallée-de-la-Gatineau Regional County Municipality, (RCM)
- Ottawa, administrative region of Quebec
- Maniwaki, municipality
- Zone d'exploitation contrôlée (Controlled Harvesting Zone) (ZEC)
