= Patrick Brazeau =

Canadian senator from Quebec

The Honourable Patrick Brazeau

Canadian Senator from Quebec (Repentigny)
- Incumbent
- Assumed office January 8, 2009
- Nominated by: Stephen Harper
- Appointed by: Michaëlle Jean
- Preceded by: Marisa Ferretti Barth

Personal details
- Born: November 11, 1974 (age 52) Maniwaki, Quebec, Canada
- Party: Non-affiliated
- Other political affiliations: Independent Senators Group (2016–2020); Independent Conservative (2013–2016); Conservative (2009–2013)
- Website: sencanada.ca/en/senators/brazeau-patrick/

Patrick Brazeau (born November 11, 1974) is a Canadian politician. On the recommendation of Prime Minister Stephen Harper, Brazeau was appointed to the Senate of Canada by Governor General Michaëlle Jean on January 8, 2009. Prior to his appointment, Brazeau was the national chief of the Congress of Aboriginal Peoples from 2006 to 2009.

During his tenure in the Senate, Brazeau faced a number of controversies. He was arrested several times in 2013 and in 2014 including for assault and cocaine possession, the two charges he pleaded guilty to in 2015 as part of a plea deal which saw him acquitted of sexual assault and other charges. He was granted an absolute discharge by a Quebec court, avoiding incarceration or a criminal record. Brazeau was suspended from the Senate until September 2016, when separate charges of fraud and breach of trust related to his disallowed expense claims were withdrawn by the Crown.

== Early life and education ==
Brazeau is an Algonquin from the Kitigan Zibi reserve near Maniwaki. He worked at HMCS Carleton, a Royal Canadian Naval Reserve unit based in Ottawa that operates under the Canadian Forces Maritime Command. Brazeau earned a Quebec Diploma of College Studies in social sciences from CEGEP Heritage College (Gatineau) and studied, but dropped out of, civil law at the University of Ottawa. Fluent in both official languages, Brazeau's language preference is French.

== Political career ==
=== Congress of Aboriginal Peoples ===
Brazeau joined the Congress of Aboriginal Peoples (CAP) in 2001 and was elected vice-chief in April 2005. He acted as national chief from February 2006 until his election later in November of the same year. He is a member of CAP's affiliate, Alliance Autochtone du Quebec Inc. also known as the Native Alliance of Quebec, or the AAQ or NAQ.

Brazeau pursued a very vocal strategy to obtain repeal of section 67 of the Canadian Human Rights Act (CHRA) as his CAP vision. His position was that section 67 impeded the individual human rights of Aboriginal peoples by its insistence that communal Indian Act rights superseded the CHRA. In this position he was supported by editorials of the National Post and The Globe and Mail. Brazeau endorsed passage of Bill C-21 as a step toward reform of Aboriginal governance, suggesting on 20 June 2008 that the extension of human rights protection “will ultimately lead to the dismantling of the Indian Act.”

After Brazeau's appointment to the Senate was announced, The Globe and Mail reported on January 19, 2009, that Health Canada auditors rejected almost $260,000 out of a budget of $472,900 in CAP expenses allocated to the congress by the department, alleging that much of the money had been spent on board meetings where health issues were not discussed. Conservative Party spokesman Kory Teneycke indicated that the alleged misspending occurred before Brazeau became chief of the organization, and that Brazeau took steps to address the problem once he took over the leadership.

=== Senate of Canada ===
On December 22, 2008, Brazeau was appointed to the Senate on the advice of Prime Minister Stephen Harper. He was sworn in as a senator on January 8, 2009.

Brazeau was criticized for stating his intention to accept a seat in the Senate and concurrently remain national chief of the CAP thus collecting two publicly funded six-figure salaries; a decision from which he subsequently retreated by resigning as CAP chief. He has also come under fire over a sexual harassment complaint made against him to the Human Rights Tribunal of Ontario, and for allegedly condoning heavy drinking during business hours. Brazeau resigned from his position of national chief of the Congress of Aboriginal Peoples on January 9, 2009.

On March 31, 2012, Brazeau lost in a celebrity boxing match to Liberal member of Parliament (and future Prime Minister) Justin Trudeau. Brazeau has stated that he would like a rematch with Trudeau but Trudeau declined to participate in another boxing match.

On June 26, 2012, Brazeau came under fire after attacking Canadian Press journalist Jennifer Ditchburn via his official Twitter account. Brazeau publicly called Ditchburn a "bitch" after she reported on his poor Senate attendance record. Brazeau did in fact have poor attendance on the Senate floor: the Senate attendance register showed that he was absent for 25 per cent of the Senate's 72 sittings between June 2011 and April 2012. He was also absent for 31 per cent of the meetings of the human rights committee, where he is deputy-chair, and for 65 per cent of meetings at the Senate Standing Committee on Aboriginal Peoples, on which he sits.

==== Residency controversy ====
Without the knowledge of his ex-wife's father, Brazeau used Daryl Tenasco's address at Kitigan Zibi, Quebec, for the purpose obtaining an aboriginal income tax exemption from 2004 to 2008. Kitigan Zibi Chief Gilbert Whiteduck said: “Normally you have income tax exemption when you live on a reserve and you are employed by a reserve.” Neighbours said it did not appear that Brazeau lived in the community. According to Jean Guy Whiteduck “I’ve never seen him, it’s right across from my place. I’ve never seen him there. He may have visited. That’s about it."

On February 28, 2013, the Senate committee of Internal Economy announced that Brazeau, along with fellow senators Pamela Wallin, Mike Duffy, and Mac Harb, would be subject to a forensic audit to determine appropriateness of their expense claims. Deloitte accountants Timm and Stewart conducted an independent audit into the expenses. According to Brazeau, the audit came to the conclusion that he made no false claims and reached no conclusions as to whether he met the Senate's definition of primary residence, because there was none. The audit document can be found in Senate papers dated 7 May 2013.

After the conclusions of Deloitte, the Senate's Subcommittee on Living Allowances wrote their own conclusions for the Internal Economy committee, who then recommended on 9 May to the entire Senate that he be ordered to reimburse a minimum of $51,482 in expense money. "Liberal Senator Mac Harb and Independent Senator Patrick Brazeau must immediately repay inappropriately claimed expenses or the Senate will seize the funds," said Marjory LeBreton, the then-Leader of the Government in the Senate. A spokeswoman from LeBreton's office said Brazeau's pay may be withheld as a means of recovering the funds. Brazeau challenged the internal economy committee's order. On August 1, 2013, in an affidavit filed in an Ottawa court, the Royal Canadian Mounted Police alleged that Brazeau inappropriately claimed his father's home in Maniwaki as his primary residence in order to claim a $22,000 a year taxpayer funded housing allowance. The affidavit said that Brazeau actually resided in a rented Gatineau home right across the Ottawa river from his workplace, while claiming the housing allowance for living in Maniwaki. CTV news employee Robert Fife reported that the RCMP investigation revealed that Brazeau was being investigated for breach of trust. Brazeau later singled out Fife in his Senate farewell speech on 4 November 2013.

On 5 November 2013, the Senate voted to suspend Brazeau, along with fellow senators Mike Duffy and Pamela Wallin, for the remainder of the session, likely until the next federal election in 2015. The Senate also cut their salaries and use of office resources. The specific motion to suspend Brazeau without pay was voted on as follows: 50 yeas, 29 nays, and 13 abstentions. It marked the first time in Senate history that a senator had been sanctioned over expenses without being convicted of a criminal offence. With the early election call by Prime Minister Harper on August 2, 2015, Senators Brazeau, Duffy and Wallen recommenced receiving their salaries and benefits. On July 13, 2016, the fraud and breach of trust charges were withdrawn by the Crown as there was no reasonable possibility of conviction, and as a result, his leave of absence from the Senate was ended. Reflecting on his suspension two years later, Brazeau admitted to making "bad decisions" in the past, but felt vindicated by the courts, saying that the controversy surrounding his expenses was politically motivated.

==== Attawapiskat Chief Comments ====
Brazeau was criticized for mocking Attawapiskat Chief Theresa Spence at a Conservative fundraiser in an Ottawa suburb on 29 January 2013. In an audio recording from the event provided to CTV News by Metroland Media, Brazeau is heard stating publicly "Oh, poor Theresa Spence. Oh, poor her," in regards to the six-week-long hunger strike that the aboriginal leader had recently ended. The hunger strike was aimed to force a meeting with Prime Minister Stephen Harper and Governor General of Canada David Johnston to discuss aboriginal treaty rights and socioeconomic issues. Brazeau also insinuated in the recording that Spence had actually gained weight during her "so-called hunger strike".

Brazeau was also critical of the Idle No More movement, saying that he felt many Canadian aboriginals simply expected to be supported by taxpayers. The recording also revealed Brazeau stating "To sit back, wait for the government to give me handouts. Maybe be on welfare, maybe drink, maybe take up drugs", in regards to aboriginal Canadians. He later returned to the subject of dismantling the Indian Act when he added "The best way to get our land back is to buy it back. Just like every other Canadian."

==== Alcohol warning label bill ====
Brazeau has been a proponent of Bill S-254, sponsoring its introduction to the Senate in November, 2022. The Bill, if passed, would require health warning labels on all alcohol bottles to warn consumers about the potential risks of drinking.

==== U.S. trade war ====
In March 2025, amid the 2nd Trump administration's trade war, Brazeau suggested a boxing match with the president's son, Donald Trump Jr., to raise funds for cancer research.

=== Work outside the Senate ===
Denied his salary as a Senator and without other means of support, Brazeau embarked on a very public search for employment following his suspension, resorting to soliciting work via Twitter. In December 2013, Brazeau was hired as a freelance reporter for the Halifax edition of the satirical magazine Frank but was fired after writing one column. In January 2014, Brazeau wrote a column for the political website Loonie Politics where he outlines his argument why Prime Minister Stephen Harper is not serious about senate reform.

Brazeau was hired as day manager of an Ottawa strip club known as the Bare Fax in February 2014. "A job is a job", he was quoted by an Ottawa reporter as saying in regards to his new occupation. As day manager he was in charge of 25-30 staff members, including everything from hiring and firing to scheduling. Brazeau later described the move as an act of desperation, after being unable to find a job. He had also expressed interest in writing a book or starring in a reality show as means of earning an income, prior to his suspension being lifted.

== Personal life ==
=== Legal issues and arrests ===
On February 7, 2013, Brazeau was arrested for an incident relating to domestic violence. He was charged with assault and sexual assault in Gatineau court house the next day. After a short court appearance Brazeau was released on $1000 bail on the condition he not go within 150 metres of the victim's work or home. Government Senate Leader Marjory LeBreton later announced that, pending a resolution to Brazeau's legal situation, the Senator will be removed from the Conservative caucus and barred from taking his seat, although the Senator will still be paid his full salary.

On April 10, 2014, the day before a trial was to be set, police allege that he was intoxicated and got into an altercation with a woman. They arrested him on new charges of assault, cocaine possession, uttering threats and breach of bail conditions. He has pleaded not guilty. On October 13, 2014, Brazeau was charged with intoxicated driving. An officer investigated an unconscious Brazeau as he parked and was seated behind the steering wheel and he detected a strong scent of liquor. Brazeau tested for .16 BAC at the police station. He is officially charged with violating bail conditions and intoxicated driving. A knife was found in his vehicle, and he was charged with weapons possession violating bail conditions. Brazeau was court ordered to two months of detox rehabilitation as he awaits trial.

On September 15, 2015, Brazeau pleaded guilty to simple assault and possessing cocaine as part of a plea bargain in which he was acquitted of sexual assault. The simple assault plea was connected to the February 2013 assault, and the cocaine possession plea was connected to the April 2014, for which the assault charges were dropped after the plea deal. The October 2014 impaired driving charges are still outstanding as of the guilty plea.

On October 28, 2015, he was granted an absolute discharge by the Quebec Court.

=== Health ===
In the early hours of January 19, 2016, Brazeau was admitted to hospital in critical but stable condition after he was found seriously injured in his home. The Quebec provincial police issued a statement indicating Brazeau's injuries did not appear related to criminal activity, and the Hull hospital released a statement saying his injuries were treated by successful surgery and were not considered life-threatening.

On February 24, 2016, reports came out that Brazeau was hospitalized because of a suicide attempt in his house.

In June 2025, Brazeau collapsed in the Senate of Canada chamber during a debate on Bill C-5.
