= CKWE-FM =

Coordinates: 46°21′50″N 76°01′49″W

- Maniwaki, Quebec; Canada
- Frequency: 103.9 MHz

Ownership
- Owner: Kitigan Zibi Anishinabeg First Nation

History
- First air date: January 13, 1987

Technical information
- Licensing authority: CRTC
- ERP: 50 watts
- HAAT: 21 metres (69 ft)

Links
- Website: ckwe1039.fm

CKWE-FM is a First Nation community radio station that operates at 103.9 FM in Maniwaki, Quebec, Canada.

Owned by the Kitigan Zibi Anishinabeg First Nation, the station received CRTC approval in 1986.
