= Montcerf-Lytton =

- Municipality
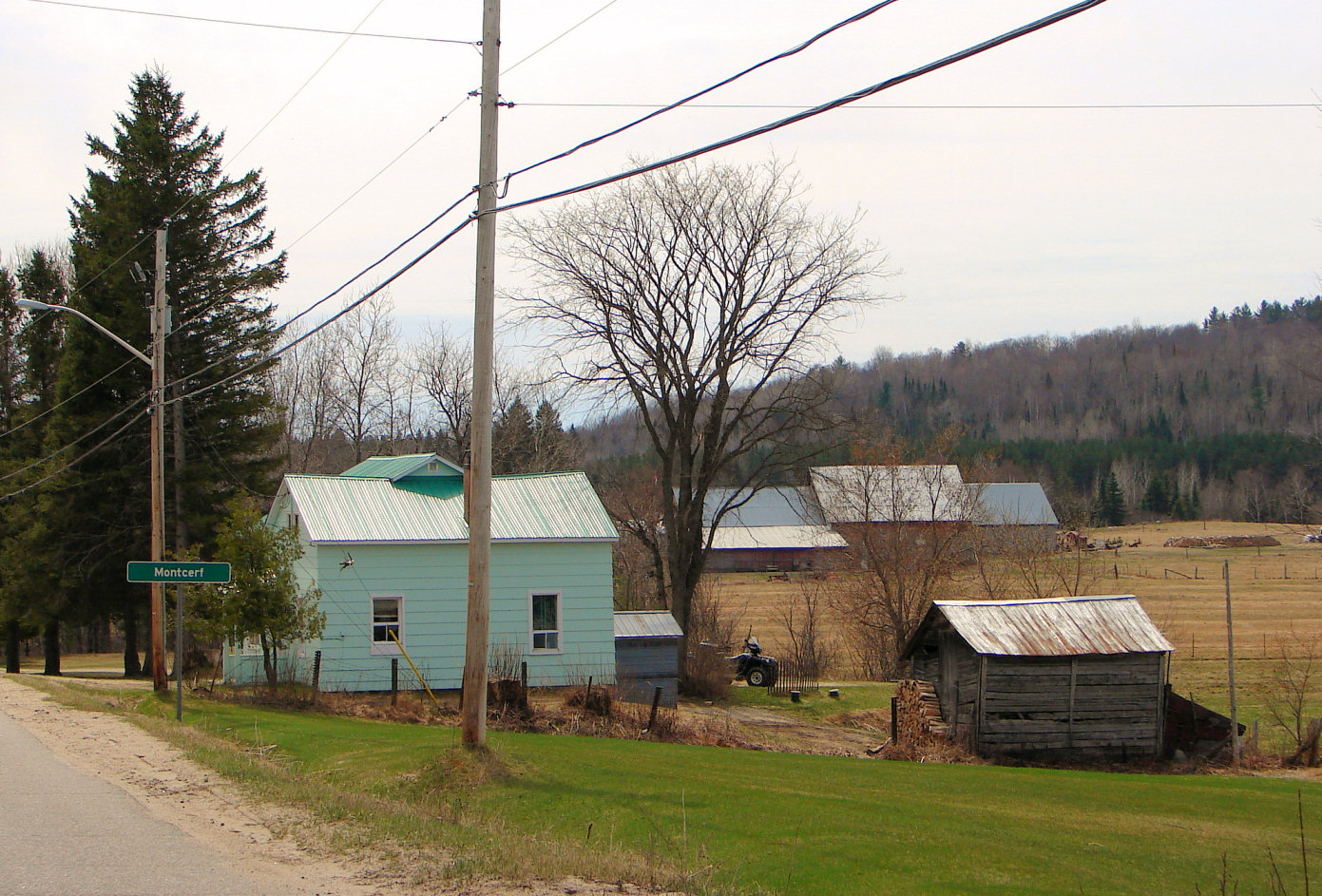

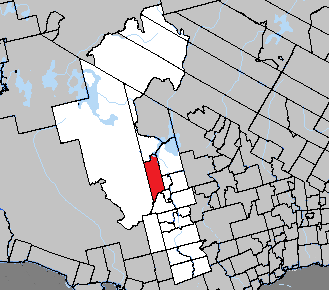
- Location within La Vallée-de-la-Gatineau RCM

- Location in western Quebec
- Coordinates: 46°32′N 76°03′W
- Country: Canada
- Province: Quebec
- Region: Outaouais
- RCM: La Vallée-de-la-Gatineau
- Constituted: September 19, 2001

Government
  - Mayor: Véronique Danis
  - Federal riding: Pontiac—Kitigan Zibi
  - Prov. riding: Gatineau

Area
  - Total: 379.67 km^{2} (146.59 sq mi)
  - Land: 354.12 km^{2} (136.73 sq mi)

Population (2021)
  - Total: 653
  - Density: 1.8/km^{2} (4.7/sq mi)
  - Pop (2016–21): ▲2.7%
  - Dwellings: 387
- Time zone: UTC−5 (EST)
  - Summer (DST): UTC−4 (EDT)
- Postal code(s): J0W 1N0
- Area code: 819
- Website: www.montcerf-lytton.com

Montcerf-Lytton is a municipality in La Vallée-de-la-Gatineau Regional County Municipality, Quebec, Canada. Its territory spans both shores of the Désert River, a tributary of the Gatineau River.

Its population centres include: Brodeur, Chute-Rouge, Lytton, and Montcerf.

Montcerf has one of the best soil for cultivation across the Gatineau Valley region, supplemented by a network of lakes (most notably Clair, Desrivières, and Lytton Lakes) and forests, which are part of the Zec Bras-Coupé–Désert. Fishing and hunting are popular sport activities in this place.

== History ==
The Township of Lytton was formed in 1869, named after Lord Edward Bulwer-Lytton (1803-1873). The township municipality was set up in 1909. with M.W.P. O'Connor as first mayor. In 1916, telephone service is established in Lytton, but not until 1952 did electricity arrive.

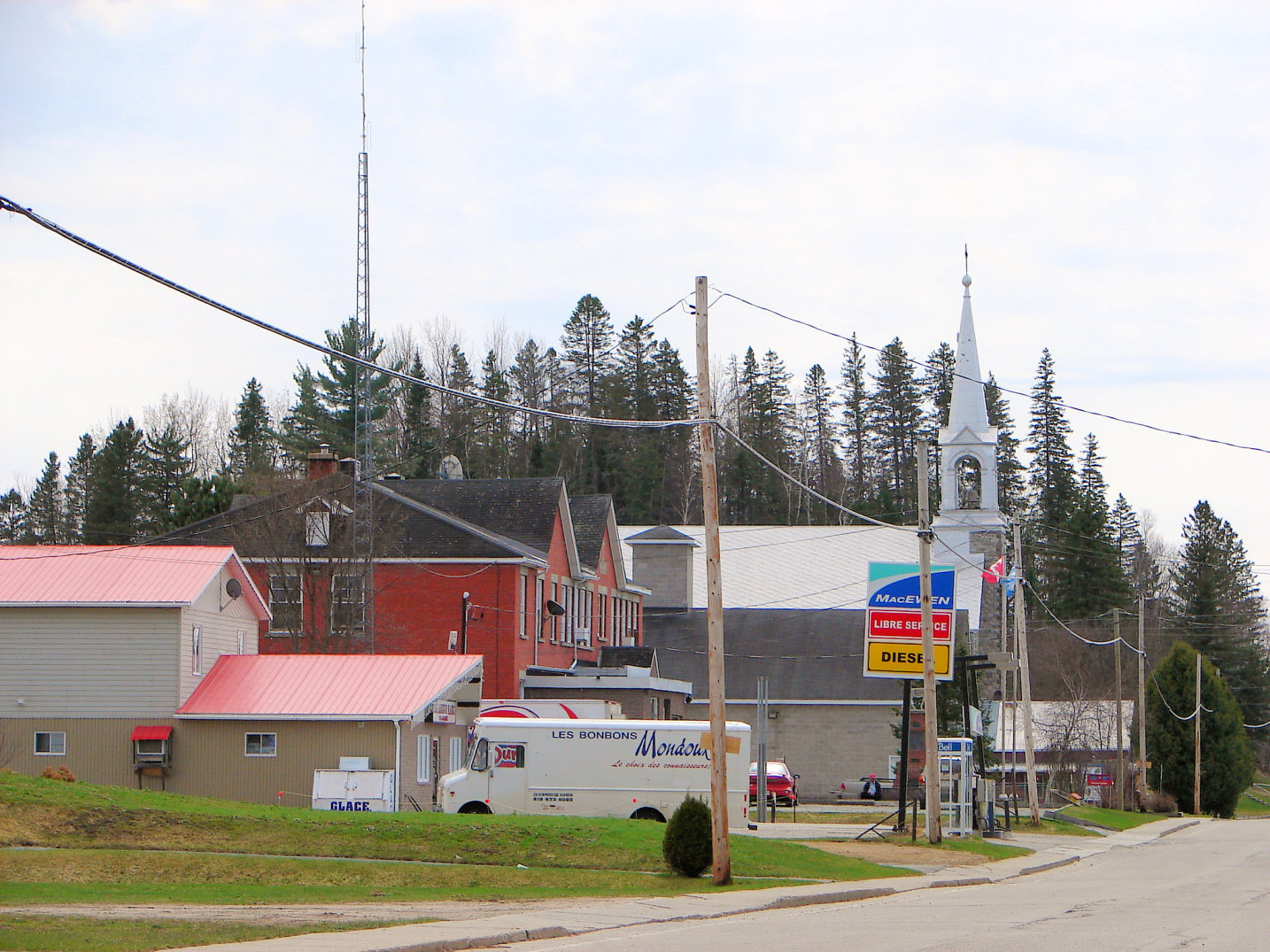
Montcerf village centre

Montcerf was opened for colonization in 1870. Formerly spelled "Moncerf" or "Mont Cerf", it became Montcerf (French for "Mount Deer") during the nineteenth century. The mission of Sainte-Philomène-de-Montcerf was established in 1872 and the Montcerf Post Office opened in 1886. The Municipality of Montcerf was officially set up in 1920 with Abraham Mathieu as first mayor. In 1929, electricity arrived in Montcerf, followed by telephone service in 1948.

On September 19, 2001, the Municipality of Montcerf and the Lytton Township Municipality were merged into the new Municipality of Montcerf-Lytton with Fernand Lirette (mayor of Montcerf since 1974) as first mayor.

== Demographics ==
Historical census populations – Montcerf-Lytton

Year	Pop.	±%
2006	739	—
2011	687	−7.0%

Year	Pop.	±%
2016	636	−7.4%
2021	653	+2.7%

Source: Statistics Canada

Private dwellings occupied by usual residents: 306 (out of 387 total)

== Arts and culture ==
Montcerf is mentioned in David Foster Wallace's novel Infinite Jest. The character John ("no relation") Wayne is originally from Montcerf.

== Government ==
=== Local government ===
List of former mayors:

- Fernand Lirette (2001–2009)
- Alain Fortin (2009–2021)
- Véronique Danis (2021–present)
