= Canadian Tribute to Human Rights =

Monument in Ottawa, Canada

- Canada
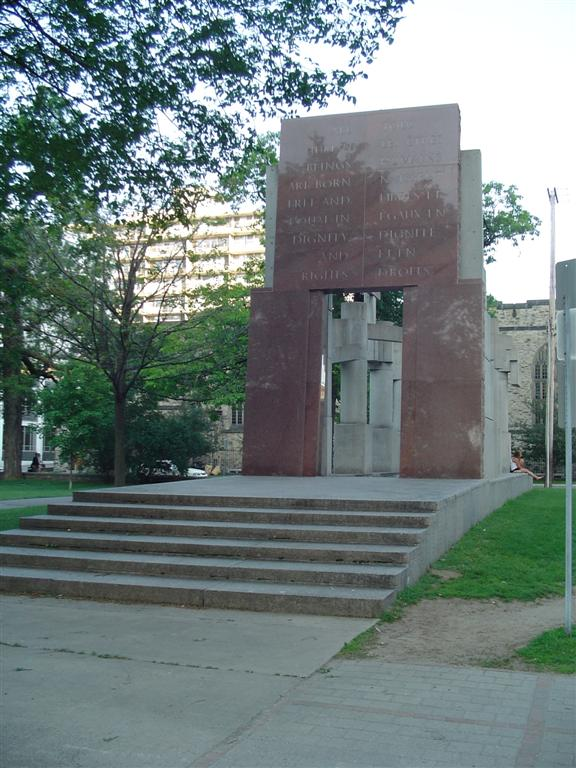
- View of Canadian Tribute to Human Rights from the north
- For Human Rights
- Unveiled: September 30, 1990
- Location: corner of Lisgar and Elgin streets near Ottawa, Ontario, Canada
- Designed by: Melvin Charney

The Canadian Tribute to Human Rights, also known as the Human Rights Monument, is a monumental sculpture located at the corner of Lisgar and Elgin streets in Ottawa, Ontario, Canada. It was designed by Montreal artist and architect Melvin Charney and unveiled by Tenzin Gyatso, the fourteenth Dalai Lama, on September 30, 1990.

== Appearance ==
Standing over thirty feet high and constructed of red granite and concrete, the Monument's red granite facade bears the text of the first sentence of Article One of the United Nations Universal Declaration of Human Rights: "All human beings are born free and equal in dignity and rights - Tous les êtres humains naissent libres et egaux en dignité et en droits." The words "Equality," "Dignity," and "Rights" - in English and French – are etched on granite plaques and carried by anthropomorphic figures behind the façade. They also appear on granite plaques within the Monument, known as the House of Canada, in 73 Indigenous languages found in Canada.

== Design and construction ==
Drawing on the inspiration of the solidarity trade union struggles in Poland in the 1980s, a group of Canadians joined together on December 10, 1983 - International Human Rights Day - to create a permanent artistic symbol of historic and ongoing struggles for fundamental human rights. Seven months later, the Canadian Tribute to Human Rights Inc., a community-based charitable organization, was formed to oversee the construction. A volunteer-based Board of Directors was soon created and assisted by a small staff. This group was supported by 36 patrons and nearly 400 local and national groups from all sectors of Canadian society, including Federal, Provincial, and Municipal governments and numerous businesses.

The Regional Municipality of Ottawa-Carleton donated the Elgin Street site in 1984, and a widely publicized, two-stage national competition was subsequently launched in 1985 to find someone to design the Monument. One hundred and twenty-nine artists and architects from across Canada entered the competition. The jury included many eminent Canadians from all regions of the country including representatives from the University of Winnipeg, the University of Ottawa, the University of Waterloo, Canadian Centre for Architecture, the Vancouver School of Art, and the Montréal Museum of Fine Arts.

In September 1986 – after having narrowed the competition down to ten finalists – the jury unanimously selected the entry of Melvin Charney. Charney was awarded the $10,000 prize for an impressive sculpture which narrates the struggle for human rights in granite and concrete. The jury noted the dignity and permanence of his design, specifically its integration with buildings adjacent to the site, and commended Charney for his rich use of symbolism. The design subsequently received the unanimous approval of the council of the Regional Municipality of Ottawa-Carleton.

The site for the Canadian Tribute to Human Rights was officially dedicated on April 17, 1985 – Equality Day – in the presence of the Honourable Walter McLean, a Progressive Conservative critic who was responsible for the Status of Women portfolio and who later served as a Member on the Standing Committee on Human Rights and the Status of Disabled Persons. In November 1988, the ground on which the Monument stands was ceremoniously broken by two young people: Cheryl Tooshkenig and Megan Balciunas. The ceremony was attended by then Ottawa Mayor Jim Durrell and then Town Cryer Daniel Richer. The Lisgar Collegiate Brass Band and the Red Road Singers added to the spirit of the celebration. The Monument's award-winning artist, Melvin Charney, was also present at the event.

== Symbolism ==
The Canadian Tribute to Human Rights was created in the belief that public art can make a social statement and play a role in mobilizing citizens to awareness and action. The Monument marks in public space the importance of human rights in our society, based on the Canadian Charter of Rights and Freedoms and the United Nations Universal Declaration of Human Rights.

Work is essential for social change, but so too are powerful symbols that can transform people's hearts. They point to the changes needed in the world around us. For example, in 1980 as one of its first actions, the newly formed Polish trade union Solidarność erected a commemorative monument in Gdansk which embodies that society's sacrifices and aspirations.

The Canadian Tribute to Human Rights symbolizes the idea that community has its social foundation firmly rooted in the enjoyment of equal rights and freedoms by each citizen.

At the time of its opening on September 30, 1990, it was the world's first such structure dedicated to the struggle for fundamental rights and freedoms. It symbolizes the commitment of Canadians to live in a society based on justice, human dignity, and universal rights. The hope is that this symbol will inspire and remind our leaders, teach our children, and sensitize our visitors to the idea that human rights are the cornerstone of human community. Until the rights of all individuals and groups are respected, none are secure.

== Events ==
The Monument has played host to many demonstrations related to human rights. On September 30, 1990, for example, the Monument was officially unveiled. This ceremony began with a ceremonial introduction by Algonquin elder William Commanda, a poignant event because the Monument is located on original land of the Algonquin people. The Canadian Tribute to Human Rights was officially unveiled by the Dalai Lama, who ceremoniously walked through the archway of the Monument.

On September 24, 1998, Nelson Mandela visited the Monument to unveil a commemorative plaque honouring John Peters Humphrey, a Canadian jurist who served for twenty years as the Director of the United Nations Division of Human Rights, drafting and championing the Universal Declaration of Human Rights. During his remarks at the unveiling, President Mandela expressed his desire that the Monument "inspire all who see it to join hands in a partnership for world peace, prosperity, and equity."

More recently, on June 21, 2010, the remaining Aboriginal Language Plaques were unveiled in a public ceremony. Speeches were delivered by The Right Honourable Michaëlle Jean and members of Aboriginal communities including Shawn Atleo, Chief of the Assembly of First Nations; Mary Simon, President of Inuit Tapiriit Kanatami; Clément Chartier, President of the Métis National Federation; and Betty Ann Lavallée, National Chief of the Congress of Aboriginal Peoples.

In addition to these official ceremonies, the Monument is and has been the site of a variety of political and social demonstrations. These range from solidarity rallies for Bahrain and Palestine to commemorative tributes for victims of Stalin-induced famines in Ukraine during the 1930s. In November 2010, "Light for Rights" was hosted at the Monument as a means of promoting HIV/AIDS awareness.

== Additions to the Monument ==
In 1998, a plaque honouring John Peters Humphrey, a Canadian who was the first director of the United Nations Human Rights Division and who wrote the preliminary draft of the United Nations Universal Declaration of Human Rights, was added to the Monument. The plaque was unveiled by Nelson Mandela on September 24, 1998, commemorating the 50th anniversary of the declaration. During his remarks at the unveiling, President Mandela expressed his desire that the monument "inspire all who see it to join hands in a partnership for world peace, prosperity and equity."

In June 2011, the Board of Directors installed a plaque to inform visitors about the House of Canada and the Aboriginal Language Plaques housed within.

== Future Projects ==
With the recent dedication of the remaining Aboriginal Language Plaques, the Monument is moving ever closer to completion. The Board is currently in the planning stages of installing lighting to complete the design of the Monument. This will highlight the design of the Monument and also allow it to be used in the evenings.

== See also ==
- Human Rights in Canada
- Canadian Human Rights Act
- Human Rights Commission
- Canadian Human Rights Tribunal
- Canadian Charter of Rights and Freedoms
