= Seven fires prophecy =

Anishinaabe prophecy regarding the people on Turtle Island

Seven fires prophecy is an Anishinaabe prophecy that marks phases, or epochs, in the life of the people on Turtle Island, the original name given by the indigenous peoples of the now North American continent. The seven fires of the prophecy represent key spiritual teachings for North America, and suggest that the different colors and traditions of the human beings can come together on a basis of respect. It contains information for the future lives of the Anishinaabe which are still in the process of being fulfilled.

In 1988, Edward Benton-Banai documented the prophecy in The Mishomis Book.

== Overview ==
Originally, the prophecy and the Ojibwa migration story were closely linked. However, the last half of the prophecy appears to apply to all peoples in contact with the Anishinaabeg. Consequently, with the growth of the Pan-Indian Movement in the 1960s and the 1970s, concepts of the Seven fires prophecy merged with other similar prophetical teaching found among Indigenous peoples of North America forming a unified environmental, political, and socio-economic voice towards Canada and the United States. The Seven fires prophecy was originally taught among the practitioners of Midewiwin.

William Commanda, an Algonquin elder and former chief of the Kitigàn-zìbì Anishinàbeg First Nation, was the wampum belt keeper for the seven fires prophecy. He died on August 3, 2011.

== Seven fires ==
Originally, the prophecies were given by eight prophets in seven different time periods. According to oral tradition, the Mi'kmaq Nation heard the first Prophet. The remaining seven prophets appeared before and were recorded by the Anishinaabeg. A prophecy of each of these seven periods were then called a "fire". The teachings of the Seven fires prophecy also state that when the world has been befouled and the waters turned bitter by disrespect, human beings will have two options to choose from, materialism or spirituality. If they choose spirituality, they will survive, but if they choose materialism, it will be the end of it.

=== First ===
In the time of the First Fire, the Anishinabe nation will rise up and follow the sacred shell of the Midewiwin Lodge. The Midewiwin Lodge will serve as a rallying point for the people and its traditional ways will be the source of much strength. The Sacred Megis will lead the way to the chosen ground of the Anishinabe. You are to look for a turtle shaped island that is linked to the purification of the earth. You will find such an island at the beginning and end of your journey. There will be seven stopping places along the way. You will know the chosen ground has been reached when you come to a land where food grows on water. If you do not move you will be destroyed.

In heeding this prophecy, the Anishinaabe peoples, after receiving guarantees of the safety of their "Fathers" (the Abenaki peoples) and their "allied brothers" (Mi'kmaq) of having the Anishinaabeg move inland, away from the Atlantic coast, mass migration of the Anishinaabeg took place, proceeding to the "First Stopping Place" known as Mooniyaang, known today as Montreal, Quebec. There, the Nation found a "turtle-shaped island" marked by miigis (cowrie) shells.

The Nation grew to a large number and spread up both Ottawa River and the St. Lawrence River. The second of the "turtle-shaped island" marked by miigis shells was at Niagara Falls.

=== Second ===
You will know the Second Fire because at this time the nation will be camped by a large body of water. In this time the direction of the Sacred Shell will be lost. The Midewiwin will diminish in strength. A girl will be born to point the way back to the traditional ways. She will show the direction to the stepping stones to the future of the Anishinabe people.

The oral traditions of the members of Council of Three Fires say that the realization of the Second fire came about the "Third Stopping Place" located somewhere near what now is Detroit, Michigan. The Anishinaabeg had divided between those who went up Ottawa River and those that went up the St. Lawrence River. After leaving the area about Niagara Falls, this group proceeded to the "Round Lake" (Lake St. Clair) and found the third "turtle-shaped island" marked by miigis shells. They continued westward until arriving along the southern shores of Lake Michigan but by this time, the evidence of the miigis shells were lost, and the southern Anishinaabeg became "lost" both physically in their journey as well as spiritually in their journey. The southern group of Anishinaabeg disintegrated into what today are the Ojibwa, Odawa and the Potawatomi. The northern group along the Ottawa River divided into Algonquin, Nipissing and the Mississaugas, but they maintained cohesion that was not maintained by the southern group.

Eventually, a Potawatomi girl had a dream and pointed the southern group back towards and past the "Round Lake". The southern group rejoined not as a single Anishinaabe peoplehood but rather as a unified alliance called Council of Three Fires. Travelling east and north, and then west, the Council crossed a series of small islands known as "the stepping stones" until they arrived onto Manitoulin island, described as the "Fourth Stopping Place" of the "turtle-shaped island" marked by miigis shell. There on the island, the Council met up with the Mississaugas, who then spiritually fully re-aligned the formerly lost southern group with the northern group who were never lost. The Odawa facilitated the "healing" and the island became synonymous as the "Odawa's Island" in the Anishinaabe language.

=== Third ===
In the Third Fire the Anishinabe will find the path to their chosen ground, a land in the west to which they must move their families. This will be the land where food grows upon the waters.

From the cultural center on Manitoulin Island, the Ojibwe moved to the area about Sault Ste. Marie, where there was the next "turtle-shaped island" marked by miigis shell. Baawating or "The Rapids" of the Saint Marys River became the "Fifth Stopping Place" of the Ojibwe. From this spot, the Ojibwe and the rapids became synonymous with each other, with the Ojibwe known by the Dakota peoples as Iyo-ḣaḣatoŋwaŋ ("cascading-waterfalls people") and later by the French as Saulteurs ("cascaders") and Saulteaux ("cascades"). From here, the Ojibwe moved west, dividing into two groups, each travelling along the shores of Lake Superior, searching for the "land where food grows upon the waters".

=== Fourth ===
The Fourth fire prophecy was delivered by two prophets who came as one. The first prophet said,

You will know the future of our people by the face the light skinned race wears. If they come wearing the face of brotherhood then there will come a time of wonderful change for generations to come. They will bring new knowledge and articles that can be joined with the knowledge of this country. In this way, two nations will join to make a mighty nation. This new nation will be joined by two more so that four will form the mightiest nation of all. You will know the face of the brotherhood if the light skinned race comes carrying no weapons, if they come bearing only their knowledge and a hand shake.

The other prophet said,

Beware if the light skinned race comes wearing the face of death. You must be careful because the face of brotherhood and the face of death look very much alike. If they come carrying a weapon ... beware. If they come in suffering ... They could fool you. Their hearts may be filled with greed for the riches of this land. If they are indeed your brothers, let them prove it. Do not accept them in total trust. You shall know that the face they wear is one of death if the rivers run with poison and fish become unfit to eat. You shall know them by these many things.

While at the "Fifth Stopping Place", the light-skinned people in big wooden boats, known as the French arrived. Consequently, the French were called Wemitigoozhii ("wooden-boat people"). Though the French Crown was interested in colonialism, as far as the Anishinaabeg were concerned, the French appeared only interested in commerce and trade through mercantilism. Together with the French, the Anishinaabeg formed trade alliances, which not only extended French colonial powers into the heart of North America, but strengthened the political and military might of the Anishinaabeg.

After the French came the Zhaaganaash ("Off-shore ones") of Great Britain. But out of the Zhaaganaash came the Gichi-mookomaan ("Big-knives")—the Virginians (i.e. Americans).

=== Fifth ===
In the time of the Fifth Fire there will come a time of great struggle that will grip the lives of all native people. At the waning of this Fire there will come among the people one who holds a promise of great joy and salvation. If the people accept this promise of a new way and abandon the old teachings, then the struggle of the Fifth Fire will be with the people for many generations. The promise that comes will prove to be a false promise. All those who accept this promise will cause the near destruction of the people.

=== Sixth ===
In the time of the Sixth Fire it will be evident that the promise of the Fifth Fire came in a false way. Those deceived by this promise will take their children aways from the teachings of the Elders. Grandsons and granddaughters will turn against the Elders. In this way the Elders will lose their reason for living ... they will lose their purpose in life. At this time a new sickness will come among the people. The balance of many people will be disturbed. The cup of life will almost become the cup of grief.

=== Seventh ===
The Seventh Prophet that came to the people long ago was said to be different from the other prophets. This prophet was described as "young and had a strange light in his eyes" and said:

In the time of the Seventh Fire New People will emerge. They will retrace their steps to find what was left by the trail. Their steps will take them to the Elders who they will ask to guide them on their journey. But many of the Elders will have fallen asleep. They will awaken to this new time with nothing to offer. Some of the Elders will be silent because no one will ask anything of them. The New People will have to be careful in how they approach the Elders. The task of the New People will not be easy.

If the New People will remain strong in their quest the Water Drum of the Midewiwin Lodge will again sound its voice. There will be a rebirth of the Anishinabe Nation and a rekindling of old flames. The Sacred Fire will again be lit.

It is this time that the light skinned race will be given a choice between two roads. One road will be green and lush, and very inviting. The other road will be black and charred, and walking it will cut their feet. In the prophecy, the people decide to take neither road, but instead to turn back, to remember and reclaim the wisdom of those who came before them. If they choose the right road, then the Seventh Fire will light the Eighth and final Fire, an eternal fire of peace, love, brotherhood and sisterhood. If the light skinned race makes the wrong choice of the roads, then the destruction which they brought with them in coming to this country will come back at them and cause much suffering and death to all the Earth's people.
