= Désert River =

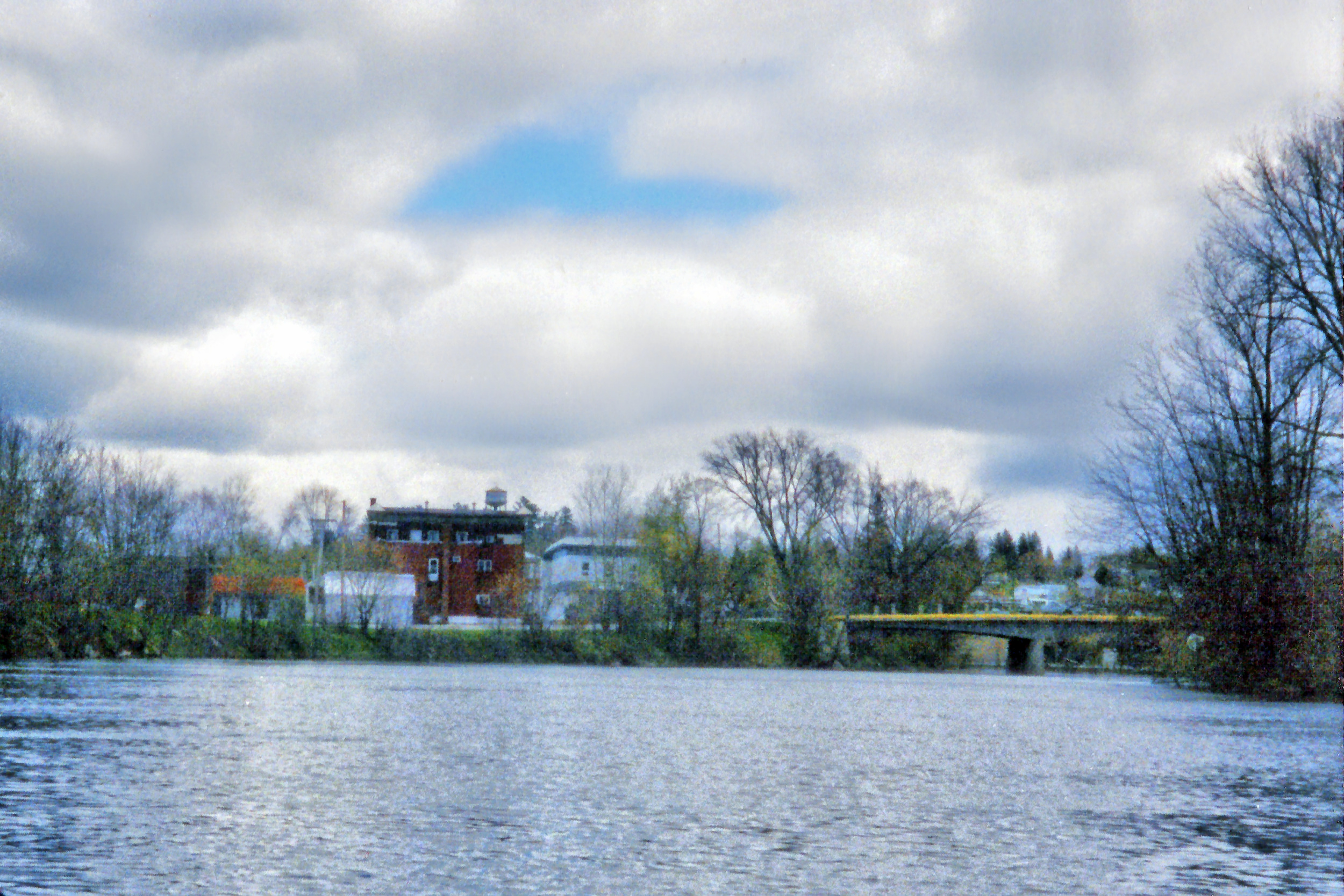
- Désert River at Maniwaki

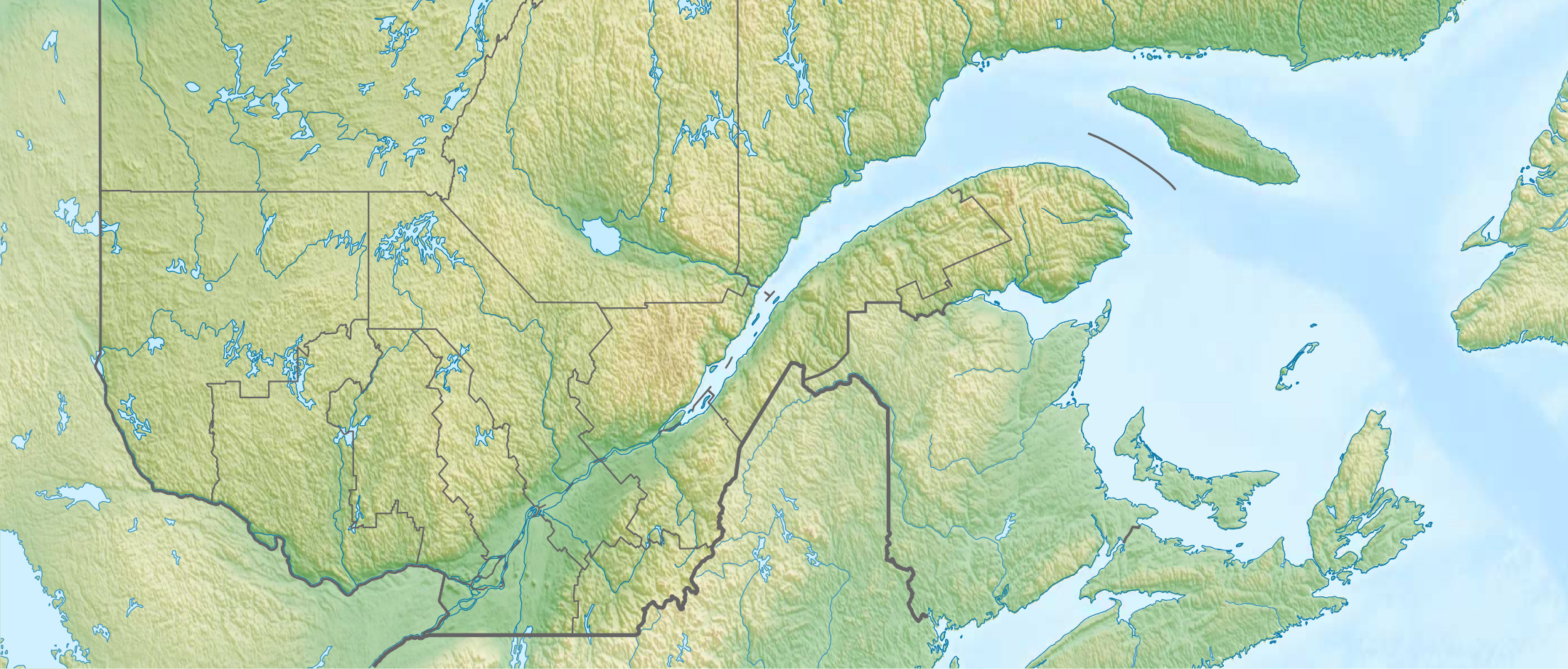
- Location within Quebec South
- Native name: Rivière Désert (French)

Location
- Country: Canada
- Province: Quebec
- Region: Outaouais
- Regional county: La Vallée-de-la-Gatineau

Physical characteristics
- Source: Lake Désert
  - location: Lac-Pythonga
  - coordinates: 46°36′35″N 76°17′20″W
- Mouth: Gatineau River
  - location: Maniwaki
  - coordinates: 46°23′08″N 75°58′27″W

Basin features
- Progression: Désert→ Gatineau→ Ottawa→ St. Lawrence
- Tributaries
  - right: Aigle River

The Désert River (French: Rivière Désert) is a river in the Outaouais region of Quebec, Canada.

The river starts at Lake Désert and flows in a northeasterly direction. It turns south near the northern boundary of the municipality of Montcerf-Lytton, meandering for more than 40 kilometres (25 mi). It then straightens and from the confluence with the Aigle River, the river forms the boundary between Egan-Sud and Kitigan Zibi Reserve. Finally it turns east before draining into the Gatineau River at Maniwaki.

It was named "Désert" (French for "desert") due to a natural clearing or man-made vacant land along its banks near its mouth at the Gatineau River. "Desert" in the sense of cleared terrain comes from the dialects of northwestern France. The Hudson's Bay Company built a trading post on this spot in 1838, followed by an Oblate mission in the 1840s, which formed into a settlement called Notre-Dame-du-Désert in 1849 (now known as Maniwaki).

The Désert River overflowed its banks and caused flooding in 1974, mid 1990's, and 2017, requiring evacuations in Maniwaki.
