= Cayamant =

- Municipality
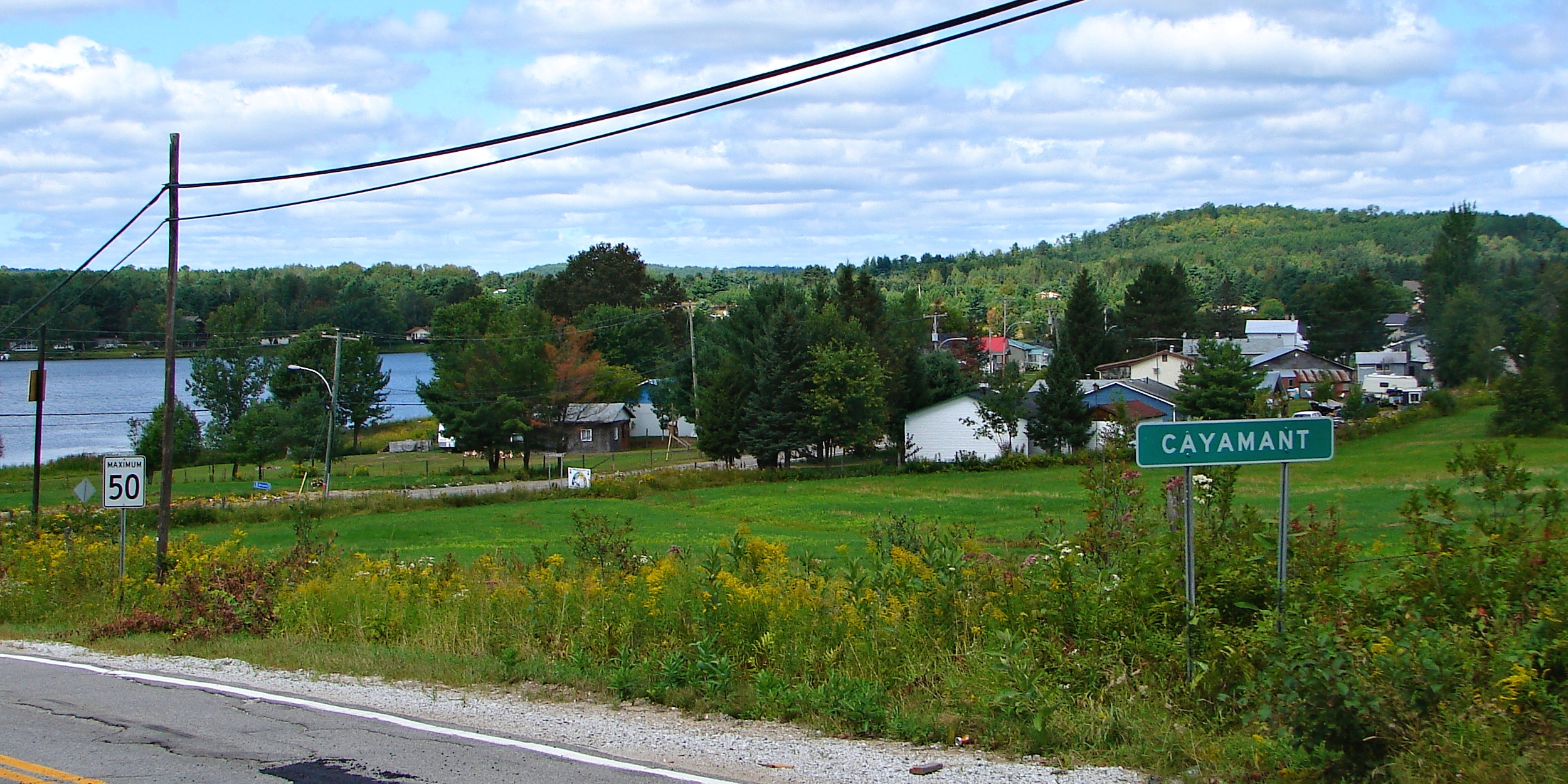

- Location in western Quebec
- Coordinates: 46°08′N 76°15′W
- Country: Canada
- Province: Quebec
- Region: Outaouais
- RCM: La Vallée-de-la-Gatineau
- Constituted: October 10, 1906

Government
  - Mayor: Robert Berniquez
  - Federal riding: Pontiac—Kitigan Zibi
  - Prov. riding: Gatineau

Area
  - Total: 414.75 km^{2} (160.14 sq mi)
  - Land: 382.49 km^{2} (147.68 sq mi)

Population (2021)
  - Total: 895
  - Density: 2.3/km^{2} (6.0/sq mi)
  - Pop (2016–21): ▲9.0%
  - Dwellings: 1,036
- Time zone: UTC−5 (EST)
  - Summer (DST): UTC−4 (EDT)
- Postal code(s): J0X 1Y0
- Area code: 819
- Website: www.cayamant.ca

Cayamant is a municipality in La Vallée-de-la-Gatineau Regional County Municipality, Quebec, Canada. The village of Lac-Cayamant is located at the north end of Lake Cayamant, west of Gracefield.

It was formerly known as the Township Municipality of Dorion, named after Antoine-Aimé Dorion (1818-1891). It was renamed to the Municipality of Cayamant at the end of 1988, due to many problems created by having the identical name to that of the city of Dorion (which merged with neighbouring Vaudreuil in 1994). The new name refers to the largest lake in its territory, Lake Cayamant. The Algonquin term Kakgama, Kandikagamaw, or Kandikagama means "porcupine". Alternatively, it may come from Kantuagama, which means lake with a large bay.

The village has a primary school, a church, and some convenience stores, restaurants and some basic commerce. Most of the population lives near the lake. The most populated street is "Rue Principale" (Main Street).

== History ==
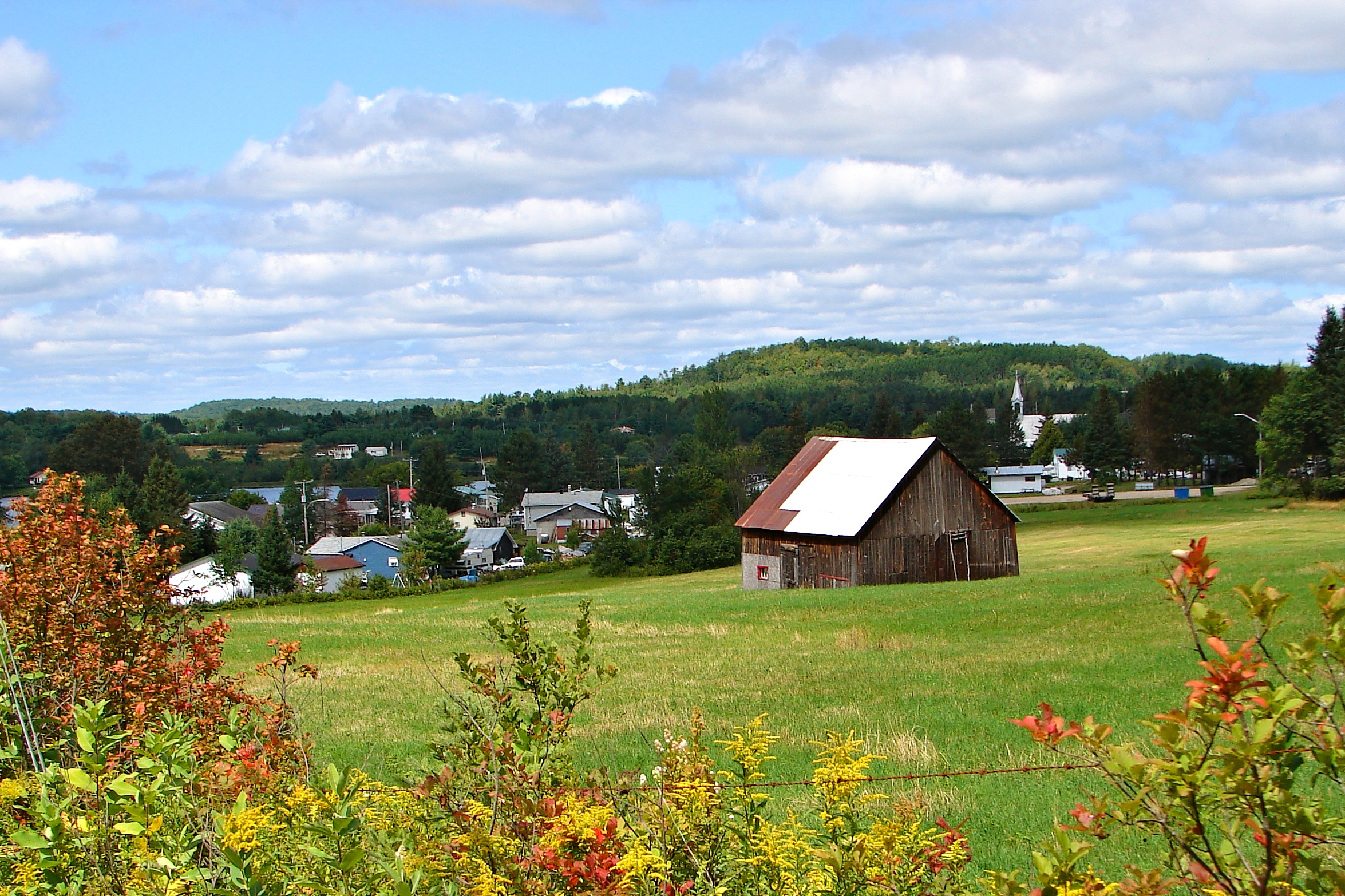
View of Cayamant

Between 1890 and 1900, a few settlers moved to the shores of Cayamant Lake, becoming home to a flood of French Canadians who were heading to the west of the province in search of farmland.

In 1902, the "Lake Cayamont" post office opened (renamed in 1943 to Lake Cayamant). The Township Municipality of Dorion was formed on October 10, 1906. The first municipal council was elected on October 17, 1906, with Victor Mercier as first mayor, who served until 1923.

In 1918, the parish of Saint-Roch-du-Lac Cayamant was established. In 1988, Dorion was renamed to Cayamant.

== Demographics ==
Historical census populations – Cayamant

Year	Pop.	±%
1976	377	—
1981	455	+20.7%
1986	545	+19.8%
1991	548	+0.6%
1996	706	+28.8%

Year	Pop.	±%
2001	691	−2.1%
2006	811	+17.4%
2011	875	+7.9%
2016	821	−6.2%
2021	895	+9.0%

Source: Statistics Canada

Private dwellings occupied by usual residents (2021): 460 (out of 1,036 total)

Languages:

- English as first language: 3.7%
- French as first language: 95.1%
- English and French as first language: 1.2%

== Local government ==
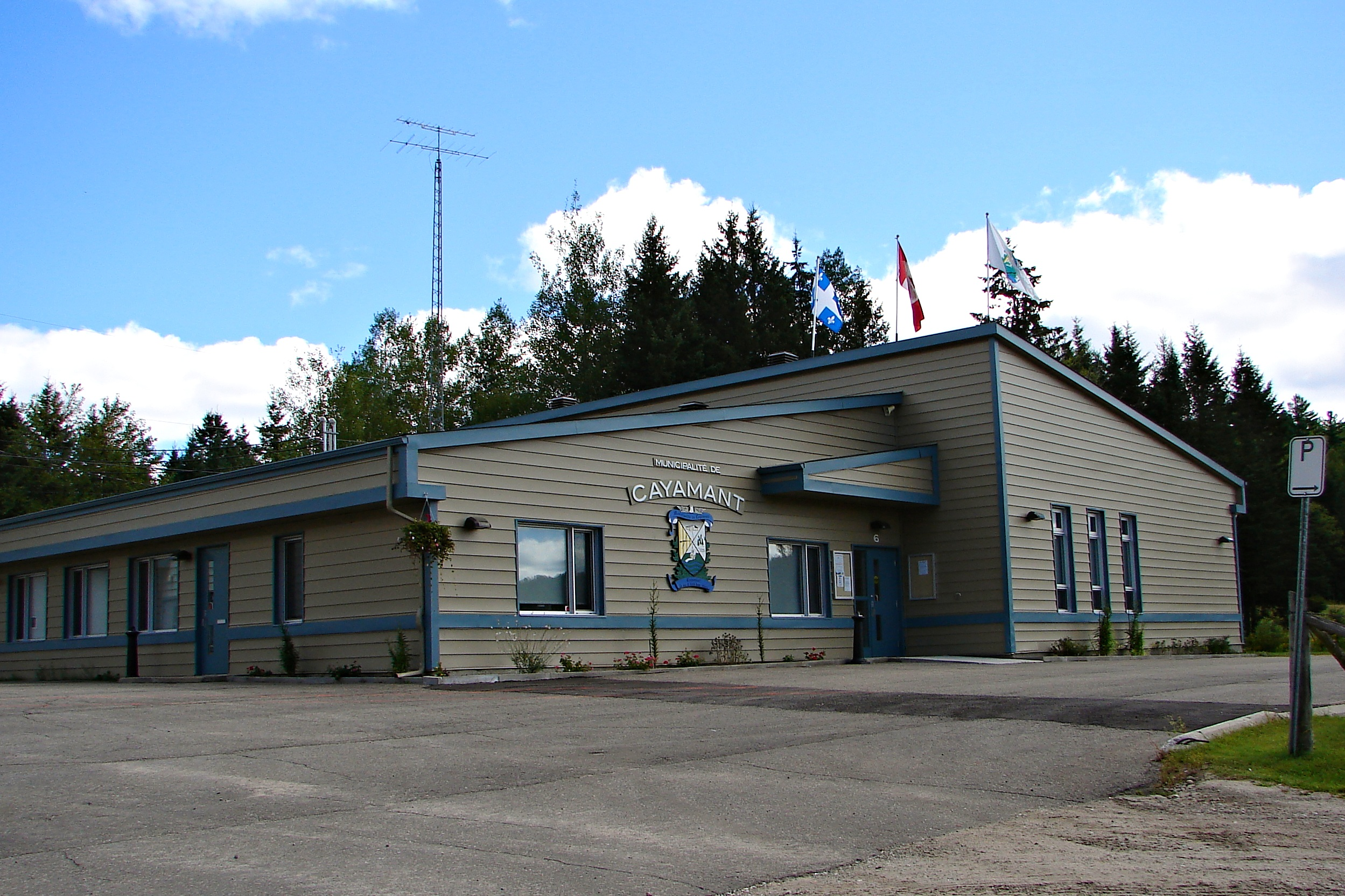
Cayamant Town Hall

List of former mayors:

- Paul Dontigny (1947–1961, 1965–1970)
- Aurèle Rochon (...–2005)
- Suzanne Labelle Lamarche (2005–2009)
- Pierre Pedro Chartrand (2009–2013)
- Chantal Lamarche (2013–2017)
- Nicolas Malette (2017–present)
