= Kitigan Zibi =

First Nations reserve in Quebec, Canada

- First Nations Reserve
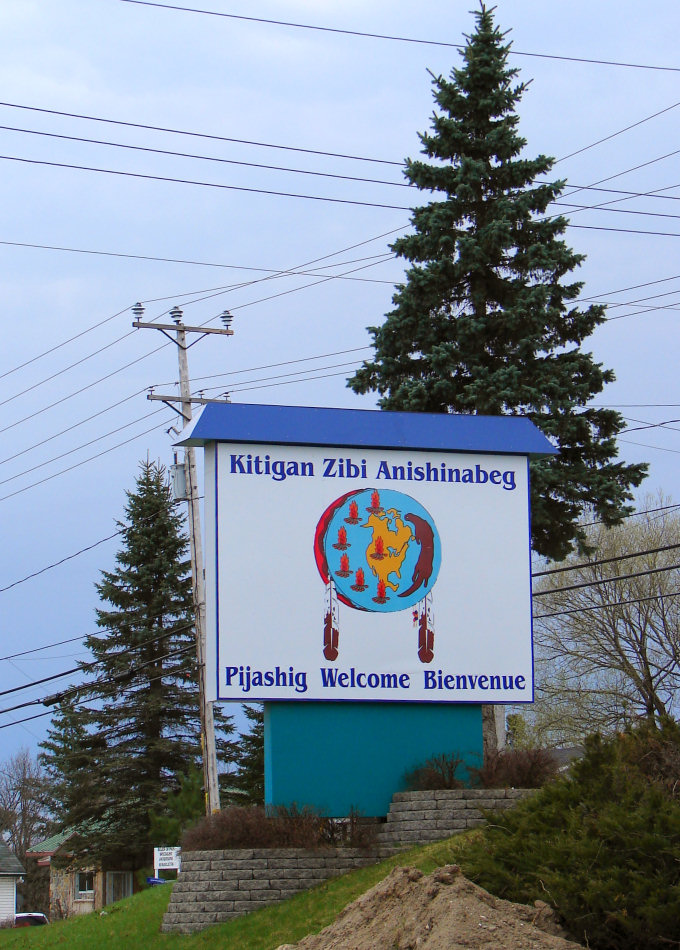
- Welcome sign

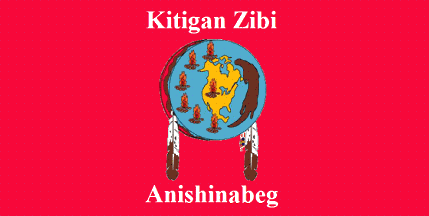
- Flag

- Location in western Quebec.
- Coordinates: 46°20′N 75°58′W
- Country: Canada
- Province: Quebec
- Region: Outaouais
- Established: 1851

Government
  - Type: Band council
  - Chief: Dylan Whiteduck
  - Federal riding: Pontiac—Kitigan Zibi
  - Prov. riding: Gatineau

Area
  - Total: 210.09 km^{2} (81.12 sq mi)
  - Land: 195.06 km^{2} (75.31 sq mi)

Population (2021)
  - Total: 1,204
  - Density: 6.2/km^{2} (16/sq mi)
- Time zone: UTC−05:00 (EST)
  - Summer (DST): UTC−04:00 (EDT)
- Postal Code: J9E
- Area code: 819
- Website: kitiganzibi.ca

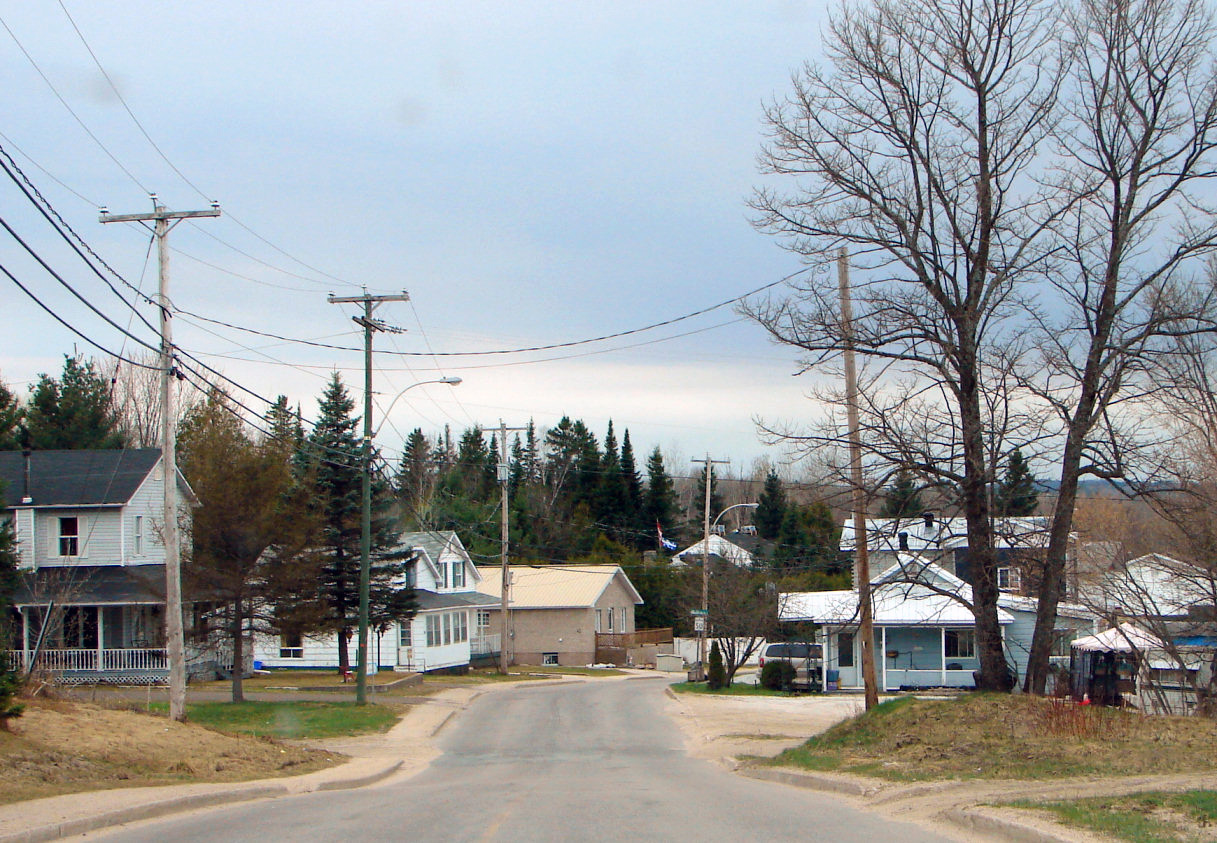
Kitigan Zibi

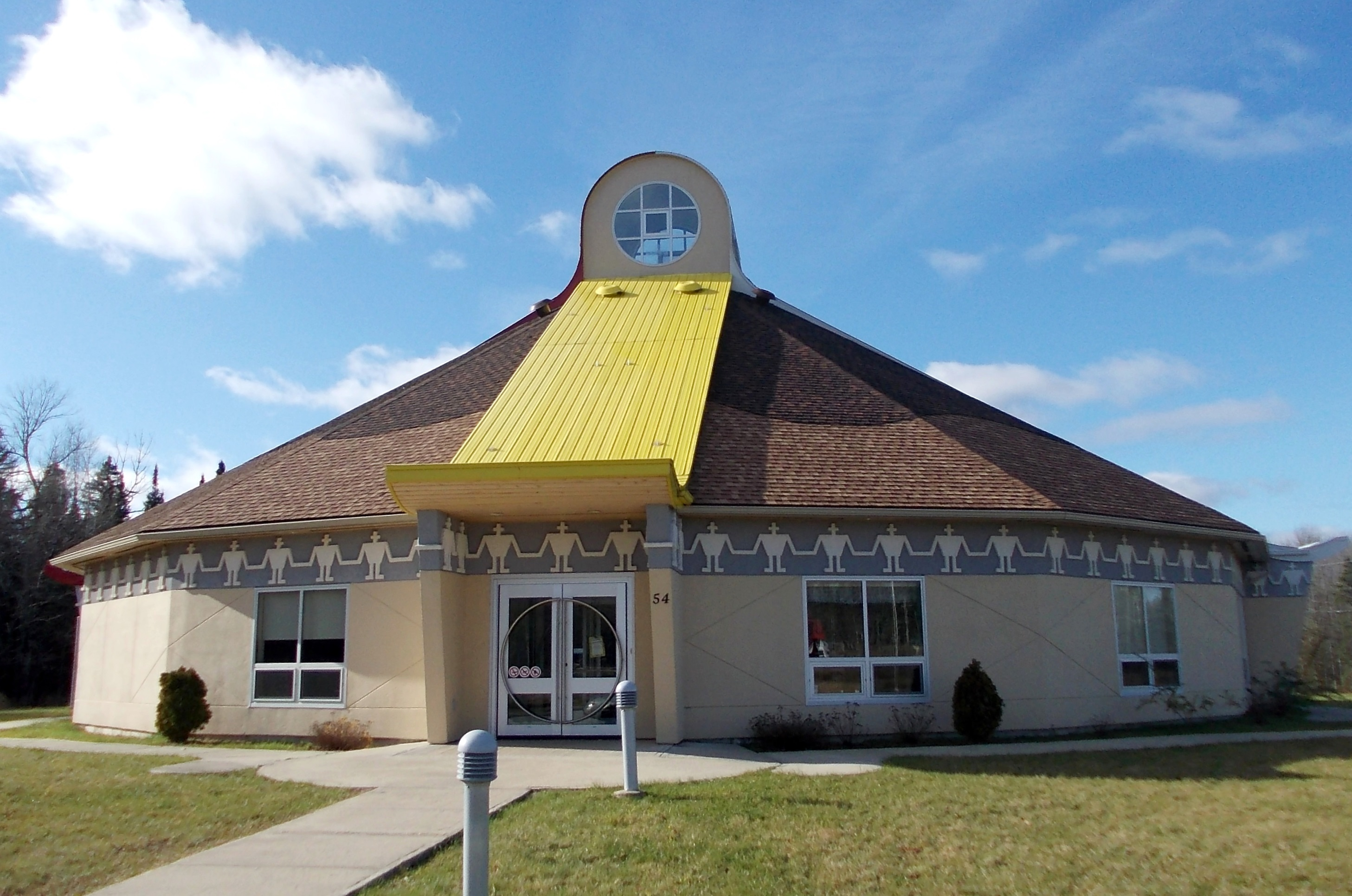
Museum in Kitigan Zibi, Quebec, Canada

Kitigan Zibi (also known as River Desert, and designated as Maniwaki 18 until 1994) is a First Nations reserve of the Kitigan Zibi Anishinabeg First Nation, an Algonquin band. It is situated near the confluence of the Désert and Gatineau Rivers, and borders south-west on the Town of Maniwaki in the Outaouais region of Quebec, Canada. Having a total area of 210.09 km^{2} (81.12 sq mi), it is the largest Algonquin Nation in Canada in both area and population.

Present on the reserve are shops, an elementary and secondary school, a community hall, a health centre, police services, a youth centre, a retirement home, a cultural centre, and the CKWE 103.9 radio station.

== Etymology ==
Kitigàn Zìbì – "garden river" (Algonquin language).

== Economy ==
The creation of a forestry company, Migot, which holds a forest management agreement allows them to cut trees on their ancestral territories. They also work in collaboration with other forest operators. They are also important partners in the management of the Eagle Forest, a territory located west of Maniwaki, where logging, outdoor activities and wildlife protection go hand in hand. The community also has a 12,000-tap maple grove whose potential has not yet been fully exploited and it is in Kitigan Zibi that Awazibi pure maple syrup is produced.

== Toponymy ==
Kitigàn can be translated from Algonquin as "garden", "cultivated land" or "cleared land". This name may have originated as a reference to a clearing made by the Hudson's Bay Company for the establishment of its post, dependencies, and the adjoining garden.

== Geography ==
The reserve is bounded by the Eagle River along its west side, by the Désert River on the north side, and the Gatineau River on the east side. Most of its development is along or near Highway 105, while forest still covers much of the reserve. It is also home to 13 fresh water lakes with areas in excess of 250,000 square metres (2,700,000 sq ft; 25 ha; 62 acres) and approximately 29 smaller lakes and streams located throughout the territory.

Fish species found within these waters include walleye, pike, bass, trout, carp, catfish, and fresh water sturgeon. Mammals found within the reserve include beaver, muskrat, fisher, marten, mink, otter, bobcat, lynx, cougar, deer, black bear, wolf, and moose.

== History ==
The history of the reserve is closely linked to that of the Town of Maniwaki, which developed concurrently.

In the first half of the 19th century, Algonquins of the mission at Lake of Two Mountains, under the leadership of Chief Pakinawatik, came to the area of the Désert River. Shortly after, in 1832, the Hudson's Bay Company followed them and installed a trading post at the mouth of this river (now within the municipal boundaries of Maniwaki). A decade later, Missionary Oblates of Mary Immaculate established the mission of Notre-Dame-du-Desert and, from 1849, they demanded of the authorities the demarcation of a township in order to establish a reserve for the Algonquins. Chief Pakinawatik, along with other leaders, journeyed by canoe on three occasions to Upper Canada (Toronto) and negotiated the terms for the setting aside of the reserve land. The township limits were drawn in 1850 and given the name of Maniwaki by the Oblates at this time. In Algonquin language, the place was identified as Kitigànsìpì or Kitigàn Zìbì, meaning "Garden River."

Legally established in 1851, the reserve was demarcated in 1853. In the decree implementing it, the reserve was called "Manawaki" (after mani aki meaning "Mary's Land") and also "River Desert". The name "Kitigan Zibi" came to replace the other two on September 24, 1994, when the band council gave this title to the reserve.

Because of land claim settlements in the late 1990s, small portions of land of the Town of Maniwaki were added to Kitigan Zibi. The federal government concluded, on 18 March 2019, an agreement to pay the Kitigan Zibi community $116 million, settling 29 claims for Indian reserve land appropriated between 1873 and 1917 for the town site of Maniwaki. The same community filed in December 2016 a claim in Ontario Superior Court, claiming it never surrendered and still owns the land in Ottawa on which Parliament of Canada stands.

== Demographics ==
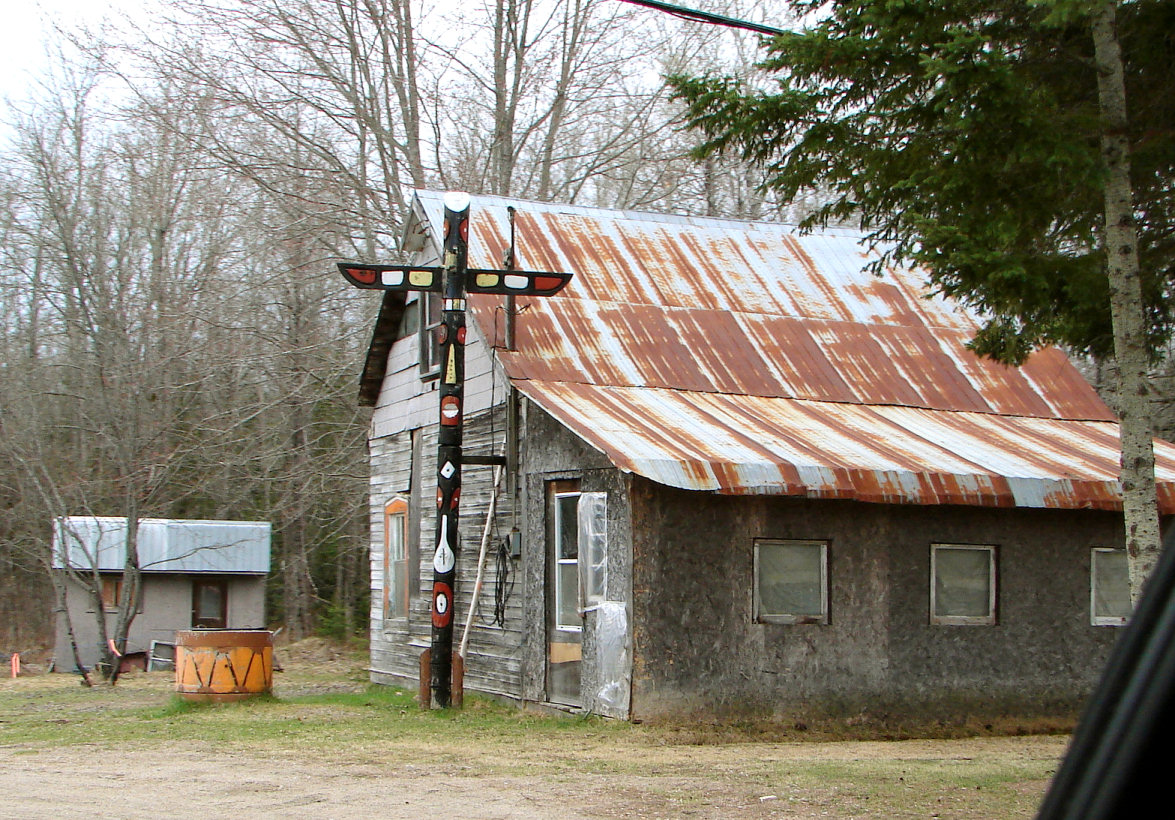
Kitigan Zibi

As of May 2022, the registered population of the Kitigan Zibi Anishinabeg First Nation is 3,685 members, of whom 1,624 live on the Kitigan Zibi reserve and 2,061 live off reserve.

Canada census – Kitigan Zibi community profile

| | 2016 |
| Population | 1221 (4.3% from 2011) |
| Land area | 172.93 km^{2} (66.77 sq mi) |
| Population density | 7.1/km^{2} (18/sq mi) |
| Median age | 35.9 (M: 30.8, F: 40) |
| Private dwellings | 505 (total) |
| Median household income | $46,241 |

References: 2016

Historic populations:

- Population in 2021: 1,204
- Population in 2016: 1,221
- Population in 2011: 1,401
- Population in 2006: 1,165
- Population in 2001: 1,081
- Population in 1996: 969
- Population in 1991: 563

Diversity, 2021 Canadian Census: Indigenous ancestry only – 77.24%, Indigenous and non-Indigenous ancestries – 14.95%, Non-Indigenous ancestry only – 7.81%.

Religion, 2021 Census: No religion and secular perspectives – 47.34%, Christianity – 34.47%, Indigenous Spirituality – 15.78%, Other – 2.41%.

=== Language ===
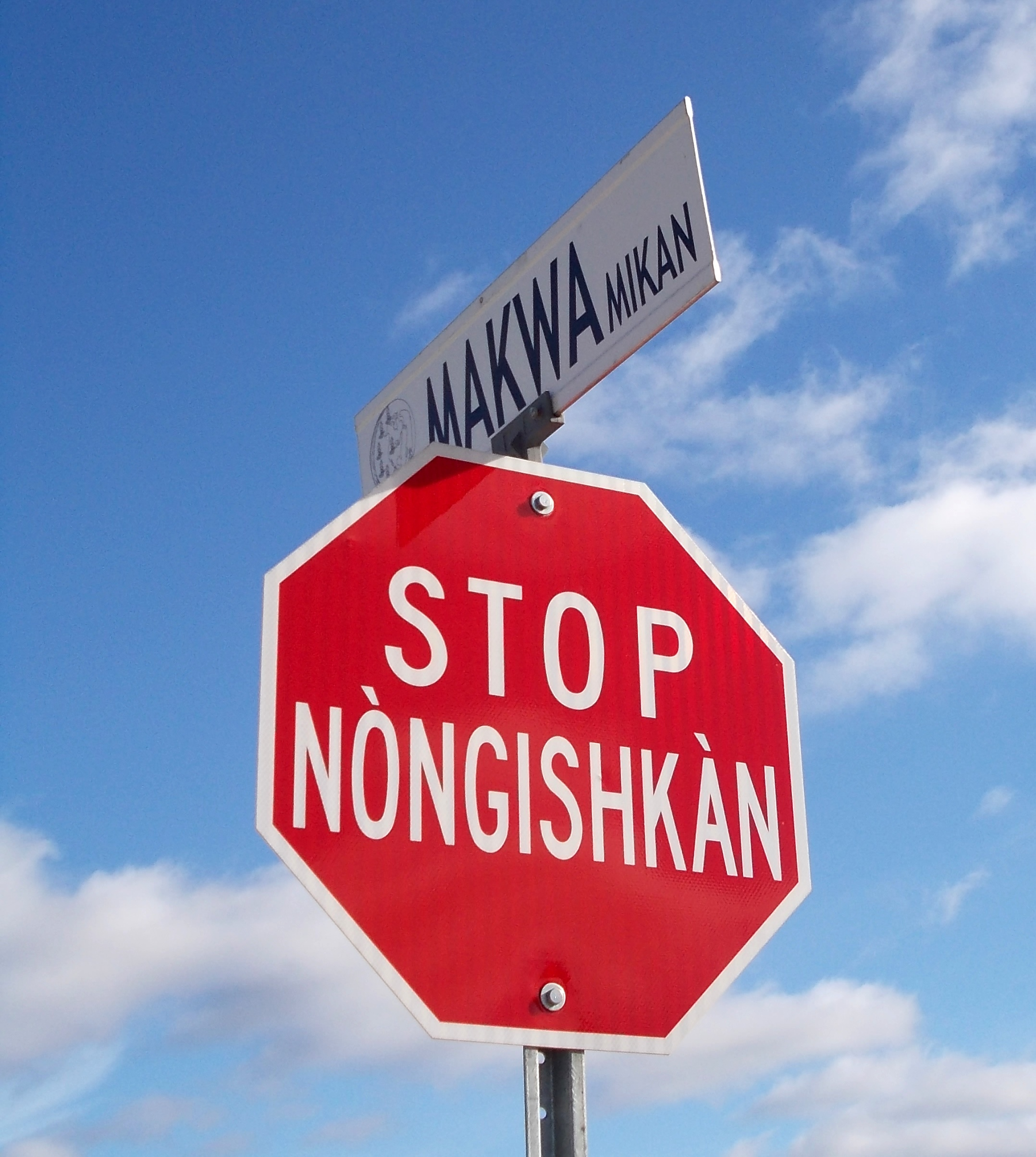
Stop sign (English-Algonquin) in Kitigan Zibi, Quebec, Canada

As of the 2021 census, the mother tongue of those living on the Kitigan Zibi reserve are:

- English – 64.7%
- French – 14.1%
- Anicinabemowin (Algonquin) – 10.0%
- French and English: – 5.8%

== Education ==
There are two schools on the reserve:

- Pakinawatik Kikinamadinan (pre-school)
- Kitigan Zibi Kikinamadinan (elementary and high school)

== Notable people ==
- Gino Odjick - ice hockey player
- Joshua Odjick – actor

== See also ==
- List of anglophone communities in Quebec
