= Maniwaki =

- City
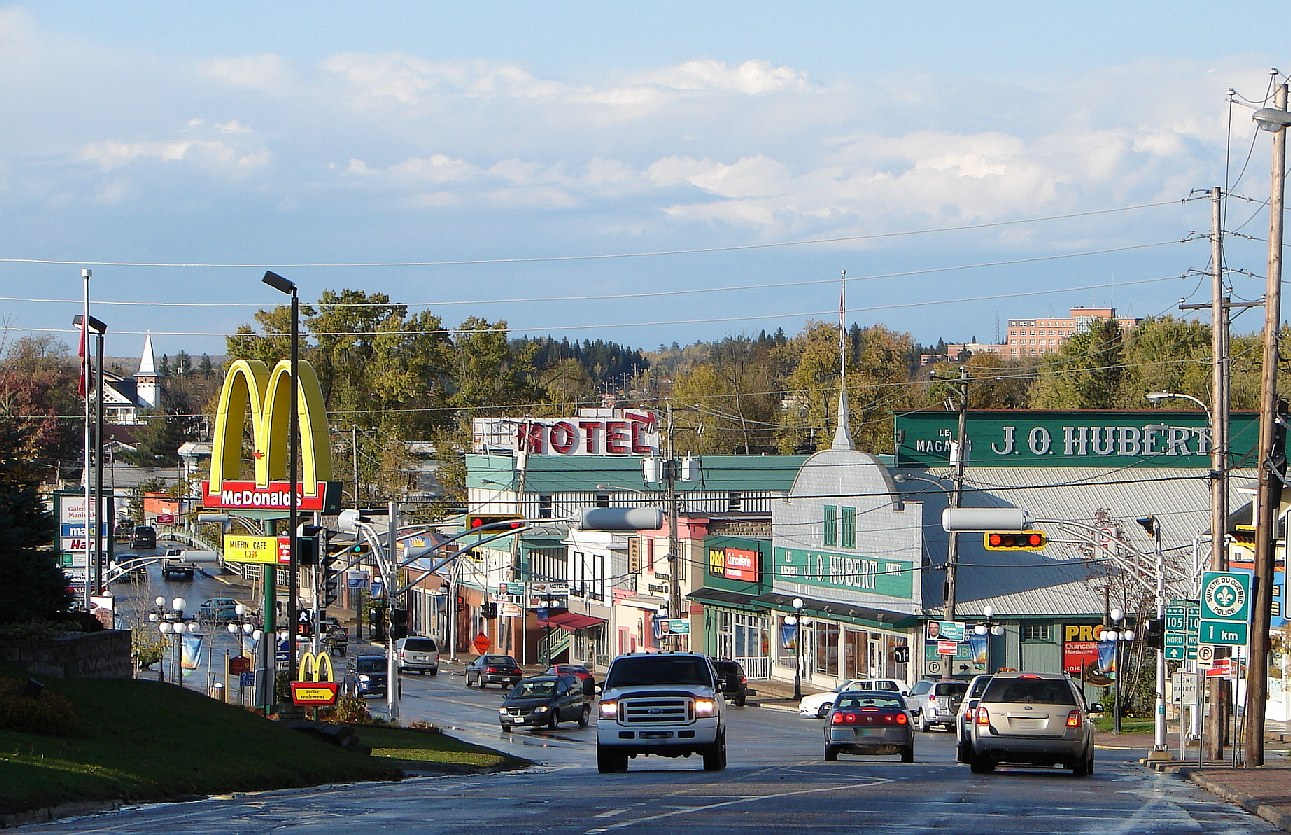
- Main street (Hwy. 105)

- Coat of arms

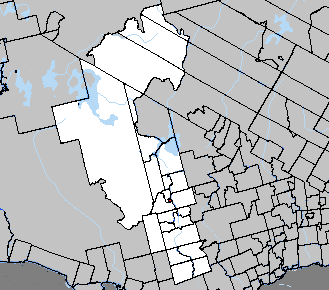
- Location within La Vallée-de-la-Gatineau RCM

- Location in western Quebec
- Coordinates: 46°22′30″N 75°58′0″W
- Country: Canada
- Province: Quebec
- Region: Outaouais
- RCM: La Vallée-de-la-Gatineau
- Constituted: March 15, 1904

Government
  - Mayor: Francine Fortin
  - Federal riding: Pontiac—Kitigan Zibi
  - Prov. riding: Gatineau

Area
  - Total: 8.82 km^{2} (3.41 sq mi)
  - Land: 5.67 km^{2} (2.19 sq mi)

Population (2021)
  - Total: 3,757
  - Density: 662.8/km^{2} (1,717/sq mi)
  - Pop (2016–21): ▼2.2%
  - Dwellings: 2,110
- Time zone: UTC−5 (EST)
  - Summer (DST): UTC−4 (EDT)
- Postal code(s): J9E 1Z9
- Area code: 819
- Website: www.ville.maniwaki.qc.ca

Maniwaki is a town in the province of Quebec, Canada. It is situated 130 kilometres (81 mi) north of Ottawa, Ontario, on the Gatineau River, at the crossroads of Route 105 and Route 107, near Route 117 (Trans-Canada Highway). The town is the administrative centre for La Vallée-de-la-Gatineau Regional County Municipality.

== History ==
The history of Maniwaki is closely linked to that of the adjacent Kitigan Zibi Reserve, because the Town of Maniwaki was developed on land that was originally part of this reserve. Its municipal lands were included in historical land claims by Kitigan Zibi; some of which were settled as recently as 2007.

In the first half of the nineteenth century, Algonquins of the mission at Lake of Two Mountains, under the leadership of Chief Pakinawatik, came to the area of the Désert River. Shortly after, in 1832, the Hudson's Bay Company followed them and installed a trading post at the confluence of the Désert and Gatineau rivers. A decade later, Missionary Oblates of Mary Immaculate established the mission of Notre-Dame-du-Desert and, from 1849, they demanded of the authorities the demarcation of a township in order to establish a reserve for the Algonquins. The township limits were drawn in 1850 and the settlement was given the name of Maniwaki by the Oblates at this time (Algonquin for "Mary's Land"). Soon after, wood merchants, farmers, trade workers, businessmen and professionals, drawn by the forest's wealth, came to live in Maniwaki.

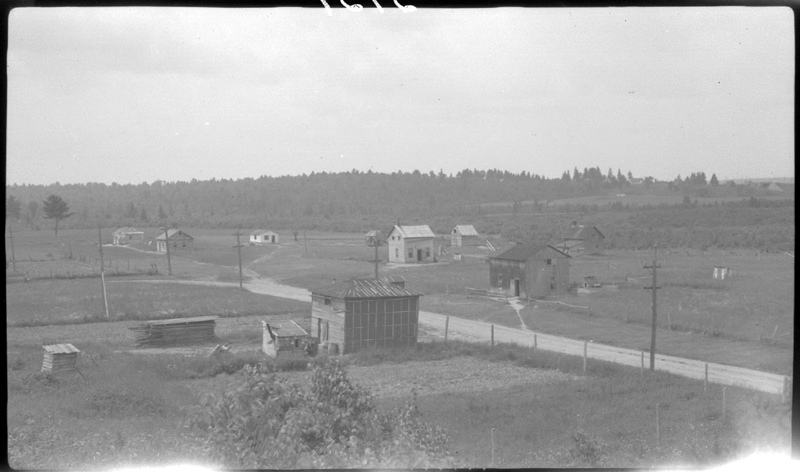
Village of Maniwaki, 1942

Ottawa was linked to Maniwaki by a branch line of the Canadian Pacific Railroad, a distance of 82.3 miles. After crossing the Ottawa River, there were stations were at Hull, Wakefield, Low, Kazabazua and Gracefield before reaching Maniwaki. It was opened in stages between 1893 and 1902. Passenger services were discontinued in 1964. The line was totally abandoned in 1986.

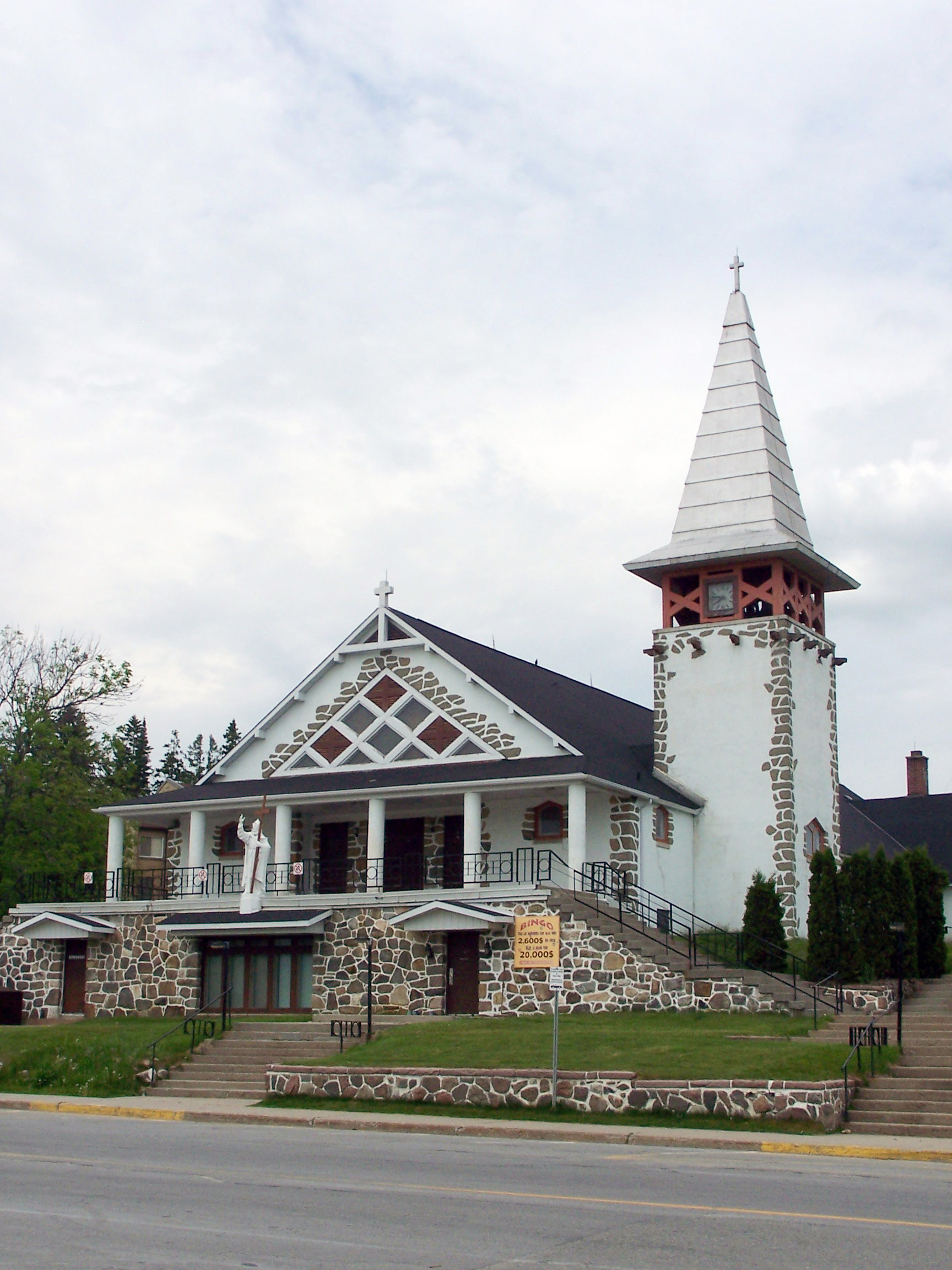
Christ-Roi church

In 1851, the Oblats founded the L'Assomption-de-Maniwaki parish. Forestry took root and became the livelihood of many settlers in the region. Irish, French and Algonquins, the three traditional cultures of the Gatineau Valley, contributed to the development of the town and lived side by side in harmony. Maniwaki was officially founded in 1851 and became a township municipality in 1904. It obtained the status of "village" in 1930, and status of "Ville" in 1957.

At the end of World War I, the region, like everywhere in Quebec, indeed like in most of the world, was hit by an epidemic of the Spanish influenza. In less than two weeks, some twenty deaths were related to this sickness. Scared, people refused to go outdoors, and for the first time in its history, a Sunday passed without any mass being celebrated at the Assumption church.

The flood of 1974 is an event remembered by the local population. On May 14 of that year, the waters of the Gatineau river and those of the Désert river overflowed. The water rose at the alarming rate of 3 to 6 inches an hour. Over 1,000 residences in the Maniwaki area were flooded and approximately 3,000 people had to be evacuated. Although no one was injured, damages reached many millions of dollars.

Since 1974, no other major calamity has occurred. The area continues prospering every year in two predominant fields, namely forestry and tourism.

== Geography and climate ==
Maniwaki has a humid continental climate (Köppen Dfb). The average annual temperature in Maniwaki is 4.6 °C (40.3 °F). The average annual rainfall is 939.2 mm (36.98 in) with October as the wettest month. The temperatures are highest on average in July, at around 19.1 °C (66.4 °F), and lowest in January, at around −12.0 °C (10.4 °F). The highest temperature ever recorded in Maniwaki was 37.8 °C (100.0 °F) on 1 August 1975; the coldest temperature ever recorded was −46.7 °C (−52.1 °F) on 11 January 1954.

Climate data for Maniwaki, 1991–2020 normals, extremes 1953−present
Month	Jan	Feb	Mar	Apr	May	Jun	Jul	Aug	Sep	Oct	Nov	Dec	Year
Record high humidex	11.0	11.2	28.3	32.9	38.9	43.3	45.6	47.8	40.8	35.9	24.1	16.7	47.8
Record high °C (°F)	10.9 (51.6)	11.1 (52.0)	27.2 (81.0)	30.7 (87.3)	35.0 (95.0)	34.8 (94.6)	36.8 (98.2)	37.8 (100.0)	35.3 (95.5)	28.0 (82.4)	23.1 (73.6)	15.0 (59.0)	37.8 (100.0)
Mean daily maximum °C (°F)	−6.4 (20.5)	−4.3 (24.3)	2.0 (35.6)	10.0 (50.0)	18.6 (65.5)	23.4 (74.1)	25.6 (78.1)	24.3 (75.7)	19.6 (67.3)	11.8 (53.2)	4.1 (39.4)	−3.1 (26.4)	10.5 (50.9)
Daily mean °C (°F)	−12.0 (10.4)	−10.4 (13.3)	−4.0 (24.8)	4.0 (39.2)	11.7 (53.1)	16.7 (62.1)	19.1 (66.4)	17.9 (64.2)	13.3 (55.9)	6.7 (44.1)	−0.2 (31.6)	−7.7 (18.1)	4.6 (40.3)
Mean daily minimum °C (°F)	−17.4 (0.7)	−16.5 (2.3)	−10.0 (14.0)	−2.1 (28.2)	4.8 (40.6)	10.0 (50.0)	12.6 (54.7)	11.5 (52.7)	7.1 (44.8)	1.5 (34.7)	−4.5 (23.9)	−12.2 (10.0)	−1.3 (29.7)
Record low °C (°F)	−46.7 (−52.1)	−43.9 (−47.0)	−38.9 (−38.0)	−23.3 (−9.9)	−8.3 (17.1)	−2.2 (28.0)	1.6 (34.9)	−0.3 (31.5)	−4.7 (23.5)	−11.7 (10.9)	−25.5 (−13.9)	−38.3 (−36.9)	−46.7 (−52.1)
Record low wind chill	−45.7	−46.8	−38.7	−26.8	−9.7	−4.1	0.0	0.0	−6.0	−12.7	−29.5	−42.5	−46.8
Average precipitation mm (inches)	75.8 (2.98)	55.8 (2.20)	70.7 (2.78)	72.3 (2.85)	72.7 (2.86)	79.6 (3.13)	87.0 (3.43)	94.6 (3.72)	86.6 (3.41)	96.2 (3.79)	72.1 (2.84)	75.9 (2.99)	939.2 (36.98)
Average precipitation days (≥ 0.2 mm)	14.8	12.0	11.6	11.9	11.6	11.1	12.5	12.3	11.9	12.9	13.8	14.6	150.9
Average relative humidity (%) (at 3pm)	68.7	59.3	51.2	46.6	46.4	51.4	53.9	55.9	59.8	61.6	69.6	74.7	58.3
Average dew point °C (°F)	−13.8 (7.2)	−12.3 (9.9)	−6.9 (19.6)	−1.6 (29.1)	4.2 (39.6)	11.2 (52.2)	13.7 (56.7)	13.2 (55.8)	9.2 (48.6)	3.5 (38.3)	−1.9 (28.6)	−10.5 (13.1)	0.7 (33.2)
Source: Environment and Climate Change Canada (dew point 1pm, 1951–1980)

== Demographics ==
In the 2021 Census of Population conducted by Statistics Canada, Maniwaki had a population of 3,757 living in 1,881 of its 2,110 total private dwellings, a change of −2.2% from its 2016 population of 3,843. With a land area of 5.67 km^{2} (2.19 sq mi), it had a population density of 662.6/km^{2} (1,716.2/sq mi) in 2021.

Canada census – Maniwaki community profile

	2021	2016
Population	3,757 (-2.2% from 2016)	3,853 (-2.0% from 2011)
Land area	5.67 km^{2} (2.19 sq mi)	5.98 km^{2} (2.31 sq mi)
Population density	662.8/km^{2} (1,717/sq mi)	644.3/km^{2} (1,669/sq mi)
Median age	54.4 (M: 52.0, F: 56.4)	52.4 (M: 50.8, F: 53.7)
Private dwellings	2,110 (total) 1,881 (occupied)	2,061 (total)
Median household income	$50,000	$37,419

Notes: 2021 population change based on revised count.
References: 2021 2016

Historical census populations – Maniwaki

Year	Pop.	±%
1976	5,969	—
1981	5,424	−9.1%
1986	5,168	−4.7%
1991	4,605	−10.9%
1996	4,527	−1.7%

Year	Pop.	±%
2001	4,020	−11.2%
2006	4,102	+2.0%
2011	3,930	−4.2%
2016	3,843	−2.2%
2021	3,757	−2.2%

2016 figure is revised count from 2021. 2001 figure is based on revised count.
Source: Statistics Canada

Languages (2006):

- English as first language: 5.5%
- French as first language: 90.7%
- English and French as first language: 0.7%
- Other as first language: 3.1%

== Notable people ==
- Gilles Carle - film director, screenwriter and painter
- Annie Galipeau - actress who starred in the 1999 movie about Grey Owl, alongside Pierce Brosnan
- Matt Lang - country music artist
- Gino Odjick - NHL player for Vancouver Canucks, New York Islanders, Philadelphia Flyers and Montreal Canadiens
- Bridget Tolley - activist for Missing and Murdered Indigenous Women (MMIW), founder Families of Sisters in Spirit

== Disappearance of Maisy Odjick and Shannon Alexander ==
On September 6, 2008, the town of Maniwaki was brought into the international spotlight with the disappearance of Maisy Odjick and Shannon Alexander from the Kitigan Zibi Nation. Search and Rescue Global One was invited to the community by the chief and council. Two separate searches were conducted, both unsuccessful. Since their disappearance, the Quebec police, RCMP and the Kitigan Zibi Anishinabeg police have carried out several investigations, but it was not possible to move the case forward.
