= List of air show accidents and incidents in the 21st century =

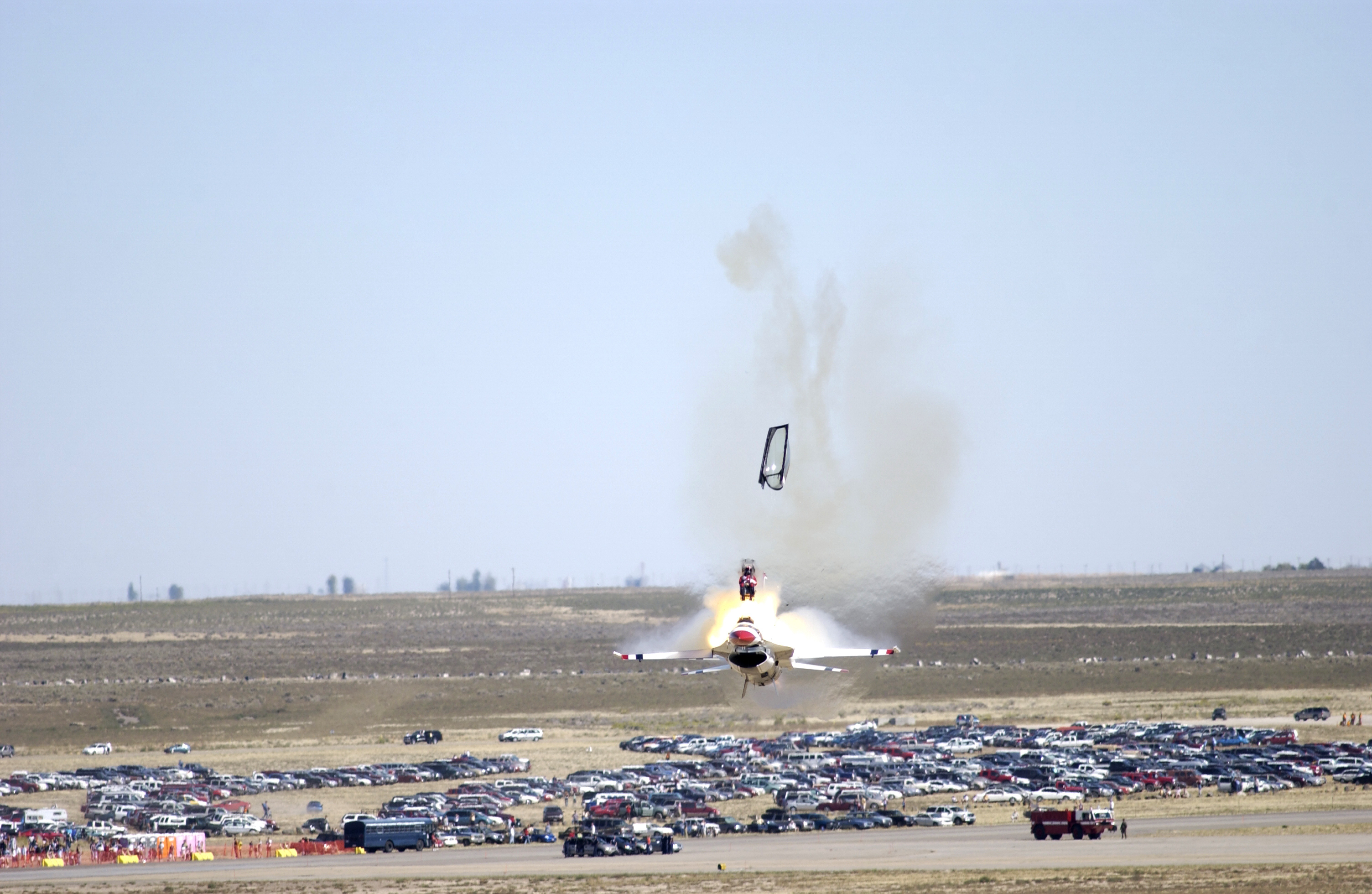
F-16 Ejection at Mountain Home, Idaho September 15, 2003

This is a year-by-year list of aviation accidents that have occurred at airshows worldwide in the 21st century.

== 2026 ==
- Sep 5 – Tanagra Air Base, Greece – A McDonnell Douglas F-4 Phantom 2 of the 338th Fighter-Bomber Squadron crashed into a cliff during the annual Athens Flying Week airshow while attempting a high speed low flyby over the southernmost runway. Both pilots were found deceased at the crash site.
- May 17 – Mountain Home Air Force Base, Idaho – Two United States Navy EA-18G jets collided in midair during an air show. All four air crew safely ejected.

== 2025 ==
- November 21 – Dubai Air Show (Dubai, UAE) – An Indian Air Force pilot was killed when his Tejas fighter aircraft crashed during a flight demonstration.
- August 28 – Radom Airport, Warsaw, Poland – A Polish Air Force pilot, Maciej "Slab" Krakowian, was killed when his F-16 crashed during a rehearsal for the Radom Air Show. The show was subsequently canceled.
- April 24 – Langley Air Force Base, Virginia – Pilot Rob Holland was killed when his MXS-RH crashed while landing. Holland was scheduled to perform that weekend. The National Transportation Safety Board (NTSB) found that the accident was caused by a loose counterweight plug, which jammed the elevator and caused a loss of flight control.
- March 28 – Australian International Airshow (Avalon, Victoria, Australia) – A member of the Paul Bennet Sky Aces formation aerobatic team crashed while flying a Wolf Pitts S-1-11X. The pilot was injured and the plane was written off. The Australian Transport Safety Bureau (ATSB) found that the pilot had started a series of snap rolls too low, and had insufficient height to recover.
- March 22 – West Coast Air Show (Saldanha, South Africa) – Pilot James O'Connell died after his Aermacchi MB-326 crashed during a performance.

== 2024 ==
- October 20 – Air and Space Expo (Las Cruces, New Mexico) – Charles Thomas “Chuck” Coleman, a test pilot who was a flight instructor for the cast of the 2022 movie Top Gun: Maverick died after his Extra 300L crashed during a performance.
- October 5 – Old Rhinebeck Airport, Rhinebeck, New York – At about 14:56 EDT, an experimental amateur-built Coughlin Fokker D.VIII replica, N94100, was destroyed when it was involved in an accident. The commercial pilot was fatally injured.
- August 16 – Le Lavandou, France – A pilot was killed when his Fouga Magister crashed into the Mediterranean Sea during an airshow. The Bureau of Enquiry and Analysis for Civil Aviation Safety (BEA) concluded that the pilot suffered either a G-induced almost loss-of-consciousness (A-LOC) or full G-induced loss-of-consciousness (G-LOC) and lost control of the plane.
- July 12 – Gdynia Naval Aviation Brigade's 30th Anniversary event (Gdynia, Poland) – A military pilot, Robert “Killer” Jeł, was killed when his M-346 Bielik crashed into the ground during rehearsal. The pilot was taking part in exercises as part of the M-346 aerobatic team.
- June 2 – Beja Airshow (Beja, Portugal) – One Spanish pilot was killed and one Portuguese pilot was injured when two Yakovlev Yak-52 aircraft, part of the YAKSTARS aerobatic display team, crashed midair during an aerial demonstration. The airshow was suspended after the accident. The Portuguese Office for the Prevention and Investigation of Accidents in Civil Aviation and Rail (GPIAAF) attributed the collision to a loss of situational awareness and a lack of training.
- May 25 – L'Aquila Airshow (Parchi di Preturo Airport, L'Aquila, Italy) – A helicopter pilot was killed when he was run over by a fuel tanker maneuvering for routine aircraft refueling operations on the airport runway. The airshow was suspended after the accident.
- May 25 – Battle of Britain event (RAF Coningsby, Lincolnshire, England) – A Spitfire crashed in a field just before 1.20pm, killing the pilot.
- May 12 – Fort Lauderdale Executive Airport, Fort Lauderdale, Florida – Two jets touched wings during a formation flight at an air show. An emergency was declared, but the planes landed without incident.
- May 5 – San Xavier Airshow (Murcia, Spain) – An aerobatic pilot was killed when a vulture flew into his cockpit, causing his Extra 300 to crash.
- April 23 – Lumut, Malaysia – Two Malaysian Navy helicopters, an Airbus Helicopters H125 Fennec and a Leonardo AW139 collided while flying in formation prior to an airshow. Ten crew members were killed.
- January 13 – Ban Na, Banglamung, Chonburi, Thailand – A Raj Hamsa X-Air Hanuman piloted by an Austrian pilot and German co-pilot crashed into a rice paddy while en route to take part in a children's day airshow. The plane's pilot was killed on impact and the co-pilot seriously injured.

== 2023 ==
- November 12 – Aeroclub Villa Cañas Airshow (Santa Fe Province, Argentina) – An Aero Vodochody L-29 Delfin jet was destroyed when it impacted the ground during an aerobatic maneuver. Both occupants onboard sustained fatal injuries in the crash.
- September 17 – Reno Air Races (Reno, Nevada) – Two North American T-6 Texan aircraft collided mid-air on the last day of the final Reno Air Races, killing both pilots. The accident occurred after the conclusion of the race, as the planes were coming in to land after placing first and second in their race. The other races were halted, making this the last race ever to be held at Reno. Nobody on the ground was injured. The NTSB concluded that the pilots failed to see and avoid each other while landing, as they did not follow the standard flight legs.
- September 16 – Turin Caselle Airport, Caselle Torinese, Italy – A MB-339A/PAN MLU from the Italian Air Force Display Team's Frecce Tricolori crashed on takeoff after striking a bird while preparing for their attendance at the Vercelli Airshow the following day. The pilot ejected safely, but the plane struck a vehicle carrying a family, killing a five-year-old girl and seriously injuring the remaining occupants.
- September 10 – Börgönd Aviation Day Airshow (Fejér County, Budapest, Hungary) – A North American T-28 Trojan crashed, killing both pilots and injuring 4 on the ground.
- August 13 – Thunder Over Michigan (Ypsilanti, Michigan) – A MiG-23UB jet aircraft crashed due to an unexplained loss of engine power. Both pilots ejected safely.
- July 23 – Stow Maries Great War Aerodrome, Essex, England – The propeller engine of a Fournier RF4D, G-AWGN, failed during an aerobatic display routine. The pilot made a glide approach and landed safely. Upon landing, the left wingtip smoke generator caught alight and was extinguished by the fire service.
- July 16 – Selänpään Aerodrome, Kouvola, Finland – An Extra EA-300 aerobatic aircraft crashed at an airshow, killing the pilot. The Safety Investigation Authority (OTKES) stated that this was due to the pilot attempting an unplanned maneuver that he "did not have the ability and skill" to perform.
- May 20 – Zaragoza Air Base Families Day (Zaragoza Air Base, Zaragoza, Spain) – A EF-18A Hornet of the 15th Wing of the Spanish Air Force crashed during a solo display after experiencing technical problems. The pilot safely ejected from the plane and suffered a pelvic fracture.

== 2022 ==
- November 12 – Wings Over Dallas Airshow (Dallas, Texas) – A mid-air collision between a Boeing B-17G Flying Fortress, Texas Raiders, and a Bell P-63 Kingcobra resulted in six fatalities. The NTSB determined that the proximate cause of the collision was a failure of the pilots to see and avoid each other, but found underlying issues with the event organization, including the lack of a pre-briefed separation plan and reliance on real-time instructions from the air boss to maintain aircraft separation.
- September 18 – Reno Air Races (Reno, Nevada) – An Aero L-29 Delfín crashed during lap 3 of 6 during the Jet Gold race. The pilot, Aaron Hogue, experienced a G-LOC during an aggressive roll and died in the crash.
- August 26 – Air Ambulance Display (Shobdon Airfield, Herefordshire, England) – A Pitts S-1S crashed during an aerobatic practice flight in preparation the display. The plane entered a dive at the top of a climbing vertical rolling maneuver and did not have enough height to effect a safe recovery. The pilot was fatally injured.
- August 14 – Cheb, Czech Republic – A Hawker Hurricane crashed during an airshow performance, killing the pilot, Petr Pačes. The Air Accidents Investigation Institute (UZPLN) determined that the pilot lost control as he attempted to recover from a stall when performing a maneuver in an unexpected manner.
- July 4 – Field of Flight Air Show and Balloon Festival (Battle Creek, Michigan) – Chris Darnell, a driver performing in the Shockwave Jet Truck display, died during his routine. The act involved a truck racing a jet down the runway. As the driver headed toward a wall of fire, a tire failed, causing the truck to spin out of control, flip and burst into flames.
- June 19 – Duxford Airshow (Duxford, Cambridgeshire, England) – A 1943 De Havilland Dragon Rapide flipped and crashed on the taxiway, as its right main landing gear tyre had deflated. The plane was carrying eight passengers and a pilot, who were uninjured. The plane suffered serious damage.
- April 24 – Eloy, Arizona – A Red Bull Cessna 182 crash landed after a plane swap stunt went wrong during a livestreamed demonstration. The stunt involved bringing two Cessnas into a nosedive, when each pilot would then jump out, skydive across and enter the other plane to land. Both pilots were uninjured in the accident, but later had their pilot's licences revoked by the FAA for failing to adhere to flight regulations.

== 2021 ==
- September 4 – Bournemouth Air Festival (Bournemouth, England) – A Boeing Stearman crashed into Poole Harbour. The aircraft was part of the Aerosuperbatics formation wingwalking team. The pilot and his wingwalker suffered only minor injuries. The Air Accidents Investigation Branch (AAIB) determined that the plane suffered an engine failure due to a failure of the oil inlet pipe.
- August 20 – Wilkes-Barre Scranton Airport, Avoca, Pennsylvania – A North American T-6 Texan GEICO Skytypers plane crashed during preparations for the Great Pocono Raceway Airshow. Pilot Andy Travnicek died in the crash. The accident caused the entire team to lose their sponsorship with GEICO, leading to them withdrawing from the airshow industry in 2022. The plane suffered a partial loss of power and stalled while the pilot attempted an emergency landing.
- April 17 – Cocoa Beach Air Show (Cocoa Beach, Florida) – A Grumman TBF Avenger made an emergency landing in the ocean near Patrick Space Force Base. No one was injured.

== 2020 ==
- May 17 – Kamloops, British Columbia, Canada – Before a public flyby of the Snowbirds, one CT-114 Tutor crashed after takeoff due to a birdstrike. Capt. Jenn Casey was killed and Capt. Richard MacDougal was seriously injured.
- January 24 – Iztapa Airshow (Iztapa, Guatemala) – A Zivko Aeronautics Edge 540, painted in Red Bull livery, slammed into a ramp during a private airshow, killing the plane's pilot and two people on the ground. The investigation found that the pilot began to perform solo aerobatic maneuver without prior coordination, and flew in an unsafe manner due to compromised depth perception combined with excessive confidence.

== 2019 ==
- November 1 – Witham Field, Stuart, Florida – A pilot was killed while preparing for the Stuart Air Show when his Grumman OV-1 Mohawk crashed and caught fire when he failed to recover from an "overbank" roll.
- October 2 – Wings of Freedom Tour (Bradley International Airport, Hartford, Connecticut) – A Boeing B-17 Flying Fortress, owned by the Collings Foundation, crashed due to pilot error and engine/maintenance issues. Seven occupants of the 13 on board were killed and six were injured, along with one ground injury. The aircraft was destroyed by fire.
- June 21 – Troy, Ohio – Skip Stewart was forced to make an emergency landing on a county road in Troy in his Pitts S-2S after suffering an engine loss, just 6–7 miles (9.7–11.3 km) from the Dayton International Airport in Vandalia, Ohio, where he was set to take part in the Vectren Dayton Air Show.
- June 16 – Minnesota Air Spectacular (Mankato, Minnesota) – Kent Pietsch's Jelly Belly 1942 Interstate Cadet suffered damage from prop-wash that was caused by a nearby taxiing Lockheed C-130 Hercules. The Interstate Cadet was in need of repairs; the C-130 Hercules was undamaged. No one involved in this accident suffered any sort of injury.
- June 15 – Płocki Piknik Lotniczy (Płock, Poland) – A pilot flying a Yakovlev Yak-52 was killed during an aerobatic display. The aircraft appeared to enter a flat spin. Late in the spin, the aircraft appeared to enter a more nose-down flight attitude, a common procedure used by pilots to exit a flat spin. Unfortunately, the aircraft was too low to recover and impacted the Wisła river, killing the single crewmember on board.
- February 19 – Isro Layout, Nagenahalli, India – Two BAE Systems Hawk Mk. 132 aircraft of the Surya Kiran Aerobatic Team collided midair during a rehearsal for Aero India 2019. They were about 17 km (11 mi) from the Yelahanka Air Force Station. Three people were involved in this accident: two pilots ejected safely while the third, Cdr. Sahil Gandhi, succumbed to his injuries.
- March 3 – Australian International Airshow (Avalon, Victoria, Australia) – A USAF C-17 had to abort its take-off run. Early in the take-off run, the number 4 engine ingested one of a flock of wedgetail eagles which had been milling around the airport. The plane suffered a major compressor stall, but safely aborted the take-off using emergency braking and thrust reversers on the undamaged engines.

== 2018 ==
- October 12 – Culpeper Airfest (Culpeper Regional Airport, Culpeper, Virginia) – Jon Thocker, a member of the Redline Airshows Aerobatic Team, was killed when his Van's RV-8 crashed while performing a nighttime aerobatic routine. The NTSB concluded that his sense of attitude orientation was lost due to the lack of visual cues.
- August 11 – Abbotsford International Airshow (Abbotsford, Canada) – Four people were hospitalized, one critically, after a 1930s-era De Havilland Dragon Rapide biplane experienced a sudden loss of airspeed and crashed just after takeoff. The pilot's foot was amputated as a result of the accident. The Transportation Safety Board (TSB) concluded that the pilot encountered difficulties due to the complexity of a crosswind takeoff in a plane that already required a high workload during taxi and takeoff.
- July 7 – Borcea Air Base, Borcea, Romania – A MiG-21 Lancer crashed during an airshow. Rather than ejecting, witnesses said the pilot "stayed on board to fly the plane away from the crowd" of 3,000 attendees. The pilot, Florin Rotaru, was killed in the crash.
- June 2 – Gunfighter Skies Air and Space Celebration (Mountain Home Air Force Base, Idaho) – Dan Buchanan, a hang glider pilot, was killed when a developing vortex or dust devil caused him to lose control of his hang glider. Buchanan was a wheelchair-using aviator with more than 3,000 logged hours, who combined pilotage, music, and fire for his airshow performances.
- May 30 – Melville, Long Island, New York – Ken Johansen, a member of the GEICO Skytypers team, was killed when his SNJ-2 aircraft crashed due to aerodynamic stall. The pilot had flown at the Bethpage Air Show the week before and was en route to NAS Patuxent River for an upcoming airshow.
- April 25 – Shangjie Airport, Zhengzhou, China – Eglin Wells, an aerobatic pilot from Atlanta, Georgia, was killed when his custom-designed and -built Starjammer aircraft crashed while practicing for the Zhengzhou Air Show.
- April 4 – Nevada Test and Training Range, Nevada – Maj Stephen Del Bagno was killed when his F-16, Thunderbird No. 4, crashed during a routine aerial demonstration training flight. Del Bagno temporarily lost consciousness during a high G-force maneuver and became incapacitated prior to his fatal crash.
- March 31 – Warbirds Over Wanaka (Wanaka, New Zealand) – Warbird pilot Arthur Dovey was uninjured when his Yak-3 fighter collided with ground equipment that had been left on the grass runway, while landing after a display. The Civil Aviation Authority (CAA) found that miscommunications meant that multiple pilots believed that the grass runway was available for landing while organizers believed that they would not be using it and so did not ensure that the ground equipment had been removed.
- February 6 – Singapore Airshow (Changi, Singapore) – A KAI T-50 Golden Eagle trainer from the Republic of Korea Air Force suffered a runway excursion and overturned during a formation takeoff. The pilot extricated himself from the plane and was uninjured in the accident.

== 2017 ==
- September 24 –Terracina, Italy – Capt. Gabriele Orlandi of the Italian Air Force died while performing at an air show. The pilot did not have sufficient height to recover from a loop and his Eurofighter Typhoon crashed into the sea.
- September 2 – Chernyoe Airport, Balashikha, Russia – An Antonov An-2 crashed at an air show after losing control while performing aerobatics, killing both pilots. The Interstate Aviation Committee (MAK) investigation found out that the Certificate of Airworthiness of the aircraft had expired in 2012. Additionally, both crew members did not have an An-2 type rating, and the aerobatics maneuvers performed by the aircraft were not allowed on the An-2.
- July 16 – Cummings, Kansas – Pilot, Vlado Lenoch, and passenger, Bethany Root, were killed when Lenoch's P-51D Mustang, "Baby Duck", crashed in a field. The plane had performed at the Amelia Earhart Festival the day before, was seen performing aerobatics before the accident and was flying at a low altitude for reasons that cannot be determined.
- June 23 – Dayton International Airport, Vandalia, Ohio – A F-16D used by the Air Force Thunderbirds aerobatic team ran off the runway and overturned, injuring the plane's pilot while preparing for the Vectren Dayton Air Show. Pilot, Capt. Erik Gonsalves, and passenger, Technical Sgt. Kenneth Cordova, were trapped in the aircraft for over an hour. Cordova was uninjured. The investigation revealed that excessive airspeed, coupled with landing too far down a wet runway, caused the jet to leave the airstrip and flip over. Rain on the canopy windscreen and failure to follow proper braking procedures during the landing contributed to the accident.
- June 11 – Aérodrome de Longuyon – Villette, Longuyon, France – A Spitfire XIX PS890 crashed on takeoff at an air show. The plane's pilot was injured in the accident, as was a spectator who was hit by shrapnel. The pilot stated that he may have unintentionally braked, due to inexperience with the aircraft.
- May 28 – Fleet Week New York City – U.S. Navy SEAL Remington Peters (Special Warfare Operator 1st Class), a member of the United States Navy Parachute Team "Leap Frogs", died when his parachute malfunctioned and failed to open.
- May 14 – Abingdon Air & Country Show (Abingdon, Oxfordshire, United Kingdom) – Chris Burkett, a member of the Twister Aerobatics Team, suffered minor injuries after making an emergency landing following engine failure in a Silence SA1100 Twister. The investigation found that the engine had seized due to a loss of lubrication and cooling.
- January 28 – Hunter Valley Airshow (Rutherford, New South Wales, Australia) – A pilot was forced to make a wheels up landing in the Chance-Vought F4U-5N Corsair he was flying due to a failure of its hydraulic system.
- January 26 – Australia Day celebrations (Perth, Australia) – A Grumman G-73 Mallard flying boat (VH-CQA), crashed into the Swan River. The pilot Peter Lynch and passenger Endah Cakrawati died on impact. The ATSB determined that the plane crashed due to aerodynamic stall.
- January 14 – Hat Yai Airshow (Hat Yai, Thailand) – Pilot Dilokrit Pattavee died when his Saab JAS 39 Gripen number 70108 crashed. The Air Force later concluded that spatial disorientation was the cause of the crash.

== 2016 ==
- August 27 – Airshow of the Cascades (Madras, Oregon) – Alaska-native pilot Marcus Paine was killed when his 450 Stearman biplane crashed. He was performing a low altitude backwards loop and likely did not account for the effects of the density altitude when performing the loop.
- August 27 – Silk Road International General Aviation Convention (Shaoguan Danxia Airport, Guangdong Province, China) – Red Bull stunt pilot Michel Leusch died when his XtremeAir XA-42 spiraled out of control and crashed into the ground.
- August 14 – Herne Bay Air Show (Herne Bay, Kent, England) – A pilot suffered minor injuries while ditching his Druine D.31 Turbulent in the water. The plane lost power after the balloons released for the pilot to pop with the plane's propeller became lodged in the engine's carburettor. An automatically inflating lifejacket trapped the pilot in the plane's cockpit, where he was later rescued from the sea by members of the public.
- July 22 – Vance AFB, Oklahoma – Aerobatic pilot Randy Harris and passenger Dale Shillington were killed when Harris' Steen Skybolt Biplane lost control while recovering from an aerobatic maneuver and crashed in a field.
- July 17 – Cold Lake Air Show (Alberta, Canada) – A T-28 biplane crashed before crowds of spectators, killing the pilot, Bruce Evans, upon impact. At the time of the accident, the pilot deviated from his planned series of maneuvers. The aircraft began a low-altitude roll, where it began to fall, dropping over 500 ft (150 m) and hitting the ground at high velocity. An investigation after the accident could not attribute the crash to either pilot error or mechanical issues.
- July 13 – Mesmer Family Block Party (Grand Island, New York) – Skydiver Jeffrey Antonich was seriously injured when he experienced a hard landing while performing during a privately held airshow in front of an estimated 1,000 spectators. Antonich hit the ground at roughly 40–50 mph (64–80 km/h).
- June 5 – Brimpton Airfield (Reading, England) – A de Havilland Tiger Moth crashed at a fly-in to raise funds for the local air ambulance, injuring a spectator.
- June 2 – United States Air Force Academy graduation ceremony (Colorado Springs, Colorado, ) – Major Alex Turner, Thunderbird No. 6, crashed in a field after performing a flyover at the. The F-16 pilot ejected and was unhurt. A later investigation revealed that the aircraft's engine was inadvertently shutdown at the start of landing procedures, when a faulty throttle trigger permitted the throttle to be rotated into an engine cut-off position.
- June 2 – Smyrna, Tennessee – Capt. Jeff "Kooch" Kuss of the Blue Angels died just after takeoff while performing the Split-S maneuver in his F/A-18 Hornet during a practice run for The Great Tennessee Air Show. Capt. Kuss ejected, but his parachute was immediately engulfed in flames, causing him to fall to his death. Kuss' body was recovered multiple yards away from the crash site. The Navy investigation found that Capt. Kuss performed the maneuver at too low of an altitude while failing to retard the throttle out of afterburner, causing him to fall too fast and recover at too low of an altitude. The investigation also found weather conditions and pilot fatigue as contributing causes to the crash.The cause of death was blunt force trauma to the head.
- May 28 – Hudson River, New York – Pilot Bill Gordon died after crash landing P-47 Thunderbolt, "Jacky's Revenge", into the Hudson River while attempting an emergency landing after an engine failure. The plane was participating in a photo flight near the Statue of Liberty to promote the Jones Beach airshow taking place the following day.
- May 14 – Good Neighbor Day Air Show (DeKalb-Peachtree Airport, Chamblee, Georgia) – Aerobatic pilot Greg Connell crashed and died during a performance, while piloting his self-modified Pitts-12, "Connell Model 12".
- April 17 – Cozumel Aero Show (Cozumel, Quintana Roo, Mexico) – Guatemalan pilot Juan Miguel García Salas died when his Extra EA-300L aerobatics plane crashed in a wooded area near Aeródromo Capitán Eduardo Toledo. The Directorate General of Civil Aeronautics, now the Federal Civil Aviation Agency (AFAC), found that this was likely the result of a G-LOC.

== 2015 ==
- December 20 – Air Force Flight School 70th Anniversary (Yogyakarta, Indonesia) – Two pilots, Lt. Col. Marda Sarjono and Capt. Diwi Cahyadi, were killed when their KAI T-50I Golden Eagle crashed during a performance.
- October 18 – Wings Over Houston (Harris County, Texas) – A skydiver was injured when he landed on a supply tent. It was reported that he did not hear the order cancelling the formation jump due to high winds.
- September 12 – Wings Over Big South Fork Air & Car Show (Scott County, Tennessee) – An Aero L-39 Albatros jet, piloted by Jay "Flash" Gordon of Louisville, Kentucky, crashed approximately two minutes after take-off due to an engine loss. The pilot was pronounced dead on scene.
- August 29 – Stewart International Airport, Newburgh , New York – An aerobatic pilot was killed when his 1998 Giles G-202 single-engine plane crashed in a marshy area while he was practicing for the New York Air Show. The investigation found that the vertical and horizontal stabilizers had separated from the plane, likely due to bad construction.
- August 23 – Dittingen, Basel, Switzerland – Two of three C-42B light aircraft flying in formation crashed after they touched in mid-air at an airshow. One pilot was killed when the automatic rescue system on his plane failed to activate and the aircraft crashed into a barn. The Swiss Transportation Safety Investigation Board (SUST) concluded that the pilots failed to see and avoid each other due to incomplete formation flying training.
- August 22 – Shoreham Airshow (Shoreham, West Sussex, England) – A Hawker Hunter T7 (G-BXFI/WV372) crashed onto the A27 arterial road (dual carriageway) between Lancing and Shoreham-by-Sea in England. Eleven people on the ground were killed and several others, including the pilot of the plane, were injured. Witnesses told local TV that the jet appeared to have crashed when it failed to pull out of a loop maneuver. The AAIB concluded that the maneuver "commenced from a height lower than the pilot’s authorised minimum for aerobatics, at an airspeed below his stated minimum, and proceeded with less than maximum thrust" although they could not determine if this was due to pilot error or mechanical issues. They also discussed several organizational issues with airshow safety in the UK. The pilot, standing trial in 2019 for manslaughter, claimed having become incapacitated by severe g-forces; he was acquitted of all charges.
- August 15 – Chicago Air & Water Show (Chicago, Illinois) – Sgt. First Class Corey Hood, 32, a member of the United States Army Parachute Team "Golden Knights" was critically injured when he struck an apartment building and fell to the ground, following a mid-air collision with another parachutist belonging to the United States Navy Parachute Team "Leap Frogs". He died at Northwestern Memorial Hospital the next day.
- August 1 – Carfest (Oulton Park, Cheshire, England) – Kevin Whyman died after his Folland Gnat T Mk1 crashed into the ground. The aircraft was carrying out an aileron roll at low level during a flying display when, at an angle of bank of 107° to the left, the nose attitude dropped relative to the horizon. The pilot reversed the direction of roll but also applied a large pitch input, which increased the rate of descent and caused the aircraft to depart controlled flight and impact with the ground.
- June 27 – Cameron Airshow (Cameron, Missouri) – Steven O’Berg died when his Pitts S2-B biplane spun into the ground.
- June 27 – Minnesota Air Spectacular (Mankato, Minnesota) – Two people received slight injuries when a six-year-old boy accidentally started a Eurocopter EC145 medical transport helicopter that was on display.
- February 19 – Aero India Airshow (Bangalore, India) – Two Zlín Z-50ZLX contacted each other mid-air while performing a wing over maneuver. Despite suffering damage in the collision, both aircraft, piloted by Radka Máchová and Jiří Saller, members of the Flying Bulls Aerobatic Team, landed safely. The pilot later said that the "airstreams were torn off the wings and the plane was uncontrollable at that moment".

== 2014 ==
- September 21 – Fly Venice 2014 (Giovanni Nicelli Airport, Venice, Italy) – Aerobatic and air show pilot Francesco Fornabaio was killed after crashing his Extreme 3000. The accident occurred when the pilot turned off the plane's engine during a roll, and the plane did not regain altitude.
- July 31 –Culdrose Air Day (RNAS Culdrose, Cornwall, England) – A Hawker Sea Fury crash landed while performing during the penultimate display of the airshow. The plane experienced significant engine vibration and a loss of thrust. The pilot landed the aircraft on the runway, where the landing gear collapsed and the plane veered off the runway. The pilot vacated the aircraft without injury.
- June 29 – Flying Circus Airshow (Bealeton, Virginia) – While performing a routine act in the Flying Circus Airshow, a Waco UPF-7 biplane experienced a total loss of power and was forced to make an emergency landing in an adjacent field. However, the landing roll was too fast for the pilot to safely stop the aircraft before it impacted a tree grove at the edge of the field, totally destroying the aircraft. The pilot managed to escape and walk away with minor injuries. A cause for the total power loss could not be determined.
- June 29 – Old Warden Airfield, Bedfordshire, England – The Shuttleworth Collection's Sopwith Triplane hit a fencepost on landing and ended up on its nose. The pilot, Roger "Dodge" Bailey, escaped unhurt, but the aircraft suffered wing, undercarriage and propeller damage.
- June 1 – Stevens Point Airshow (Stevens Point Municipal Airport, Stevens Point, Wisconsin) – Bill Cowden died when his Yakovlev Yak-55M stalled while recovering from an aerobatic maneuver.
- May 4 – Thunder Over Solano Airshow (Travis Air Force Base, Solano County, California) – Eddie Andreini died while flying his highly modified PR13D Super Stearman. The fatal accident occurred when he was attempting his signature low-altitude inverted ribbon cutting maneuver.
- March 7 – Qatar Mile Event (Al Khor Airport, Al Khor, Qatar) – Tamás Nádas died while he was doing an inverted low pass in his Zivko Edge 540. While in the inverted position, he lost control of his aircraft and plummeted to the ground. A report by the Dutch Safety Board on a different crash included this in a list of aerobatics accidents caused by pilot error.

== 2013 ==
- October 12 – Secunda Airshow (Secunda, Mpumalanga, South Africa) – Glen Dell suffered severe burns when his Extra EA-300 crashed. A few hours later, he died of his injuries at the local hospital. The South African Civil Aviation Authority (SACAA) found that the pilot was unable to recover from an inverted spin.
- August 17 – Lancaster Community Days Air Show (Lancaster Airport, Lancaster, Pennsylvania) – An Interstate L-6 Cadet stalled and crashed during takeoff while performing. The pilot appeared to be fine. The stall was caused by a sudden change in pitch attitude due to wake turbulence, as well as the pilot setting the trim incorrectly.
- June 29 – Rock 'N' Race (Luftfahrtmuseum Finowfurt, Finowfurt, Germany) – The pilot of a Zlín Z-526AFS Akrobat died when the airplane crashed while flying inverted. News articles at the time reported that the display did not appear to be part of the organized events. The German Federal Bureau of Aircraft Accident Investigation (BFU) found that the aircraft did not have a valid German registration or insurance at the time of the flight, was not certified for aerobatics and was flying lower than allowed for aerobatics routines. However, the proximate cause of the crash was engine impairment due to a lack of fuel followed by incorrect control inputs when the pilot tried to recover from inverted flight.
- June 23 – Quad City Airshow (Davenport, Iowa) – John Klatt was forced to land his MX Aircraft MXS after he experienced an engine failure. He released the aircraft's canopy, which had become coated with oil, in order to regain forward visibility to land. He suffered some minor burns and bruises, but was otherwise fine. The aircraft was in need of repairs.
- June 22 – Vectren Dayton Air Show (Dayton International Airport, Vandalia, Ohio) – Pilot Charlie Schwenker and wingwalker Jane Wicker were killed when Wicker's Boeing-Stearman IB75A struck the ground and burst into flames. The fatal accident occurred when the Stearman was transitioning to a low-level inverted pass, with Wicker hanging upside down by her ankles off the lower wing, and thus sitting right-side up while inverted. While flying inverted from the southeast to the northwest in front of the spectators, the aircraft's nose pitched slightly above the horizon. The aircraft abruptly rolled to the right and impacted terrain in a descending left-wing-low attitude. A post-impact fire ensued and consumed a majority of the right wing and front half of the fuselage.
- May 19 – Adana Air Show (Adana, Turkey) – Murat Öztürk died after he crashed his Pitts S-2B while participating in the airshow organized to celebrate Commemoration of Atatürk, Youth and Sports Day.
- May 5 – Fundacion Infante de Orleans Airshow (Cuatro Vientos, Madrid, Spain) – Pilot Ladislao Tejedor Romero was killed when his Hispano Aviación HA-200 crashed. The Civil Aviation Accident and Incident Investigation Commission(CIAIAC) found that the pilot performed an unscheduled maneuver at too low an altitude and airspeed, and did not have enough energy to recover from the maneuver.
- April 7 – Show Aéreo del Caribe (Santo Domingo, Dominican Republic) – First Lieutenant Rafael Sanchez and Second Lieutenant Carlos Manuel Guerrero crashed an ENAER T-35 Pillán. The aircraft pulled up and rolled inverted, but failed to recover from the dive following the maneuver. The pilot rolled upright, and the aircraft impacted the water. Both pilots died.
- March 17 – Classic Jets Original Parafield Airshow (Parafield Airport, Parafield, South Australia) – Roger Stokes, who was flying a Supermarine Aircraft Spitfire Mk26, an 80% scale home-build replica of the Supermarine Spitfire, died while completing a routine, when he crashed into a fence between two businesses in a commercial area on Frost Road in the nearby suburb of Salisbury. The ATSB found that the plane entered aerodynamic stall after an inadvertent loss of airspeed.
- January 23 – Ilopango Air Show (San Salvador, El Salvador) – Kirby Chambliss crashed his Zivko Edge 540 when the engine quit as he was executing a formation high alpha pass and landed at the end of the runway. The airplane was a total loss and Chambliss survived with bumps and bruises.

== 2012 ==
- September 29 – Bandung Air Show (Husein Sastranegara International Airport, Indonesia) – An AS/SA 202 Bravo, piloted by Nurman Lubis and Tonny Haryono and owned by the Indonesian Aerosport Federation, crashed. The plane appeared to be flying too low during its aerobatic routine and spun "out of control" before it hit the structure. Both pilots died.
- September 11 – Reno Air Races (Reno, Nevada) – A highly modified Hawker Sea Fury, nicknamed "Furias" and piloted by Matt Jackson, made a hard emergency landing when the right landing gear collapsed and veered off the runway. The pilot was uninjured. The NTSB determined that the landing gear failed due to a loss of hydraulic pressure.
- September 1 – Quad City Airshow (Davenport, Iowa) – Glenn Smith, a member of the HopperFlight Team died while executing a crossover break maneuver. His Aero L-39C Albatros failed to pull out of a 45-degree bank and crashed.
- August 4 – Wetaskiwin, Alberta, Canada – Kent Pietsch crashed his Jelly Belly 1942 Interstate Cadet just after the Wetaskiwin Air Show. Just after takeoff, the engine quit and he attempted to turn back for the runway but, with insufficient altitude, he landed adjacent to the runway and the aircraft hit a ditch, which ripped the wing off. Kent was taken to the hospital in stable condition. He has since returned to the airshow circuit.
- July 1 – Shuttleworth Military Pageant Airshow (Old Warden, Bedfordshire) – Trevor Roche died when his 1923 de Havilland DH.53 Humming Bird G-EBHX crashed while he was practicing.
- June 30 – Klerksdorp Air Show (Klerksdorp, South Africa) – Gianfranco Cicogna-Mozzoni died when his Aero L-39 Albatros was caught in the wake turbulence of the lead aircraft and suffered a compressor stall, then a high-speed wing stall, and hit the ground at a 50-degree angle. The plane exploded on impact.
- June 15 – Legacy Airshow Preview (Rexburg, Idaho) – A Christen Eagle piloted by Ryland "Buck" Roetman crashed while performing a series of outside snap rolls when the engine lost oil pressure. The pilot guided the airplane onto an adjacent golf course where it skidded and hit a tree. The pilot suffered a sprained ankle; the aircraft was destroyed.
- June 3 – Wings over Gillespie (El Cajon, California) – A Fairey Firefly AS.6 WB518 suffered a landing gear collapse on runway 27R. The pilot was uninjured.

== 2011 ==
- October 14 – China International General Aviation Convention (Weinan, Pucheng, Shaanxi, China) – The fourth prototype Xian JH-7A, 814, of the China Flight Test Establishment of the People's Liberation Army Air Force crashed into a marsh while performing in an airshow associated with the convention. The airframe came down about one mile (1.6 km) from Pucheng Neifu Airport. One pilot ejected safely but the second crewman was killed.
- September 17 – Thunder Over the Blue Ridge Open House and Air Show (Martinsburg, West Virginia) – A T-28C Trojan, N688GR, crashed during the airshow, killing pilot John Mangan. The investigation concluded that he was impaired or incapacitated while performing a maneuver, due to complications from a recent heart attack.
- September 16 – Reno Air Races (Reno, Nevada) – Pilot Jimmy Leeward lost control of his highly modified P-51D Mustang, The Galloping Ghost, which crashed into spectators and was instantly destroyed. Ten spectators were killed, 69 spectators were injured and Leeward was instantly killed. The NTSB investigated the incident and found that the plane was traveling about 445 knots (510 mph; 825 km/h) when it experienced a left roll upset at 17.3 Gs and a section of the left elevator trim tab separated in flight. Deteriorated locknut inserts allowed trim tab attachment screws to become loose, ultimately leading to aerodynamic flutter at racing speeds.
- August 21 – Selfridge Air National Guard Base Air Show (Harrison Township, Michigan) – Wing walker Todd Green fell 200 feet (60 m) while attempting an aircraft transfer from a Stearman to a Hughes 369 helicopter. He was seriously injured and taken to the hospital, where he was pronounced dead.
- August 20 – Bournemouth Air Festival (Bournemouth, England) – A BAE Hawk T1, flying as part of the Royal Air Force Aerobatic Team Red Arrows, crashed after performing at the air show. The aircraft was witnessed to have plunged into the ground next to the River Stour, near the village of Throop. The pilot, 33-year-old Flt. Lt. Jon Egging, was killed in the crash. The Military Aviation Authority (MAA) found that "the most likely cause of the accident to XX179 was G-induced impairment (A-LOC) of the pilot leading to flight into terrain".
- August 20 – Kansas City Airshow (Kansas City, Missouri) – Stunt pilot Bryan Jensen was killed when his modified Pitts 12, "The Beast", crashed at the Charles B. Wheeler Downtown Airport due to an unexplainable impairment inflight that led to a loss of airplane control.
- July 28 – EAA AirVenture Oshkosh (Oshkosh, Wisconsin) – A General Dynamics F-16C Fighting Falcon, 87–296, of the 187th Fighter Wing, Alabama Air National Guard, flying out of Montgomery Air National Guard Base, overran the runway at Wittman Regional Airport. The nose gear collapsed, the nose radome broke and the air-frame skidded to a stop. The pilot was uninjured.
- July 9 – Geneseo Air Show (Geneseo, New York) – A replica Fokker Dr.I lost power at about 600 ft (180 m) above the ground during a mock dogfight. The pilot, 67-year-old Joseph Auger, attempted a controlled powerless glide, but the landing gear got caught on cornstalks and flipped over. The pilot extricated himself from the wreckage and sustained only minor injuries.
- June 18 – Plock, Poland – A Christen Eagle II aircraft crashed into the River Wisla. The pilot, Marek Szufa, who was also a Boeing 767 pilot for the Polish airline, LOT, died three hours later in a hospital. In his life, he spent 20,000 hours in the air and took part in many air shows and championships. The State Commission on Aircraft Accidents Investigation (SCAAI) determined that the pilot was unable to recover from a dive, as the minimum flight altitude allowed for the show was too low.
- June 4 – Wings and Wheels (Nanaimo Airport, British Columbia, Canada) – 71-year-old Bill Phipps, an experienced pilot from Campbell River, British Columbia pilot, was severely injured while performing aerobatics in his self-built Steen Skybolt.
- March 26 – Wings Over Flagler (Flagler County Airport, Florida) – A Yakovlev Yak-52 crashed. It is reported that 58-year-old "Wild Bill" Walker experienced G-LOC during an aerobatic "heart" maneuver and was fatally injured in the resulting crash.
- March 12 – CAF Air Fiesta (Brownsville, Texas) – Wingwalkers Kyle and Amanda Franklin were severely injured while performing their Pirated Skies wing walking act. The accident occurred when their Waco JMF-7, nicknamed "Mystery Ship", suffered an apparent engine failure and lost power. Amanda climbed off the wing into the cockpit before the forced landing, but the plane caught fire upon impact. Both were initially listed as in stable condition with burns covering more than 60% of their bodies. Kyle's burns were not as serious as first reported and he made a full recovery. Amanda had successful surgery on March 16, and was believed to have a good recovery chance at that time, but died just over two months later on May 27. Amanda's father, Bobby Younkin, had been killed at the Saskatchewan Centennial Air Show in 2005.

== 2010 ==
- September 14 – Shoreham Airshow (Shoreham, West Sussex, England) – A Swift S-1 glider crashed nose first into the runway after performing an aerobatic display. The pilot suffered three broken vertebrae in the accident, after the cockpit crumpled upon impact.
- September 5 – Lauf-Lillinghof Airport, Nuremberg, Germany – A woman was killed when a De Havilland Tiger Moth biplane crashed into spectators at an air show. Thirty-eight other people were injured in the accident, five of them seriously. Four years later, a trial in Hersbrucker District Court determined that the cause of the crash was pilot error, finding the pilot guilty of "fahrlässiger Tötung und fahrlässiger Körperverletzung" (involuntary manslaughter and negligent injury)."
- July 27 – EAA AirVenture Oshkosh (Oshkosh, Wisconsin) – A Hawker Beechcraft 390, piloted by Jack Roush of Roush Performance, crashed after stalling at low altitude while arriving at the air show. Roush was hospitalized for a fractured back, broken jaw, and the loss of his left eye, before being released from the hospital on August 12, 2010. The NTSB determined Roush to be at fault for the accident.
- June 19 – Methley Bridge Boatyard, near Castleford, West Yorkshire – Pilot Chris Penistone was killed flying an Extra EA-300L, while performing a display routine. His plane crashed into the ground as he tried to initiate a recovery from a flat spin at a "height lower than required".
- April 10 – Red Bull Air Races (Perth, Australia) – A MXS-R race plane, piloted by Adilson Kindlemann, crashed into the Swan River outside of Perth prior to participating in the races The pilot was hospitalized but suffered no serious injury, while the plane was destroyed.
- April 2 – Santa Catarina, Brazil – Pilot Captain Anderson Amaro Fernandes was killed when the Embraer EMB 312 Tucano he was flying as part of the "Esquadrilha da Fumaça" aerobatic team of the Brazilian Air Force crashed while performing at a ceremony. After the accident, the Brazilian Air Force temporarily suspended aerobatic shows by its Aerial Demonstrations Squadron.
- March 3 – India Aviation Show (Hyderabad, India) – Pilot Commander Suresh Kumar Maurya and his co-pilot Lieutenant Commander Rahul Nair were killed when the HAL Kiran aircraft they were flying crashed into a building. The pilots were members of the Indian Navy's Sagar Pawan aerobatic team and were performing at the opening ceremony of the air show. Apart from the two pilots, one person was killed on the ground and at least 5 others injured.

== 2009 ==
- November 14 – Overberg Airshow (Bredasdorp, South Africa) – An English Electric Lightning of Thunder City experienced a rear fuselage fire leading to hydraulic failure while performing. The pilot, Dave Stock, 46, tried to get the aircraft back to base but, after the failure of the canopy jettison system, he was unable to use the ejection seat and the aircraft crashed, killing the pilot.
- September 6 – Brixia Airshow (Montichiari, Italy) – A CAP-10B aircraft hit the ground while performing low altitude aerobatics. Of the two pilots, Marzio Maccarana, 26, was killed and Paolo Castellani, 55, was injured.
- August 30 – Radom Air Show (Radom, Poland) – A Sukhoi Su-27 aircraft from Belarus crashed while performing. Both pilots, Col. Alexander Morfintsky and Col. Alexander Zhuravlevich, were killed in the crash.
- July 4 – July 4 Air Show (Tehachapi, California) – A L-29 Delfín crashed while making low altitude passes. Pilot Dave Zweigle and passenger Robert Chamberlain were killed in the accident.

== 2008 ==
- August 18 – Old Rhinebeck Airport, Rhinebeck, New York – Vincent Nasta of Wading River, New York was flying a replica French WW1 Nieuport 24 in a simulated dogfight with a German plane when he lost control and crashed about 1,000 feet (300 m) from the Aerodrome. The plane landed in a wooded area and caught fire. Nasta, 47, was the sole occupant.
- June 1 – Lake Bracciano Air Show (Lake Bracciano, Province of Rome, Italy) – Aircraft Commander Captain Filippo Fornassi was killed and co-pilot Captain Fabio Manzella was injured when their NH Industries NH90 tactical transport helicopter struck the water and sank into Lake Bracciano. The crash happened while the helicopter was diving after completing a Fieseler Maneuver.
- May 10 – Modesto Airport Appreciation Day (Modesto, California) – Pilot Rob Harrison was injured when the Moravan Otrokovice Zlin 50LX aircraft he was piloting crashed while performing a roll maneuver. The airport was actively being serviced by aircraft during the show, and the NTSB concluded that task overload caused by the airshow pilots using the same radio frequency as the ATC contributed to the accident.
- April 26 – Kindel Air Field, Kindel, Germany – A Zlin Z-37 Cmelak left the runway on takeoff and veered into a crowd of spectators, killing two and injuring eighteen. The BFU determined that the pilot was inadequately trained on the Cmelak, stalled the aircraft on takeoff and failed to abort takeoff when it stalled. The pilot was convicted of "two counts of negligent homicide, negligent bodily harm in 17 cases, and negligent endangerment of air traffic".
- April 26 – Spirit of Flight 2008 Air Show (Galveston, Texas) – A Supermarine Spitfire taxied into the rear of a recently restored Hawker Hurricane at the Lone Star Flight Museum airshow. No injuries were reported.

== 2007 ==
- September 15 – Shoreham Airshow (Shoreham, West Sussex, England) – Pilot Brian Brown was killed when the Hawker Hurricane he was flying failed to pull out of a dive following an unplanned and unpracticed roll performed as part of a mock dogfight.
- September 1 – Radom Air Show (Radom, Poland) – Pilots Piotr Banachowicz and Lech Marchelewski were killed in the mid-air collision of their Zlin Z-526 aircraft.
- July 28 – Dayton Air Show (Dayton, Ohio) – Jim LeRoy was killed when his S2S Bulldog II crashed at the end of the runway while performing a 1/2 Cuban 8 and snap rolls. The NTSB attributed this accident to pilot error.
- July 27 – EAA AirVenture Oshkosh (Oshkosh, Wisconsin) – While approaching the runway for a landing, pilot Gerry Beck's scratch-built P-51A Mustang overtook and struck a P-51D Mustang that had touched down ahead of him. Beck's plane flipped over and crashed along the runway, killing him. The other pilot was not injured, although his P-51D was pushed on its nose and sustained damage to the tail.
- June 24 – Galway Air Show (Galway, Ireland) – Three people on the ground were injured when the door from a hovering RAF helicopter flew off and plunged into a large crowd below.
- April 21 – Marine Corps Air Station Beaufort, Beaufort, South Carolina – Lieutenant Commander Kevin 'Kojak' Davis of the Blue Angels was killed when he grayed out and lost control of his F/A-18 Hornet, which then crashed.
- March 16 – Tico Airshow (Titusville, Florida) – Pilot Eilon Krugman-Kadi was killed when the Aero L-39 Albatros he was piloting crashed while performing a loop.

== 2006 ==
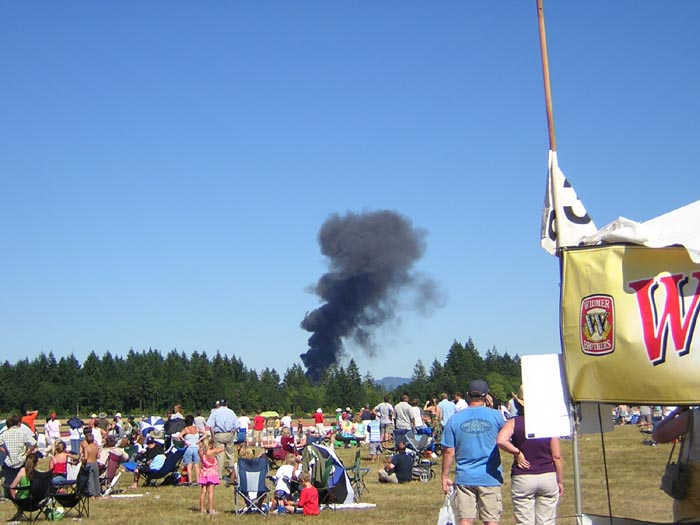
Smoke from a crashed Hawker Hunter at the Oregon International Airshow Hillsboro, Oregon, July 16, 2006

- October 14 – Culpeper Airfest (Culpeper Regional Airport, Culpeper, Virginia) – Pilot Nancy Lynn was severely burned when the wingtip of her Extra 300L struck the ground and burst into flames after performing multiple snap rolls on a downline. Lynn succumbed to her injuries later that night at the University of Virginia Medical Center in Charlottesville, Virginia. Lynn's son, Pete Muntean, was narrating her routine when the accident occurred.
- October 4 – Tucumcari Air Show (Tucumcari, New Mexico) – Pilot Guy "Doc" Baldwin was killed when he lost control of his Extra 300L while performing a loop. The NTSB investigation found that the plane entered an accelerated stall, partially due to the low altitude for recovery and high density altitude.
- September 10 – Aero GP (Marsamxett Harbour, Malta) – Pilot Gabor Varga was killed when the Yak-55 aircraft he was piloting was involved in a mid-air collision with an Extra EA-200. Eddie Goggins, who was piloting an Extra 200, received minor injuries.
- July 30 – EAA AirVenture Oshkosh (Oshkosh, Wisconsin) – The passenger of a Van's Aircraft RV-6 was killed when the propeller of a Grumman TBM-3 Avenger cut into the fuselage of the RV-6. Both aircraft were taxiing for takeoff at the time of the accident. No injuries were reported from the occupants of the Avenger.
- July 23 – Vestival Aéreo Vigo (Samil Beach, Vigo, Spain) – A Spanish Guardia Civil MBB Bo 105CB-2 crashed on the beach during an air show.
- July 22 – Denver Air Festival (Denver, Colorado) – Professional skydiver Mariann Kramer (37) of Dallas, died when her parachutes failed to open. The accident occurred away from the event's main viewing area. An experienced parachutist, she was the first woman to compete on the Pro Swooping Tour.
- July 16 – Oregon International Airshow (Hillsboro, Oregon) – Pilot Robert E. Guilford was killed when his Hawker-Siddeley Hunter Mk 58 lost power and crashed into a residence. Guilford was leaving the airshow at the time of the crash.
- May 5 – Children's Day flight exhibition (Suwon Air Base, South Korea) – Captain Kim Do-hyun of the Republic of Korea Air Force's Black Eagles display team was killed when he lost control of his Cessna A-37B Dragonfly.

== 2005 ==
- August 24 – Thunder in the Air Airshow warm-up – (Thunder Bay, Ontario) – Capt. Andrew Mackay of the Canadian Forces Snowbirds safely ejected from his CT-114 Tutor.
- July 26 – Wittman Regional Airport (Oshkosh, Wisconsin) – Pilot Richard James was killed when his North American F-51D crashed for "undetermined reasons" while waiting in a holding pattern to perform a "missing man" formation flyover at an airshow.
- July 23 – Wings Over Oklahoma Air Show (Claremore, Oklahoma) – The pilot of a Yakovlev Yak-52 was killed when he crashed inverted and the aircraft caught fire while flying over the runway.
- July 10 – Saskatchewan Centennial Air Show (Moose Jaw, Saskatchewan) – Pilots Jimmy Franklin and Bobby Younkin were killed in a mid-air collision during a dogfight routine. At the time of the accident, Franklin was piloting a Waco UPF-7 biplane, and Younkin was piloting a Wolf-Samson biplane, a 1980s replica of the 1948 Pitts Samson. The pilots were performing their signature "Masters of Disaster" show, a routine which they had performed for over five years.

== 2004 ==
- October 15 – Marine Corps Air Station Miramar Air Show (Miramar, California) – Stunt pilot Sean DeRosier was killed when his self-built "Cabo Wabo SkyRocker" failed to pull out of a dive.
- October 2 – Santa Fe Airshow (Santa Fe, New Mexico) – Pilot Richard Bobbitt was killed when his 1993 Sukhoi SU-29 stalled and crashed while performing a torque roll.
- April 30 – Fort Lauderdale, Florida – Featured performer and aerobatic pilot Ian Groom died while practicing for the Fort Lauderdale Air & Sea Show when his Sukhoi Su-31 dove into the Atlantic Ocean after performing a flat spin.

== 2003 ==
- September 15 – Gunfighter Skies Air Show (Mountain Home AFB, Idaho) – A F-16C crashed due to pilot error. The official report states that the pilot "misinterpreted the altitude required to complete the "Split S" maneuver". The pilot successfully ejected and suffered minor injuries. No other injuries were reported.
- September 13 – Moffett Federal Airfield (Mountain View, California) – A pilot suffered minor injuries when his Aviat Pitts S-2C biplane crashed inverted following the wing striking the ground while performing low altitude rolls.
- July 12 – Flying Legends Air Show (Duxford, Cambridgeshire, England) – Lieutenant Commander Bill Murton and Neil Rix were killed when the Fairey Firefly they were in went into a "rapid and unexplained" nosedive and never recovered. The plane crashed on the eastern side of the M11 motorway. The investigation suggested numerous potential causes including pilot distraction, pilot disorientation and the plane running with too little power, but noted that the exact cause was "a matter of conjecture".
- May 31 – Coventry Classic Airshow (Coventry, West Midlands, England) – Swedish pilot Pierre Holländer was killed when his homebuilt replica of Charles Lindbergh's Spirit of St. Louis aircraft crashed. The right wing of the plane broke up at altitude about 100 ft (30 m) due to fatigue cracking.
- March 22 – Gulf Coast Salute 2003 Airshow (Panama City, Florida) – Pilot Chris Smisson was killed when his Technoavia SP-95 failed to recover from performing a loop and crashed.

== 2002 ==
- November 10 – Celebrate Freedom Festival Airshow (Columbia, South Carolina) – Pilot Joe Tobul was killed when his F4U-4 Corsair lost power due to an inflight engine fire and crashed in a field. At the time of the crash, the plane was part of a flyover formation.
- October 2 – Winged Stallions Silver Jubilee Celebrations (Dabolim Naval Air Base, Goa, India) – Two Ilyushin Il-38 reconnaissance aircraft collided while flying in formation during the Indian Navy's Squadron 315 celebrations. 17 people were killed, including all twelve crew members on board the two aircraft. Sixteen civilians were injured. The planes were flying parallel to each other in close formation in front of many naval high-ranking officials and their families when their wings touched. Both planes caught fire and crashed into a residential area; one plane landed on a house under construction, killing three construction workers instantly.
- September 29 – Pickaway County Memorial Airport, Circleville, Ohio – The pilot of a North American AT-6D was killed when his aircraft stalled and crashed while climbing and turning, following a low level formation flyover at an exhibition.
- August 2 – Lowestoft Seafront Air Festival (Lowestoft, Suffolk, England) – Flight Lieutenant Tony Cann safely ejected from the Harrier GR7 he was piloting after an engine failure. He was performing a 'bow' maneuver at an approximate altitude of 50 feet over the sea at the time of the accident. Footage of the air show crash was featured on various reality television shows, such as Destroyed in Seconds (2008–09) and Most Daring (2007–2010).
- July 27 – Sknyliv Airfield, Lviv, Ukraine – Pilot Volodymyr Toponar and co-pilot Yuriy Yegorov of the Ukrainian Air Force demonstration team, the Ukrainian Falcons, ejected from their Sukhoi Su-27 after the left wing struck the ground during a low altitude roll maneuver. The aircraft then struck a parked Ilyushin Il-76 transport and cartwheeled into a crowd of spectators, killing 77 people, including 28 children, and injuring over 500.
- July 21 – White Waltham Airfield, Berkshire, England– A pilot was injured during a charity airshow for Thames Valley Air Ambulance when his de Havilland Tiger Moth biplane lost altitude rapidly and crash-landed, throwing the 55-year-old pilot clear of the wreckage. The AAIB suggested that the pilot may have inadvertently flown the Tiger Moth, which requires "light control forces", in the way he would fly a Zlin, which requires "robust control inputs" and which he had flown in just before the Tiger Moth display.
- July 20 – Royal International Air Tattoo Airshow (Fairford, Gloucestershire, England) – An Italian Aeritalia G.222 transport made a hard landing which collapsed the nose landing gear. A small fire erupted but was quickly extinguished. No injuries were reported.
- April 20 – Point Mugu Airshow (Point Mugu, California) – Navy pilot Commander Michael Norman and radar intercept officer Marine Corps Captain Andrew Muhs were killed when their McDonnell-Douglas QF-4S+ Phantom II stalled and crashed after pulling away from a diamond formation. The Navy report stated that the cause of the accident was "the failure of the pilot to manage the energy state of the aircraft, and then to recognize a departure from controlled flight at low altitude, and apply the NATOPS recovery techniques."

== 2001 ==
- August 11 – Michelstadt, Germany – During an airshow, a Fokker Dr.1 replica triplane crashed into a field outside the show area, killing the pilot. The BFU report says that the cause of the accident was a damaged piece of metal in the vertical stabilizer that broke during flight and made the vertical stabilizer, and thus the whole plane, uncontrollable.
- July 9 – Sarnia International Airshow (Sarnia, Ontario, Canada) – Pilot Carey Moore was killed when his newly restored Hawker Sea Fury stalled during a tight bank just east of the airport, crashing into a soybean field. Pilot Moore was about to commence his third pass when he lost power while banking to return to show centre.
- June 4 – Rouen, France – Pilot Martin Sargeant was killed while making an emergency landing in his Supermarine Spitfire, due to engine failure. He tried to land on the designated emergency grass strip, but it was occupied by spectators. In an attempt to turn to a hard runway, his aircraft stalled and crashed.
- June 3 – Biggin Hill Airshow (Biggin Hill, London, England) – A 1944 Bell P-63 Kingcobra crashed, killing the pilot, former Red Arrow Guy Bancroft-Wilson. The American World War II fighter aircraft had been flying an unplanned sequence when the pilot lost control at the top of a climbing maneuver and was unable to recover from the resulting dive. The aircraft impacted the ground to the west of the runway in a steep nose down attitude. The incident was captured on video.
- June 2 – Biggin Hill Airshow (Biggin Hill, London, England) – A vintage de Havilland Vampire jet crashed, killing both pilots. The Vampire had been flying a display in tandem with a Sea Vixen. The likely cause of the accident was that the Vampire's flight path had been disrupted by wake turbulence from the larger aircraft.

== See also ==
- List of accidents and incidents involving commercial aircraft
- List of air show accidents and incidents in the 20th century
- List of air shows
- List of news aircraft accidents and incidents
- Lists of accidents and incidents involving military aircraft
