= Francesco Fornabaio =

Italian aviator

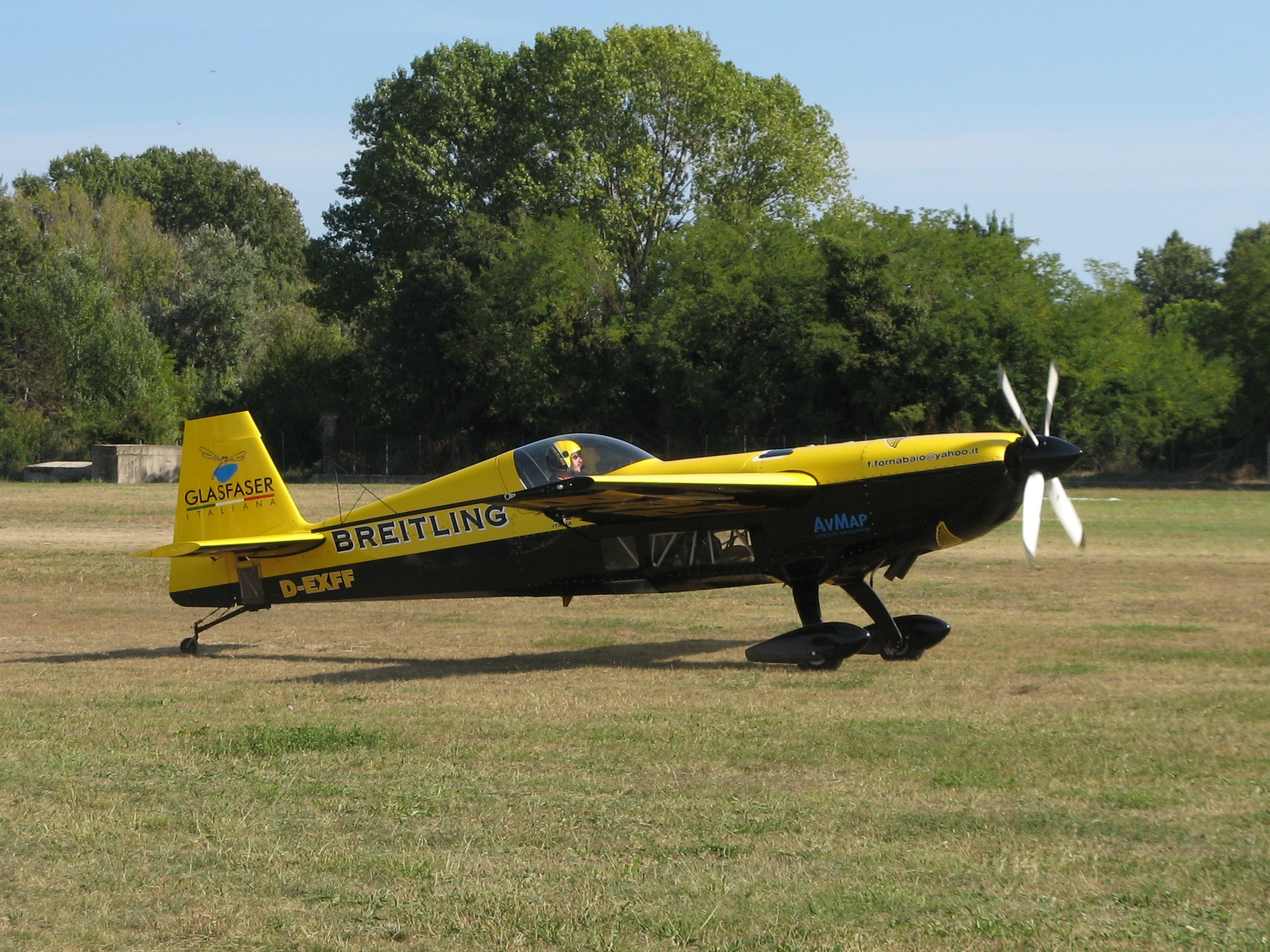
Francesco Fornabaio at Venice-Lido Airport in 2013.

Francesco Fornabaio (5 March 1957 – 21 September 2014) was an Italian aviator and aerobatic pilot.

== Birth ==
Fornabaio was born in Stigliano.

== Death ==
Fornabaio was killed in a plane crash at the "Fly Venice" air show at Lido di Venezia.

== See also ==
- List of air show accidents and incidents in the 21st century
