= Venice Airport (disambiguation) =

Venice Airport may refer to:

- Venice Marco Polo Airport
- Venice-Lido Airport
- Treviso Airport
- Venice Municipal Airport
