= MDJ =

MDJ may refer to:

- Marietta Daily Journal, a periodical published in Maretta, Georgia, United States
- Madras Municipal Airport, IATA airport code
- Monthly Dragon Junior, a Japanese magazine
- La Mujer de Judas, a Venezuelan telenovela
