= Luskintyre Airfield =

Airport in New South Wales, Australia

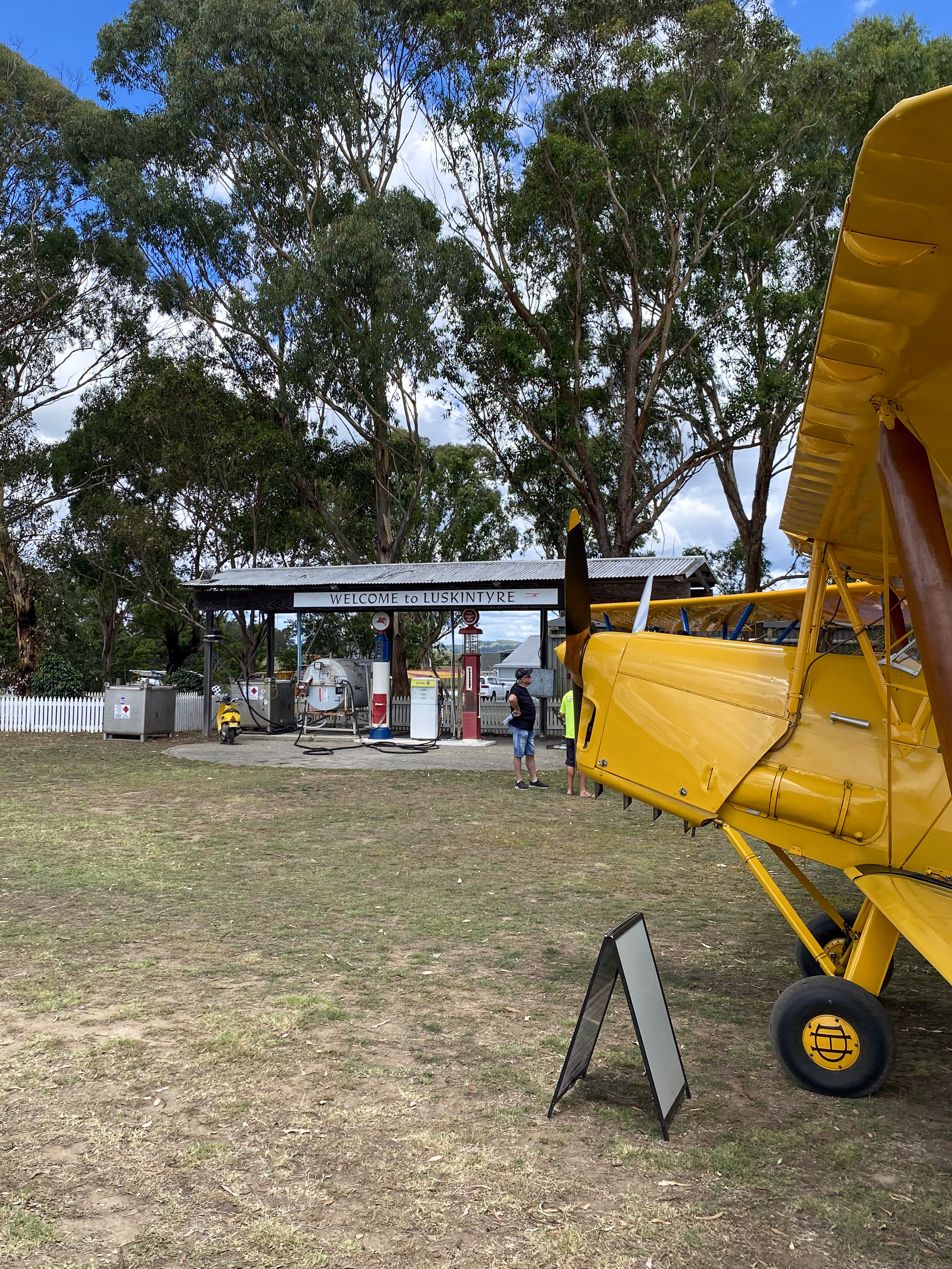
- de Havilland Tiger Moth at the Luskintyre Airfield Fuel Bowser
- IATA: none; ICAO: YLSK

Summary
- Airport type: Private
- Owner: Luskintyre Aviation Flying Museum
- Location: Luskintyre, New South Wales
- Elevation AMSL: 100 ft (30 m)
- Coordinates: 32°40′S 151°025′E

Map
- Location in New South Wales

Runways
Direction	Length		Surface
Direction	m	ft	Surface
12/30	800	2,625	Grass
16/34	975	3,199	Grass

Luskintyre Airfield is a private aerodrome in the Hunter Valley of New South Wales, Australia. The airfield is located in Luskintyre, approximately 19 km (12 mi) north west of Maitland. The airfield site has an area of 92.2 ha (228 acres) and is home to the Luskintyre Aviation Flying Museum; and is primarily used for the restoration of vintage aircraft, particularly de Havilland Tiger Moths. The museum has the largest fleet of operational Tiger Moths in Australia. There are five hangars on the property used for storage and restoration.

== History and events ==
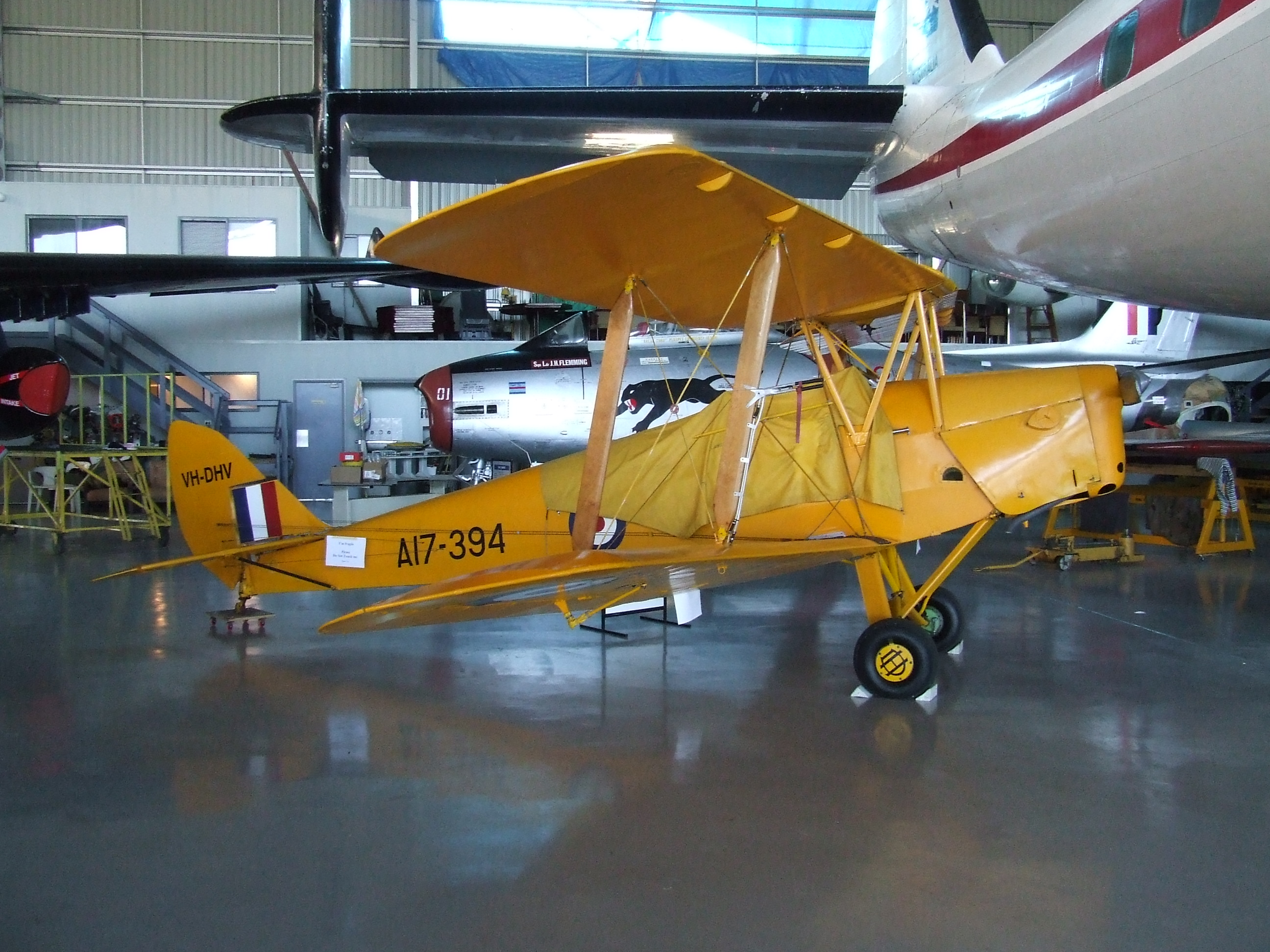
A Tiger Moth similar to those under restoration at Luskintyre

The property was purchased from a local dairy farmer in 1977 by a group of local pilots with the aim of creating their own private airfield, restoring and operating vintage aircraft. A company specialising in the repair and restoration of early de Havilland aircraft was later relocated from Dungog by its then owner Ray Windred and has operated from a hangar on the airfield for over 30 years.

On 1 May 1994 at Luskintyre a Tiger Moth was to do a wing walking display for a group of canteen kids (kids with cancer). On take-off a carburettor fault caused a loss of engine power, the port wing stalled and the aircraft spun into the ground and burst into flames. Both the pilot and the wing-walker were killed in the accident.

In October 2003, Tiger Moths from Luskintyre participated in The Great Tiger Moth Air Race, an event celebrating 100 years of powered flight and sponsored by aircraft manufacturer Airbus. In September 2010, the airfield hosted flying displays and events coinciding with the 100th anniversary of the first de Havilland aircraft.

'Lunch with the Tiger Moths' is a regular event held on the first Saturday of each month (weather permitting). The event allows visitors to inspect airworthy and under-restoration Tiger Moths and view the museum's collection of memorabilia.

Many recreational pilots as well as professional pilots use the airfield. It is also frequented by aerobatic champion Paul Bennet, and his formation flying team the SkyAces.
