= Erickson Aircraft Collection =

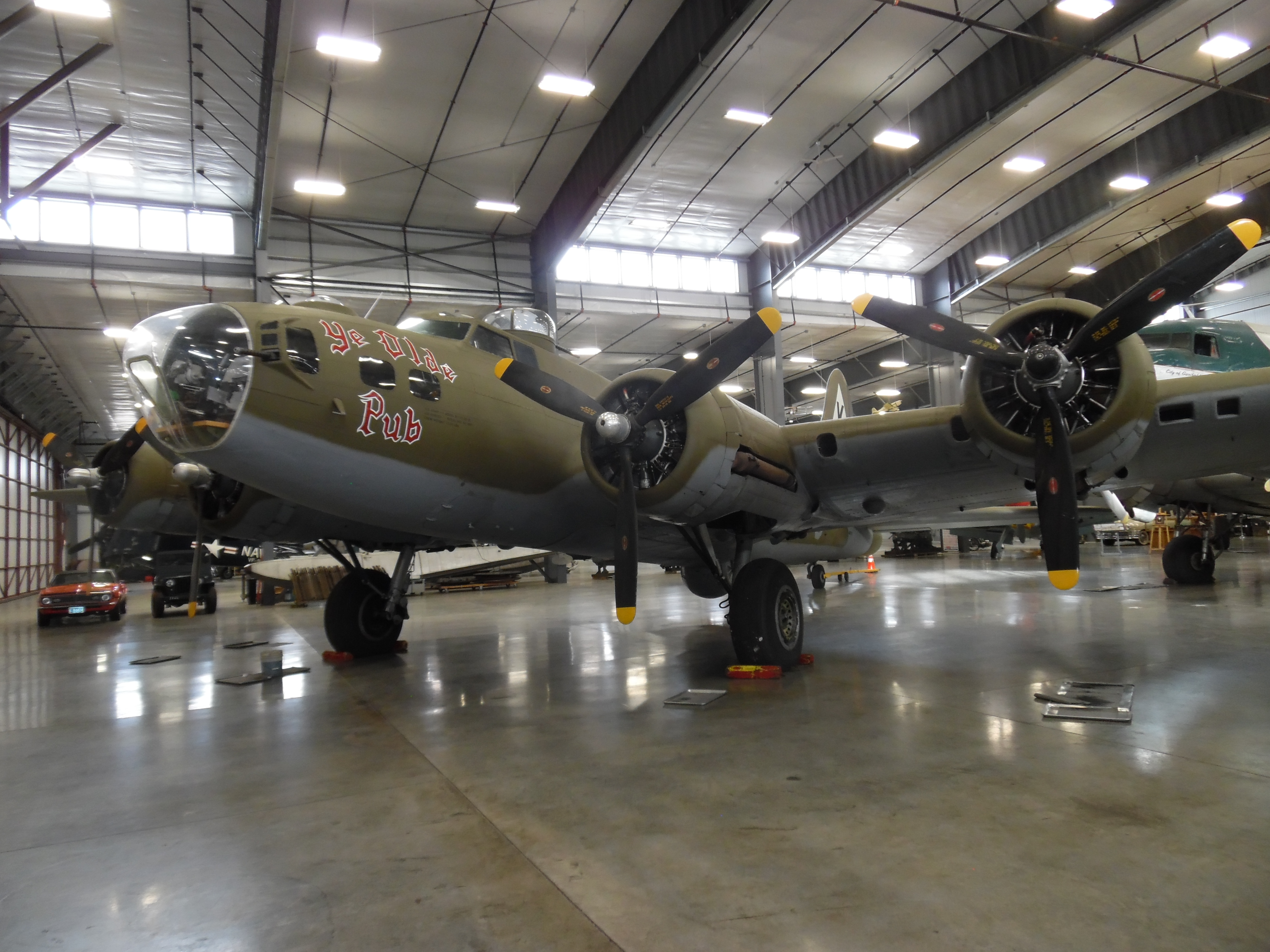
- Erickson Collection's B-17 Flying Fortress

- Location within Oregon
- Established: 1983
- Location: Madras, Oregon
- Coordinates: 44.670°N 121.150°W
- Type: Aviation museum
- Founder: Jack Ericson
- Website: www.ericksoncollection.com

The Erickson Aircraft Collection is an aviation museum located at the Madras Municipal Airport in Madras, Oregon.

== History ==
=== Background ===
Jack Erickson, the founder of Erickson Air-Crane, purchased his first warbird, a P-51, in 1980. Three years later, he purchased a Corsair and a Spitfire and began his collection. In 1991, it was placed on loan to the Tillamook Air Museum. However, in April 2013, the collection announced it would not be renewing its lease on the museum. A few months later, the collection purchased a B-17 and reproduction Fw 190 from the Military Aviation Museum.

=== Move to Madras ===
The collection moved to a new 65,000 sq ft (6,000 m^{2}) facility at the Madras Municipal Airport in Madras, Oregon in May 2014.

The collection repainted its B-17 as Ye Olde Pub in 2019. (Note: The aircraft had previously been repainted as Madras Maiden by the collection.)

Shortly after being purchased by the Mid-America Flight Museum in 2020, a B-17G from the Lone Star Flight Museum was ferried to the museum for an inspection.

The collection's Corsair and Skyraider were used in the filming of the 2022 movie Devotion.

== Collection ==
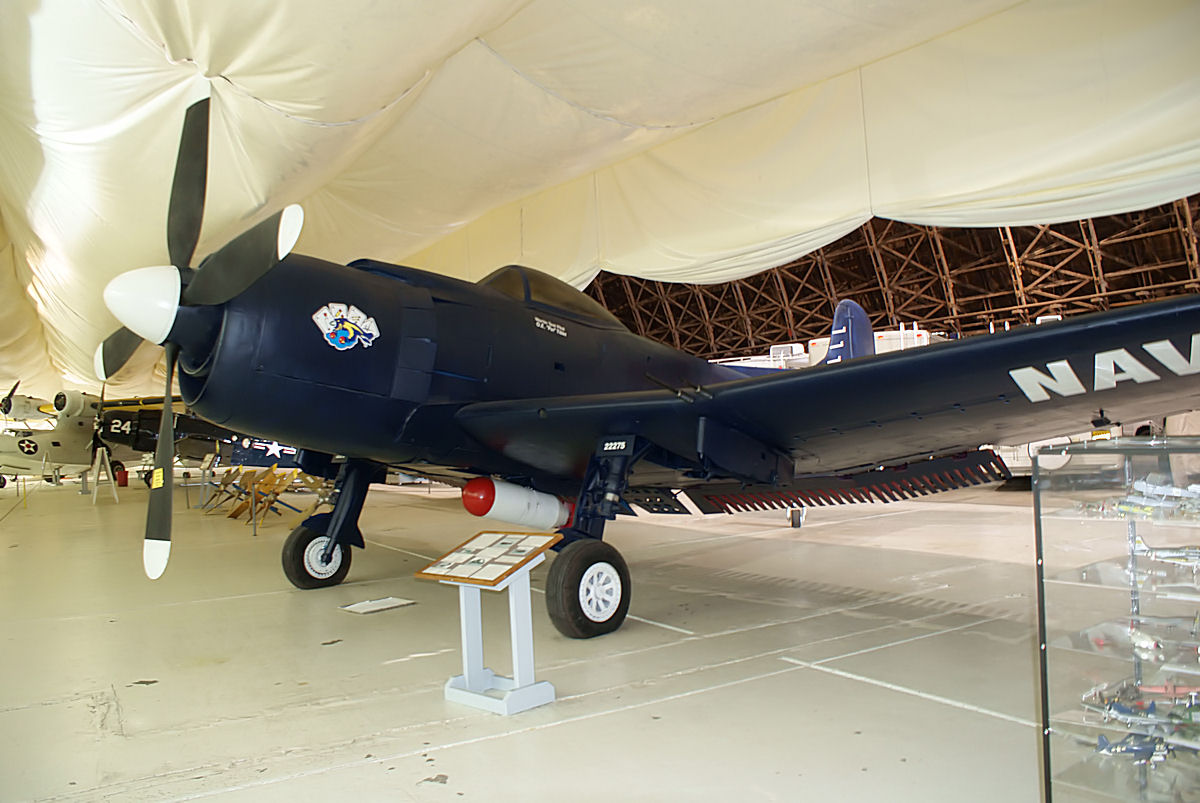
Martin AM-1 Mauler at the collection's previous location

- Aero L-29 Delfin
- Bell P-39 Airacobra
- Bellanca Aircruiser
- Boeing B-17F Flying Fortress
- Boeing PT-17 Stearman
- CAC CA-17 Mustang
- Columbia J2F-6 Duck
- Consolidated PBY-5A Catalina
- Curtiss P-40E Warhawk
- Douglas A-24A Banshee
- Douglas A-26B Invader
- Douglas AD-4W Skyraider
- Douglas C-47B Skytrain
- Focke-Wulf Fw 190 A-8 – reproduction
- General Motors FM-2 Wildcat
- General Motors TBM-3E Avenger
- Grumman F6F-5 Hellcat
- Grumman F8F-2 Bearcat
- Hispano HA-1112 – restored to resemble a Bf 109
- Lockheed P-38L Lightning
- Lockheed P2V-7 Neptune
- Lockheed PV-2D Harpoon
- Martin AM-1 Mauler
- Nakajima Ki-43 Hayabusa – reproduction
- North American TB-25N Mitchell
- North American T-6G Texan
- Republic P-47D Thunderbolt
- Vought F4U-7 Corsair

== Events ==
The museum holds an airshow called the Airshow of the Cascades once a year.

== See also ==
- List of aviation museums
