= Airshow of the Cascades =

- Genre: Air show
- Dates: August
- Frequency: Annually
- Venue: Madras Municipal Airport
- Location: Madras, Oregon
- Coordinates: 44°40′13″N 121°09′18″W
- Country: United States
- Established: 1970s
- Attendance: 10,000
- Website: www.cascadeairshow.com

The Airshow of the Cascades is an annual event held in August at the Madras Municipal Airport in Central Oregon. It started in a field outside of Madras in the 1970s and draws around 10,000 people with around 150 aircraft on display.

== History ==
The show began in the late 1970s at rancher Ron Ochs's alfalfa field near Madras. In 2000, the airshow moved to the Madras Municipal Airport. Planes from the Erickson Aircraft Collection became part of the show in 2014 when a new museum housing the collection opened at the Madras Airport.

There was no airshow in 2020.
