= Samil Beach =

Beach in Spain

Coordinates: 42°12′36″N 8°46′35″W

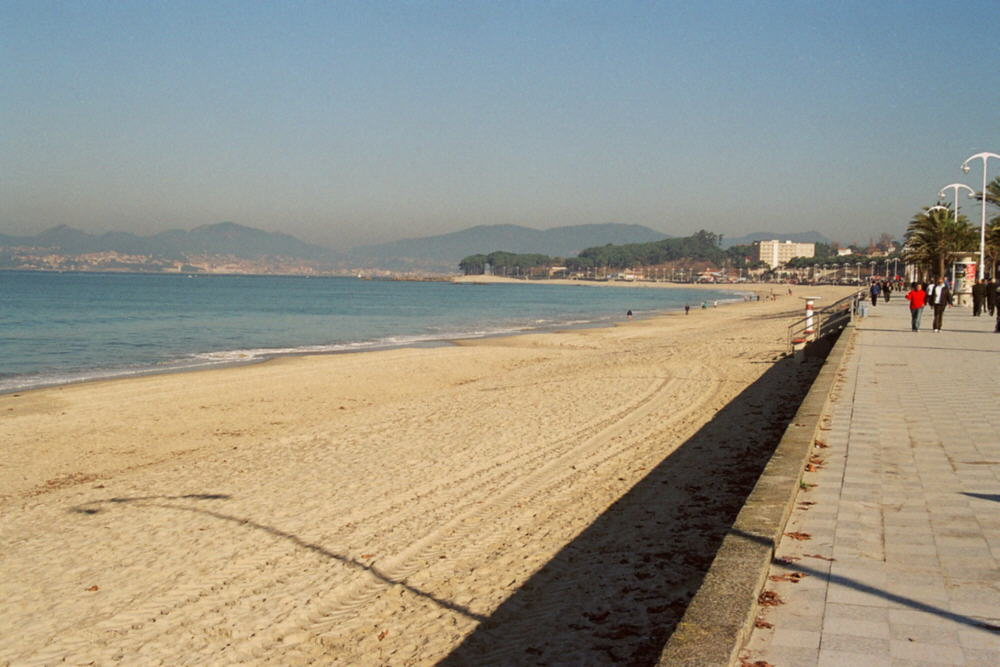
Praia de Samil

Samil Beach (Galician: Praia de Samil, Spanish: Playa de Samil) is a beach of Vigo in Galicia in north-west Spain.

It is the longest beach in the entire municipality. The beach has three swimming pools, a water slide, basketball courts, a skating rink, spacious green areas, picnic areas, and playgrounds.
