= Madras Municipal Airport =

Madras Municipal Airport Madras Army Airfield
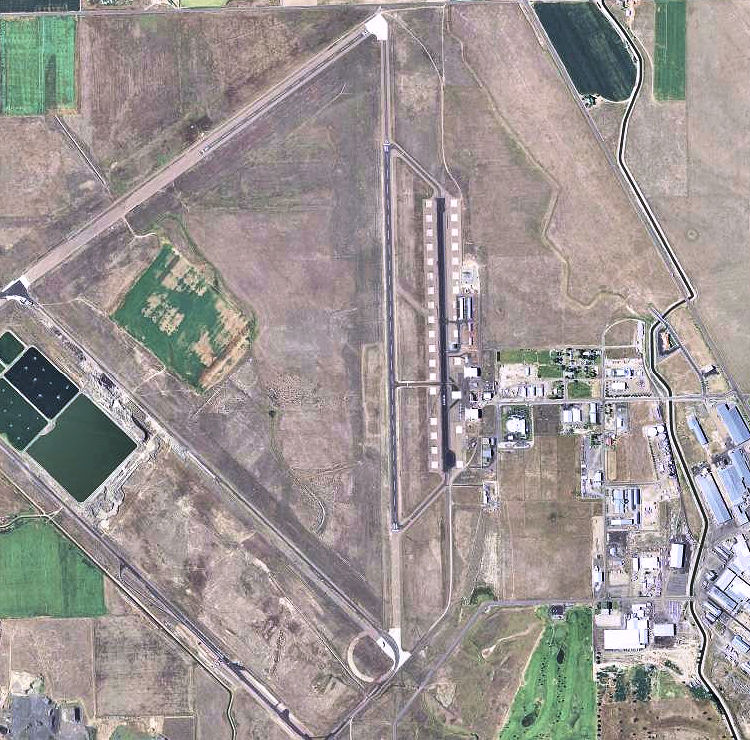
- 2006 USGS Orthophoto
- IATA: MDJ; ICAO: none; FAA LID: S33

Summary
- Airport type: Public
- Owner: City of Madras
- Serves: Madras, Oregon
- Location: Jefferson County, near Madras, Oregon
- Elevation AMSL: 2,437 ft / 743 m
- Coordinates: 44°40′13″N 121°09′18″W

Map
- Location of Madras Municipal Airport

Runways
Direction	Length		Surface
Direction	ft	m	Surface
16/34	5,091	1,552	Asphalt
4/22	2,701	823	Asphalt

Statistics (2019)
- Aircraft operations (year ending 8/27/2019): 10,735
- Based aircraft: 54
- Source: Federal Aviation Administration

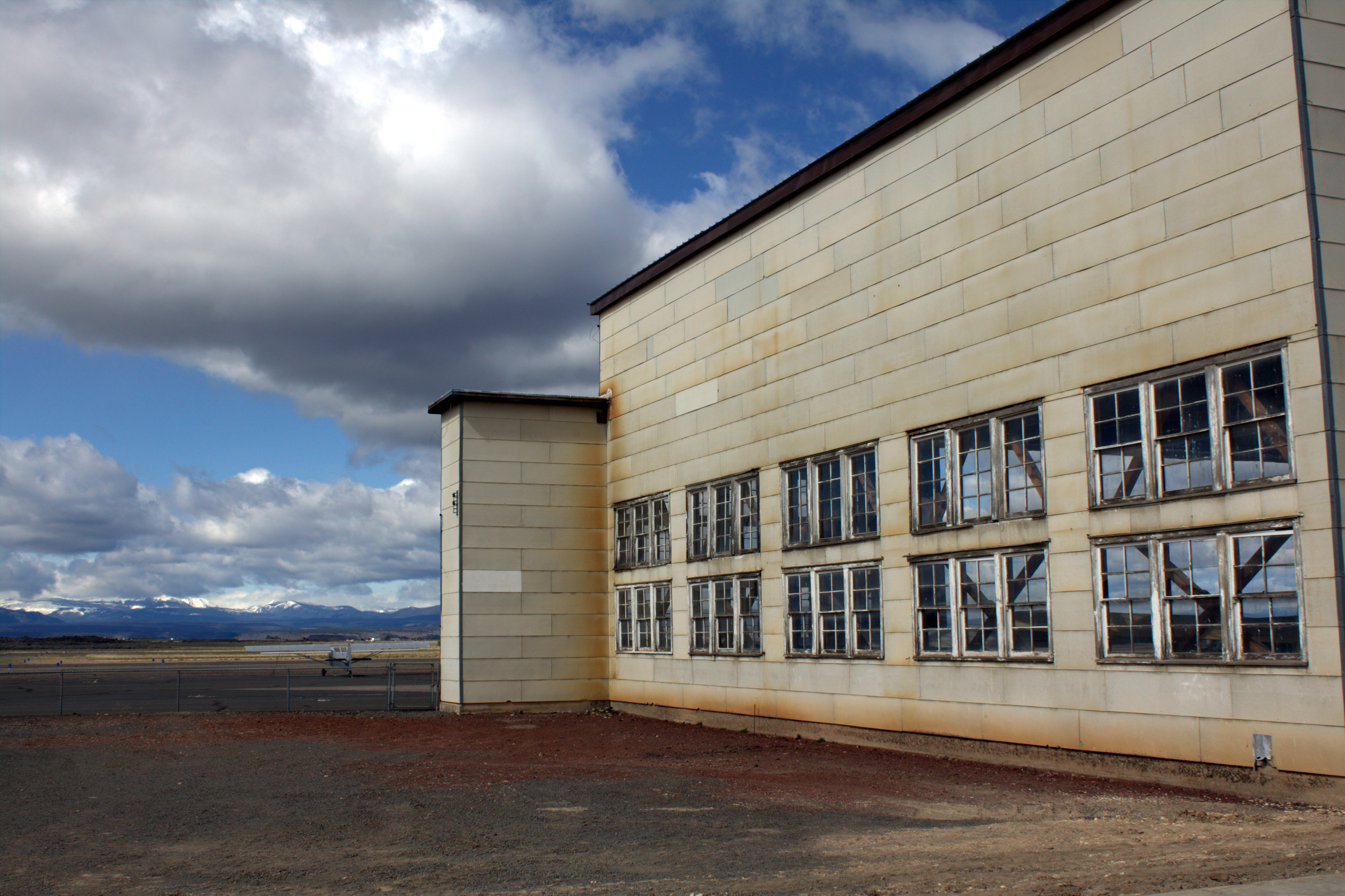
Old hangar, plane, and mountains

Madras Municipal Airport (IATA: MDJ, FAA LID: S33), formerly City-County Airport, is a public use airport located three nautical miles (6 km) northwest of the central business district of Madras, a city in Jefferson County, Oregon, United States. According to the FAA's National Plan of Integrated Airport Systems for 2009–2013, it is classified as a general aviation airport.

== History ==
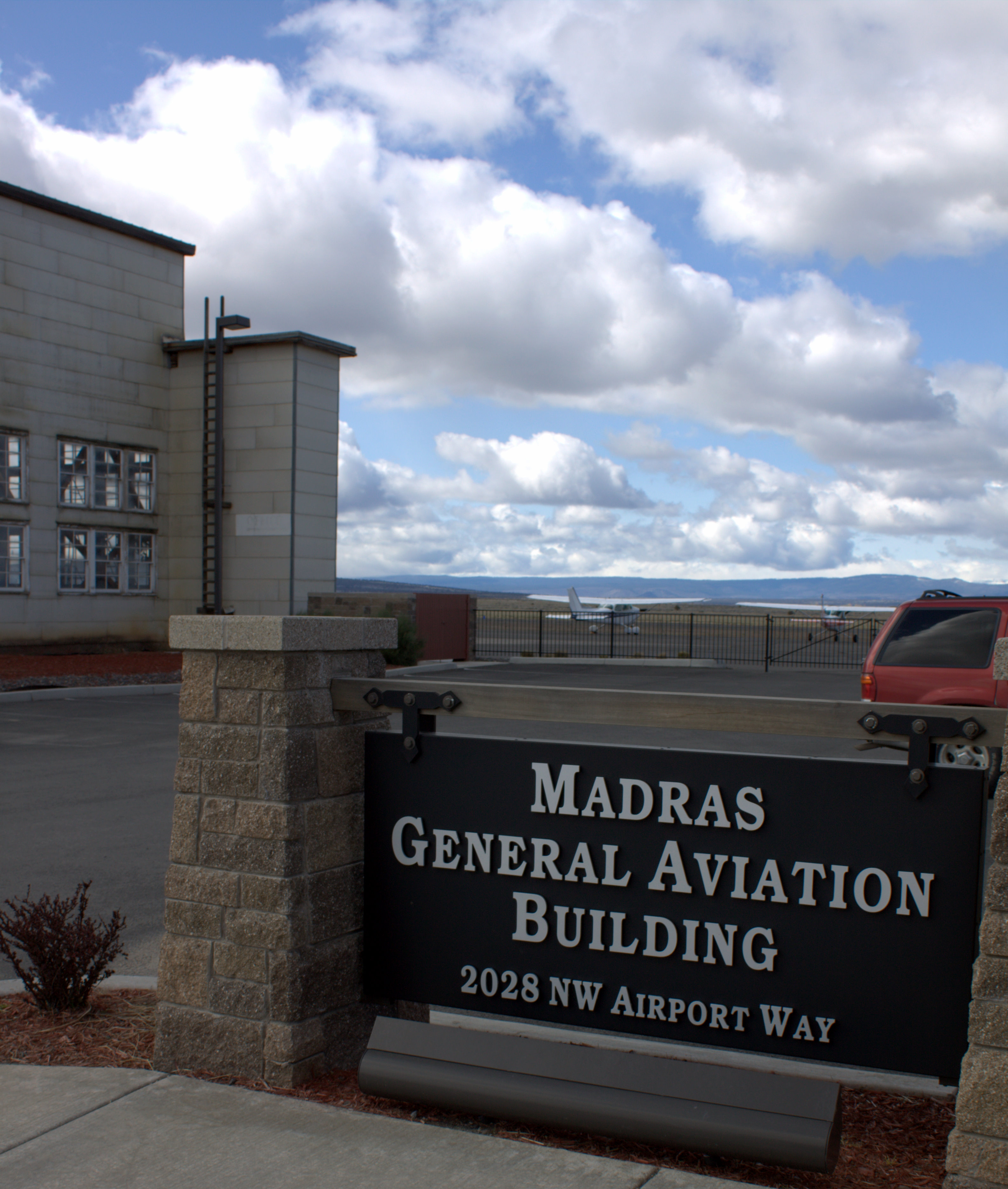
Airport entrance marker

Originally known as Madras Army Air Field, this was a World War II Army Air Corps training base for B-17 Flying Fortress and Bell P-63 Kingcobras. In 2000, the airport began hosting the annual Airshow of the Cascades. The Erickson Aircraft Collection moved from the Tillamook Air Museum to the Madras Airport in 2014. In mid-2015 the airport's north hangar, which was built during World War II, was added to the National Register of Historic Places.

== Facilities and aircraft ==
Madras Municipal Airport covers an area of 2,098 acres (849 ha) at an elevation of 2,437 feet (743 m) above mean sea level. It has two asphalt paved runways: 16/34 is 5,091 by 75 feet (1,552 x 23 m) and 4/22 is 2,701 by 50 feet (823 x 15 m).

For the 12-month period ending August 27, 2019, the airport had 10,735 aircraft operations, an average of 29 per day: 94% general aviation, 6% air taxi, and 1% military. At that time there were 54 aircraft based at this airport: 38 single-engine, 7 multi-engine, 8 jet, and 1 helicopter.

== See also ==
- Oregon World War II Army Airfields
