= Paul Bennet =

Australian aerobatic pilot

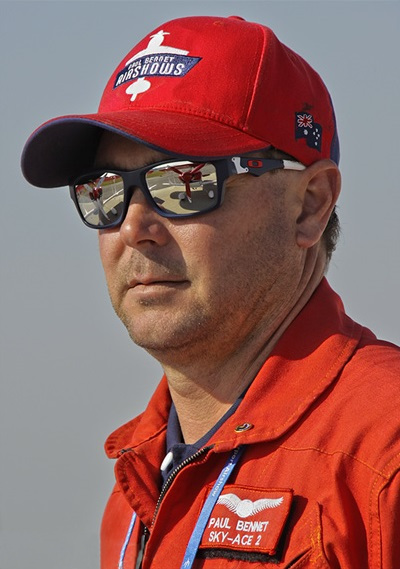
- Born: 16 November 1973 (age 52)
- Occupation: Australian acrobatic pilot

Paul Bennet (born 16 November 1973 in Taree, Australia) is an Australian aerobatic pilot. He has placed first in the Australian Aerobatic Championships in both the Advanced and Unlimited categories.

Outside of competition aerobatics he is also a well known international airshow performer, flying a wide range of aircraft.

== Biography ==
Bennet grew up in Old Bar, near Taree, New South Wales, the only son of Janet and Robert. He went to school at Old Bar Primary School and Taree High School. After completing school, Paul was offered an apprenticeship as a shipwright at Seafari Shipwrights in Forster, New South Wales. He became the manager of Genkem fiberglass supplies, which changed its name to Trojan Fibreglass and Composite Supplies, the company he now manages.

In 2005, he founded Paul Bennet Airshows, a company offering air show management and air displays.

== Bennet's Aircraft ==
Bennet's Wolf Pitts Pro biplane was originally built for Wyche T. Coleman III by Steve Wolf of Wolf Aircraft. Its engine is claimed to produce more than 400 horsepower (300 kW). The Wolf Pitts Pro weighs 1,200 pounds (540 kg) and is equipped with a unique set of wings that give it a roll rate of 350 degrees per second. The tail of the plane is modelled on ones used on high-performance radio-controlled aircraft.

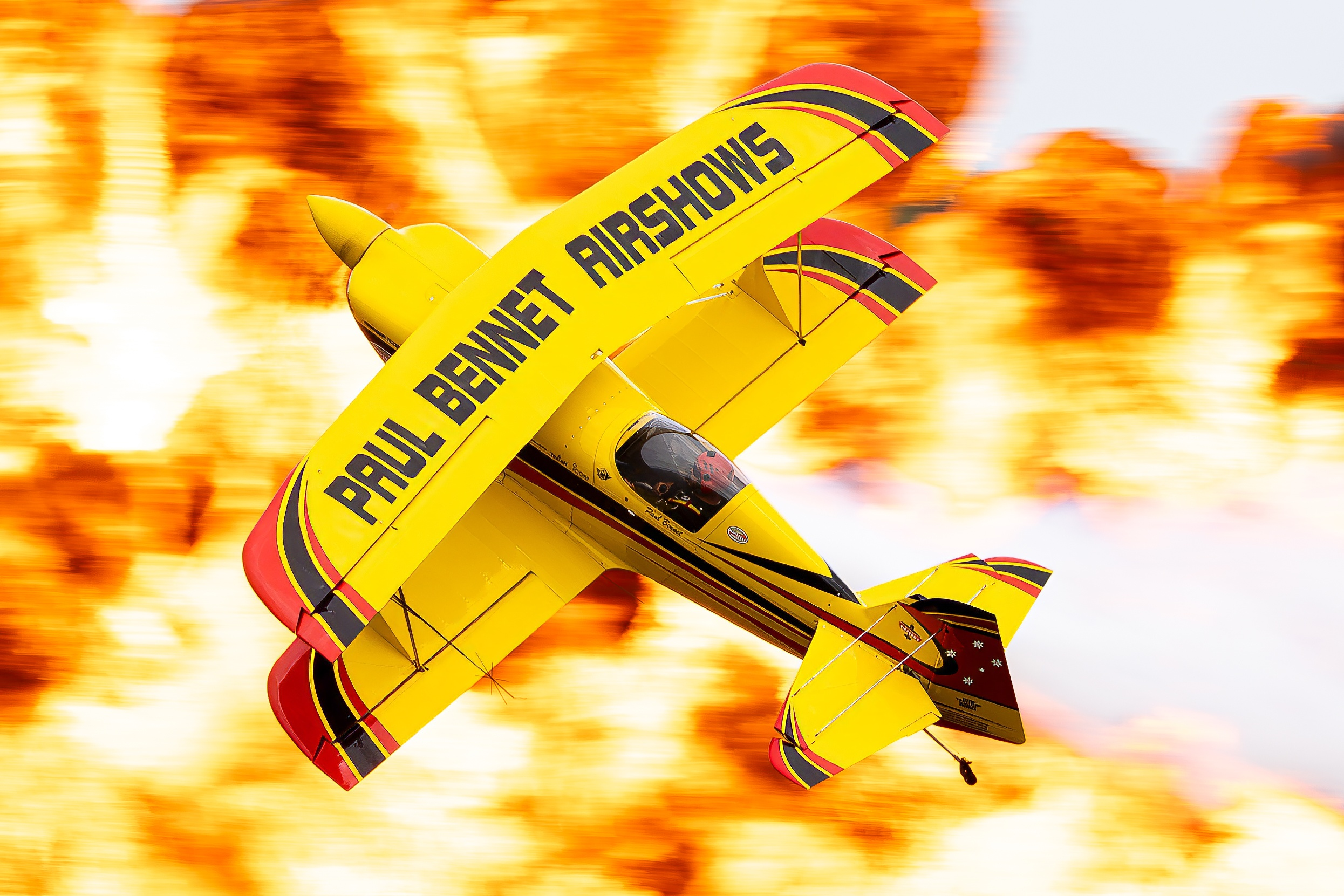
Bennet performing his signature 'Wall of Fire' maneuver at the Tyabb Airshow in March 2026

In addition to the Wolf Pitts Pro, Bennet owns and displays the following aircraft:

- Wolf Pitts S1-11X
- S1 Pitts Specials
- Grumman Avenger
- T28 Trojan
- CAC Wirraway
- Piper J-3 Cub
- Yak 52
- Cessna O2
- Pitts Model 12
- Zivko Edge 540
- Wolf Pitts 360
- Hawker Sea Fury
- Cessna 185 Skywagon
- de Havilland Vampire
- Vought F4U Corsair
