= Venice-Lido Airport =

General aviation airport serving Venice, Italy

Venice-Lido Airport Aeroporto di Venezia-Lido
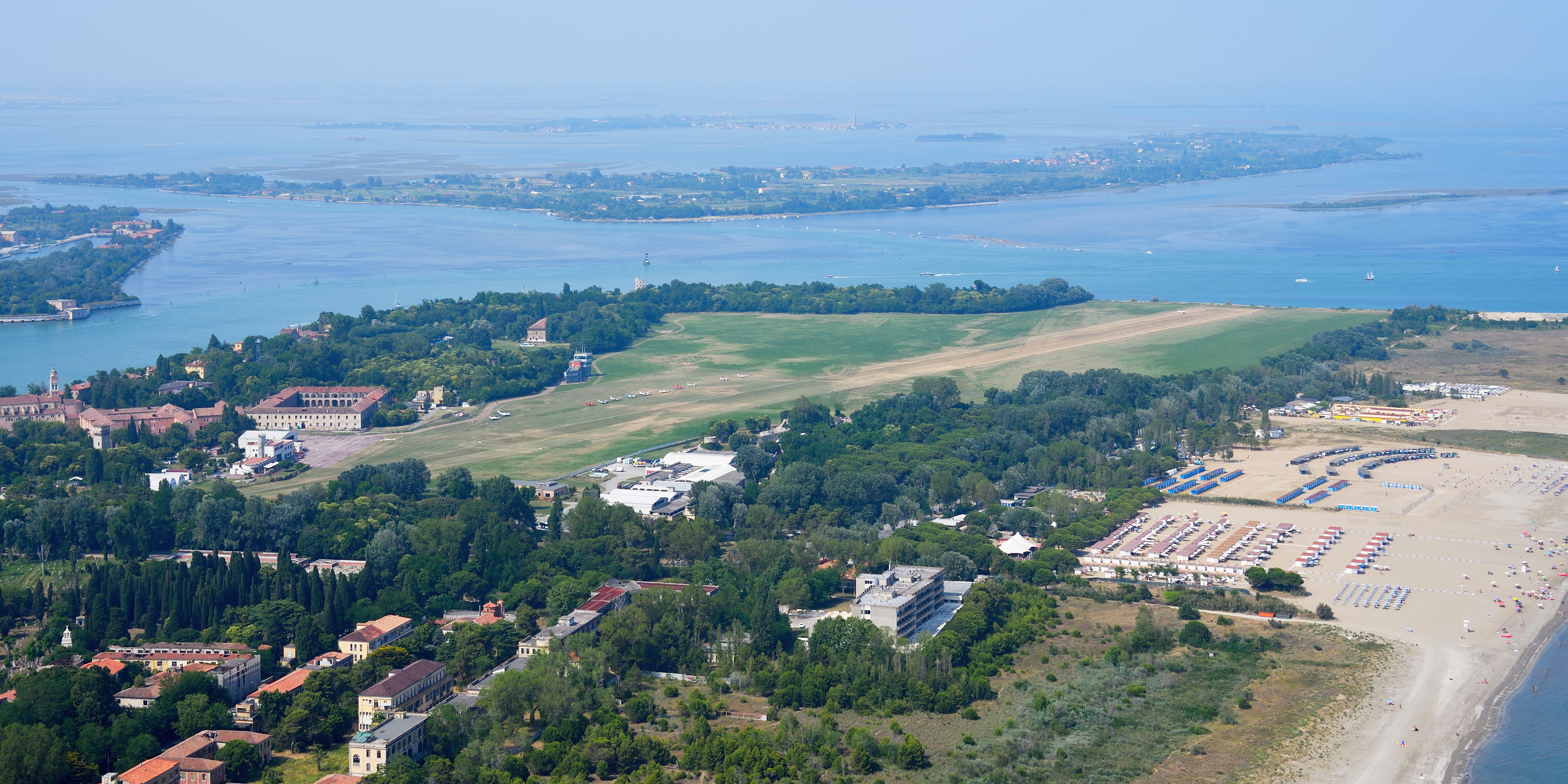
- IATA: none; ICAO: LIPV

Summary
- Airport type: Public
- Operator: Nicelli S.p.A.
- Serves: Venice (Venezia), Italy
- Location: Lido di Venezia
- Elevation AMSL: 13 ft / 4 m
- Coordinates: 45°25′44″N 12°23′16″E

Map
- Location of airport in Italy

Runways
Direction	Length		Surface
Direction	m	ft	Surface
05/23	994	3,261	Grass
- Source: AIP Italia

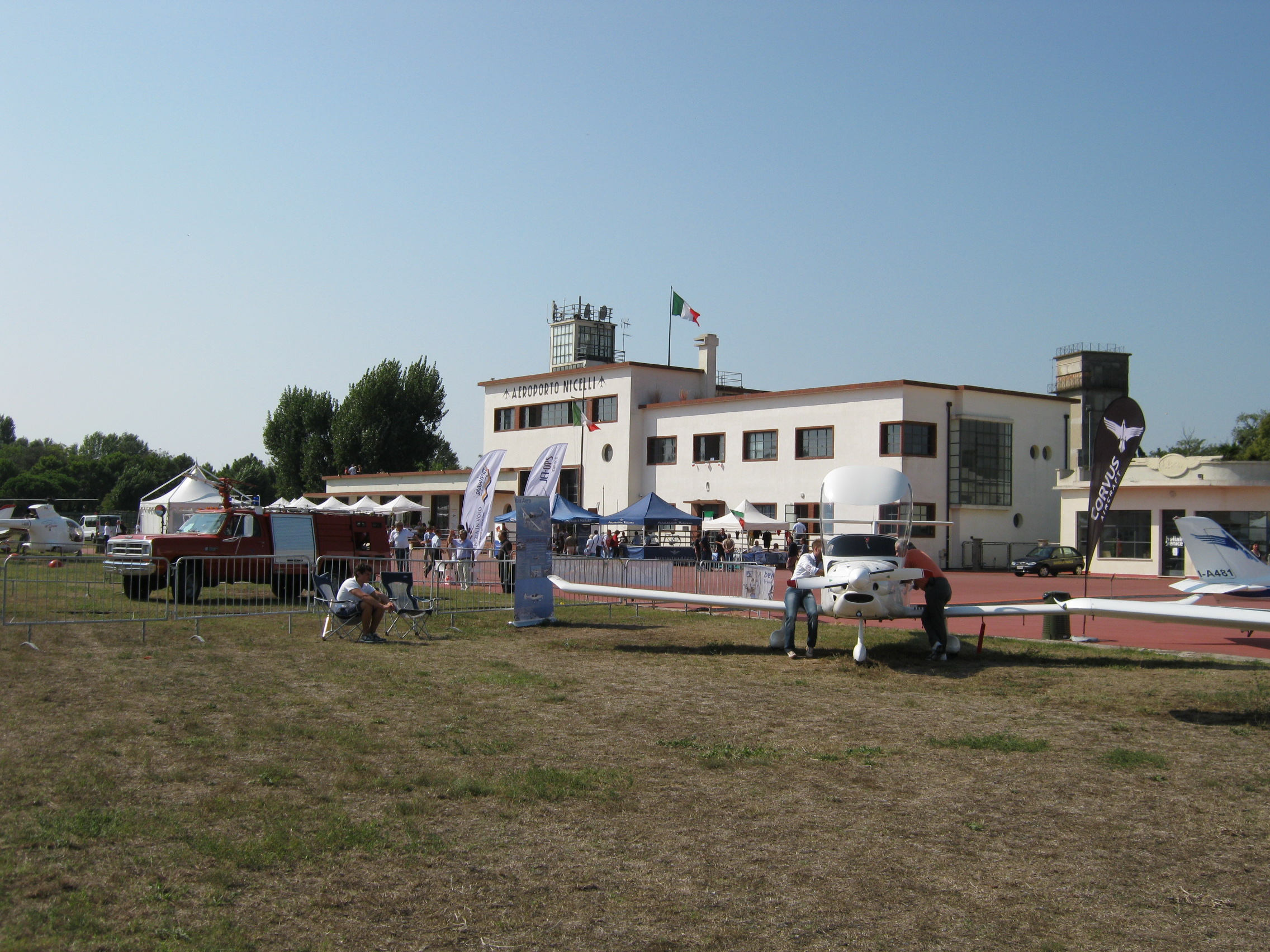
Aircraft at the Venice-Lido Airport

Venice-Lido Airport (Italian: Aeroporto di Venezia-Lido, ICAO: LIPV) is an aerodrome located 1.9 nautical miles (3.5 km; 2.2 mi) east of Venice (Venezia), a city in the Veneto region in Italy. It is situated on the north end of the island of Lido di Venezia. It is also known as Giovanni Nicelli Airport, after Sgt. Giovanni Nicelli (born 1893), an ace of the Italian Air Force, and was formerly known as Venice-San Nicolò Airport.

The aerodrome is operated by Nicelli S.p.A. and administered by the Italian Civil Aviation Authority (ENAC) of Venice. The air traffic service (ATS) authority is ENAV.

== Facilities ==
The airport resides at an elevation of 13 feet (4 m) above mean sea level. It has one runway designated 05/23 with a grass surface measuring 994 by 45 metres (3,261 ft × 148 ft).

== See also ==
- Venice-Tessera Airport (Marco Polo Airport)
