= Globemaster =

Globemaster may refer to:

== Aircraft ==
Globemaster is the name of three separate airlifters, produced by Douglas Aircraft Company or its successors:

Model/Introduced	Builder	Type	In service
Douglas C-74 Globemaster (1945)	Douglas Aircraft	strategic airlifter	1940s to 1970s
Douglas C-124 Globemaster II (1949)	Douglas Aircraft	heavy lift military cargo transport	1950 to 1974
Boeing C-17 Globemaster III (1991)	Designed by McDonnell Douglas, marketed by Boeing	strategic and tactical airlifter	1993-present

== Other uses ==
- Globemaster Air Cargo, a defunct Canadian Airline
- VR-56 "Globemasters", a U.S. Navy Reserve transport squadron in naval aviation

== See also ==
- Master (disambiguation)
- Globe (disambiguation)
