= FXE =

FXE may refer to:

- Ferromex, a Mexican railway company
- Fluorexetamine, a dissociative drug belonging to the arylcyclohexylamine class
- Fort Lauderdale Executive Airport, in Florida, United States
- Fortunair, a Canadian airline
