= Sonicblue =

Sonicblue may refer to:

- SONICblue Incorporated, a defunct American audio/video equipment manufacturer
- Sonicblue Airways, a defunct Canadian airline
