= List of airlines of New Brunswick =

This is a list of airlines of New Brunswick which have an air operator's certificate issued by Transport Canada, the country's civil aviation authority. These are airlines that are based in Nova Scotia.

== Current airlines ==
Airline	Image	IATA	ICAO	Callsign	Hub airport(s) or headquarters	Notes
Atlantic Charters					Grand Manan Airport	Also known as Manan Air Services

== Defunct airlines ==
Airline	Image	IATA	ICAO	Callsign	Hub airport(s) or headquarters	Notes
Eastern Canada Air Lines					Moncton	1936 - 1938
Maritime Central Airways					Moncton	1941 - 1963; Nordair was a subsidiary
