= List of defunct airlines of Canada =

This is a list of defunct airlines of Canada.

Airline	Image	IATA	ICAO	Callsign	Hub airport(s) or headquarters	Time activity Notes
30000 Island Air					Parry Sound Harbour	1994 – ???? Charter rental & leasing service Operated DHC-2 Beaver AOC suspended in 2002
A
Abbotsford Air Services			ABE	ABBY AIR	Abbotsford	???? – ???? Operated BN 2 Islander, Cessna Skylark
Adastra Aviation			ADD	ADASTRA	Abbotsford	Not to be confused with Adastra Aerial Surveys of Australia
Advance Air Charters			ADV	ADVANCE	Calgary	1993 – 1995; Operated Douglas DC-8
Aerial Recon Surveys					Whitecourt	1985 – 2006; Renamed Airborne Energy Solutions; Operated Cessna 177, Robinson R44
Aero Activities Limited					Barker Field; Maple Airport	1949 – 1957; Belongings to Marion Alice Orr; Sold in 1957
Aero Bee Airlines					Montréal Trudeau	2012 – 2012; Founded by Russ Payson; Operated Boeing 737 800
Aéro Golfe						1988 – 2000; Renamed Air Saguenay; Operated DHC-2 Beaver
Aero Link					Toronto Pearson	1997 – 2000; Operated Embraer EMB 120 Brasilia, Piper Twin Comanche
AeroTaxi			QAT	AIR QUASAR	Québec City	1990 – 1992
Aero Trades Western		VM	ATW	AERO TRADES	Winnipeg Richardson	1979 – 1984; Acquired by Soundair; Operated DC-4, Convair 580, Fokker F-27
Aerokon Aviation					Whitehorse	1984 – 2004; Operated DHC-3 Otter
Aeropro			APO	AEROPRO	Québec City	1998 – 2010; Still operates as maintenance facility in Quebec City
Air 500			BRM	BOOMERANG	Toronto Pearson	1988 – 2007
Air 2000 Canada		2T	CMM		Toronto Pearson	1988 – 1988; Renamed Canada 3000
Air Alliance		3J	AAQ	LIAISON	Québec City	1988 – 1999 to Air Nova
Air Alliance						2002 – 2006
Air Alma		QB	AAJ	AIR ALMA	Alma	1980 – 2002; Operated Embraer Bandeirante, Piper Navajo; Established as Alma Air Services
Air Amos					Amos	1964 – 1964
Air Atlantic		9A	ATL	DASH	Saint John	1985 – 1998; Feeder airline for Canadian Pacific Airlines and later Canadian Airlines International
Air Atonabee		OU	OUL	CITY EXPRESS	Peterborough	1980 – 1984; Renamed City Express; Operated Saunders ST-27,
Air Baffin			BFF	AIR BAFFIN	Iqaluit	1990 – 1997; Renamed Air Nunavut
Air BC		ZX	ABL	AIRCOACH	Vancouver	1980 – 1987; To Air Canada Connector
Air Bras D'Or			BRL	BRASD'OR		1986 – 1987; Operated Twin Otter
Air Brazeau					Rouyn-Noranda	1973 – 1978; Established as Northwestern Airways. Renamed Quebec Aviation
Air Caledonia			ACM	WEST CAL	Vancouver	1984 – 1989; Operated PBY Catalina
Air Canada Connector		AC			Halifax	2001 – 2002, Merged with Air Canada Regional under the new name Air Canada Jazz
Air Canada Jazz		QK	JZA	JAZZ	Halifax	2001 – 2011; Renamed Air Canada Express
Air Canada Cargo Express						1978-1990s, later reincarnated as Air Canada Cargo operated Douglas DC 8
Air Canada Regional		QK	ARN		Halifax	2001 – 2002, Merged with Air Canada Connector under the new name Air Canada Jazz
Air Canada Tango		AC	ACA		Montréal Trudeau	2001 – 2004; Low-cost subsidiary branch of Air Canada
Air Caravane		EN	ACR	CARAVANE	Montréal Trudeau	1973 – 1981; Renamed/merged to: Air Cardinal; Operated C-47, DC-3, Vickers Viscount
Air Cardinal					Montréal Trudeau	1981 – 1987; Established as Air Caravane; Operated Vickers Viscount
Air Caribou					Fermont	???? – 1984; Acquired and merged into Air Saguenay; Operated DHC-3 Otter
Air Charter Systems		CS	CSW	CHARTER SYSTEMS	Montréal-Mirabel	1986 – 1988; Rebirth in 1997 as International Cargo Charter and operating until 2003
Air Club International		HB	CLI	AIR CLUB	Montréal-Mirabel	1993 – 1998; Charter airline to Europe
Air Columbus Vacations						2002 – 2003; Operated Boeing 727
Air Commonwealth Alberta					Edmonton	1969 – 1979; Operated DC-3
Air Dogrib					Yellowknife Water Aerodrome	1978 – 1982; Operated Floatplane
Air Dorval			ADT	AIR DORVAL	Dorval	???? – ????
Air Fecteau		JG	AFH	FECTO	Senneterre	1936 – 1967; Merged with La Sarre Air Services to form Propair
Air Gaspé		QJ			Sept-Îles	1951 – 1986; Established in 1951 as Trans-Gaspesian Air Lines. Became a subsidiary of Quebecair in 1973
Air Georgian		ZX	GGN	GEORGIAN	Toronto Pearson	1994 – 2020; Assets sold to Pivot Airlines; Regional, charters, cargo Subsidiary of Air Canada Express
Air Integra			AII	INTEGRA	Halifax	1987 – 1993; Operated Cessna 414
Air Labrador		WJ	LAL	LAB AIR	Goose Bay	1948 – 2017; Regional, charters. Merged with Innu Mikun Airlines to form Air Borealis
Air Liaison		Q9	LIZ	LIAISON	Baie-Comeau	2001 – 2012; To Skyjet MG
Air Link Express			FSR			1979 – 1999
Air Madeleine			MLN	AIR MADELEINE	Rimouski	1982 – 1996
Air Manan						1994 – 2005
Air Manitoba		7N	NAM	MANITOBA	Winnipeg Lyncrest	1990 – 1994; Established as Northland Air Manitoba; Operated C-46, DC-3, HS 748, Dash 8
Air Maritime						1982 – 1984; Subsidiary of Eastern Provincial Airways. To Canadian Airlines; Operated Hawker Siddeley 748
Air Melançon					Sainte-Anne-du-Lac Water Aerodrome	1957 – 2017; Operated DHC-2 Beaver seaplane Acquired by Air Tarmac
Air Mikisew		V8		AURORA	Fort McMurray	1961 (as Contact Air) – 2011; Grounded in 2010 and permanently closed by 2011
Air Montréal		F8	AMO	AIR MONTREAL	Montréal Trudeau	1994 – 2000; Activities taken over by GoAir CityLink; Operated Cessna Citation II, Embraer Brasilia, Fairchild Metroliner
Air Muskoka			AMS	AIR MUSKOKA	Muskoka	1975 – 2004
Air Niagara		NX			St. Catharines Niagara	1986 – 1994; Operated Convair 580, Fokker F28
Air Niagara Express		DB	DBD	AIR NIAGARA	St. Catharines Niagara	1978 – 1998; Operated Cessna 550 Citation, Convair 340, Convair 440, Convair 580, Fokker F28
Air Nord-Ouest					Québec City	1970 – 2005; Operated Cessna 185
Air Norterra		3F	ANX	NORTERRA	Yellowknife	1998 – Renamed Canadian North
Air Nova		QK	ARN	NOVA	Halifax	1986 – 2001; Merged into Air Canada Connector
Air Ontario					London	1961 – 1987; Merged into Air Canada Connector
Air Ontario		GX	ONT	ONTARIO	London	1987 – 2001; To Air Canada Jazz as Air Canada Connector
Air Ottawa					Ottawa	1990 – 1998; Operated Piper Seneca, Piper Chieftain
Air Park Aviation			APA	CAN-AM		1981 – 1982; Exploration charter work Operated DHC-3 Otter
Air Quebec Metro						1990-1990, Owned by Air Alma
Air Saguenay					Chutes-des-Passes, Lac Sébastien	1960 – 2019; Regional, charters, floatplanes
Air Sandy			SNY	AIR SANDY	1990s – ? Operated Piper Navajo	
Air Sask		7W	ASK	AIR SASK	Saskatoon	1991 – 2000; Established as La Ronge Aviation in 1958. Merged with Athabaska Airways to form Transwest Air
Air Satellite		6O	ASJ	SATELLITE	Baie-Comeau	1968 – 2008; To Exact Air
Air Schefferville		9V	ASF	SCHEFF	Schefferville	1981 – 2004; Operated DHC-6 Twin Otter, Beech 99
Air Southwest			ASW	AIR SOUTHWEST	Chilliwack	1983 – 2005
Air Toronto		CS	CNE	CONNECTOR	Toronto Pearson	1984 – 1992; Established as Commuter Express; To Air Canada Connector; Operated Jetstream 31
Air Wemindji			W9M			1987 – 2003
Air West					Nanaimo Harbour	1970s Operated DHC-2 Beaver
Air West			AWT	AIR WEST		1982 – 2005
Air Windsor					Windsor	1970 – 1979; Established as Gordon Airways in 1963
Airco Charters					Edmonton City Centre	1987 – 2012; Operated Piper Navajo
AirGava			AGV	AIR GAVA	Schefferville	1973 – 1981; Operated DHC-6 Twin Otter, C-47
Airspeed Aviation		5S	SPD	SPEEDLINE	Abbotsford	1986 – 2009; Acquired by Orca Airways
Airtransit					Victoria STOLport; Ottawa Rockcliffe	1973 – 1975; A wholly owned subsidiary of Air Canada
Airwave Transport			AWV		Toronto Pearson	1989 – 2001
Airwest Airlines		ZX		Vancouver		1964 – 1980; To Air Canada Regional; Operated DHC-3 Otter, DHC-6 Twin Otter
Aklavik Flying Services					Aklavik	1947 – 1976; Acquired by Kenn Borek Air; Operated Aeronca Champion, Piper Super Cruiser, Waco Standard
Alberta Citylink			ABK	ALBERTA CITYLINK	Medicine Hat	1996 – 2004; Owned by Bar XH Air
Alberta Express						1986 – 1986; Renamed Alta Flights
Alberta Northern Airlines					Calgary	1981 – 1989
Alert Bay Air Services		BF				1958 – 1978; Renamed Gulf Air Aviation
Algoma Airways			AGG	ALGOMA	Sault Ste. Marie	1970s – 1990s Operated Piper Super Cub, King Air 200
All West Freight						1996 – 2012
AllCanada Express			CNX	CANEX	Toronto Pearson	1992 – 2005
Alma Air Services					Alma	1960 – 1980; Established as Metrolitan Air Services in 1959; Renamed Air Alma
Alpenglow Aviation					Golden	1999 – 2010; Scenic tours and charter flights Operated DHC-2 Beaver, Cessna 185, Cessna 206
Alta Flights		AL	ALZ		Edmonton	1986 – 2014; Established as Alberta Express; To Sunwest Aviation
Amigo Airways					Vancouver	1999 – 2006; Acquired by Seair Seaplanes
Amos Air Service					Amos	1934 – 1940; Operated Curtiss Robin C-1
Angus Aviation			AZZ	ANGUS		1970s – 1990s Operated King Air A100
Antarctic Airways						1987 – 1988; Operated one DC-4, two DHC-6 Twin Otter; Flights to and onward Antarctica
Arctic Air					Fort Simpson	1964 – 1974; Renamed Simpson Air; Operated DC-3, Beech King Air
Arctic Sunwest Charters			ASC	ARCTIC SUNWEST	Yellowknife	1989 – 2013; Acquired by the Ledcor Group of Companies and re-branded as Summit Air
Arctic Wings					Churchill	1953 – 1956; Merged with Central Northern Airways to form Transair
Arrow Airways					The Pas	1935 – 1942; Founded by Jack Hone; To form Canadian Pacific Air Lines; Operated Fokker Universal
Ashuanipi Aviation					Wabush	1975 – 2006; Merged to Air Saguenay; Operated DHC-2 Beaver floatplane
Associated Air Lines					Vancouver	1952 – 1953
Associated Air Taxi						1956 – 1953; Founded by Robert B. Gayer; Amalgamated with Port Alberni Airways in 1948; Acquired by Central British Columbia Airlines
Associated Airways						1955 – 1955; Acquired by Pacific Western Airlines; Operated Avro York, Lockheed 14 Super Electra
Associated Helicopters					Vancouver	1961 – 1979; Subsidiary of Associated Airways; Acquired by Okanagan Helicopters; Operated Bell 47
Astoria Airlines		S3	AOI	ASTORIA	Montréal Trudeau	1995 – 1995; Operated Boeing 737-200; Very short-lived airline operating in the summer of 1995
Athabaska Airways		9T	ABS			1955 – 2000; Founded by Floyd Glass; Merged with Air Sask to form Transwest Air
Atlantair			ATB	STARLITE		1981 – 1981
Atlantic Central Airlines		CN				1960 – 1979; Operated C-49 Skytrain
Atlantic Island Airways		UZ	AIW	TARTAN	Summerside	1994 – 1995; Operated Fokker F28
Atlas Aviation						1947 – 1972; Renamed Kenting Aviation; Operated DHC-6 Twin Otter
Atonabee Airways						1971 – 1979; Renamed Air Atonabee
Austin Airways			AAW	AUSTIN	Timmins	1934 – 1987; To Air Ontario
Aviation Boreal						1989 – 2004; Operated DC-3, Piper Navajo
Aviation Business Flights					Vancouver	1985 – 1994; Renamed WestEx
Aviation Quebec Labrador		QC	QLA	QUEBEC LABRADOR	Sept-Îles	1983 – 2003; Operated Embraer Bandeirante
Avionair			ANU	AVIONAIR		1981 – 1999; Operated Piper Navajo Chieftain; Renamed Starlink Aviation
Awood Air		8D	AWO	AWOOD AIR	Victoria	1962 – 2000; Operated HS 748, Beech King Air
B
B C Yukon Air Service					Watson Lake	1953 – 1979; Established as Northern British Columbia Air Service; Operated DHC-6 Twin Otter, DHC-3 Otter, BN Islander
B.C. Air Lines					Vancouver	1943 – 1969; Established as Westinghouse Airways; Renamed PWA; Operated Grumman Mallard, DHC-2 Beaver, Luscombe 8, Republic Seabee
B.C. Airways						1928 – 1933; Operated Ford Trimotor
B.N.P. Airways					Vancouver	1958 – 1964; Operated Grumman Goose
Bar XH Air			BXH	PALLISER	Medicine Hat	1974 – 2012; Merged to Integra Air
Baxter Aviation		6B			Nanaimo Harbour	1985 – 2007; Acquired by West Coast Air
Baie Comeau Air Services					Matane	1955 – 1973; Renamed Golfe Air Quebec; Operated Beech 18, DC-3, BN Islander, Trislander
Bay Chaleur Air		VY			Bathurst	2002 – 2002; Operated Beech 1900D
BCWest Air					Abbotsford	2007 – 2008; Closed in October 2008 due to unresolved shareholder dispute
Bearskin Lake Air Service		JV	BLS	BEARSKIN	Sioux Lookout	1963 – 1977; Renamed Bearskin Airlines; Operated DC-3, Beech 99, Piper Navajo
Beaver Air Services					The Pas	1982 – 2006; Renamed Missinippi Airways; Operated Cessna Caravan
Bella Coola Air					Bella Coola	1996 – 2017; Charter operations
Big River Air						1984 – 2007; Renamed Air Roberval.
Big Salmon Air						1988 – 2006
BMR Aviation					Langley	1980 – 2005; Operated DC-7
Boreal Airways						1947 – 1957; Merged with Mont Laurier Aviation to form Nordair
Bow Helicopters					Calgary	1971 – 1979; Established as Bullock Helicopters; Acquired by Okanagan Helicopters; Operated Bell Helicopters, Aérospatiale Alouettes
Bradley Air Services		7F	FAB	FIRST AIR	Carp	1946 – 1996; Renamed/merged to First Air
Bradley Air Services			BAR	BRADLEY		2004 – 2006
British Columbia Air Lines					Vancouver	1943 – 1970; Operated Grumman Goose, Stinson 108, DHC-2 Beaver
British Columbia Airways					Vancouver	1927 – 1928; Operated Ford Trimotor which crashed on 25 August 1928
Brock Air Services			BRD	BROCK AIR	Kingston Rogers	1978 – ???? Charters and Medevac
Brooker-Wheaton Aviation			BWB	BROOKER-WHEATON	Edmonton	1970 – 1992; Renamed Morningstar Air Express
Buffalo Narrows Airways					Buffalo Narrows	1976 – 1977; Renamed Courtesy Air
Bullock Helicopters					Calgary	1964 – 1967; Founded by Bruce and Evan James Bullock; Operated Bell 47G, Bell 204; Rebranded to Bow Helicopters
Burrard Air		6E	BXA	BURRARD	Vancouver	1982 – 1986; Operated BN Islander, DHC-3 Otter
Business Flights		CZ	BFA	CHINOOKAIR		1978 – 2000; Established as Chinook Air
Bute Air					Vancouver	???? – ???? Operated BN Islander, Piper Cheyenne, Piper Navajo
Buzzard Air						1984 – 1990
C
Calumet Air Service					Saskatoon	1935 – 1980; Founded by Paul and Nick Jankovich; To Air BC; Operated Cessna 180, DHC-2 Beaver
Campbell Air						1981 – 1997
CanAC				CANAIR	Toronto Pearson	1989 – 1997
Canada Jetlines		AU	CJL	JETBUS	Toronto Pearson	2022 – 2024
Canada 3000		2T	CMM	ELITE	Toronto Pearson	1988 – 2001; Formerly Canada 2000; Canada 3000 Cargo sold to Cargojet and 2005 revival failed
Canada 3000 Cargo						2001 – 2004; Established as Royal Cargo Airlines; Renamed Cargojet Airways
Canada Trans-Continental Airways						1927 – 1928
Canada West Air			CWA	CANADA WEST	Vancouver	1986 – 1990
Canada West Airlines			CWA	CANADIAN WESTERN AIRLINES	Edmonton	2002 – 2004; Formed by ex-Canada 3000 staff, along with tour operator Canada West Holidays; Merged with Aero Falcon in 2004
Canadian Airlines		CP	CDN	CANADIAN	Calgary	1987 – 2001; To Air Canada
Canadian Airways					Winnipeg Richardson	1926 – 1941; Established as Western Canadian Airways; Acquired by Canadian Pacific Airlines
Canadian Colonial Airways					Montreal Saint-Hubert	1929 – 1942; Originally formed as a subsidiary of American based Colonial Airlines, known at the time as Canadian Colonial Airways. After becoming defunct they were later rebranded as a Canadian company, Colonial Airlines; Operated Fairchild FC-2
Canadian Metro Airlines					London	1938 – 1975; To Propair; Operated Dash 8
Canadian Pacific Air Lines		CP	CPC	EMPRESS	Vancouver	1942 – 1987; Known as CP Air, to Canadian Airlines International; The callsign is still used by Canadian North
Canadian Regional Airlines		KI	CDR	CANADIAN REGIONAL	Calgary	1993 – 2000; To Air Canada Connector
Canadian Transcontinental Airways					Montreal Saint-Hubert	1927 – 1938; Operated the first Post Office air mail delivery
Canadian Western Airlines		W2	CWA	CANADA WESTERN	Vancouver	2001 – 2004; Operated Swearingen Metroliner, Cessna 401
CanAir Cargo			CWW	CANAIR		1990 – 1997; Acquired by Royal Airlines; Operated Convair 580, Short 330
CanJet		C6	CJA	CANJET	Halifax	2002 – 2015
CanJet Airlines		C6	CJA	CANJET.COM	Halifax	1999 – 2001; Reorganized on 15 May 2001 as CanJet Airlines (2001) Ltd; Merged into Canada 3000 in August 2001.
Capital Air Surveys						1969 – 1983
Capreol and Austin Air Services					Toronto Bishop	1934 – 1934; Founded by Jack and Chuck Austin; Renamed Austin Airways
Cargaard Aviation					Ottawa	1988 – 2002; Established as Terra Surveys, rebranded Fugro Aviation Canada; Operated CASA C-212
Cargo North					Thunder Bay	2012 – 2015; Renamed North Star Air
Carl Millard					Toronto Pearson	1954 – 1962; Renamed Millardair
Carter Air Services						1962 – 1999
Cassidair Services						1956 – 1965; Renamed Pacific Coastal Airlines
Centennial Airlines			CNS	CENTENNIAL		2004 – 2004
Central Air Transport					Sioux Lookout	1978 – 1996; Renamed Gold Belt Air Transport; Operated DHC-3 Otter
Central Airways			CEN	CENTRAL AIRWAYS		1961 – 1961
Central British Columbia Airlines					Prince George	1946 – 1953; Renamed Pacific Western Airlines
Central Canada Air Lines					Kenora	1926 – 1926; Operated Curtiss HS
Central Northern Airways						1947 – 1956; Merged with Arctic Wings to form Transair
Chaparal Charters					Montréal Trudeau	1982 – 1984; Acquired by Air Inuit; Operated DHC-6 Twin Otter, DC-3
Cherry Red Airline					Prince Albert	1928 – 1932
Chilcotin Cariboo Aviation			DES	CHILCOTIN	Williams Lake	1977 – 1992; Operated BN Islander
Chimo Air Service					Red Lake	1994 – 2018; Operated Beech D18S, Cessna 180, DHC-3 Otter, DHC-3-T Turbo-Otter, Noorduyn Norseman
Chukuni Airways						Based out of Red Lake
Citizen Airways			VAX	VANTAGE		???? – ????
City Express		OU	OUL	CITY EXPRESS	Peterborough	1971 – 1991; Established as Air Atonabee in 1971
Coast Western Airlines						1988 – 2004
Coastal Cargo						1955 – 1959; Operated C-46
Colibri Aviation			CAE	HUMMINGBIRD		1970s – 1980s Operated Cessna Citation I
Collingwood Air			BLE	BLUEBIRD		1988 – 1996; Established as Collingwood Aviation Centre; Operated DHC-2 Beaver
Colonial Airlines					Montreal	1942 – 1956; Formed from Canadian Colonial Airways; Acquired by Eastern Air Lines
Commander Air Charter			CML	COMMANDAIR		???? – ???? Charter operator
Commando Air Transport					Red Lake	1996 – 2000; Operated C-46
Compagnie aérienne franco-canadienne						1926-1931
Confortair			CON	CONFORT	Sept-Îles	1987 – 2005; Operated Piper Navajo
Conifair Aviation		RO	ROY	CONIFAIR	Red Lake	1979 – 1992; Rename to Royal Airlines; Operated Douglas C-54
Connolly-Dawson Airways					Whitehorse	1957 – 1975; Merged with Yukon Flying Service and Range Airways to form Great Northern Airways; Operated DHC-2 Beaver, Douglas DC-3
Contact Airways					Fort McMurray	1961 – 1995; Renamed Air Mikisew
Corporate Express			CPB	PENTA	Calgary	1975 – 2009
Cougar Air			CAJ	COUGAR AIR		1978 – 1979
CoVal Air			CVL	COVAL	Campbell River	1982 – 1996; Operated BN Islander, DHC-3 Otter, Cessna 185 Skywagon
Cree Airways			CRE	CREE AIR	Edmonton	???? – ???? Operated Cessna 421
Crownair			CRW	REGAL		1989 – 1990; Operated Douglas DC-8
Curtiss-Reid Flying Service					Saint-Félicien	1928 – 1950; Founded by Wilfrid Thomas Reid; Operated Republic Seabee, Douglas C-54; 1950 C-54 crash
Cypress Airlines		R6	CYS	SKYBIRD	Vancouver	1987 – 1997; Operated Convair 340
Cypress Jetprop Charter					Vancouver	1996 – 1997; Operated Convair 440, Hawker Siddeley HS.125, Convair R4Y
D
Deraps Aviation						1988 – 2011; Merged into Air Saguenay; Operated DHC-2 Beaver, DHC-3 Otter
Direquair					Chibougamau	1975 – 1981; Operated DHC-2 Beaver, DHC-3 Otter
Discovery Air					Toronto Pearson	2006 – 2018; Founded by David Taylor
Dominion Aerial Exploration Company					Roberval Water Aerodrome	1922 – 1926; Founded by Harold S. Quigley; Operated Curtiss HS, N.T.2B; Reorganised into Canadian Airways Company
Dominion Pegasus Helicopters					King City	1973 – 1979; Merged into Okanagan Helicopters; Operated Robinson R22
Dorval Air Transport						1954 – 1958; Engaged on Canadian Dew Line operations Operated Curtiss C-46, Douglas C-47
Downair						1973 – 1973; Operated Lockheed L-1049
E
Eagle Aviation					Silver Falls Water Aerodrome	1986 – 1995; Operated Beech D18S, DHC-3 Otter
Earlton Airways					Earlton	1969 – 1998; Third-level carrier Operated Swearingen Merlin, Piper Navajo
Eastern Canada Air Lines					Moncton	1936 – 1938
Eastern Flying Service			SPR	SPEEDAIR		1956 – 1988; Acquired by Provincial Airlines
Eastern Provincial Airways		PV	EPA	PROVINCIAL	Gander	1949 – 1987; To Canadian Airlines International
Eldorado Aviation					Edmonton	1978 – 1985; Operated C-46, C-47, C-54, Boeing 737
Eldorado Radium Silver Express					Edmonton City Centre; Port Radium	1935 – 1947; To Eldorado Aviation
Enerjet		EG	ENJ	ENERJET AIR	Calgary	2009 – 2019; 2021 Rebranded as Lynx Air
Enterprise Air						1993 – 2005; Renamed Triumph Airways; Operated DC-3, Cessna 310, Piper Navajo
Expeditair						1988 – 1999; Acquired by Air Saguenay; Operated DHC-2 Beaver
Express Air			WEW		Saskatoon	2000 – 2020; Operated Beech 1900D
F
Fairchild Aerial Surveys						1922 – 1923; Founded by Sherman Fairchild; Operated Fokker D.VII
Fecteau Transport Aerien					Senneterre	1936 - 1973; Renamed Air Fecteau
First Air		7F	FAB	FIRST AIR	Ottawa; Yellowknife; Iqaluit	1973 - 2019; Merged into Canadian North 1 November 2019
First Nations Transportation					Gimli	2003 - 2009
Flair Air		F8	FLE		Edmonton	2005 – 2017; Acquired NewLeaf Airways and renamed Flair Airlines; Operated 727-200, 737-400
FlyToo					Calgary	2017 – Never started
Forest Industries Flying Tankers (FIFT)						1959 – 1962; Operated 4 Martin JRM Mars
Fortunair		FX	FXE	AIR FUTURE	Montreal, Toronto	1993 – 1995
Fugro Aviation Canada					Ottawa	2002 – 2012; Rebranded CGG Aviation Canada; Operated CASA C-212, Cessna 208
Futura Airlines			FUT	FUTURA		1975 – 1979; Operated Aero Commander 680, Douglas C-47
G
Gagnon Air Service						1969 – 1970; Merged with Saguenay Air Service to form Air Saguenay; Operated Cessna 180, DHC-2 Beaver
Gander Aviation			GAN	GANAIR	Gander	1960 – 1979; Founded by William Bennett; Operated Beech Queen Air, DHC-3 Otter
Garrison Aviation			AHM	AIR HURON		1976 – 1979
Gateway Aviation		WG			Edmonton City Centre	1952 – 1979; Operated DC-3, Convair 640, DHC Otter, Twin Otter, HS 748
Georgian Express						2004 – 2007; Acquired by Cargojet; Operated Cessna Caravan, Beech 1900
Geoterrex					Ottawa	1972 – 1988; Established as Terra Surveys, rebranded Cargaard Aviation; Operated PBY Catalina, DHC-3 Otter, CASA C-212, Cessna 404
Gilbert's Flying Service						1931 – 1932; Renamed West Coast Air Services
Gillies Flying Service					Buttonville	1948 – 1963; Renamed Toronto Airways
Ginger Coote Airways						1938 – 1942; Acquired by Canadian Pacific Air Lines; Operated Fairchild 51, Noorduyn Norseman
Globemaster Air Cargo		G5			Edmonton St. Albert	2003 – 2004
GoAir Citylink						1998 – 2011; Operated Embraer Brasilia
Gogal Air Services					Snow Lake Water Aerodrome	2004 – 2012; Operated Noorduyn Norseman
Gold Belt Air Transport			GBT	GOLDBELT	Pickle Lake Water Aerodrome	1988 – 1997; Operated BN Islander, DHC-3 Otter
Golden Voyagairs						1971 – 1973; Operated Douglas DC-6B; Travel club
Golfe Air Quebec		EM	GAQ	GOLFAIR		1973 – 1982; Established as Baie Comeau Air Services in 1955; Operated Beech 18, BN Islander, DC-3, Twin Otter
Gordon Airways						1961 – 1970; Renamed Air Windsor; Operated Cessna 150, Cessna 172, Piper Pacer, Piper Aztec
Grand Island Aviation						1986 – 2000; Acquired by Air Saguenay; Operated Cessna 185
Gray Rocks Air Service					Montreal Saint-Hubert	1921 – 1938; Founded by Tom Wheeler; Renamed Wheeler Airlines
Great Lakes Air Service						1961 – 1967; Established as Great Lakes Airlines; Renamed Air Ontario
Great Lakes Airlines					Sarnia Chris Hadfield	1967 – 1981; To Air Ontario
Great Northern Airways					Whitehorse	1965 – 1972; Formed by the merger of Connolly-Dawson Airways, Yukon Flying Service, Range Airways; Acquired by Trans North Air; Operated DC-3, Piper Aztec, Fairchild F-27
Great Western Airways						1928 – 1929; Founded by Emil Sick and Frederick McCall; Absorbed Purple Label Airlines; Operated Stinson Detroiter
Greater Toronto Airways					Toronto Bishop	2014 – 2018; Renamed FlyGTA Airlines
Green Airways					Red Lake	1950 – 2017; Founded by G.H. Green; Operated floatplane DHC-3 Otter, Noorduyn Norseman
Greyhound Air					Winnipeg Richardson	1996 - 1997; Rebranded to KF Cargo in 2015
Gulf Air Aviation						1978 – 1980; Established as Alert Bay Air Services; To Air BC
H
Haida Airlines					Vancouver	1980 – 1980; To Air BC
Hanna Air					Silva Bay	1997 – 1997; Founded by Mark Segar; Renamed Pacific Spirit Air
Harmony Airways		HQ	HMY	HARMONY	Vancouver	2002 - 2007
Harrison Airways			HAA	HARRISON	Vancouver	1960 – 1979; Operated Convair 440, C-47, DC-3, F-11 Husky, Vickers Viscount
Hawkair		BH	BHA	HAWKAIR	Terrace-Kitimat	1994 – 2016; Regional airline On November 18, 2016, declared bankruptcy and suspended operations
Helijet Airways					Vancouver	1986 – 2000; Renamed Helijet International
HMY Airways		HQ	HMY		Vancouver	2002 – 2004; Renamed Harmony Airways
Holidair			STP	STAMPEDE	Edmonton	1988 – 1990; Operated DC-8-50, Lockheed Tristar
Hollinger Ungava Transport					Dorval	1948 – 1954; Operated Douglas C-47A, Curtiss C-46, PBY Catalina, Gulfstream I, DHC-2 Beaver
Hooker Air Service		HS			Pickle Lake Water Aerodrome	1970 – 1979; Operated Beech D18S, Bellanca Aircruiser, DHC-2 Beaver, DHC-3 Otter
Horne Air					Hornepayne Water Aerodrome	1981 – 2013; Operated DHC-2 Beaver
Hudson Bay Air Transport					Flin Flon	1939 – 1982; Operated Grumman Mallard
I
ICC Air Cargo Canada			CIC	AIR TRADER	Montréal-Mirabel	1998 – 2002; Also listed as ICC International Cargo Charter
Ilford-Riverton Airways			RIP	ILFORD	Winnipeg Richardson	1953 – 1986; Established as Ilford Airways; Renamed Northland Air Manitoba in 1986 and Air Manitoba in 1991; Operated DC-3, C-46, HS 748
Innu Mikun Airlines					Goose Bay	1998 – 2017; Regional airline, charters Merged with Air Labrador in 2017 to form Air Borealis
Intair		ND	INT	INTAIR	Toronto Pearson	1989 – 1991; Established by City Express as a successor to Skycraft Air Transport
Integra Air			AAI		Lethbridge	1998 – 2018; Scheduled passenger service, charters
Inter City Airways					Oshawa	1986 – 1986; Operated HS 748
Inter-Canadien		ND	ICN	INTER-CANADIEN	Montréal Trudeau	1986 – 1999; To Canadian Airlines International
International Jet Air		E6			Calgary	1971 – 1977; Wholly owned Allarco subsidiary Operated Douglas C-47A, Lockheed L-188 Electra, Jet Commander
Interprovincial Airlines						1995 – 1998; Operated DHC-6 Twin Otter
Island Express Air			IAX	ABBY AIR	Abbotsford	2009-2020
Island Valley Airways					Langley	1998 – 1999; Founded by Brent Kerr; Operated DHC-6 Twin Otter
Island Westair						1998 – 2005
J
Jackson Air Services			JCK	JACKSON		???? –2007; Operated DHC-3 Otter, Piper Navajo Was sold to Wings Over Kississing
Jetall		8J	JTL	FIREFLY		1987 – 1996
Jetsgo		SG	JGO	JETSGO	Montréal Trudeau	2001 – 2005; Operated Fokker 100; Entered in bankruptcy protection
Johanneson Flying Services					Stevenson Aerodrome	1932 – 1951; Taken over by Parsons Airways; Operated de Havilland DH.60 Moth, Cessna Crane, Cessna 140, Noorduyn Norseman
Juan Air			WON	JUAN AIR	Victoria	1972 – 2007; Acquired by Pacific Sky Aviation; Operated Piper Navajo
K
Kamloops Air Service					Kamloops	early 1950s Acquired by Central British Columbia Airlines
Kasper Aviation					Thunder Bay	2015 – 2016; Charter carrier
KD Air		XC	KDC	KAY DEE	Qualicum Beach	1990 – 2019; Charter carrier Operated Piper Navajo
Keir Air Transport						1967 – 1969; Renamed Air Commonwealth Alberta; Operated Douglas C-47A
Kelner Airways			FKL	KELNER	Pickle Lake	1989 – 1993; Cargo and passengers carrier Renamed Wasaya Airways; Operated DHC-3 Otter, Hawker Siddeley HS 748
Kelowna Flightcraft Air Charter		KW	KFA	FLIGHTCRAFT	Kelowna	1974 – 2015; Rebranded to KF Cargo; Operated Convair 580
Kenting Atlas Aviation						1972 – 1975; Acquired by Kenn Borek Air; Operated Douglas C-47A, DHC-6 Twin Otter
Keystone Air Service		BZ	KEE	KEYSTONE	Winnipeg St. Andrews	1985 – 2015; Operating certificate suspended, closed and liquidated assets.
Keywinds Air					Little Grand Rapids	2001 – 2004; Operated DHC-2 Beaver
Klahanie Air					Fort Langley	1976 – 2006; Operated DHC-2 Beaver
Knee Lake Air Service					Knee Lake	1988 – 2005; Operated DHC-2 Beaver
Knighthawk Air Express		4I	KNX	KNIGHT FLIGHT	Calgary	1993 – 2005; Operated Dassault Falcon 20
Kootenay Airways					Cranbrook	1986 – 2003; Operated Cessna 180
Kootenay Direct Airlines					Nelson	2006 – 2009; Charters
L
La Loche Airways					La Loche	2005 – 2006; Operated Beech King Air, Piper PA-31
La Ronge Aviation					La Ronge	1960 – 1991; Renamed Air Sask; Operated DHC-6 Twin Otter, Cessna 180, Cessna 185
La Sarre Air Services					La Sarrre	1946 – 1961; Merged with Air Fecteau to form Propair; Operated DHC-4 Caribou
Labrador Air Safari						1974 – 2006; Acquired by Air Saguenay
Labrador Airways		WJ	LAL	LAB AIR	Goose Bay	1971 – 1989; Renamed Air Labrador
Lac Saint-Jean Aviation						1966 – 1972; Acquired by Okanagan Helicopters; Operated Alouette II
Lamb Air					The Pas	1934 – 1981; Operated C-46, DHC 3, DHC 2, DHC 6, Stinson SR-8, Beech 18, Cessnas, Fairchild F27, Noorduyn Norseman, BN2 islander, Bristol Freighter, DC 3, Piper Aztec, Aérospatiale Gazelle, Aérospatiale Alouette II, Bell Helicopter
Lariviere Air Services					Schefferville	1961 – 1973; Renamed AirGava; Operated DHC-2 Beaver
Latham Island Airways					Yellowknife Water Aerodrome	1988 – 1991; To Air Tindi
Laurentian Air Services					Schefferville	1936 – 1998; Operated DC-3, DHC-6 Twin Otter
Laurentide Air Services					Angliers	1922 – 1925; Operated Vickers Viking, Curtiss HS
Laval Aviation					Laval	1980 – 2010; Operated DHC-3
Leavens Bros Air Services					Barker Field	1935 – 1958; Renamed Leavens Bros in 1953
Lethbridge Air Services					Lethbridge	1966 – 1969; Founded by Stubb Ross; Renamed Time Air; Operated Piper Cub, Beech 18
Lethbridge Aircraft Company					Lethbridge	1920 – 1922; Founded by John Ender "Jock" Palmer; Operated Curtiss JN-4 Canuk
Lethbridge Commercial Airways					Lethbridge	1927 – 1928; Founded by John Ender "Jock" Palmer; Operated Standard J-1
Little Red Air Service			LRA	LITTLE RED	Fort Vermilion	1986 – 2006; Air ambulance service Acquired by Nor-Alta Aviation; Operated Cessna 206, Beech King Air, BN Islander
Lome Airways						1948 – 1959; Operated Avro 689 Tudor 5, DHC-2 Beaver
Lynx Air		Y9	DAT	DAUNTLESS	Calgary	Apr 2022 - Feb 2024 Successor to Enerjet. Filed for creditor protection
M
M&C Aviation					Prince Albert	1930 – 1947; To Norcanair (Saskatchewan Government Airways)
Mackenzie Air					Edmonton	1975 – 1979; Charter carrier Operated BN Islander
MacKenzie Air Services					Edmonton City Centre	1932 – 1942; To Canadian Pacific Airlines; Operated Bellanca Aircruiser
Maestro		5G	SSV	SKYTOUR	Québec City	2006 – 2007; Charter carrier Operated Boeing 757-200ER
Mandair					Kenora	1992 – 2004; Operated DHC-3 Otter
Maple Air Services			MAD	MAPLE AIR	Maple	? – 1987; Operated Piper Cherokee
Maritime Central Airways					Moncton	1941 – 1963; Nordair was a subsidiary Operated DC-4
Maritime Global Airways			MGM		Halifax	1996 – 1997; Operated Convair 580
Matane Air Services					Matane	1947 – 1965; Acquired by Quebecair; Operated Lockheed 10 Electra, DC-3
May Airlines						1919 – 1924
McMurray Air Service					Uranium City Water Aerodrome	1947 – 1969; Founded by Edgar Jones; Acquired by Gateway Aviation; Operated Stinson 108, Republic Seabee, Noorduyn Norseman, Cessna 180, DHC-2 Beaver, DHC-3 Otter, Beech 18
Metrolitan Air Services					Alma	1959 – 1960; Renamed Alma Air Services
Miksoo Aviation					Meadow Lake	1975 – 1979; Operated Beech 18
Millardair		MA	MAD	MILLARDAIR	Toronto Pearson	1962 – 1990; Operated C-47; Continued as aircraft maintenance and servicing firm Millard Air Incorporated (Millardair MRO) 1990-2012
Minerve Canada		MR	MRV	ALOUETTE	Montréal-Mirabel	1986 – 1989; Division of the French airline which merged into Air Outre-Mer and became AOM French Airlines; Operated Douglas DC-8, MD-80
Ministic Air			MNS	MINSTIC	Winnipeg Richardson	1981 – 2008; Operated Piper Navajo, Beech King Air, Beech 1900
Minto Airways					Edmonton	1982 – 1986; Operated DHC-3 Otter, Beech D18S
Miramichi Air Service			MIR	MIRAMICHI	Douglastown Airfield	1970 – 1975; Aerial spraying Operated Grumman TBF Avenger
Mober Aviation					Drummondville	1970 – 1984; Operated DHC Beaver, C-47
Mont Laurier Aviation					Roberval	1947 – 1957; Merged with Boreal Airways to form Nordair; Operated DC-3, DC-4
Montmagny Air Service					Montmagny	1952 – 1993; Founded by Marius Lachaine and acquired by Gilles Couillard in 1954. Sold to Gaston Gosselin in 1980. Operated Aeronca Sedan, Cessna 180
Montreal Air Services					Montreal	1955 – 1978; Operated PBY Catalina, C-46, DC-3, Super Constellation
Montreal & Dominion Skyways					Montreal	1935 – 1942; To form Canadian Pacific Air Lines
Morgan Air Services						1983 – 2010; Operated Cessna 172, Cessna 401
Myrand Aviation						1990s-2000s
N
NAC Air		C9	HMR	HAMMER	Thunder Bay	2000 – 2008; North American Charters was 100% First Nations owned
Nahanni Air Services			NAH	NAHANNI	Norman Wells	1970 – 1986; Renamed North-Wright Air in 1986 and North-Wright Airways in 1998
Nationair Canada		NX	NXA	NATION AIRWAYS	Montréal-Mirabel	1986 – 1993; Owned by Nolisair
National Aviation					Prince Albert	1989 – 2009; Established as PA Aviation; Operated Beech King Air, Cessna 172, Cessna 310, Piper Navajo, Piper Seneca
Nav Air Charter			FCV		Victoria	1979 – 2005; Operated Mitsubishi MU-2, Swearingen SA226-TC Metro II
New Air & Tours					Calgary	2006 – 2008; Rebranded as Enerjet before starting
Newfoundland Aero Sales and Services					St. John's	1948 – 1949; Acquired by Eastern Provincial Airways
Newfoundland Air Transport					Deer Lake	1961 – 1979; Renamed Newfoundland & Labrador Air Transport
Newfoundland Airways					Gander	1948 – 1983; To Air Labrador
NewLeaf		F8			Winnipeg	2016 – 2017; Acquired by Flair Air
NextJet Canada					Kitchener	2016 – 2016; Virtual carrier
Nipawin Air Services					Nipawin	1961 – 1979; Renamed Osprey Wings; Operated DHC-2 Beaver, DHC-3 Otter, DHC-6 Twin Otter
Norcanair					Prince Albert	1947 – 2005; Originally M&C Aviation then Time Air
Nordair		ND	NDR	NORDAIR	Montréal Trudeau, Montréal-Mirabel	1947 – 1987; Formed by the merger of Boreal Airways and Mont Laurier Aviation; Acquired by Canadian Pacific Airlines; Merged into Canadian Airlines and Inter-Canadien; Operated Lockheed L-1049H
Nordair Metro		3N				1985 – 1988; Mergend into Quebecair; Operated Convair 580
NorOntair		NR	NOA	NORONTAIR	Sault Ste. Marie	1971 – 1996; Airline operations of Ontario Northland Transportation Commission; Operated DHC-6 Twin Otter
North American Airlines			NTM	NORTHAM		1978 – 2004; Operated Swearingen Merlin, Beech King Air, Piper Navajo
North Canada Air					Prince Albert	1930 – 1965; See also M&C Aviation, Time Air
North Cariboo Flying Service			NCB	NORTH CARIBOU		1957 – 2007; Rebranded North Cariboo Air; Operated Aeronca Champion, Piper Navajo
North Pacific Seaplanes					Prince Rupert Water Aerodrome	1995 – 2013; Operated DHC-3 Otter
North Vancouver Air		VL	NRV	NORVAN	Vancouver	1994 – 2003; Acquired by Regency Express; Operated Aeronca Champion, Jetstream 31, Piper Navajo, Beech King Air
North-Wright Air					Norman Wells	1986 – 1998; Established as Nahanni Air Services; Renamed North-Wright Airways
Northern British Columbia Air Service					Watson Lake	1936 – 1953; Renamed BC Yukon Air Service
Northern Dene Airways		U7	NKA	NORCANAIR	Prince Albert	1992 – 2006; Operated DHC-2 Beaver, DHC-3 Otter, Beech King Air, Swearingen Metroliner
Northern Hawk Aviation					Vancouver	2003 – 2005; Operated Piper Navajo, Beech King Air
Northern Mountain Airlines						1959 – 1971; Merged with Thunderbird Airlines to form Northern Thunderbird Air; Operated DHC-2 Beaver, Beech 18, Grumman Goose
Northern Sky Aviation					High Level	1989 – 2000
Northern Wings (Les Ailes du Nord)		WS			Sept-Îles	1946 – 1981; To Quebecair; Operated Douglas DC-3, Fokker Friendship, Hawker Siddeley HS 748
Northland Airlines						1961 – 1986; Merged with Ilford Riverton Airways to form Northland Air Manitoba; Operated DHC-2 Beaver, Barkley-Grow T8P-1, Beech 18, Lockheed Lodestar
Northland Air Manitoba		7N	NAM	NORVAN	Vancouver	1986 – 1991; Formed by the merger of Northland Airlines and Ilford Riverton Airways; Rebranded Air Manitoba; Operated HS 748, DC-3
Northward Airlines		NN			Edmonton	1972 – 1980; Established as Northward Aviation in 1966. Operated Saunders ST-27, DHC-2 Beaver, DHC-6 Twin Otter
Northwest Territorial Airways (NWT Air)		NV	NWT	TERRITORIAL	Yellowknife	1962 – 1998; To First Air; Operated L-188 Electra
Northwinds Northern			NWN	NORTHWINDS		1988 – 1996; Operated BN Islander, Cessna 402, Piper Navajo, Piper Seneca
Notre-Dame Air Transport				GO PREMIUM		1958 – 1964; Operated Convair 340
Nunasi-Central Airlines			NUM	NUNASI	Kenora	1984 – 1987; Established as Ontario Central Airlines; Renamed Nunasi-Northland Airlines; Operated DC-3
O
Odyssey International		OL	ODY	ODYSSEY	Toronto Pearson	1988 – 1990; Name, aircraft and some employees were merged with Nationair, and operated as a separate division of Nolisair for a short period
OK Heli-Logging					Vancouver	1970 – 1979; Acquired by Okanagan Helicopters; Operated Bell 214
Okanagan Air Services					Kelowna	1947 – 1949; Renamed Okanagan Helicopters; Operated Bell 47
Omineca Air Services					Burns Lake	1956 – 1980; Founded by Bill Harrison; Became subsidiary of Air BC; Operated DHC-2 Beaver, DHC-3 Otter, Cessna 185
Ontario Central Airlines			NUN	NUNASI	Kenora	1947 – 1984; Renamed Nunasi-Central Airlines in 1984 then Nunasi-Northland Airlines in 1987
Ontario Express		9X	OEL	PARTNER	Toronto Pearson	1988 – 1998; To Air Canada Regional
Ontario Northern Airways					Jellicoe	1960 – 1979; Operated DHC-2 Beaver, DHC-3 Otter
Ontario Worldair					Toronto Pearson	1978 – 1981; Operated Boeing 707
Orca Airways		OR	ORK	ORCA	Vancouver	2005 – 2018; Scheduled passenger service, charters Operated Piper Navajo
Osnaburgh Airways					Pickle Lake Water Aerodrome	1986 – 2006; Operated DHC-2 Beaver, DHC-3 Otter
Otonabee Airways		OU	OUL		Peterborough	1971 – 1980; Founded by Joseph Csumrick; Renamed Air Atonabee; Operated Saunders ST-27
Owen Sound Air Services					Toronto Pearson	1973 – 1984; Acquired by Soundair; Operated DC-3
OWG		N5	NRL	NOLINOR	Montréal–Trudeau, Toronto Pearson	2020 – 2025 Virtual airline and division of Nolinor Aviation
P
Pacific Airways						1925 – 1928; Founded by D. R. MacLaren on 10 February 1925; Acquired by Western Canada Airways on 1 May 1928
Pacific Coastal Airlines		PG			Nanaimo	1960 – 1980; Operated BN Islander, DC-3
Pacific Spirit Air						1997 – 2001; Established as Hanna Air
Pacific Western Airlines		PA	PWA	PAC WEST	Vancouver	1946 – 1987; To Canadian Airlines; Operated DC-3
Pacific Wings Airlines						2004 – 2006; Acquired by West Coast Air; Operated DHC-2 Beaver
Parsons Air Services						1974 – 1989; Operated Beech D18S
Parsons Airways					Kenora	1952 – 1979; Acquired Johanneson Flying Services and renamed Kenora Air Service; Operated Cessna 170, Cessna 180
Parsons Airways Northern			FAP		Flin Flon	1955 – 1984; Operated U-1 Otter, DHC-3 Otter
Pat Bay Air					Victoria Water Aerodrome	2005 – 2015; Floatplane charters
Patricia Airways and Exploration					Sioux Lookout	1926 – 1928; Founded by H.A. Oaks, G.A. Thompson, S. Tomlinson; Renamed Patricia Airways
Peace Air					Sioux Lookout	1968 – 2007; Established as Peace River Air Services in 1962; Operated BN Islander, Jetstream 31
Pegasus Airlifts					Malton	1962 – 1973; Merged with Dominion Helicopters in 1973 to form Dominion Pegasus Helicopters; Operated Bell 47J, Bell 206
Pem-Air		PD	PEM	PEM-AIR	Pembroke	1970 – 2002
Peninsula Air Services					Hamilton	1965 – 1979
Peregrine Air Charter					Vancouver	1987 – 1998; Operated DHC-2 Beaver, Fokker F28
Plumridge Air						2006 – 2017; Operated seaplane DHC-2 Beaver
Points North Air Services					Points North	1988 – 2003; Operated DHC-3 Otter, C-47, Cessna 402, Cessna Caravan
Points of Call Canada		PM	PTS	POINTSCALL	Edmonton	1988 – 1990; Operated Douglas DC-8
Polaris Charter Company					Yellowknife	1946 – 1953; Founded by Maxwell W. Ward; Operated DH.83 Fox Moth; To Wardair
Port Alberni Airways					Yellowknife	1947 – 1948; Founded by Jack Moul and Slim Knights; Merged into Associated Air Taxi
Powell Air			PWL	POWELL AIR	Powell River	1975 – 1987; Merged with Air BC's Port Hardy operations to form Pacific Coastal Airlines; Operated Convair 440
Powell River Airways					Vancouver	1959 – 1965; Renamed Airwest Airlines; Operated DHC-6 Twin Otter
Prairie Airways					Moose Jaw	1935 – 1942; To form Canadian Pacific Air Lines; Operated de Havilland Puss Moth, Beechcraft S18D, Barkley-Grow T8P-1, Waco ZQC-6
Premair						1992 – 1992; Operated Piper Navajo
Prince Edward Air			CME	COMET	Charlottetown	1989 – 2010; Operational control was transferred to SkyLink Express; Operated Beech 99
Pronto Airways			WEW	PRONTO	Prince Albert	2006 – 2015; Scheduled passenger service Absorbed by West Wind Aviation
Prospecting Airways						1928 – 1929; Aerial prospecting
Provincial Airlines		PB	SPR	SPEEDAIR	St. John's	1980 – 2016; Rebranded as PAL Airlines
Provincial Express			PRV	PROVINCIAL	St. John's	1988 – 2005; Operated Cessna Caravan
Ptarmigan Airways		5P	PTA	PTARMIGAN	Yellowknife	1965 – 1995; Acquired by First Air; Operated DHC-6 Twin Otter
Purple Label Airlines						1928 – 1928; Absorbed by Great Western Airways; Operated Stinson Detroiter
Q
Quebec Airways						1935 – 1942; Operated Boeing 247, de Havilland Dragon, Fairchild 71; To form Canadian Pacific Air Lines
Quebec Aviation			QBC	QUEBEC AVIATION		1979 – 1987; Establish as Northwestern Airways, to Inter-Canadien
Quebecair		QB	QBA	QUEBECAIR	Montréal Trudeau	1946 – 1987; Established as Rimouski Airlines; Acquired by CP Air in 1986; Consolidated within Canadian Airlines in 1987
Quebecair Express		QO	QAE		Québec City	2003 – 2005
Queen Charlotte Airlines					Vancouver Water	1946 – 1955; Acquired by Pacific Western Airlines; Operated Supermarine Stranraer
QuikAir		Q9			Calgary	2001 – 2006
QuikAire Cargo					Toronto Buttonville	1994 – 1996; Founded by Dan Rocheleau; Rebranded SkyLink Express; Operated Cessna Caravan, Cessna Grand Caravan
R
Rainy Lake Airways					Fort Frances Water Aerodrome	1954 – 1979; Operated DHC-2 Beaver, DHC-3 Otter, Beech 18, Noorduyn Norseman
Ramsey Airways					Greater Sudbury	1992 – 1994; Founded by Robert Merrilees; Operated DHC-3 Otter, Cessna 180
Range Airways					Calgary	1964 – 1965; Merged with Connolly-Dawson Airways and Yukon Flying Service to form Great Northern Airways
Red Lake Airways					Kenora	1987 – 2007; Operated DHC-3 Otter, DHC-2 Beaver, Cessna Skywagon
Regency Express		VL	NVR			1994 – 2002; Acquired North Vancouver Air and formed Sonicblue Airways
Regionair			RGR	REGIONAIR		1981 – 1984; Merged into Quebecair; Operated HS 748
Regionair		RH	GIO			1992 – 2001
Regional 1 Airlines			TSH		Calgary	2004 – 2014; Established as Westpoint Airlines; Rebranded R1 Airlines
Reindeer Air Service					Inuvik	1960 – 1979; Founded by Frederick J. Carmichael; Operated Stinson Voyager, DC-3, C-46, Beech 18
Rigel Airways					Resolute Bay	1982 – 1994; Operated DHC-6 Twin Otter
Rimouski Airlines					Montréal Trudeau	1947 – 1953; Operated de Havilland Dragon Rapide, C-46, DC-3
Roots Air		6J	SSV	SKYTOUR	Toronto Pearson	2000 – 2001; Part of Roots Canada ceased operations when ownership was acquired by Air Canada
Ross Air Service					Sandy Bay	2001 – 2011; Operated Cessna Skywagon
Royal Aviation		QN	ROY	ROY	Montréal Trudeau	1991 – 2001; Acquired by Canada 3000
Royal Aviation Express			RXP	ROY EXPRESS		1997 – 2001; Operated Boeing 737
Royal Canadian Airlines						failed
Royal Cargo Airlines		QN	ROY		Montreal Dorval	1999 – 2001; Operated Boeing 727-100C, Boeing 737-200F; Renamed Canada 3000 Cargo
RoyalAir					Montreal Dorval	1968 – 1969; To Quebecair; Operated Boeing 727, Douglas C-47A, DHC-6 Twin Otter
S
Sabourin Lake Airways		9S		SABAIR		1959 – 1996; Operated Beech 99, DHC-6 Twin Otter
Samaritan Air Service			HLO	HALO	Buttonville	1989 – 1999; Operated Learjet 24, Learjet 25
Sapawe Air					Atikokan Water Aerodrome	2004 – 2006; Operated DHC-2 Beaver
Sarnia Airlines					Sarnia	1960 – 1960; Operated a single de Havilland Dove
Saskatchewan Government Airways					Prince Albert	1947 – 1965; To Norcanair
Sealand Helicopters			SEA	SEALAND	St. John's	1977 – 1987; Merged to form CHC Helicopter in 1987
Saguenay Air Service					Lac Sébastien Water Aerodrome	1960 – 1970; Merged with Gagnon Air Service to form Air Saguenay; Operated DHC-3 Otter
Sea Air Services						1983 – 2001; Operated DHC-2 Turbo Beaver
Selkirk Air					Selkirk Water Aerodrome	2004 – 2006; Operated DHC-2 Beaver, Beech 18, Noorduyn Norseman, Partenavia P.68 Observer
Sept-Iles Helicopter Services					Vancouver	? – 1979; Acquired by Okanagan Helicopters; Operated Bell JetRanger
Silver Pine Air Services					Pine Falls	1960 – 1986; Operated Beech 18, DHC-3 Otter
Skeena Air Transport					Prince Rupert	1950 – 1954; Acquired by Central British Columbia Airlines
Sky Freighters					Victoria	1995 – 1998; Operated Douglas DC-3
Sky Regional Airlines		KV	SKV	MAPLE	Toronto Pearson; Montréal–Trudeau	2010 – 2021; Aircraft transferred to Jazz. Operator of Air Canada Express
Skycraft Air Transport		9F	SKG	SKYCRAFT-CANADA	Oshawa	1977 – 1989; Rebirth in 1989 and operating until 1994.
Skylink Airlines						?-1989, owned by Aztec Aviation
SkyLink Express			SLQ	SKYLINK		1994-2025
Skyservice Airlines		5G	SSV	SKYTOUR	Toronto Pearson	1986 - 2010; Differs from existing Skyservice Business Aviation being the same owners
Skywalker Airlines					Toronto Bishop	1986 – 1988; Division of Inter-City Airways
Skyxpress			KLO	KLONDIKE	Calgary	2001 - 2008
Skyward Aviation		K9	SGK	SKYWARD	Thompson	1986 – 2005; Operated Embraer Bandeirante, Beech 1900
Slave Air					Slave Lake	1988 – 2006; Air Ambulance services To CanWest Air; Operated Beech B200 King Air, DHC-2 Beaver
Sonicblue Airways		VL			Vancouver	1982 – 2006; Ceased operations
Sontair			STI	SONTAIR	Chatham-Kent	1969 – 2006; Operated King Air 200, King Air, Cessna Caravan
Soundair			EJC	SOUNDAIR	Toronto Pearson	1973 – 1997; Acquired Aero Trades Western, Owen Sound Air Services. Operated DC-3, DC-4, Convair 580, Fokker F-27
Soundair Express					Toronto Pearson	1989 – 1990; Established as Soundair; Operated Convair 580
South Moresby Air Charters					Masset Water Aerodrome	1989 – 1990; Founded by Sheila and Marvin Boyd; Acquired by Inland Air Charters; Operated DHC-2 Beaver
South West Air			SWC	SAINT CLAIR		1999– 1999
Southern Air Transport						1939 – 1942; To form Canadian Pacific Air Lines
Southern Alberta Air Lines					Lethbridge	1927 – 1931; Founded by John Ender "Jock" Palmer; Operated de Havilland DH.60 Moth
Southern Alberta Airlines					Lethbridge	1924 – 1924; Founded by John Ender "Jock" Palmer; Operated Standard J-1
Southern Frontier Airlines					Calgary	1978 – 1978; To Time Air
Sowind Air			SOW	SOWIND	Little Grand Rapids	1991 – 2001; Operated Embraer Bandeirante, DHC-3 Otter
Spartan Air Services						1946 – 1972; Aerial survey Operated Avro Anson, Lockheed Ventura, P-38 Lightning, DC-3, Bell 47, Piasecki H-21
Sporthawk International					Toronto Pearson	1996– 2001
St. Andrews Airways		CW	SDA	SAINT ANDREWS	Winnipeg	1970 – 1979; Operated Found FBA-2, de Havilland Heron, Beech 18, DHC-3 Otter
St. Felicien Air Services					Toronto Bishop	1957 – 1979; Operated Found FBA-2, DC-3, DHC-2 Beaver, Noorduyn Norseman
Stage Air					Penticton	2001 – 2001; Operated Piper Navajo, Cessna Caravan
Stanair						1952 – 1969; Operated DHC-3 Otter, Fairchild F-27
Starratt Airways					Hudson	1932 – 1942; To Canadian Pacific Airlines
Steinwands Transport					Rae/Edzo	1977 – 1985; Operated DHC-2 Beaver
Sunwest Home Aviation			CNK	CHINOOK	Rae Edzo	1986 – 2006; Renamed Sunwest Aviation
Sunwest International Aviation Services					Toronto Pearson	1996– 2001; Operated Beech King Air, Learjet 55
Sunwing Airlines		WG	SWG	SUNWING	Toronto Pearson	2005 – 2025; Merged with WestJet
Superior Airways					Fort William	1940– 1979; Operated Douglas DC-3, Bellanca 31-40
Survair		SS			Ottawa	1971– 1978; Operated Douglas C-47A, DHC-6 Twin Otter
Sustut Air					Smithers	2006 – 2013; Operated Skyvan, Cessna 208
Swanberg Air					Grande Prairie	2000 - 2011; Ceased due to the death of the founder Sylvan Swanberg
Swiftair Cargo			SCL	SWIFTAIR	Abbotsford	1980 – 1982; Operated Douglas DC-8
Swoop		WO	WSW	SWOOP	Abbotsford, Hamilton (ON)	2018 – 2023; Re-integrated into WestJet
T
Tagish Air Services					Vancouver	1988 – 2004
Tal Air Charters		JEL	YYZ	JETEL	Toronto Pearson	1994 – 2003; Operated Fairchild SA227-AC Metro III
Tamalik Air					CFB Goose Bay	1994 – 2003; Associated to Air Labrador; Operated DHC-3-T Turbo-Otter, DHC-6 Twin Otter
Tempus Air		OB	TEM		Hamilton	1985 – 1988; Operated Convair 580
Terr Air					Ross River	1973 – 1979; Operated DHC-2 Beaver, F-11 Husky, Hughes 500
Terra Surveys					Ottawa Macdonald–Cartier	1966 – 1972; Reorganized in Geoterrex, acquired by Cargaard Aviation
The Sarcee Club					Calgary	1971 – 1972; Operated a single Vickers 757 Viscount
Thomas Cook Airlines Canada		MT	TCX	KESTREL	Montreal, Quebec	2010 - 2013; Ended contract with Jazz
Thunderbird Airlines						1965 – 1971; Merged with Northern Mountain Airlines to form Northern Thunderbird Air; Operated DHC-3 Otter, DHC-2 Beaver, Cessnas
Timberline Air			TMR	TIMBER	Chilliwack	1998 – 1998; Operated Beech King Air
Time Air		KI	TAF	TIME AIR	Lethbridge	1966 - 1993; To Canadian Regional Airlines
Timmins Aviation					Montreal	1960 – 1962; Operated Beech 18, Beech Bonanza, Piaggio P.136 Royal Gull, de Havilland Dove
TK Air Charters					Prince Rupert	1995 – 2003; Operated Piper Navajo, Cessna 150, Cessna 337
Torontair			TOR	TORONTAIR	Buttonville	1963 – 1979; Established as Gillies Flying Service; Renamed Torontair; Operated Beech King Air, Beech 99, DHC-6 Twin Otter
Toronto Helicopters					Toronto	? – 1979; Merged with Okanagan Helicopters and Sealand Helicopters to form Canadian Helicopters
Trans Canada Couriers					Montréal Trudeau	1960 – 1973; Acquired by Purolator Inc. and renamed Purolator Courier Corporation; Operated Boeing 727, DC-9
Trans Fair					Longue-Pointe-de-Mingan	1978 – 1998; Operated Douglas DC-3, Beech 18, Convair 240
Trans North Air					Whitehorse	1967 – 1979; Operated Douglas C-47D
Trans North Turbo Air					Whitehorse	1967 – 1979; Renamed Trans North Helicopters; Operated Cessna 402
Trans Provincial Air Carriers					Whitehorse	1960 – 1974; Renamed Trans Provincial Airlines (TPA)
Trans Provincial Airlines (TPA)		CD	TDY		Prince Rupert	1974 – 1993; Established as Trans Provincial Air Carriers; Acquired by Harbour Air Seaplanes
Trans-Canada Air Lines					Montréal Saint-Hubert	1937 – 1965; Now Air Canada; Operated Lockheed L-1049C
Trans-Gaspesian Air Lines					Sept-Îles	1951 – 1966; Operated L.10 Electra, Beech 18, G-44 Widgeon, DHC-2 Beaver, Piper Apache, Cessna 180
Trans-Labrador Airlines					Schefferville	1956 – 1963; Operated PBY Catalina, C-46, C-47
Trans-Mountain Air Service					Campbell River	1968 – 1973; Operated DHC-2 Beaver
Transair		TZ	TTZ		Winnipeg Richardson	1956 – 1979; Founded by the merger of Central Northern Airways and Arctic Wings; acquired by Pacific Western Airlines in 1979
Transport Aerien Sept-Iles					Longue-Pointe-de-Mingan	1972 – 1983; Renamed Trans Fair; Operated DC-3, DC-4, Convair 240
Transport des Monts Aviation					Sainte-Anne-des-Monts Aerodrome	1979 – 1988; Operated Douglas C-47
Transwest Air		9T	ABS	ATHABASKA	Prince Albert	2000– 2021
Trillium Air			XXX	N	Waterloo	1999 – 2002; Operated Jetstream 31
Trippier Air Service					Ear Falls Water Aerodrome	1984 – 2005; Operated DHC-2 Beaver
Trinity Helicopters					Yellowknife	???? – 2013; Acquired by the Ledcor Group and rebranded as Summit Helicopters
Triton Airlines			DRC	TRITON AIR	St. John's	1993 – 1994; Founded by Jason and Javis Roberts; Operated Boeing 737
Triumph Airways			TUI		Oshawa	2005 – 2011; Established as Enterprise Air in 1993; Operated Basler BT-67
Tyee Airways		6T	TYE	TYEE AIR	Sechelt	1961 – 1992; Operated BN Islander, DHC-2 Beaver, DHC-3 Otter
U
United Air Transport						1933 – 1939; Renamed Yukon Southern Air Transport; Operated Ford Trimotor
Universal Helicopters					St. John's	1963 – 2020
V
Vacationair		VN	VAC	VACATIONAIR	Toronto Pearson	1988 – 1990; Established as Gray Coach Lines
Val Air		VK			Montréal Trudeau	2003 – 2004
Venture Air					Thompson	1995 – 2004; Renamed Central Flyway Air
Vic Turner Ltd						1966 – 1971; Acquired by Kenn Borek Air; Operated DHC-6 Twin Otter
Victoria Flying Services					Victoria Water Aerodrome	1959 – 1970; Founded by William Sylvester; Acquired by Nils Christensen; Operated DHC-2 Beaver
Vision Airways Corporation		V6	VSN	VISION	Timmins	? – 1994
Vistajet		5V	VJT	VISTA	Ottawa, Toronto, Windsor	1997 – 1997
W
Wabusk Air		WU	WABUSK		Moosonee	1997 – 2019; Air operator's certificate cancelled by Transport Canada; Operated Beech 90, Beech King Air, Piper Navajo; As of March 2023 there are five aircraft still registered to 164061 BC Ltd.
Waglisla Air (Wagair)		3V	SEH	SEA HAWK	Vancouver	1982 – 1995; Went in receivership Operated Piper Navajo, Beech 99, FH-227
Wagner Aviation					Kingston Norman Rogers	1968 – 1974; Operated Beech 18, BN Islander, Cessna 150, Cessna Skyhawk, Cessna 402
Wardair		WD	WDA	WARDAIR	Edmonton	1952 – 1990; Established as Polaris Charter Company at Yellowknife in 1946; Acquired by Canadian Airlines
Waweig Air					Thunder Bay Water Aerodrome	2001 – 2006; Operated DHC-2 Beaver, DHC-3 Otter, DHC-3-T Turbo-Otter
West Coast Air		8O	YWZ	COAST AIR	Vancouver Harbour	1996 – 2015; Floatplanes, scheduled and charters service Acquired by Harbour Air Seaplanes in 2010
West Coast Air Services						1978 – 1980; Established as Gilbert's Flying Service in 1931; To Air BC; Operated DHC-6 Twin Otter
WestCan International Airlines					Edmonton	2007 – 2010; Operated Boeing 727-100C
West Wind Aviation	ATR ATR-42-300, West Wind Aviation AN1140961		WEW	WESTWIND	Saskatoon John G. Diefenbaker	1983 – 2021; Scheduled passenger service, charters, MEDIVAC (air ambulance).
Western Canada Airways					Lac du Bonnet	1926 – 1930; To Canadian Airways
Western Express Airlines			WES	WESTEX	Vancouver	1994 – 2006; Established as Aviation Business Flights; Operated Super King Air, Cessna Caravan, Fairchild F-27, IAI Westwind, Learjet 31A, Swearingen Merlin II
Western Straits Air					Campbell River Water Aerodrome	1986 – 1996; Acquired by CoVal Air; Operated DHC-2 Beaver, DHC-3 Otter, Cessna 185
Westinghouse Airways					Victoria	1945 – 1954; To B.C. Air Lines; Operated Republic Seabee, Luscombe 8
WestJet Link		8P	PCO	PASCO	Calgary	2018 – 2024; Merged back into WestJet Encore; Operated Saab 340
Westpoint Airlines			WTP	WESTPOINT	Calgary	2003 – 2004; Renamed Regional 1 Airlines; Operated Dash-8, DHC-6 Twin Otter
Wheeler Airlines (1938)					Montréal Saint-Hubert	1938 – 1960; Founded by Tom Wheeler; Established as Gray Rocks Air Service in 1921; Renamed Wheeler Airlines (1960); Heavy transport division to Nordair; Operated Beech 18, Boeing-Stearman 75, C-46, C-47, Cessna 180, Grumman Avenger, Westland Whirlwind
Wheeler Airlines (1960)					Montréal Saint-Hubert	1960 – 1967; Founded by Tom Wheeler; Established as Wheeler Airlines (1938) in 1921; Taken over by Nordair
Whitehorse Flying Services					Whitehorse	1949 – 1954; Bush plane service To Central British Columbia Airlines; Operated DHC-2 Beaver, Noorduyn Norseman
Whiteshell Air Service					Lac du Bonnet (North) Water Aerodrome	1968 – 2004; Operated DHC-3 Otter
Wild Country Airways					Red Lake Water Aerodrome	1996 – 2006; Operated DHC-3 Otter, Noorduyn Norseman
Wilderness Seaplanes					Bella Coola	1959 – 1998; Merged into Pacific Coastal Airlines; Operated Beech King Air, BN Islander, Piper Navajo
Windoak Air Service					Vancouver	1982 – 1993; Renamed Harbour Air; Operated DHC-6 Twin Otter, DHC-3 Otter, DHC-2 Beaver
Wings						1942 – 1942; To form Canadian Pacific Air Lines
Winnport		W8	WNT		Winnipeg Richardson	1998 – 2002; Winnipeg-based air cargo company flying to China; Renamed Cargojet Airways; Operated Boeing 727
World-Wide Airways					Montréal Trudeau	1947 – 1966; Founded by Donald McVicar; Operated C-46, C-47, C-54, L-1049
Worldways Canada		WG	WWC	WORLDWAYS CANADA	Toronto Pearson	1973 – 1991; Registered in Nova Scotia in 1985; Operated Douglas DC-8
Y
Yellow Bird Air					Vancouver	1968 – 1984; Acquired by Burrard Air; Operated Douglas DC-3
Yellowknife Airways					Vancouver	1949 – 1951; Founded by Maxwell William Ward and George Pigeon; Operated DHC-2 Beaver
Yukon Airways & Exploration Company					Dawson City	1927 – 1929
Yukon Southern Air Transport						1939 – 1942; Established as United Air Transport; Acquired by Canadian Pacific Air Lines; Operated Ford Trimotor
Z
Zip		3J	WZP	ZIPPER	Calgary	2002 – 2004; Operations return to regular Air Canada routes
Zoom Airlines		Z4	OOM	ZOOM	Ottawa	2002 – 2008; Named acquired for the new XPO Airlines in 2009

== See also ==
- List of airlines of Canada
- List of airports in Canada

== Bibliography ==
- Blatherwick, F.J. (1989). A history of airlines in Canada. Toronto (Ontario) 1989: The Unitrade Press.
