= Jock Palmer =

Canadian aviator and soldier (1896–1964)

- Born: John Ender Palmer; 28 January 1896; Cambridge, England
- Died: 19 November 1964 (aged 68); Calgary, Canada
- Occupations: Soldier, aviator

John Ender Palmer DCM (28 January 1896 – 19 November 1964) was a Canadian soldier of the First World War, awarded the Distinguished Conduct Medal, and a Canadian aviator.

== Early years ==
Palmer moved from England to Canada early in his life and resided near Lethbridge, Alberta, where he went by the name of Jock Waddell.

== War service ==
Palmer enlisted in the Canadian Expeditionary Force at Valcartier, Quebec in September 1914 at the age of 18. During his service in the Canadian Machine Gun Corps he rose to the rank of Sergeant. It was at this rank during action near Festubert, France he was awarded the Distinguished Conduct Medal. He was later promoted to the rank of Lieutenant in May 1916. He was then seconded for service in the Royal Air Force where he was later promoted to captain and was credited with nine aerial victories. After the war he transferred to the Royal Canadian Air Force in July 1919.

== Aviation career ==
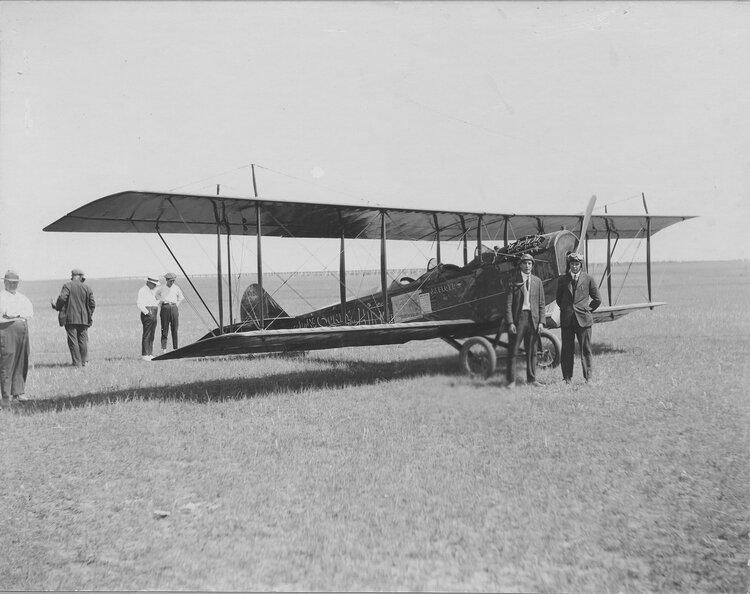
Jock Palmer (right) and co-pilot Harry Fitzsimmons (left) posed in front of their Curtiss JN-4 in 1920

After the war, Palmer and his business partner, Hugh Hervey Fitzsimmons, formed the Lethbridge Aircraft Company in 1920. Their first aircraft was a Curtiss JN-4 Canuck (registration C-CABX). Their Transport Canada License number was #35. Palmer obtained Commercial License #64 in September 1920. It was in this airplane that he completed the first Canadian international mail run from Lethbridge to Ottawa via Minto, North Dakota. The aircraft was later destroyed in a take off accident in 1922 which ended the Lethbridge Aircraft Company. Palmer and Fitzsimmons would later start Southern Alberta Airlines with the purchase of a Standard J-1 (registration C-GAEO). Later that year the company would close up when Palmer wrecked the J-1 returning from a sightseeing flight in the Waterton area. This ended Southern Alberta Airlines, but Palmer started over again, this time partnering with Charles B. Elliot to form Lethbridge Commercial Airways with another Standard J-1 (registration C-CAHU) in August 1927.

Around this time competing air businesses were starting up in Southern Alberta. Most notable of these was Purple Label Airlines, formed by Emil Sick; and Great Western Airways, formed by Frederick McCall, which would absorb Purple Label in 1928. GWA would start a route from Calgary to Lethbridge to Great Falls. Palmer would leave Lethbridge Commercial Airways to fly for Great Western Airways while Elliot reformed South Alberta Air Lines with the purchase of a de Havilland DH.60 Moth (registration CF-ADJ). South Alberta Air Lines would dissolve again in 1932.

John Ender "Jock" Palmer would end his flying career in 1955 after accumulating over 18,000 flying hours.

== Other ventures ==
In 1926, Palmer got a broadcast license for his radio station CJOC. Later he would sell the station to H.R. Carson.

== Death ==
Palmer died in Calgary on 19 November 1964 and is buried at Highwood Cemetery in High River, Calgary Region. He was invested as Member of Canada's Aviation Hall of Fame in 1988 at a ceremony held in Toronto, Ontario.

== Awards and honours ==
- Distinguished Conduct Medal, September 1915
- Air Force Cross, November 1918
- Canada's Aviation Hall of Fame, 1988
- Yukon Territory Order of Polaris

== See also ==
- History of aviation in Canada
- List of defunct airlines of Canada
- Canada's Aviation Hall of Fame
