= Winnport =

Canadian cargo airline

Winnport Air Cargo
- Founded: 1998
- Ceased operations: 2002
- Hubs: Winnipeg James Armstrong Richardson International Airport
- Headquarters: Winnipeg, Manitoba
- Key people: Lynn Bishop (CEO)

Winnport was the first Canadian all-cargo airline to operate scheduled service between Canada and the People's Republic of China. Franklin "Lynn" Bishop OM was the president of Winnport.

Winnport participated in the federal government Team Canada trade mission to China in 1998. At that time the airline was building an overnight cargo operation with Royal Air Cargo. At that time the airline held exclusive air cargo rights between Canada and Beijing, Shanghai, Shenzhen and Nanjing in China. In partnership with Kelowna Flightcraft Ltd. Winnport operated Boeing 747-200 cargo aircraft leased from Evergreen International Aviation The route operated was Winnipeg - Nanjing - Shenzhen - Winnipeg. Trucks connected the aircraft in Winnipeg to Chicago. Trucks in China connected the aircraft to Shanghai and Hong Kong.

Winnport was renamed as Cargojet Airways in 2002.

== See also ==
- List of defunct airlines of Canada
