= Air 500 =

Canadian airline

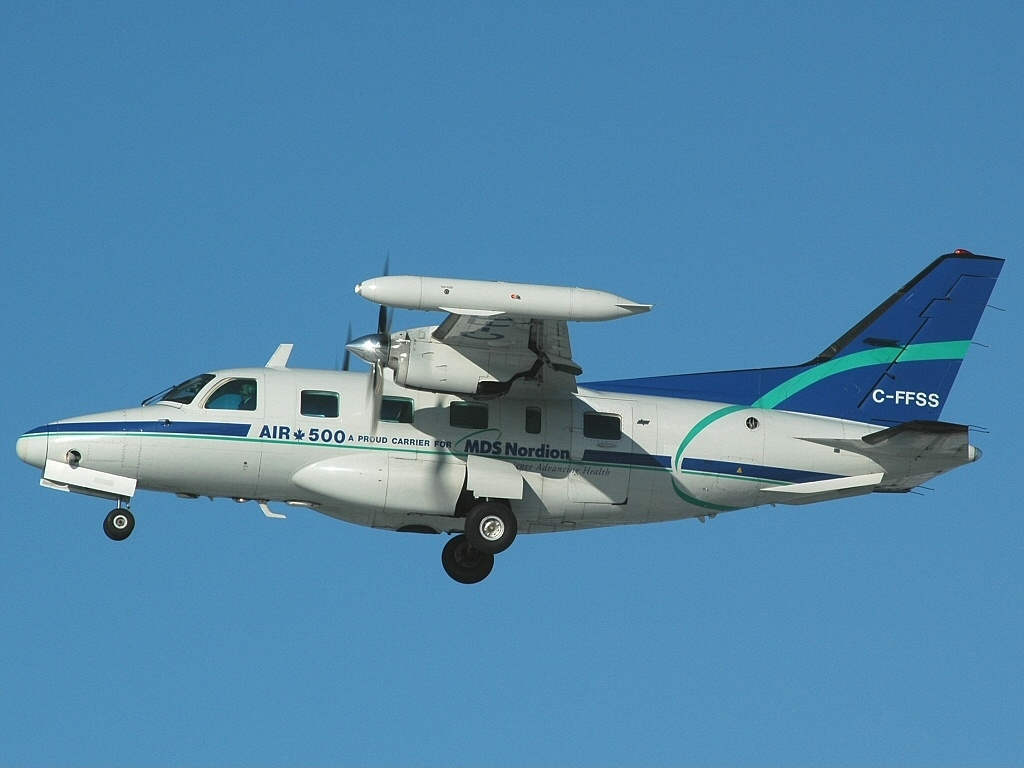
IATA	ICAO	Call sign
-	BRM	-
- Founded: 1985
- Ceased operations: 2007
- Operating bases: Toronto Pearson International Airport
- Founder: Dennis Chadala

Air 500 Limited was a Canadian airline.

== History ==
The airline was founded in 1985 by Dennis Chadala, a former captain, director of marketing, and assistant to Carl Millard, owner of the defunct airline Millardair. The company commenced operations with one Super Beech 18 Model E purchased from Bradley First Air.

Air 500 Limited was the first airline to receive a licensing and operating certificate at Toronto's Pearson International Airport following the deregulation of the aviation industry in Canada in 1985. The airline originally grew rapidly, adding an aircraft at a rate of one every six months. By 1989 it had acquired almost all of the business flying ad hoc charter out of Toronto for Chrysler, Ford, GM, and many others formerly serviced by Millardair. At the time, Air 500 was an exceptional success story, operating 3 Super Beech 18 aircraft, 2 Cessna 310s, 1 DC3, 1 Super DC (C117), 1 Piper Cheyenne, and 1 Mitsubishi Mitsubishi MU-2 Marquise.

In the early 1990s, Air 500's fleet continued to grow. adding 2 more Mitsubishi MU-2 aircraft, 2 Citation 500 business jets, and 1 Citation 2 business jet. In 1995, Pearson airport was privatized, and came under the direction and control of the GTAA (Greater Toronto Airport Authority). At the same time, Chadala acquired Hangar #7, the newest hangar facility at Pearson Airport, with 40 years remaining on its then-current land lease.

Air 500 had contracts in the courier industry, Air Ambulance, Services, and Aircraft Management, as well as a base of operations at the Esso Avitat in Ottawa, where 2 Mitsubishi Marquise MU2 aircraft were stationed. One was operating an exclusive long-term contract for Nordion (formerly Atomic Energy of Canada) flying radioactive isotopes to numerous destinations in the United States for medical purposes, while the other was a designated charter aircraft. Hangar #7 was large enough to lease out half the facility to Air 500 Limited and the other half to Execaire/Innotech Aviation; they remained tenants of the hangar until November 1998.

After their tenancy, Execaire/Innotech struck a deal with Chadala to purchase the hangar, all his aircraft, and Air 500 Limited itself. Air 500 was melded into Execaire, and became part of that operating group, taking advantage of the synergies available to it.

== See also ==
- List of defunct airlines of Canada
