= Skyxpress Airline =

Canadian charter airline

IATA	ICAO	Call sign
-	KLO	KLONDIKE
- Founded: 2001
- Ceased operations: November 2008
- Fleet size: 2
- Parent company: Flight-Ops International Inc
- Headquarters: Calgary, Alberta, Canada
- Website: http://www.skyxpress.ca

SkyXpress Airline was a Canadian air charter airline operator based in Calgary, Alberta. They catered to business and vacation travellers and would fly anywhere in North America. Its full name was Flight-Ops International, Inc. Skyxpress ceased operations in November 2008 due to the 2008 financial crisis.

== Fleet ==
As of August 2006 the Skyxpress Airline fleet was consist in:

- 2 BAe Jetstream 31
- Cessna 414 II

== See also ==
- List of defunct airlines of Canada
