= Air Mikisew =

Canadian regional airline

IATA	ICAO	Call sign
V8	N/A	AURORA
- Founded: 1960 (as Contact Airways)
- Ceased operations: 2011
- Hubs: Fort McMurray Airport
- Focus cities: Edmonton City Centre (Blatchford Field) Airport; Fort Chipewyan Airport
- Fleet size: 10
- Destinations: 3
- Parent company: Air Mikisew Ltd.
- Headquarters: Fort McMurray, Alberta
- Key people: Graham Davis (General & Operations Manager), Tom Tays (Chief Pilot)

Air Mikisew was a regional airline based in Fort McMurray, Alberta, Canada. Its main base was the Fort McMurray Airport. Mikisew is the Cree word for eagle.

== History ==
The airline was established as Contact Airways in 1960 with a Class 4C operating license, based in Fort McMurray. It was sold in the 1960s and later became wholly owned by the Mikisew Cree First Nation in 1995. It had 63 employees as of at March 2007. It was awarded the Fort McMurray Business of the Year award in 2005. The airline was grounded in 2010, and permanently closed by 2011.

== Destinations ==
Air Mikisew provided scheduled flights between Fort Chipewyan, Fort McMurray, and Edmonton. It also provided aero-medical flights for the Regional Municipality of Wood Buffalo area and charter flights throughout western Canada.

== Fleet ==
In June 2010, the Air Mikisew fleet consisted of the following aircraft until its audit by Transport Canada:

- 2 - British Aerospace Jetstream 31 (one Executive and one Commuter configuration)
- 1 - Raytheon Beech 1900D
- 1 - Raytheon Beech B99
- 1 - Raytheon Beech King Air B200 Medevac
- 1 - Cessna 208 Caravan (Amphibious in the summer)
- 2 - Piper PA-31-350 Navajo Chieftains
- 1 - Cessna 207
- 1 - Cessna 206
- 1 - Cessna 185 (on floats)

== See also ==
- List of defunct airlines of Canada
