= Air Alma =

Airline based in Quebec, Canada, 1959–2002

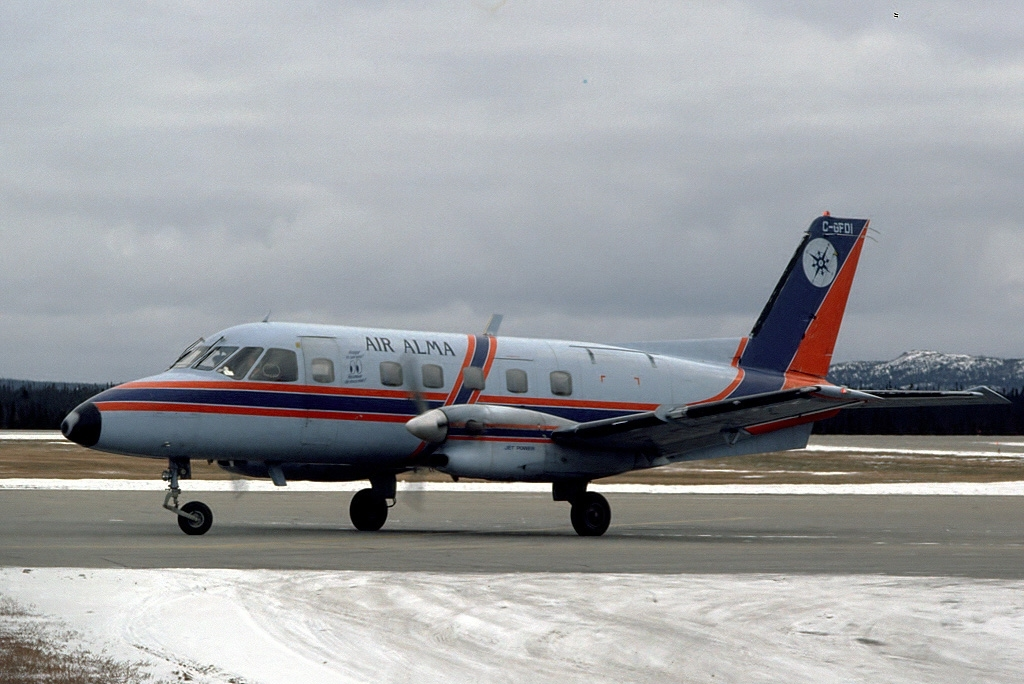
IATA	ICAO	Call sign
QB	AAJ	AIR ALMA
- Founded: 1959
- Ceased operations: January 29, 2002
- Hubs: Alma
- Subsidiaries: Air Quebec Metro, C.M.T.A INC.
- Fleet size: Various
- Destinations: Various
- Headquarters: Head Office: 693 SacreCoeur Est, CP 577, Alma, Quebec, Canada G8B 5W1.: 051-36105
- Key people: Roland Simard, Roger Filion
- Employees: 15 (2002)
- Website: https://web.archive.org/web/19991115070735/http://www.airalma.com/

Air Alma was a Canadian-based airline that existed from 1959 to 2002. In 1980, Alma Air Services was renamed to Air Alma. Air Alma was based out of Alma, Quebec. Air Alma operated aircraft like the EMB 110. As a smaller airline it is less documented but was a Canadian Airlines partner. It was the official carrier of the 35th edition of the Quebec summer games. One contributing factor to Air Alma's demise was Air Creebec as Alma struggled to keep Air Creebec out of Alma.

== History ==
Air Alma was founded in 1959 as Metrolitan Air Services and was renamed to Alma Air services in 1960. In 1980 Alma Air Services was renamed to Air Alma. Alma Air Services operated aircraft like the Fairchild hiller FH-1100 in 1979.

In the early 1980s the company had 52 employees and Roland Simard as its president, with a fleet consisting of two Cessna 404s and operated charters and Air Ambulance services. In 1989 it was reported that following an interline agreement being signed by Air Alma and Air Canada the carrier operated Ottawa-Toronto route which first flew on March 1. Later that same year a Learjet 24 was procured by Air Alma.

In 1990 a brief subsidiary called Air Quebec Metro was formed which ceased operations the same year. In 1994 Air Alma denied the disciplinary action but later suspended that same pilot. In 1995 the 35th addition of the Quebec Summer games were held in Alma which made Air Alma the official carrier for the Quebec Summer games.

In 2000 Air Alma had a dispute with Air Creebec over landing slots in Alma, this was because the Montreal-Alma route was the core of Air Alma's business and the mayor of Alma refused to let Air Creebec gain slots at Alma. In 2001 Air Alma partner Canadian Airlines ceased operations and merged into Air Canada so Air Canada had to figure out what to do with the Canadian Regional affiliates into its network. The Alma mayor also boycotted Air Canada since Air Creebec was an Air Canada affiliate. The airline in 2001 after 9/11 saw a 50% passenger number decrease and 60 employees being laid off. On January 9, 2002 the Alma-Montreal route was terminated. In the end Air Alma ceased to exist in 2002 ending 43 years of aviation history.

== Fleet ==
- Bell 206
- Fairchild hiller FH-1100
- Lear 24
- PA 31
- EMB 110
- EMB 120
- Cessna 404 Titan

== Destinations ==
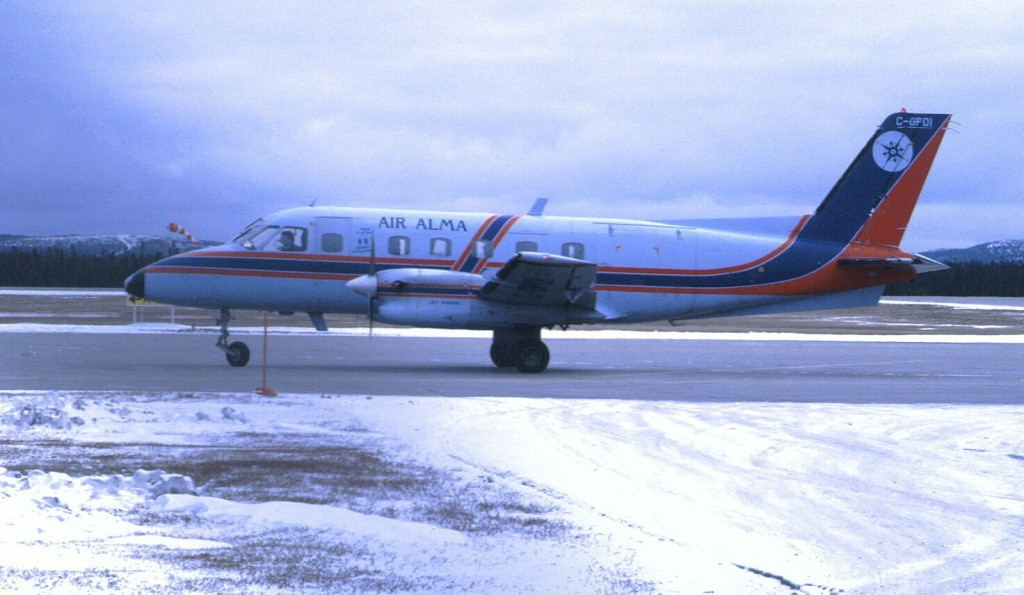
Air Alma EMB 110 Barandite in Wabush

Air Alma operated services to

=== Canada ===
- Alma
- Roberval (QC)
- Montreal
- Toronto
- Ottawa
- Wabush
- Chute-Des-Passes
- Chibougamau
- Bagotville

== Partners ==
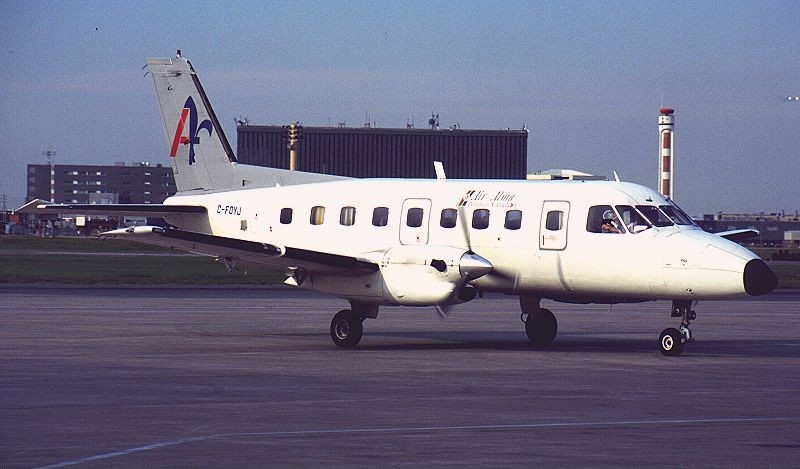
This EMB 110 had partinere Canadien titles

Air Alma was a partner of Canadian Airlines until 2001 when Canadian ceased operations. The airline also had an interline agreement with Air Canada on the Toronto-Montreal route. The airline was the 1995 Quebec Summer Games official partner.

== Accident ==
On July 4, 1995 a Bell 206 crashed after losing power. The Bell 206 registered as C-GLBA was the Bell 206 involved. All occupants survived

== See also ==
List of Defunct airlines of Canada
