= Vistajet =

Low-cost airline of Canada

IATA	ICAO	Call sign
5V	VJT	VISTA
- Founded: April 1997
- Ceased operations: September 1997
- Operating bases: Windsor International Airport
- Fleet size: 3
- Headquarters: Windsor, Ontario, Canada

Vistajet was a Canadian low-cost airline based in Windsor, Ontario and was established in April 1997. Vistajet operated a fleet of leased Boeing 737-200 aircraft, but the airline ceased operations in September 1997, due to lower-than-expected passenger traffic.

== History ==
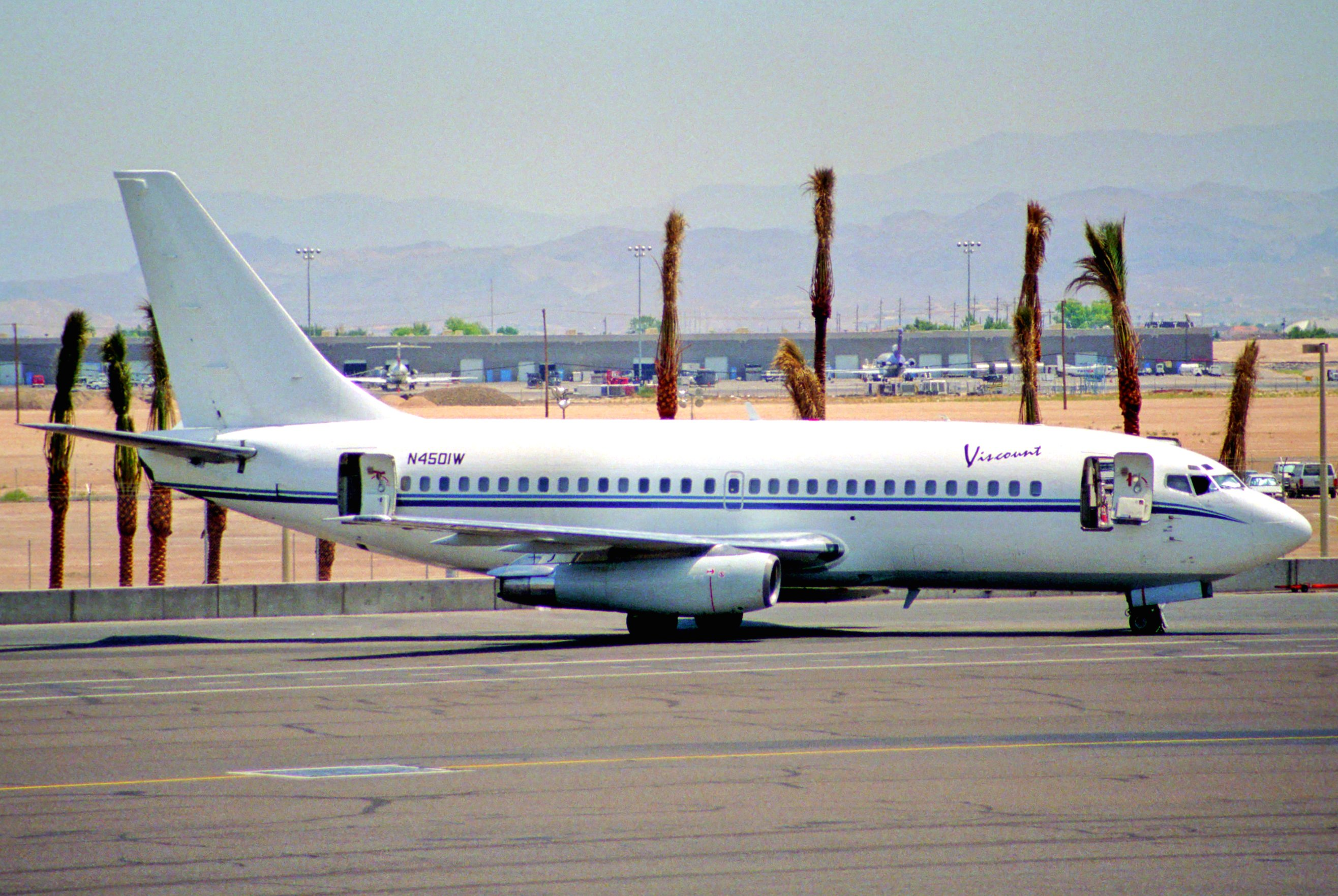
One of the Boeing 737-200 leased by Vistajet, operating for Viscount Air, 1995

Vistajet, based in Windsor, Ontario, entered the eastern Canada market in April 1997 as a low-cost carrier, but ceased operations in September 1997 due to lower than expected passenger traffic. The company planned to become a national carrier offering value-conscious leisure and business travelers the convenience of flying at a rate comparable to driving or taking the train.

The Globe & Mail reported that a consultant's report prepared for the board of Air Canada suggests that the premier airline in Canada was able to force out new competitors such as Vistajet by lowering prices and adding capacity during the 1990s.

== Services ==
The airline operated services to Calgary, Winnipeg, Thunder Bay, Halifax, Ottawa, Toronto and Windsor.

== Fleet ==
Vistajet operated a fleet consisting of Boeing 737-200 jetliners. The aircraft were leased.

Vistajet fleet
Aircraft	Number	Passengers (Economy)	Notes
Boeing 737-200	3	?	Aircraft were leased

=== Livery ===
Vistajet's aircraft were primarily painted in white, except for the tail, logo, and horizontal stripe on the fuselage.

The fuselage had the Vistajet logo printed in between the boarding door and the overwing exit, above the windows. Below the windows, there was a stripe that was divided into two colours, black at the top and maroon at the bottom.

The tail of the aircraft was primarily painted in maroon, with a white arc from the middle-left of the tail to the bottom-right of the tail.

== See also ==
- List of defunct airlines of Canada
