= Triton Airlines =

Canadian airline

IATA	ICAO	Call sign
—	DRC	TRITON AIR
- Commenced operations: 1993
- Ceased operations: 1994
- Operating bases: St. John's International Airport
- Fleet size: 1 Boeing 737
- Key people: Jason, Javis Roberts

Triton Airlines was an airline based in St. John's, Newfoundland, Canada operated by Jason and Javis Roberts from February 1993 to October 1994.

== Fleet ==
- Boeing 737

== See also ==
- List of defunct airlines of Canada
