= Trans-Provincial Airlines =

Canadian airline, 1960–1993

Trans Provincial Airlines (TPA)
- Founded: 1960
- Ceased operations: 1993
- Operating bases: Prince Rupert Airport
- Fleet size: 25
- Key people: Dave Marko

Trans Provincial Airlines was an airline based in Prince Rupert, British Columbia, Canada, established as Trans Provincial Air Carriers in 1960. On 15 January 1970 TPA acquired Omineca Air Service based at Burns Lake Airport.

TPA was acquired by Harbour Air in 1993.

== Fleet ==
- 2- DC-3
- 1- Fairchild F27A
- 1- Piper Aztec
- 1- Beech 18
- 7- DHC Beaver
- 4- DHC Otter
- 5- Grumman Goose
- 2- Cessna 185
- 1- Cessna 180
- 1- Piper Cherokee

== See also ==
- List of defunct airlines of Canada
