= Canada West Airlines =

Canadian airline

- Founded: 2002
- Ceased operations: 2004
- Headquarters: Canada

Canada West Airlines was an airline based in Canada. It ceased operations in 2004.

== History ==
The airline was established in 2002 and planned to offer charter services. It was hoping to begin services with two premium-configured Boeing 757 aircraft, offering full service flights from Edmonton, Calgary and Vancouver to European and sunspot destinations. The start of the Iraq War, the steep rise in oil prices, the SARS epidemic and the poor investment climate for airline projects all contributed to a decision to revamp the original Canada West business model. The founders continued to pursue the start-up venture and secured funding to continue the project in 2006.

== See also ==
- List of defunct airlines of Canada
