= BCWest Air =

Canadian airline (2007–2008)

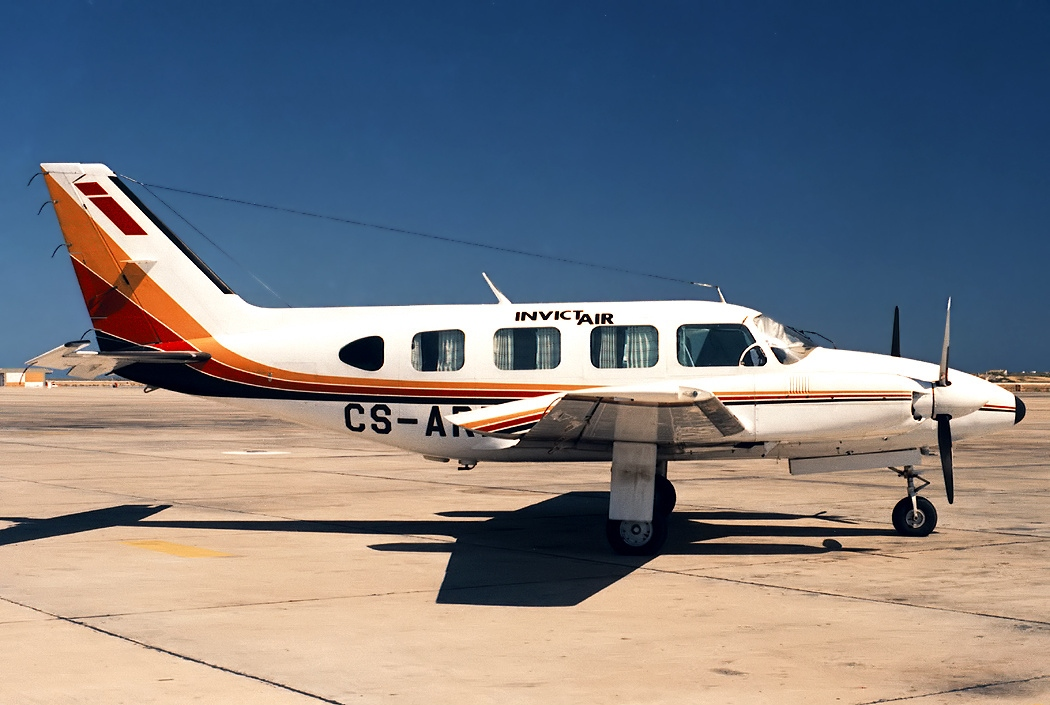
- Founded: 10 th September 2007
- Ceased operations: 2008
- Hubs: Abbotsford International Airport
- Focus cities: Nanaimo
- Fleet size: 2
- Destinations: 4
- Headquarters: Abbotsford, British Columbia
- Website: www.flybcair.com

BCWest Air was a small airline based in Abbotsford, British Columbia, Canada. Its routes were from the mainland to Vancouver Island since 10th September 2007, but ended in October 2008 due to unresolved shareholder dispute.

== Routes ==
Routes flown were:

- Nanaimo - Abbotsford, British Columbia
- Abbotsford, British Columbia - Nanaimo
- Abbotsford, British Columbia - Victoria, British Columbia
- Victoria, British Columbia - Abbotsford, British Columbia
- Victoria, British Columbia - Nanaimo
- Nanaimo - Victoria, British Columbia

== Fleet ==
The fleet consisted of a Piper PA-31 Navajo and a Cessna 402.

== See also ==
- List of defunct airlines of Canada
