= Green Airways =

Defunct Canadian airline

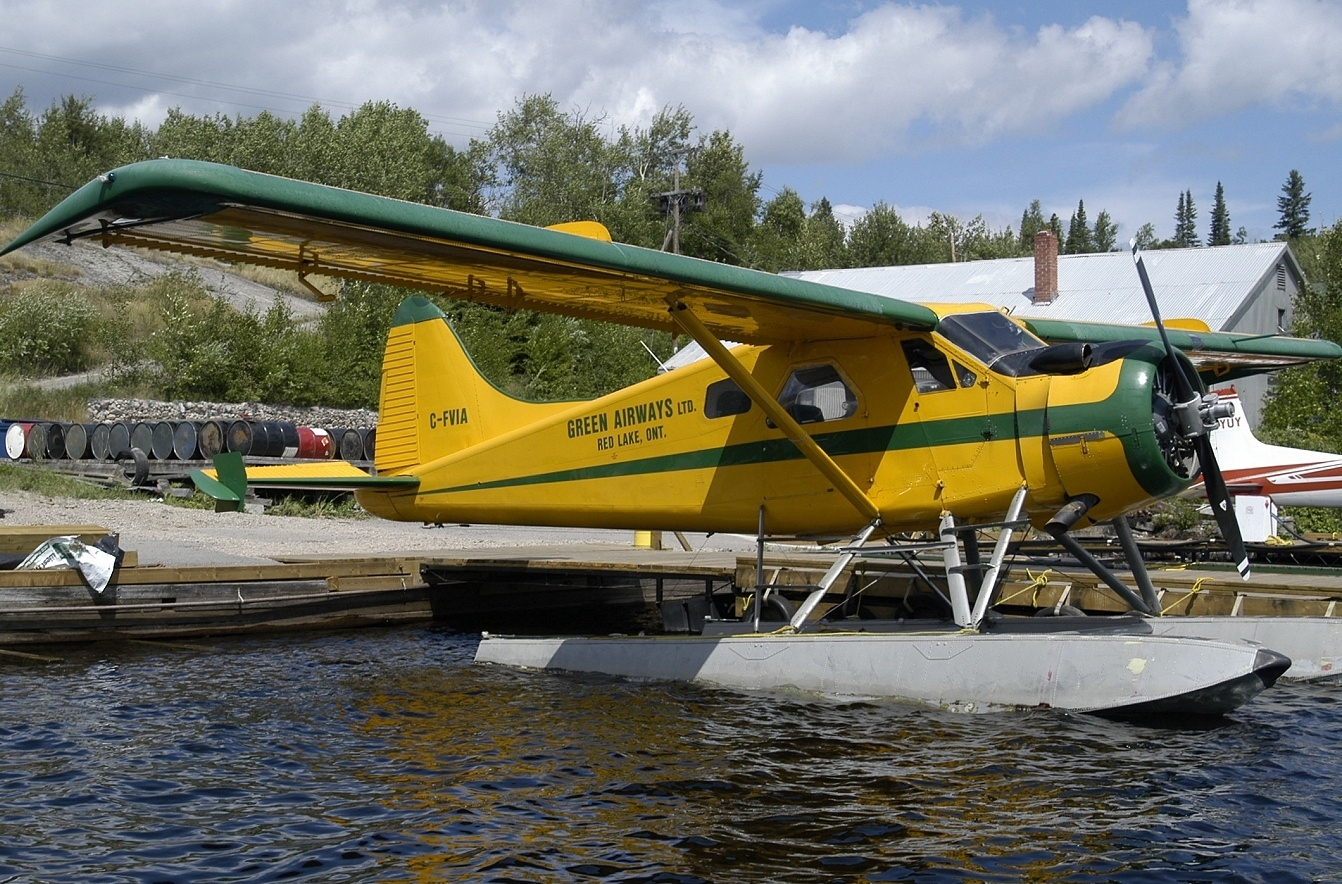
IATA	ICAO	Call sign
-	-	-
- Founded: 1960
- Ceased operations: 2017
- Operating bases: Red Lake, Ontario
- Headquarters: P.O. Box 331 68 Howey St., Red Lake, ON, Canada, Ontario
- Key people: George Green (Canada)

Green Airways was a Canadian airline based out of Red Lake that operated from 1960 to 2017.

== History ==
The history of Green Airways can be traced back to 1925 when gold was discovered in Red Lake. Dozens of airlines began flying into Red Lake with one of the first being Chukuni Airways. The airline was founded in 1950 as one of the longer term based airlines in the town along with another one which later became Nunasi Airlines yet it was not up until 1956 that Green Airways began operations after a long fought court battle with the help of an experienced transport lawyer. The airline's founder who was George Green whose first aircraft was the Gull Wing SR9. It was one of the main operators based out of Red Lake.

Historically the airline was owned by Jack Green's Fly In Camps and provided fishing, mining, freighting & tourism. In 2017 the airline's assets were acquired by Superior Airways though it's unclear if Green is still operational.

== Fleet ==
- Noorduyn Norseman Mk.VI
- De Havilland Canada DHC-2 Beaver
- De Havilland Canada DHC-3 Otter
- Stinson SR-9FM Reliant
- Beech Expeditor 3NM
- Cessna 180

== Accident ==
A DHC 2 of Green Airways crashed after a failure of the right float

== See also ==
List of defunct airlines of Canada
