= Air Melançon =

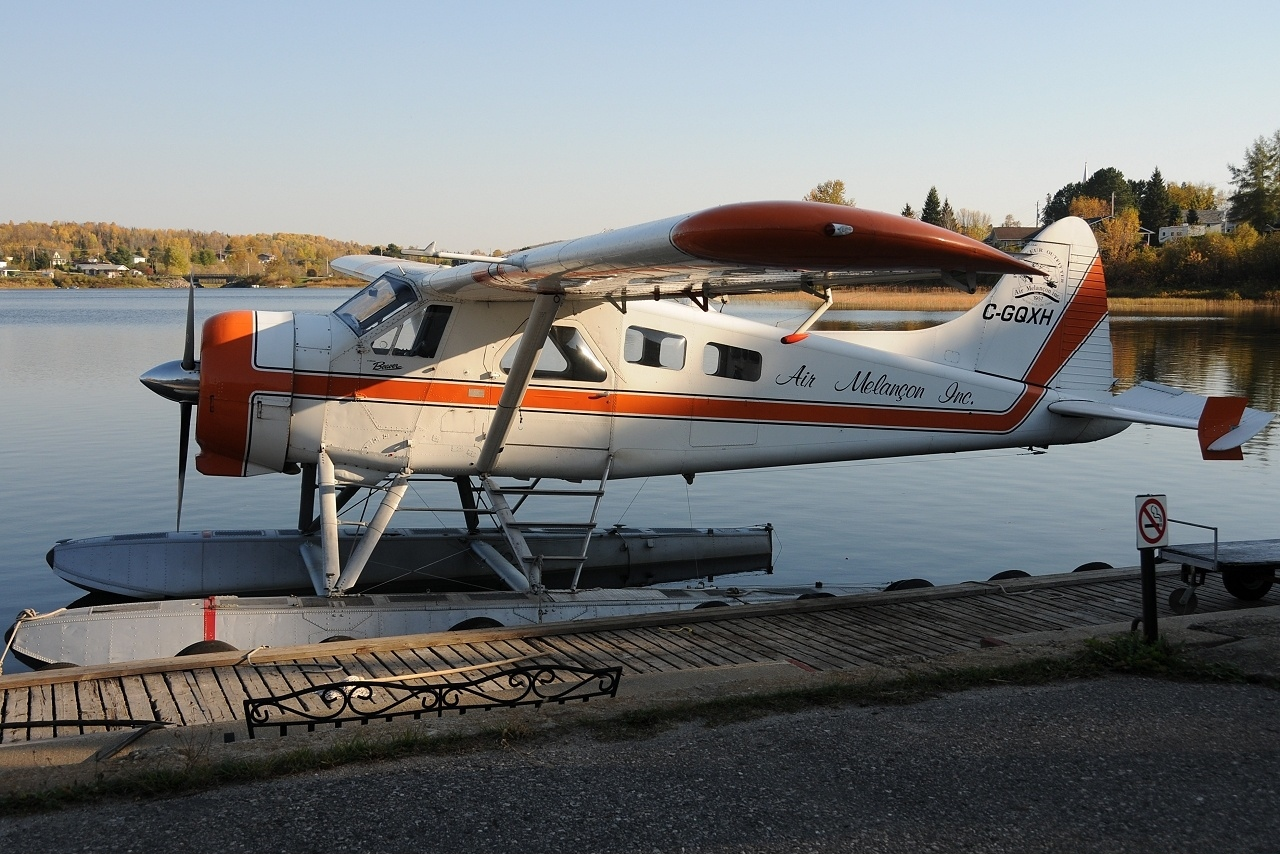
IATA	ICAO	Call sign
-	-	-
- Founded: 1957
- Ceased operations: 2017
- Fleet size: 2
- Key people: Zénon Melançon

Air Melançon was an airline based out of Mont-Laurier, Quebec, Canada, which was bought by Air Tamarac in 2017.

== History ==
The airline was founded in 1957 by Zénon Melançon founded the Moselle private flying club following a contract to establish a large chalet on Kelly Lake with his first aircraft, being a Cessna 180 using aviation to fly to inaccessible areas in the region. In 1960 a second Cessna was added to the fleet of the airline and his brother Réal Melançon as a pilot.

When Zeon passed away in 1965, his wife would take over the position of managing the company before it was sold to her brother-in law Réal. Réal built a base across from the docs and would grow the airline to have 6 seaplanes. The airline was then passed to his daughter Francine.

In 2017 the airline was bought by the airline another local Quebec based airline called Air Tamarac. At the time of the acquisition the airline operated a fleet of 2 DHC-2 aircraft and had 17 employees, the airline had services for Leisure Facilities and hotels and resorts at the time of its demise.

== See also ==
- List of defunct airlines of Canada
