= Vision Airways Corporation =

IATA	ICAO	Call sign
V6	VSN	VISION
- Ceased operations: November 25, 1994
- Headquarters: Timmins, Ontario, Canada

Vision Airways Corporation was an airline based in Timmins, Ontario, Canada. On 25 November 1994 its operating licenses were suspended.

== See also ==
- List of defunct airlines of Canada
