= Corporate Express (airline) =

Canadian airline

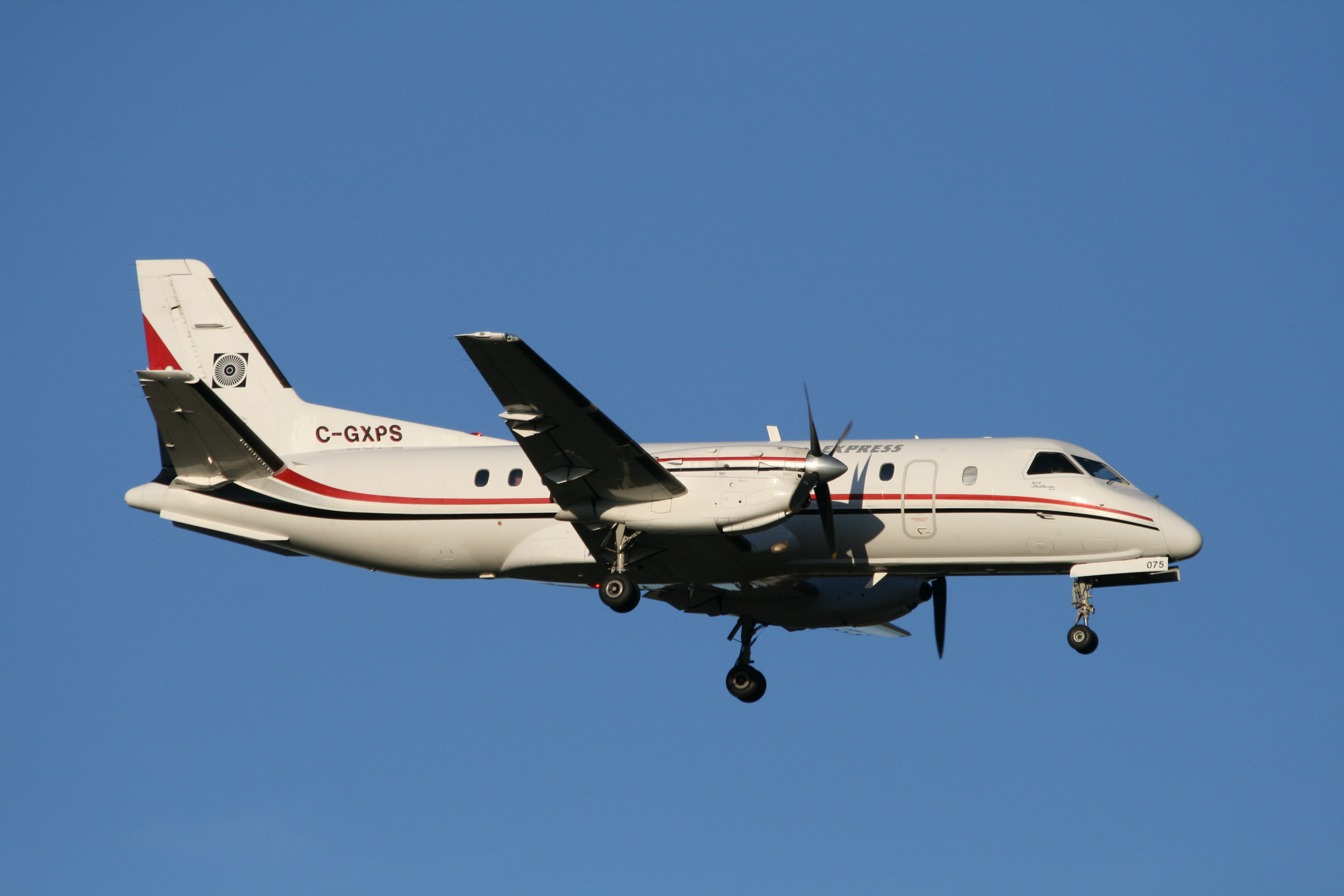
IATA	ICAO	Call sign
-	CPB	PENTA
- Founded: 1975
- Ceased operations: 2009
- Fleet size: 1
- Parent company: Corpac Canada Limited
- Headquarters: Calgary, Alberta, Canada

Corporate Express was an airline based at Calgary International Airport in Calgary, Alberta, Canada. The airline shut down operations on June 18, 2009.

== History ==
The genesis of Corpac Canada was in the early 1970s with Gord Peariso establishing Peariso Aviation, as an aircraft maintenance and parts supplier. His first-class maintenance facility serviced over 30 major oil companies operating their own aircraft in western Canada.

In the mid-1980s Peariso Aviation acquired Corpac Canada Ltd., which represented the Piper Aircraft Corporation and sold the Piper Cheyenne turboprop aircraft across Canada.

Corpac Canada eventually acquired an aircraft and diversified into the aircraft charter business. In 1991 Corporate Express Business and Charter Airline established the first corporate shuttle service in Western Canada operating between Calgary and Edmonton for the TELUS Corporation (then AGT) using the 18 passenger British Aerospace Jetstream 32.

Over the course of the next 10 years, Corporate Express Business and Charter Airline at times included several scheduled shuttle routes and charters, as determined by customer demand for these services.

It was with the customer in mind that the SAAB 340 Airliner was acquired in the year 2000. This 30 passenger aircraft marked the millennium for Corporate Express and once again raised the standard for corporate shuttle services and charters within Western Canada.

== Destinations ==
Corporate Express operated a scheduled air service between Calgary and Fort McMurray, Alberta.

== Fleet ==
The Corporate Express fleet consisted of the following aircraft:

- 1 Saab 340A
- 3 Piaggio P180 Avanti II
- 1 Saab 340B
- 2 BAe Jetstream 31

== See also ==
- List of defunct airlines of Canada
