= Brock Air Services =

Canadian charter and Medivac airline

IATA	ICAO	Call sign
-	BRD	BROCK AIR
- Founded: 1978
- Fleet size: 2
- Parent company: Brock Air Services Limited
- Headquarters: Kingston, Ontario, Canada
- Key people: F. Dean Glover, President
- Website: http://www.brockair.com

Brock Air Services was a Canadian charter and Medivac airline based in Kingston, Ontario, Canada.

== History ==
The airline was founded in 1978.

== Operations ==
Brock Air Services operated on-demand air charter services at Kingston Airport and Brockville Municipal Airport. The airline provided air ambulance service under contract with Ornge (Ontario Air Ambulance). The airline also manages the Brockville airport.

== Fleet ==
As of January 2006 the company operated:

- 1 Cessna 421
- 1 Cessna 172

== See also ==
- List of defunct airlines of Canada
