= NextJet Canada =

Virtual airline

NextJet Canada was a virtual airline which for a short time connected several cities in Ontario and Quebec. In 2016, Nextjet Canada offered flights from Kitchener, ON; Peterborough, ON; Gatineau, QC and Montreal, QC. In the same year, the company ceased all operations.

Nextjet Canada did not own any aircraft; instead they leased aircraft from the operator and sold the seats to the public.

== History ==
NextJet Canada was founded in 2016 by Tan Ahmed. To facilitate flights from Kitchener, the Waterloo Region municipality agreed to contribute to start-up costs. In May of that year NextJet began offering daily flights between Kitchener and Peterborough in Ontario and Montreal, in a rented nine seat plane. At the end of May flights to Gatineau, near Ottawa were added, although at that time information the company's website had not been translated into French.

In the summer of 2016 NextJet suspended its flights because it had failed to attract enough customers on a regular basis to make a profit.

== See also ==
- List of defunct airlines of Canada
