= Air Southwest (Canada) =

Canadian airline

IATA	ICAO	Call sign
-	ASW	AIR SOUTHWEST
- Founded: 1983; 43 years ago
- Ceased operations: 2005; 21 years ago
- Hubs: Chilliwack Airport
- Fleet size: 2
- Destinations: 3
- Parent company: Emil Anderson Construction Company Ltd.
- Headquarters: Chilliwack, British Columbia, Canada

Air Southwest Ltd was an airline based in Chilliwack, British Columbia, Canada. It provided chartered flights throughout Western British Columbia, as well as a flight training school. Its main base was Chilliwack Airport. The airline was in operation from 1983 until 2005, and was a fully owned and operated subsidiary company of Emil Anderson Construction Company Ltd.

== Destinations ==
Air Southwest operated scheduled flights to Tipella, Silver River and Bear Creek airstrips located at the shores of Harrison Lake. Scheduled flights left Chilliwack on Monday evenings and Wednesday or Thursday afternoons.

== Fleet ==
- 1 Cessna 206 Stationair
- 1 Cessna 182P Skylane

== See also ==
- List of defunct airlines of Canada
