= CanAir Cargo =

Canadian airline

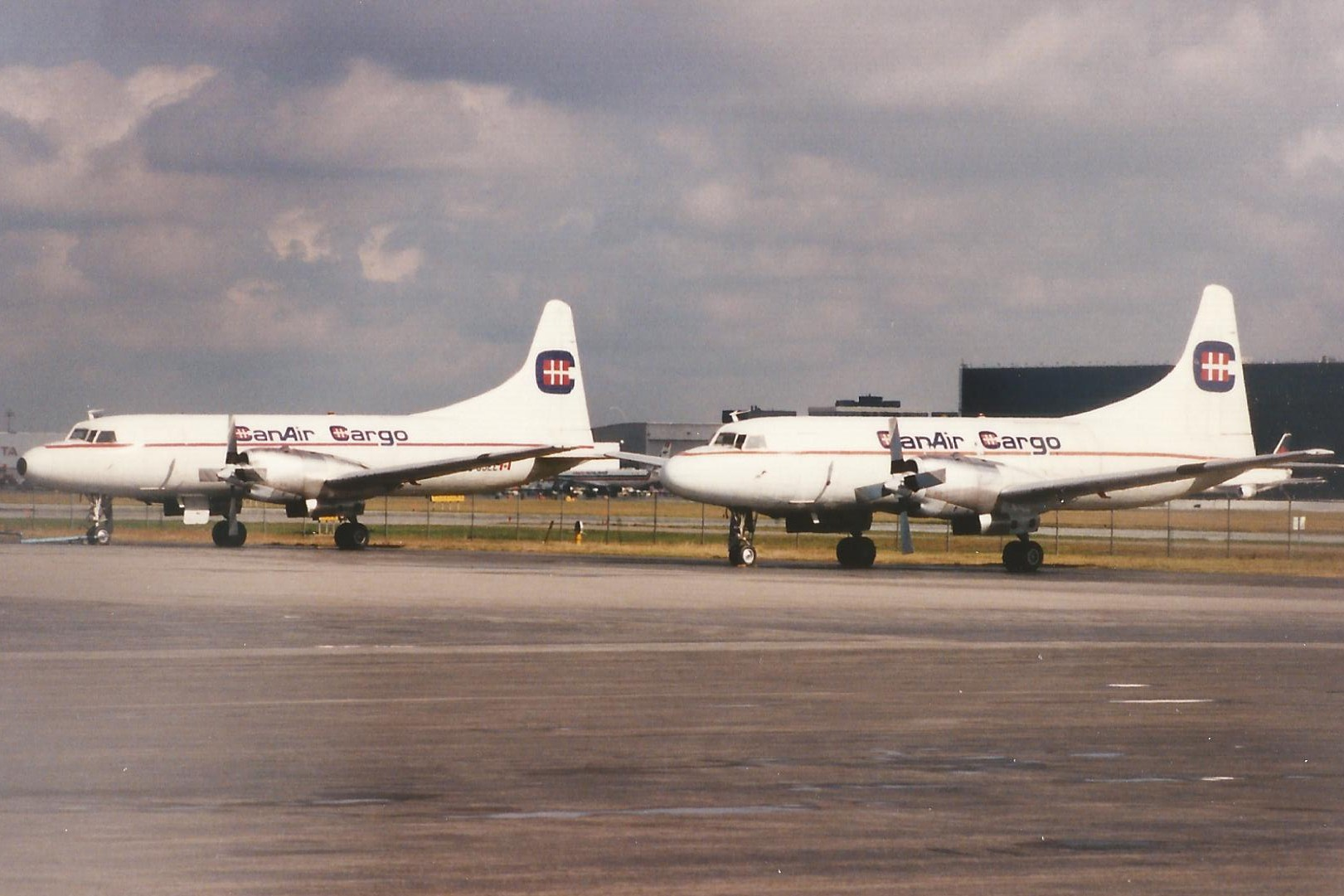
IATA	ICAO	Call sign
n/a	CCW	CANAIR
- Founded: 1990
- Ceased operations: 1997 (taken over by Royal Aviation)
- Hubs: Montreal Mirabel International Airport
- Fleet size: 34 (total aircraft across history)
- Headquarters: 2450 Derry Road East, Mississauga, ON
- Key people: John MacKenzie, Murray Lantz

CanAir Cargo was a Canadian-based cargo and charter airline that existed from 1990 to 1997. It was taken over by Royal Aviation in 1997 and offered international, regional, and domestic cargo services. It was based out of Montreal Mirabel International Airport.

== History ==
CanAir Cargo was founded in 1990 and John MacKenzie and Murray Lantz had a 30% stake in the airline, they later the sold it in 1992. In 1997 the airline was taken over by Royal Aviation and ceased operations the same year, Royal planned to keep CanAir's coast to coast network and add 3 more 737-200 aircraft to the fleet.

== Fleet ==
- CV 580
- 737-200
- A320
- Short 330-100
- Cessna Citation 500
- Swearingen Merlin Metro
- Beech 99
- 737-400

== Accident ==
On 21 July 1993, Canair Cargo Flight 801, C-GQHB, a Convair 580, departed from Vancouver, British Columbia, on a charter flight to Tofino carrying 51 occupants. The plane overran the runway at Tofino, damaging the aircraft beyond repair.

September 18, 1991 a CV 580 broke apart over Belvidere Centre which killed 2 people.

== See also ==
- List of defunct airlines of Canada
