= Alta Flights =

Canadian airline

IATA	ICAO	Call sign
-	ALZ	-
- Founded: 1986
- Hubs: Edmonton International Airport
- Fleet size: 18
- Parent company: Sunwest Aviation
- Headquarters: Edmonton, Alberta, Canada
- Website: http://www.altaflights.com/

Alta Flights was a charter airline based in Edmonton, Alberta, Canada. It operated regional passenger and cargo charters throughout Canada and the United States. Its main base was Edmonton International Airport, with hubs at Edmonton City Centre Airport and at Calgary International Airport.

== History ==
The airline was established and started operations in 1986 as Alberta Express. It started scheduled services on 19 November 2001. Scheduled services were suspended on 1 January 2006. It was wholly owned by Telford Resources and has 105 employees. As of 1 October 2014, Alta Flights became part of Sunwest Aviation.

== See also ==
- List of defunct airlines of Canada
