= World-Wide Airways =

- Founded: 1947; 79 years ago
- Founder: Donald McVicar
- Defunct: 1965
- Headquarters: Montreal, Quebec, Canada

World-Wide Airways was a Canadian airline started in 1947 by Donald McVicar (1915-1997), a former RAF Command pilot. Based at Montreal's Dorval Airport, it played a key role in massive airlift operations for Hollinger Ungava Transport and the Distant Early Warning Line in Northern Canada. It also flew livestock and foodstuffs to embargoed Cuba during the 1960s.

Its licence was revoked in 1965 for political reasons. McVicar's publicized fight with the government led him to be featured on the cover of Time Magazine in 1966.

McVicar left Canada and later returned to Montreal as an aviation consultant. He died in 1997 in Dorval, Quebec.

== See also ==
- List of defunct airlines of Canada
