= Abbotsford Air Services =

Airline in British Columbia, Canada

IATA	ICAO	Call sign
-	ABE	ABBY AIR
- Hubs: Abbotsford International Airport
- Key people: Herb Porter, John Spronk, Gordon Kyle Keith

Abbotsford Air Services was an airline in British Columbia, Canada based at Abbotsford International Airport.

== History ==
In 1956 Gordon Kyle Keith worked at Abbotsford Air Services up until 1962 when he became a mechanic at Skyways which later became Conair Aviation. In 1962 Herb Porter was the manager of the airline and John Spronk as the chief pilot. The airline in 1965 introduced new arrivals with a pilot in training from South Africa and a Cessna Skylark from Wichita. In 1967 a company called Northern Helicopters build a hangar next to the Abbotsford Air Services hangar. In 1977 the airline began Abbotsford-Victoria services starting on February 25, 1977 using the BN 2 islander. Like other small airlines the airline vanished from all records after 1977.

== Code Data ==
- IATA: n/a
- ICAO: ABE
- CALLSIGN: ABBY AIR

== Accident ==
On November 18 1976 a Cessna 337 of Abbotsford Air Services would overrun the runway in Duncan and fall into an embankment with 5 occupants.

== See also ==
List of defunct airlines of Canada
