= QuikAir =

Airline

QuikAir Airline Service
| IATA | ICAO | Call sign |
|---|---|---|
| Q9 | - | QuikAir |
- Commenced operations: 2001
- Ceased operations: October 24, 2006
- Fleet size: See Fleet below
- Destinations: Edmonton; Fort McMurray; Penticton
- Headquarters: Calgary, Alberta, Canada

QuikAir (QuikAir Airline Service) was a small Canadian regional airline based in Calgary, Alberta, serving business travellers. QuikAir ceased its operations on October 24, 2006.

== Code data ==
- IATA Code: Q9

== Services ==
QuikAir was launched in 2001, operating over 25,000 flights between Calgary and Edmonton until its closure in 2006. The airline operated four aircraft dedicated to providing 24 daily flights between Calgary and Edmonton, while also operating flights to Fort McMurray and Penticton, British Columbia. Until 2004, it also operated in Quebec and Ontario. Private charters were also available.

== Fleet ==
As of August 2006, the QuikAir fleet included:

- 2 BAe Jetstream 31
- 2 BAe Jetstream 32

== Failure ==
The demise of QuikAir was caused by several different factors:

The scheduled service into Edmonton was restricted to the International Airport only, under the Access Agreement which prevented scheduled flights from serving the City Center Airport. The International Airport, being located in Leduc and not actually Edmonton (18 km from Edmonton, 36 km from Edmonton's downtown), forced many regular business travellers to find other transportation into the downtown core.

The proposed scheduled service into Penticton was met with resistance by means of a Transport Canada representative. Unsatisfied with the Jetstream's single engine performance, it was decided that, in the event of an engine failure, the aircraft could not make it safely back out of the valley in which Penticton lies. Multiple revisions of approach procedures occurred, each which had to be reviewed and approved.

As the Penticton route debuted with much fanfare, many flights were pre-sold to customers. Not wanting to lose their customer base, QuikAir chartered several different airlines to carry their passengers for the scheduled flights while the approach procedures were being worked out. Often there were communication problems between QuikAir, these contracted airlines, and the passengers, which led to customer dissatisfaction.

QuikAir ceased operations as of October 24, 2006, leaving many passengers making new arrangements and fighting for their refunds, and several employees without their last weeks of wages. Bankruptcy was declared November 16, 2007.

The Calgary-Edmonton corridor routes were picked up by Peace Air, which also ran scheduled flights to Fort McMurray. (Peace Air has since ceased operations as of May 18, 2007.)

== See also ==
- List of defunct airlines of Canada
