= Air Club International =

Canadian charter airline

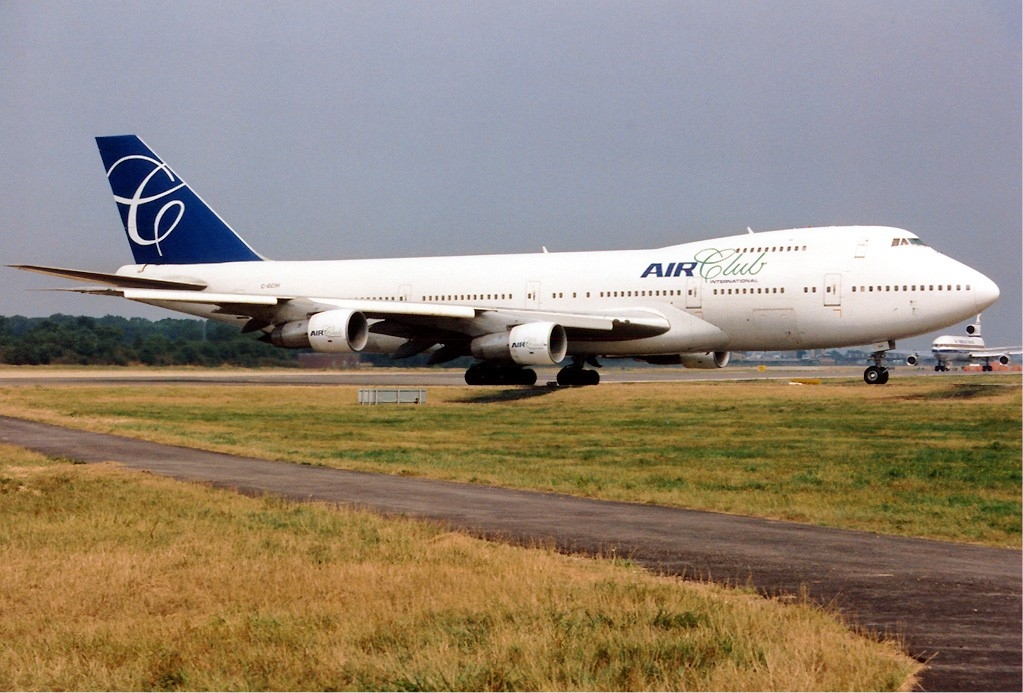
- Air Club International Boeing 747-200
IATA	ICAO	Call sign
HB	CLI	AIR CLUB
- Founded: 1993
- Ceased operations: 1998
- Fleet size: 6
- Destinations: 12
- Key people: Claude Lévesque

Air Club International Ltd. (or ACI) was a Canadian charter airline that operated from 1993 to 1998.

== History ==
The airline was established in 1993, headquartered at Mirabel International Airport (at the time, Montréal, Québec's main international airport) and managed by a group that included several former Nationair executives and presided by Claude Lévesque, to operate charter flights between Canada, Europe and the Caribbean.

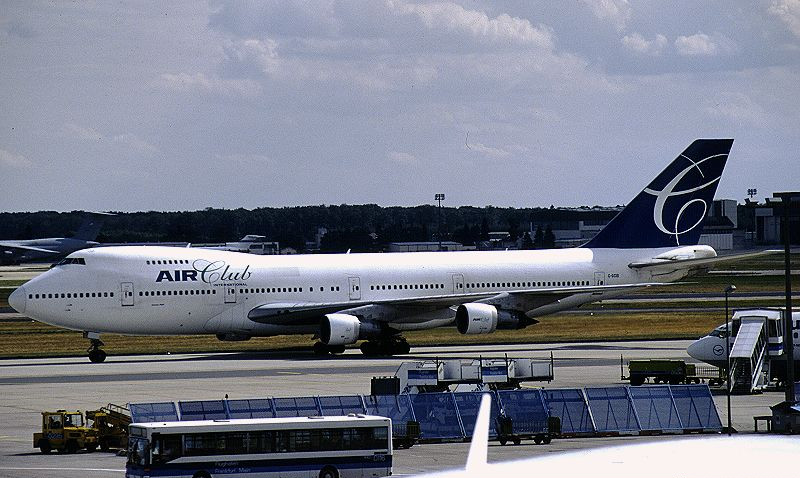
Air Club International Boeing 747-100 at Frankfurt Airport

The carrier's first airplane was an A310-300 acquired via Airbus Leasing and used for routes towards Europe, such as London. Later, the airline obtained additional A310 aircraft and, late in January 1995, began using a Boeing 747-200 leased from Japan Airlines from its Vancouver base.

As part of a contract with Air India, Air Club operated flights from India to several international destinations, starting in 1994. Between seasons, Air Club also operated different contractual flights for various organizations.

Air Club ceased operations in 1998 and returned the leased aircraft to the lessors.

== Destinations ==
=== Europe ===
- Belgium
  - Brussels - Brussels Airport
- France
  - Paris - Charles de Gaulle Airport
- Germany
  - Berlin - Berlin Tegel Airport
  - Frankfurt - Frankfurt Airport
- Netherlands
  - Amsterdam - Amsterdam Airport Schiphol
- United Kingdom
  - London - Heathrow Airport
  - Glasgow - Glasgow Airport

=== North America ===
- Canada
  - Montreal - Montréal–Mirabel International Airport Hub
  - Vancouver - Vancouver International Airport
  - Calgary - Calgary International Airport
- Panama
  - Panama City - Tocumen International Airport

=== South America ===
- Suriname
  - Paramaribo - Johan Adolf Pengel International Airport

== Fleet ==
- 4 Airbus A310
- 2 Boeing 747-200

== See also ==
- List of defunct airlines of Canada
