= Spartan Air Services =

Canadian aviation firm 1946–1972

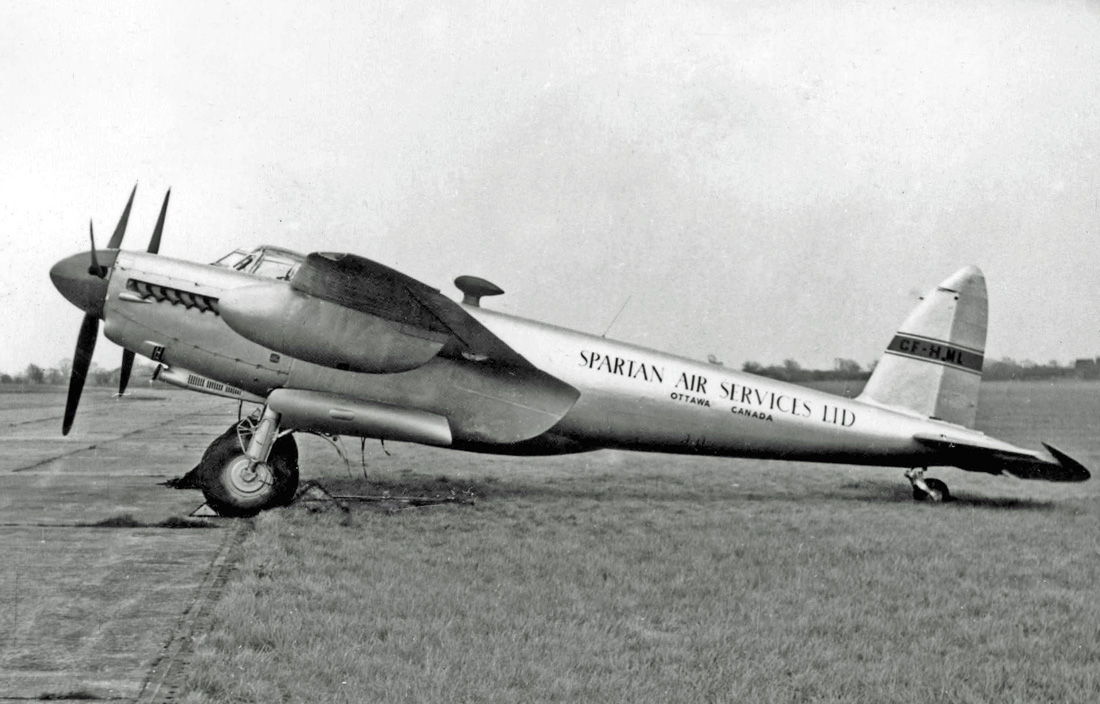
A mosquito of the airline

Spartan Air Services was an aviation firm in Canada from 1946 to 1972.

== History ==
Spartan Air Services was founded after World War 2, the purpose of the airline was so Canada could map the country and open it up for development. The airline would go into the high level of the Aerial Surveys business in 1950. They used the P 38 lightnings but due to their unreliability such as having to add external fuel tanks the airline made Welland Phillips go to England to pick a replacement for the lightnings and would end up picking the De Haviland Mosquito.

In 1954 15 mosquitos would be purchased by Spartan for $5000 ($12000 each in today's dollars) with 9 used for Aerial mapping and the others used for parts. The mosquito with the registration CH-HMS would be the last one to arrive in Canada. The aircraft was often preferred due to the fact it's engines were more reliable. The aircraft were modified to accommodate the aircraft large aircraft cameras with CH-HML being the first one to be equipped with the new configuration.

The airline would also fly out of Cambridge Bay on Victoria Island Shepherd Bay and Mould Bay on Prince Patrick Island, Resolute Bay on Cornwallis Island and Coral Harbor on Southampton Island while Churchill would become an important maintenance and staging base for the airline. Summer fog was also a problem for the airline along with the fact that the airline was suffering fatal accidents with the mosquitos. In 1958 the airline was operating over 60 aircraft. The mosquitos of the airline would be retired of November of 1964 after the airline's last aircraft was written off in Argentina.

In 1961 the airline was one of the largest and most iconic airlines at the time and would charter a helicopter from the airline Skyrotors Limited of Arnprior which was founded in August 1961.

One of the most notable people in the company Nelson Bentley would come back to the airline utilizing the Bell 417 in Nunavut in the Arctic.

The airline would operate until 1973 when it was taken over by a company called Kenting Aviation.

== Countries served ==
United States, Mexico, Argentina, Canada, Colombia, the Dominican Republic, Peru, Belize, British Guiana, Trinidad, Grand Bahamas, Liberia, Nigeria, Kenya, Somalia, Tanzania, Mozambique, Togo, the Seychelles, Iran, India, Malaya, the Philippines, Laos.

== See also ==
List of defunct airlines of Canada
