= Kootenay Direct Airlines =

Airline based in Nelson, British Columbia, Canada

Kootenay Direct Airlines Ltd.
- Founded: 2006
- Ceased operations: 2009
- Fleet size: 5
- Headquarters: Nelson, British Columbia

Kootenay Direct Airlines Ltd. was an airline based in Nelson, British Columbia, Canada. It operated charter services to destinations in British Columbia, Canada, and the United States.

It was founded in 2006 and sent defunct in 2009.

== See also ==
- List of defunct airlines of Canada
