= Eastern Canada Air Lines =

- Founded: 1936
- Ceased operations: 1938
- Fleet size: 5? General Aircraft Monospar
- Headquarters: Moncton, New Brunswick
- Key people: Richard (Dick) Thorne McCully managing director

Eastern Canada Air Lines was an airline company based in Moncton, New Brunswick, Canada in the 1930s. The owners included Richard (Dick) Thorne McCully, the company's first managing director. It began operations in 1936 with five General Aircraft Monospar aircraft manufactured by General Aircraft Limited in England. Three of the aircraft were damaged in accidents, and the company ceased operation in 1938.

== See also ==
- List of defunct airlines of Canada
