= Sonicblue Airways =

Canadian airline (2002–2006)

IATA	ICAO	Call sign
VL	-	-
- Commenced operations: 2002
- Ceased operations: 2006
- Operating bases: Vancouver, British Columbia, Canada
- Fleet size: See Fleet below
- Destinations: See Destinations below
- Parent company: International Express Air Charter Ltd.
- Headquarters: Richmond, British Columbia, Canada

Sonicblue Airways was an airline based in Vancouver, British Columbia, Canada, with their headquarters in Richmond. SonicBlue offered both scheduled and charter services and would fly anywhere in North America. For maintenance failings (and following an accident) Transport Canada suspended Sonicblue's operating license and grounded the company's fleet in January 2006.

== Code data ==
- IATA Code: VL

== History ==
It was operated by International Express Air Charter Ltd. and was formed after Regency Express acquired North Vancouver Air in 2002 and rebranding the airline SonicBlue Airways.

== Incidents and accidents ==
- On 21 January 2006 a Sonicblue Cessna 208B Grand Caravan (C-GRXZ) chartered flight from Tofino to Vancouver was trying to divert to Port Alberni after a pilot mayday, but crashed 12 km (7.5 mi) from Port Alberni killing one crew member and two passengers. Five passengers survived. The investigation showed that a turbine blade snapped off in the engine due to fatigue. Subsequent investigations showed that six of Sonicblue's aircraft (including the Cessna Caravan involved in the accident) were overdue their mandatory inspections. As a result, Transport Canada suspended Sonicblue's operating license and grounded the company's fleet.

== See also ==
- List of defunct airlines of Canada
