= R1 Airlines =

Canadian regional airline, 2003–2020

R1 Airlines Ltd.
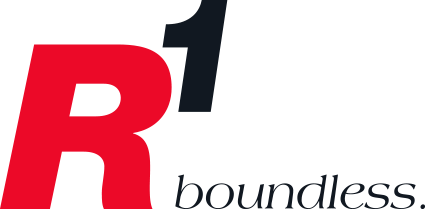
| IATA | ICAO | Call sign |
|---|---|---|
| - | TSH | TRANSCANADA |
- Founded: 2003
- Ceased operations: 2020
- AOC #: n/a
- Fleet size: 8
- Parent company: Regional Express Aviation Ltd.
- Headquarters: Calgary, Alberta, Canada
- Key people: John Binder (CEO) and Al Young (Vice President)
- Website: http://www.r1airlines.ca/

R1 Airlines Ltd., formerly known as Regional 1 Airlines, was a regional airline based in Calgary, Alberta, Canada.

== History ==
It was established and started operations in August 2003 as Westpoint Airlines and renamed to Regional 1 Airlines the following year operating scheduled services in Western Canada. On September 11, 2005, the airline ceased providing scheduled operations and focused entirely on providing business charter services, workforce transportation and ACMI operations. R1 Airlines under Order No. 2019-A-52 had its operating certificates suspended, on April 8, 2019, by the Canadian Transportation Agency. Reason for suspension is listed as "The Licensee has ceased to meet the requirement to hold a valid Canadian aviation document under subparagraphs 61(a)(ii) and 73(1)(a)(ii) of the Canada Transportation Act, S.C., 1996, c. 10, as amended (CTA)". On February 20, 2020, Determination No. A-2020-30 was issued by the Canadian Transportation Agency as The Licensee has requested that the licences remain suspended and not be cancelled. The Canadian Transportation Agency stated that the licences will be automatically cancelled, if they are not reinstated within one year from the date of this Determination.

== Fleet ==
=== Current fleet ===
The R1 Airlines fleet consists of the following aircraft (as of September 2019). All aircraft are listed under Regional 1 Airlines:

R1 Airlines
| Aircraft | No. of aircraft | Variants | Notes |
|---|---|---|---|
| Beechcraft Super King Air | 1 | 300 | |
| Canadair CL-600 (Bombardier CRJ100) | 1 | CL-600-2B19 (Series 100) | |
| Bombardier CL-600 (Bombardier CRJ700) | 1 | CL-600-2C10 (Series 701) | |
| De Havilland Canada Dash 8 | 5 | DHC-8-103, DHC-8-106, DHC-8-301, DHC-8-314 | |

=== Former fleet ===
The airline previously operated other models of the aircraft listed above and the de Havilland Canada DHC-6 Twin Otter.

== Joint venture with Air Georgian ==
On November 15, 2013, Regional 1 and Air Georgian completed a joint venture through the creation of a parent company, Regional Express Aviation Ltd. (REAL), based in Calgary, Alberta and then rebranded under the name of R1 Airlines Ltd. Its new ownership structure gives the subsidiary additional clout in both the domestic and international aircraft, crew, maintenance and insurance (ACMI) business charter markets. One of the immediate benefits delivered through the launch of REAL was Air Georgian's 15-strong fleet of Beech 1900D turboprops, which are now being offered by R1 on both new and existing ACMI contracts in addition to its regular scheduled work for Air Canada. Through its links with Air Georgian and Avmax, R1 Airlines now has access to the world's largest private fleet of Dash 8 and CRJs, while the addition of the 18-seat Beech 1900Ds mean it can now serve far smaller markets that had been inaccessible to its larger types.

The arrangement also provides more than $100 million in spare parts and domestic maintenance bases in Halifax, Montreal, Kingston, Toronto, Calgary and Vancouver. International deployments are supported through Avmax facilities in Great Falls, Montana, Jacksonville, Florida, Nairobi, Kenya and N’djamena, Chad.
