= Fortunair =

Charter airline based in Canada

IATA	ICAO	Call sign
FX	FXE	Air Future
- Founded: 1994
- Ceased operations: 1995

Fortunair Canada was a charter airline based in Canada.

== Code data ==
- IATA Code: FX
- ICAO Code: FXE
- Callsign: AIR FUTURE

== History ==
Fortunair Canada was a Canadian charter passengers airline which began operations in June 1993 created by former Nationair Director, M. Joseph Sandoux, (Civil Engineer) Founder and CEO; using a Boeing 747-200 (manufactured around 1983) leased to own from Washington DC–based aircraft lease company. Fortunair Canada flew every Thursday starting on 24 June 1993 from Toronto Canada to London and Glasgow and every Friday from Montreal to Paris and every Saturday from Montreal to Rome, with 485 passenger seats (25 first class and 460 economy).

== Fleet details ==
1. - Boeing 747-212B

== See also ==
- List of defunct airlines of Canada
