= Globemaster Air Cargo =

- Founded: 2003
- Ceased operations: 2004
- Headquarters: St. Albert, Alberta, Canada

Globemaster Air Cargo was a cargo airline based in St. Albert, Alberta, Canada. It was an all-cargo airline operating scheduled and charter services in Alberta, British Columbia and the Northwest Territories.

== History ==
The airline was established in 2003.

== Fleet ==
The Globemaster Air Cargo fleet consisted of 1 Raytheon Beech 1900C Airliner aircraft in January 2005.

== See also ==
- List of defunct airlines of Canada
