= Lower Peace Region =

- Land-use framework region
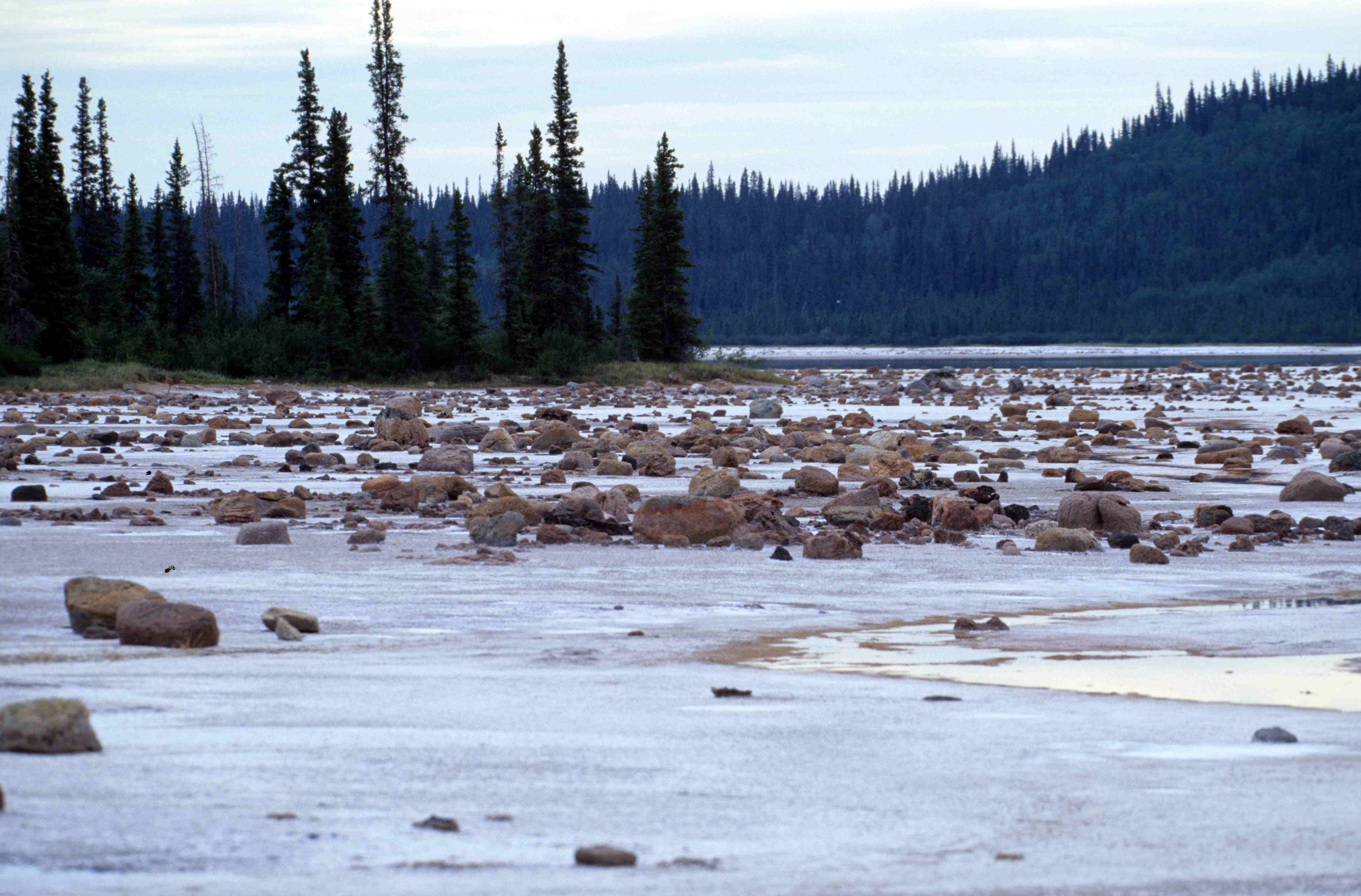
- Salt Plains, Wood Buffalo National Park

- Location in Alberta
- Largest population centres: High Level; La Crete; Wabasca

Government
  - Parent authority: Alberta Environment and Parks

Area
  - Total: 192,198 km^{2} (74,208 sq mi)

Population (2016)
  - Total: 37,759
  - Density: 0.19646/km^{2} (0.50883/sq mi)

The Lower Peace Region is a land-use framework region in northern Alberta, Canada. One of seven in the province, each is intended to develop and implement a regional plan, complementing the planning efforts of member municipalities in order to coordinate future growth. Corresponding roughly to major watersheds while following municipal boundaries, these regions are managed by Alberta Environment and Parks.

With only 37,759 inhabitants spread over 29% of Alberta's landmass, it is the largest, least populated, and least densely populated region of the province.

== Communities ==
The following municipalities are contained in the Lower Peace Region.

Towns

- High Level
- Manning
- Rainbow Lake

Métis settlements

- Paddle Prairie

Municipal districts

- County of Northern Lights
- Municipal District of Opportunity
- Northern Sunrise County

Specialized municipalities

- Mackenzie County

Improvement districts

- Improvement District No. 24 (Wood Buffalo)

Indian reserves

- Amber River 211
- Beaver Ranch 163
- Bistcho Lake 213
- Boyer River 164
- Bushe River 207
- Carcajou 187
- Child Lake 164A
- Fort Vermilion 173B
- Fox Lake 162
- Hay Lake 209
- Jackfish Point 214
- Jean Baptiste Gambler 183
- John D'or Prairie 215
- Loon Lake 235
- Loon Prairie 237
- Peace Point 222
- Swampy Lake 236
- Tallcree 173
- Upper Hay River 212
- Utikoomak Lake 155
- Wabasca 166
- Wadlin Lake 173C
- Woodland Cree 226, 227, 228
- Zama Lake 210
