= Habay, Alberta =

Coordinates: 58°49′59.99″N 118°43′59.98″W

Location of Habay Alberta

Habay is an unincorporated community in northern Alberta, Canada, within the Hay Lake Reserve of the Dene Tha' First Nation. It is located 25 kilometres (16 mi) north of Highway 58 and 99 kilometres (62 mi) northwest of the town of High Level. It has an elevation of 335 m (1,099 ft).

Habay is located at the eastern edge of Hay-Zama Lakes Wildland Provincial Park, a wetlands. Members of the Dene community of Chateh visit Habay yearly for one week with an offering and an opening ceremony accompanied by recreational and arts and crafts activities.

== History ==
In the 1900s, easing out of the nomadic way of life, members of the Dene Tha' First Nation established small settlements in the area, then gradually moved to Habay in the 1950s. After a flood devastated the town in 1962, they moved south to Chateh, which became their main settlement.
