= Mackenzie County =

- Specialized municipality
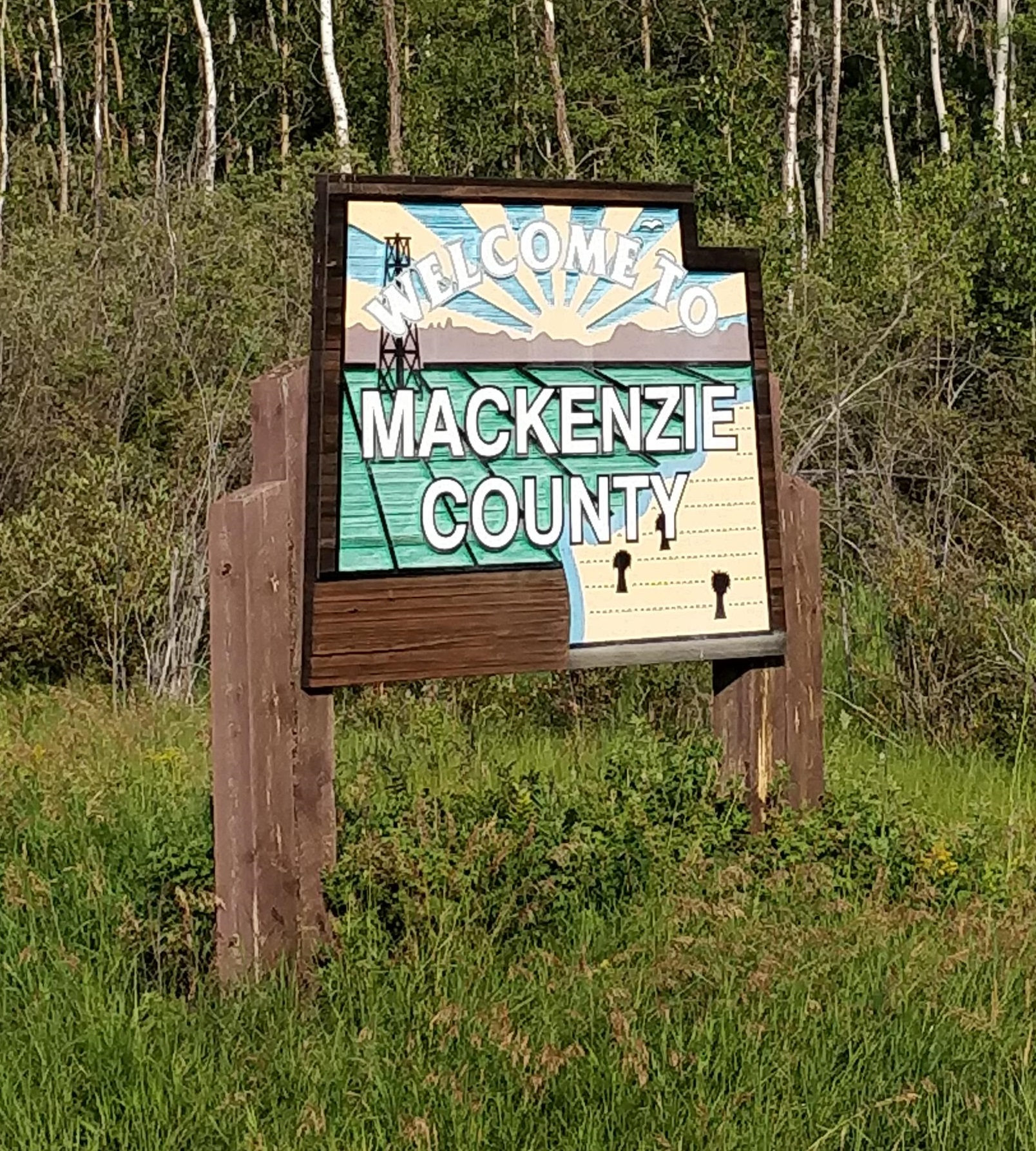
- Welcome sign

- Logo

- Location within Alberta
- Country: Canada
- Province: Alberta
- Region: Northern Alberta
- Planning region: Lower Peace
- Incorporated: Municipal district: January 1, 1995
- Specialized municipality: June 23, 1999
- Name change: March 8, 2007

Government
  - Reeve: Josh Knelsen
  - Governing body: Mackenzie County Council: Jacquie Bateman; Peter F. Braun; Cameron Cardinal; David Driedger; Eric Jorgensen; Joshua Knelsen; Anthony Peters; Ernest Peters; Walter Sarapuk; Lisa Wardley
  - CAO: Bryon Peters
  - Administrative office: Fort Vermilion

Area (2021)
  - Land: 79,629.26 km^{2} (30,745.03 sq mi)

Population (2021)
  - Total: 12,804
  - Density: 0.2/km^{2} (0.52/sq mi)
  - Municipal census (2018): 12,514
- Time zone: UTC−06:00 (Alberta Time)
- Website: mackenziecounty.com

Mackenzie County is a specialized municipality in northern Alberta, Canada. It is located in Census Division 17, along the Mackenzie Highway. The municipal office is located in the hamlet of Fort Vermilion.

== History ==
Originally Improvement District No. 23, the Municipal District of Mackenzie No. 23 incorporated as a municipal district on January 1, 1995. It subsequently changed its status to specialized municipality on June 23, 1999 "to address concerns about municipal government and management in a municipality that serves a number of unique communities within a very large territory." The Municipal District of Mackenzie No. 23 changed its name to Mackenzie County on March 8, 2007.

== Geography ==
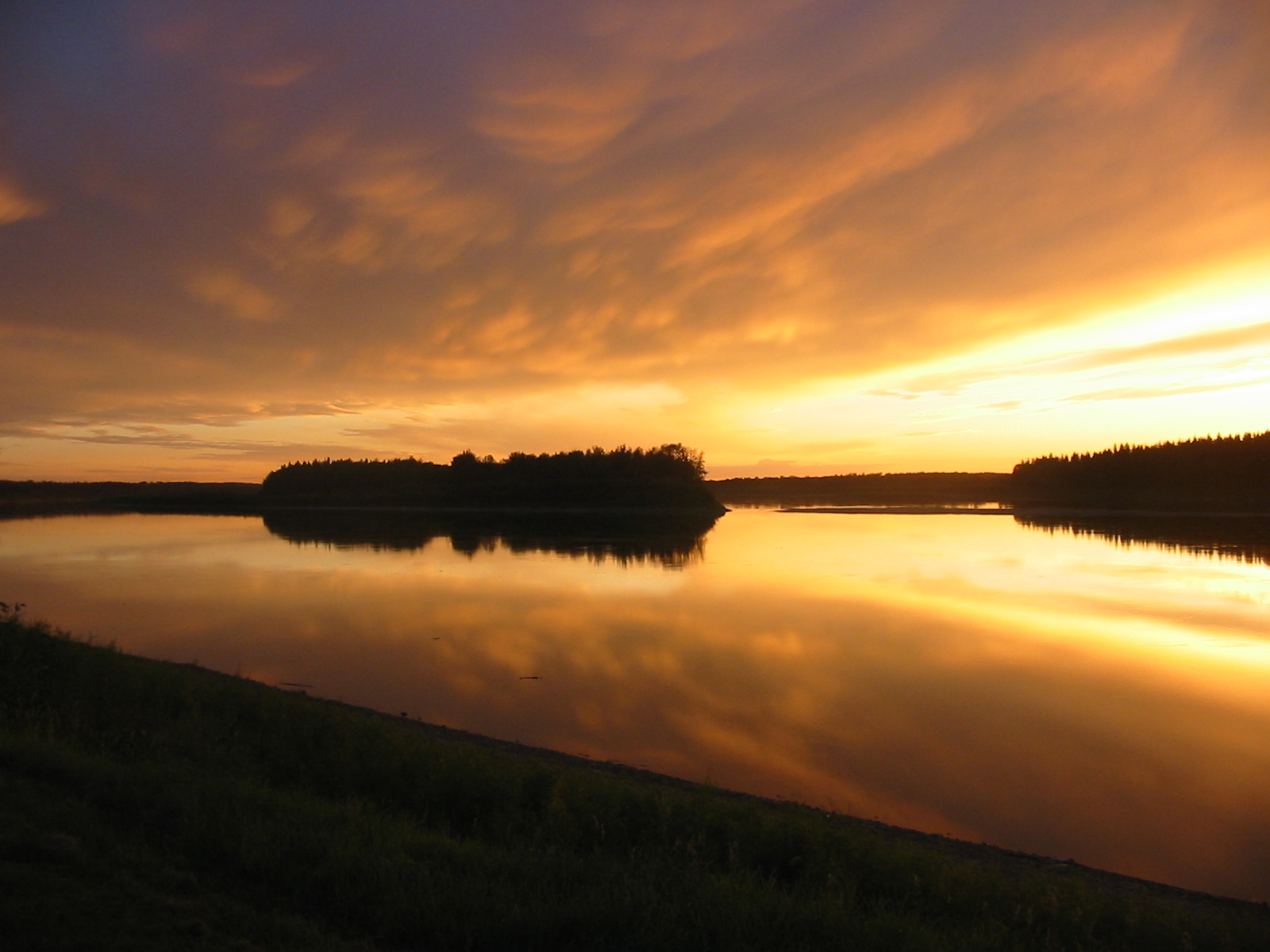
Peace River in Fort Vermilion

Mackenzie County is in the northwest corner of the province of Alberta. It borders the province of British Columbia to the west; the Northwest Territories to the north; Improvement District No. 24 (Wood Buffalo National Park) and the Regional Municipality of Wood Buffalo to the east; and Northern Sunrise County, the Paddle Prairie Metis Settlement, and the County of Northern Lights to the south. The Peace River meanders eastward through the southeast portion of Mackenzie County. Some of its water bodies include Bistcho Lake, Eva Lake, Margaret Lake, Wadlin Lake, Wentzel Lake, and Zama Lake. Land formations include Bootis Hill in the northwest, the Caribou Mountains in the northeast, Buffalo Head Hills in the south, Cameron Hills in the north, and Mount Watt northwest of the Town of High Level.

=== Communities and localities ===
The following urban municipalities are surrounded by Mackenzie County.

Cities

- none

Towns

- High Level
- Rainbow Lake

Villages

- none

Summer villages

- none

The following hamlets are within Mackenzie County.

Hamlets

- Fort Vermilion
- La Crete
- Zama City

The following localities are within Mackenzie County.

Localities

- Adams Landing
- Assumption
- Blumenort
- Boyer
- Boyer River Settlement
- Boyer Settlement
- Buffalo Head Prairie
- Carcajou Settlement
- Chateh
- Footner Lake
- Fort Vermilion Settlement
- Habay

- Hutch Lake
- Indian Cabins
- Little Red River
- Lutose
- Meander River
- Meander River Station
- Metis
- North Vermilion
- North Vermilion Settlement
- Slavey Creek
- Steen River
- Vermilion Chutes

The following settlements are within Mackenzie County.

Settlements

- Boyer
- Footner
- Fort Vermilion
- North Vermilion

- North Zama
- Steen River
- Tugate

First Nations have the following Indian reserves within Mackenzie County.

Indian reserves

- Amber River 211
- Beaver Ranch 163
- Beaver Ranch 163A
- Beaver Ranch 163B
- Bistcho Lake 213
- Boyer 164
- Bushe River 207
- Child Lake 164A
- Fort Vermilion 173B

- Fox Lake 162
- Hay Lake 209
- Jackfish Point 214
- John D'or Prairie 215
- Tallcree 173
- Tallcree 173A
- Upper Hay River 212
- Wadlin Lake 173C
- Zama Lake 210

== Demographics ==
Federal census population history
Year	Pop.	±%
1991	7,260	—
1996	7,980	+9.9%
2001	8,829	+10.6%
2006	10,002	+13.3%
2011	10,927	+9.2%
2016	11,171	+2.2%
2021	12,804	+14.6%
Source: Statistics Canada

In the 2021 Census of Population conducted by Statistics Canada, Mackenzie County had a population of 12,804 living in 3,516 of its 3,756 total private dwellings, a change of 14.6% from its 2016 population of 11,171. With a land area of 79,629.26 km^{2} (30,745.03 sq mi), it had a population density of 0.2/km^{2} (0.4/sq mi) in 2021.

The population of Mackenzie County according to its 2018 municipal census is 12,514, a change of 6.5% from its 2015 municipal census population of 11,750.

In the 2016 Census of Population conducted by Statistics Canada, Mackenzie County had a population of 11,171 living in 3,088 of its 3,567 total private dwellings, a change of 2.2% from its 2011 population of 10,927. With a land area of 80,458.19 km^{2} (31,065.08 sq mi), it had a population density of 0.1/km^{2} (0.4/sq mi) in 2016.

== Attractions ==
Mackenzie County is home to Caribou Mountains Wildland Provincial Park and Hay-Zama Lakes Wildland Provincial Park. It is also adjacent to Wood Buffalo National Park to the east.

== See also ==
- List of communities in Alberta
- Specialized municipalities of Alberta
