= Zama Lake =

Lake in Mackenzie County, Alberta, Canada

- Location of Zama Lake in Alberta
- Location: Mackenzie County, Alberta
- Coordinates: 58°45′N 119°05′W
- Primary outflows: Hay River
- Basin countries: Canada
- Max. length: 35 km (22 mi)
- Max. width: 8 km (5.0 mi)
- Surface area: 55 km^{2} (21 sq mi)
- Surface elevation: 320 m (1,050 ft)
- Settlements: Zama City

Zama Lake is a large lake in Mackenzie County, in north-western Alberta, Canada.

Major Ernest Wilson Hubbell, Chief Inspector of the Dominion Land Survey, recorded the name "Zammah River" in his field notes as the transliteration of the name of a Slavey Chief (Slavey Indians are now known as the Dene Tha' First Nation). The Geographic Board of Canada recorded the name "Zama River" on 4 July 1922 without explanation for the spelling change. The lake seems to be named in the same fashion and was named on 6 November 1944. The Dene Tha' do not use the name "Zama Lake", but use names in the Slavey language to identify the lake; some use K’ah Woti Túé (“Main Blind Lake” referring to a hunting blind) and others use Tulonh Mieh (“Where the Water Ends”).

The lake is located approximately 25 kilometres (16 mi) northeast of Rainbow Lake and 115 kilometres (71 mi) west northwest of High Level, at the confluence of Zama River and Hay River. The lake covers 55 km^{2} (21 sq mi) and forms an intricate river, lakes, and wetland system. The Hay-Zama Lakes complex is a Ramsar site that is important for spring and fall migrating ducks and geese. As many as 250,000 ducks and geese use the lakes during the fall migration.

A small hamlet, Zama City is located approximately 50 kilometres (31 mi) north of the lake and the unincorporated community of Chateh in the Hay Lake 209 Indian reserve of the Dene Tha' First Nation is also located south of the lake.
