= Bistcho Lake =

Lake in Alberta, Canada

- Location within Alberta
- Location: Mackenzie County, Alberta
- Coordinates: 59°44′33″N 118°50′42″W
- Primary outflows: Petitot River
- Basin countries: Canada
- Surface area: 413 km^{2} (159 sq mi)
- Average depth: 0.7 m (2.3 ft)
- Max. depth: 6.7 m (22 ft)
- Surface elevation: 552 m (1,811 ft)

Bistcho Lake is a large lake in northwestern Alberta, Canada.

Bistcho Lake has a total area of 413 km^{2} (159 sq mi) (with 13 km^{2} (5.0 sq mi) islands area and 413 km^{2} (159 sq mi) water surface), and lies at an elevation of 552 m (1,811 ft). It is the third largest lake in Alberta.

Bistcho Lake is located in the hydrographic basin of the Liard River, with which it is connected by the Petitot River. The waters of the lake drain into the Arctic Ocean through the Petitot, Liard and Mackenzie River.

The Jackfish Point and Bistcho Lake indian reserves of the Dene Tha' First Nation are established on the southern shore of the lake.

In May of 2021 the Dene Tha' First Nation formally proposed an Indigenous Protected and Conserved Area (IPCA) that would be centred on the lake but include much of the northwestern corner of Alberta. In preparation for the proposed IPCA, the First Nation did extensive archaeological surveys of the shores of the lake, demonstrating continuous use of the lake by indigenous hunters and fishers for thousands of years.

== See also ==
- List of lakes in Alberta
