= Zama Lake 210 =

Coordinates: 58°44′29″N 119°15′24″W

- Indian reserve
- Zama Lake Indian Reserve No. 210
- Location in Alberta
- First Nation: Dene Tha'
- Treaty: 8
- Country: Canada
- Province: Alberta
- Specialized municipality: Mackenzie

Area
  - Total: 23.744 km^{2} (9.168 sq mi)
- Time zone: UTC−06:00 (Alberta Time)

Zama Lake 210 is an Indian reserve of the Dene Tha' First Nation in Alberta, located within Mackenzie County. It is west of Zama Lake.
