= Mountain Lake cluster =

Two diatremes in Alaska

Location of the Mountain Lake cluster in north-central Alberta, Canada.

The Mountain Lake cluster consists of two diatremes or volcanic pipes in Northern Alberta, Canada. It was emplaced during a period of kimberlite volcanism in the Late Cretaceous epoch.

Although they were originally described as kimberlite or kimberlitic, the Mountain Lake (ML) rocks were later reclassified as alkaline ultramafic volcanics, hybrid alkaline ultramafic rocks, basanite or alkali olivine basalt. Due to extensive clay alteration that obliterated much of their original mineralogy, the question of their proper classification remains unsettled.

== Location and geological setting ==
The ML pipes form part of the Northern Alberta kimberlite province, along with the nearby Birch Mountains kimberlite field and the Buffalo Head Hills kimberlite field. They were discovered in 1989-90 just north of Mountain Lake (55.456291n 117.714510w), which lies about 75 km (47 mi) northeast of Grande Prairie, Alberta. The ML south pipe measures 400 m (1,300 ft) by 650 m (2,130 ft), covering an area of 29 hectares (72 acres), and the north pipe measures 250 m (820 ft) by 350 m (1,150 ft), covering an area of 8.75 ha (21.6 acres).

The ML pipes are hosted within the nonmarine sedimentary rocks of the Wapiti Formation and were erupted onto an inland alluvial plain. The uppermost strata of the Wapiti have been removed by erosion in the area, and most of the bedrock is covered by glacial and post-glacial sediments of Quaternary age. The ML volcaniclastic rocks are more resistant to erosion than the surrounding Wapiti Formation rocks, so the ML cluster forms a small hill.

== Age ==
Fossil pollen grains from mudstone clasts and laminated lacustrine sediments interbedded with the ML rocks are consistent with an emplacement age of from 68 to 76 Ma (million years ago), or the Campanian to early Maastrichtian stage of the Late Cretaceous. Fission track dating of apatite gives ages of 72 to 78 Ma. Magnetostratigraphic polarity determinations, coupled with the palynostratigraphic results and radiometric dates, indicate that the ML rocks are not older than 79.1 Ma.

== Lithology and mineralogy ==
The ML cluster consists of volcaniclastic rocks that are interpreted as representing volcanic crater or diatreme deposits. They include euhedral to broken and pellet-shaped grains of olivine that are supported in a fine-grained groundmass, along with xenoliths derived from sedimentary rocks, crystalline Precambrian rocks, and a variety of types of volcanic rocks. In many examples both the olivine and the groundmass have been totally altered to smectite clay, and in some specimens the clay has been further altered to zeolite minerals and quartz. Although they include diamond indicator minerals such as chromite and several types of garnet (G5, G9, G11 and spessartine), the ML rocks are not considered to have a high potential for diamonds.

== See also ==
- Volcanism of Western Canada
