= Hay-Zama Lakes Wildland Provincial Park =

Wetland and wildland park in Alberta, Canada

Hay-Zama Lakes
- IUCN category Ib (wilderness area)
- Location within Alberta
- Location: Mackenzie County, Alberta, Canada
- Nearest city: High Level, Alberta
- Coordinates: 58°30′0″N 119°0′0″W
- Area: 586 km^{2} (226 sq mi)

Ramsar Wetland
- Designated: 24 May 1982
- Reference no.: 242

Hay-Zama Lakes is a 586-square-kilometre (226 sq mi) inland wetland and wildland park in northwestern Alberta, Canada. It was designated a Ramsar wetland of international importance on May 24, 1982, and is recognized as an Important Bird Area. It "constitutes one of the most extensive sedge wetlands in western North America".

The site has been under consideration for classification as a World Heritage Site. It is approximately 100 km (62 mi) west-northwest of the town of High Level, 140 kilometres (87 mi) from the border with the Northwest Territories.

It is "twinned" with the Dalai Lake National Nature Reserve in Inner Mongolia, China.

== Geography ==
An expansive lowland wetland complex, the system consists of eutrophic freshwater lakes, and the floodplains and interior river deltas associated with the Peace River. It is at an elevation of 320 metres (1,050 ft) above sea level.

Water levels are determined by seasonal and annual fluctuations, which may be quite significant. Inflow from the Hay River greatly influences both the size of the lakes and their depth. The largest lake in the system is Zama Lake.

The site has been subject to continuous oil and natural gas extraction and exploration since the 1960s, and is surrounded by degraded landscape as a result. In an agreement between the Dene Tha' First Nation and oil production and exploration companies operating in the wetland complex, no new wells will be built from 2007 onward, and complete cessation of such activities will occur no later than 2017.

== Fauna ==
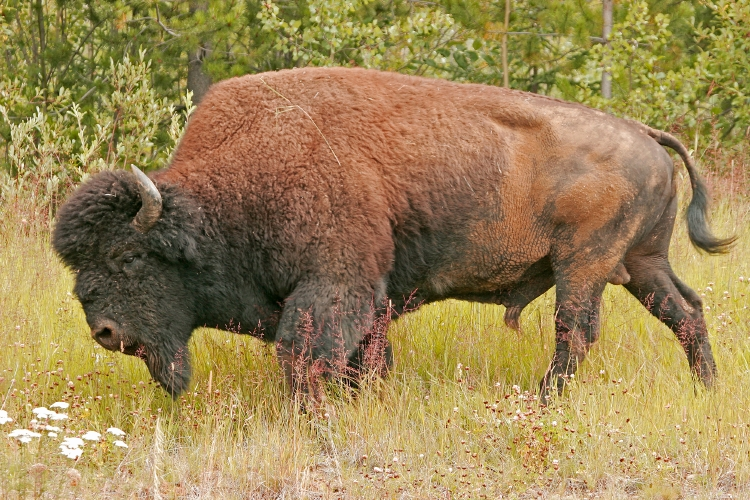
Wood Bison

The complex is site to large populations of migratory birds during spring and fall migrations. Over 250,000 ducks and 177,000 geese have been observed during a single migration. It lies on the path of three waterfowl flyways, the Pacific, Central and Mississippi, making it an important moulting and staging area for numerous waterfowl species, the primary factor leading to its Ramsar designation.

It is the only site in Alberta targeted for the re-introduction of Wood Bison, which thrive on a winter forage of sedges and grasses indigenous to the area. A group of 24 bison were first introduced to Hay-Zama Lakes Wildland Park in 1984, moved from Elk Island National Park, and its population has steadily grown to 700 members. The bison, however, have been following "roads opened up for them by oil and gas activity", straying toward the town of High Level, attracted by roadside grasses. Concern about contact between this group and bison from Wood Buffalo National Park, which carry brucellosis or tuberculosis, has led to the granting of permits to Dene Tha' hunters to cull straying animals to prevent the spread of disease into the Hay-Zama herd.
