= Meander River, Alberta =

Meander River
- Settlement
- Location of Meander River in Alberta
- Coordinates: 59°02′0″N 117°42′0″W
- Country: Canada
- Province: Alberta
- Region: Northern Alberta
- Census division: No. 17
- Indian reserve: Upper Hay River 212
- Elevation: 328 m (1,076 ft)
- Time zone: UTC−06:00 (Alberta Time)
- Highways: Alberta Highway 35

Meander River, is a settlement in Upper Hay River 212, a part of the Dene Tha' Band, in northern Alberta, Canada. It located on Highway 35 (the Mackenzie Highway) and acts as a highway service centre between Alberta and the Northwest Territories.

== Geography ==
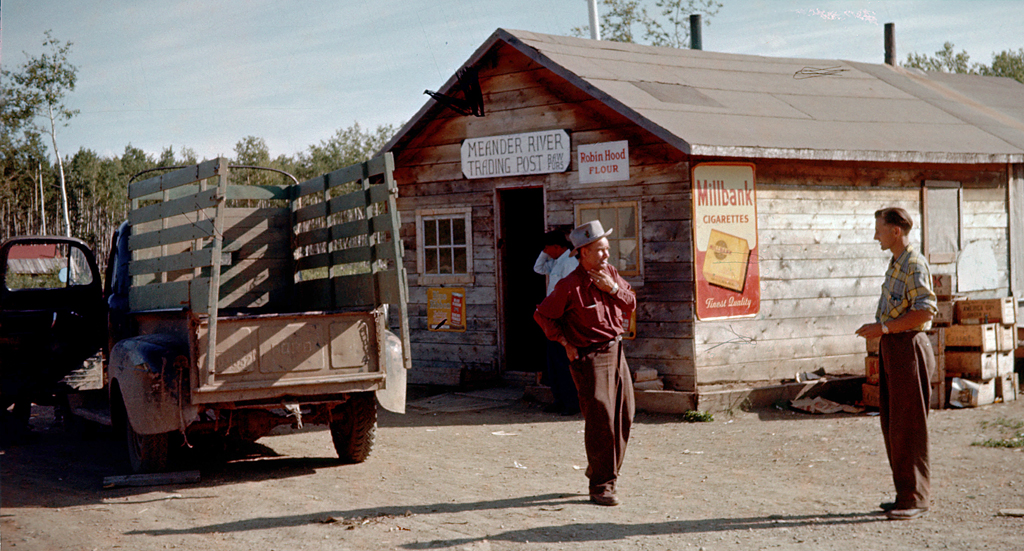
The Meander River Trading Post in 1956

The settlement is located on the banks of the Hay River, at an elevation of 328 meters (1,076 ft). The plant hardiness zone of Meander River is 0B, the second lowest possible within Canada, due primarily to its northern latitude.

== Employment ==
A major source of employment for Meander River is available via commute to High Level, approximately 70 km (43 mi) to the south along Highway 35. Other sources of employment within the community include a provincially funded school built in 1996 and a Dene Tha' Band office.

== Infrastructure ==
The community is connected to the internet via Alberta SuperNet with fibre optic cabling.

Two FM Radio stations are broadcast to the reserve, CFWE 89.9 FM and CIAM 92.3 FM.

There is one school in Meander River, Upper Hay River School.

Medical care is provided by the Meander River Health Station.

== Recreation ==
- recreational hockey/ball hockey league
- recreational volleyball league
- cross-country skiing
- snowmobiling
- canoeing
- hunting
- fishing

== Religion ==
There is one church in Meander River, the Catholic Mission.
