= Dalai Lake National Nature Reserve =

Biosphere reserve in China

Coordinates: 48°58′23″N 117°26′08″E

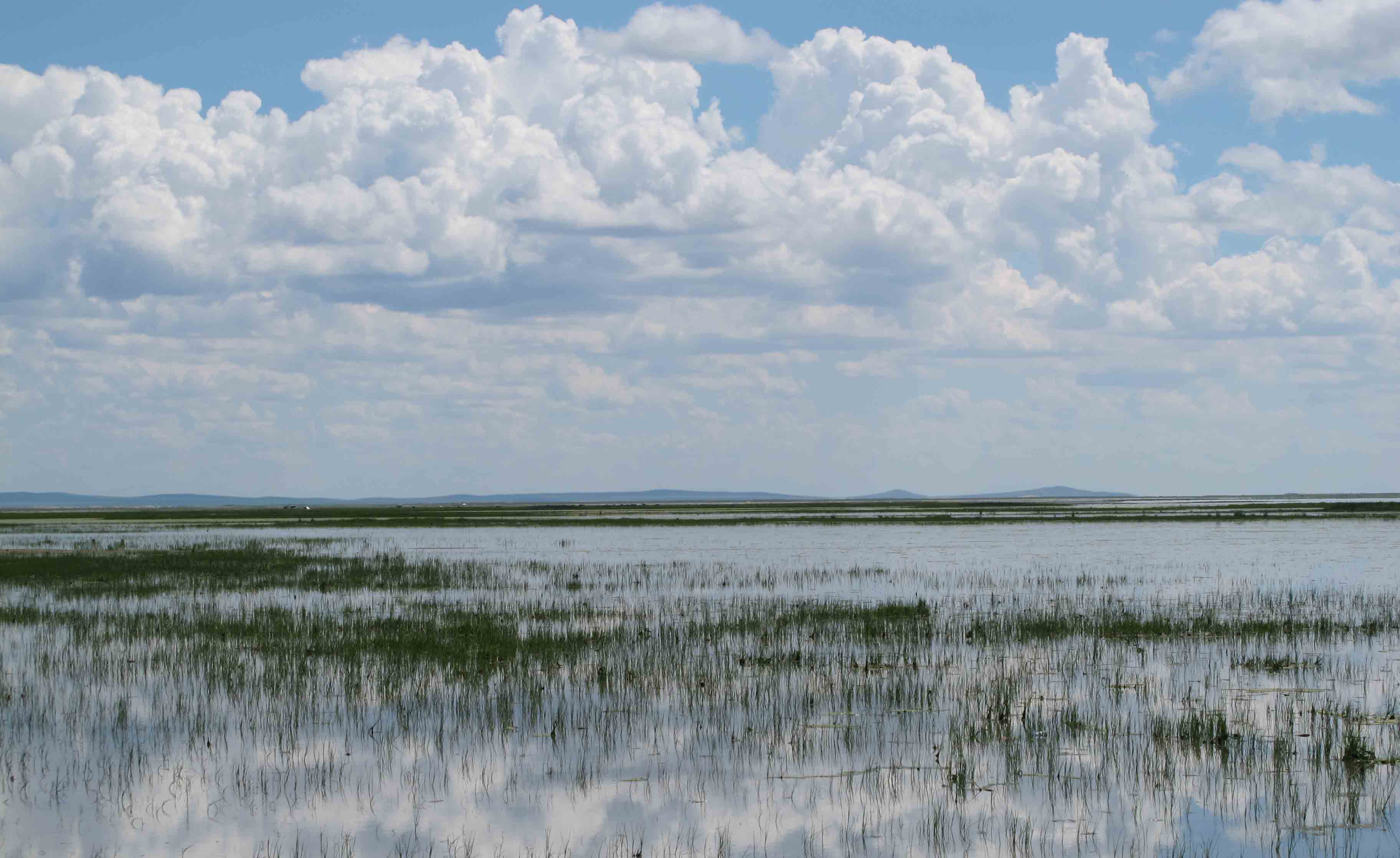
Panorama of the Dalai lake with reed beds

The Dalai Lake National Nature Reserve is a UNESCO biosphere reserve and a Ramsar site in Inner Mongolia, China. It encompasses the Dalai Lake (a.k.a. Hulun Lake) and its wetlands. It was established in 1986, and in 1992 it received the status of a national nature reserve. In 2002 in was included into the list of RAMSAR wetland sites.

Due to the similarity of its natural environment with the adjacent areas in the neighboring countries, in 1994 it was included into the Dauria International Protected Area.

It was "twinned" with the Hay-Zama Lakes Wildland Provincial Park, Canada.

== Geography ==
The reserve lies within the area between 47° 45' 50″ – 49° 20 20″ North latitude and 116° 50' 10″ – 118° 10' 10″ and borders with Russia in the north and Mongolia in the south. Its total area in 7,400 sq.km, with 46% occupied by wetlands.

It is located at the foothills of the Greater Khingan range (Daxinganling Mountains) on the Hulunbuir Plateau (Hulunbuir Grasslands).

Its southern edge is on the Buir nuur lake that straddles the border of China and Mongolia, The major rivers are Orshuun Gol (a distributary of Khalkh River) and Kherlen River. When the water level is high, then an outflow to the Hailar River opens. The area includes the third, small lake, Ulan nuur (Wulannoor) approximately between the Hulul and Buir, connected to Orshuun.

== Fauna ==
The most important fauna of the reserve include Purple heron, White-naped crane, Eurasian spoonbill, Mongolian gazelle.
