= Dene Thaʼ First Nation =

First Nation in Alberta, Canada

- Band No. 448
- People: South Slavey
- Treaty: Treaty 8
- Headquarters: Chateh
- Province: Alberta

Land
- Other reserves: Amber River 211; Bistcho Lake 213; Bushe River 207; Hay Lake 209; Jackfish Point 214; Upper Hay River 212; Zama Lake 210
- Land area: 300.38 km^{2} (115.98 sq mi)

Population (2019)
- On reserve: 2161
- Off reserve: 988
- Total population: 3149

Website
- denetha.ca

Dene / (~~Slavey~~) "people" / "Awokanak"
- Person: Dene
- People: Dene Thaʼ (Deneke)
- Language: Dene Yatié / Dene Zhatié
- Country: Dene Thaʼ Ndéh, Denendeh

The Dene Thaʼ (/'tɛnɛ ðɑː/) First Nation is a First Nations government of the South Slavey in Northern Alberta, Canada. The people call themselves Dene Dháa (sometimes spelled Dene Thá or Dene Thʼa) or 'Ordinary People' in the Dene Dháh language. Its population is centered primarily in three communities: Bushe River, Meander River, and Chateh (formerly known as Assumption), but approximately 600 members who live off-reserve. Dene Thá First Nation is Treaty 8 nation and a member of the North Peace Tribal Council.

== Territories ==
The following areas are reserved for the Dene Thá: Amber River 211, Bistcho Lake 213, Bushe River 207, Hay Lake 209, Jackfish Point 214, Upper Hay River 212, and Zama Lake 210 The total area of the reserves is 74,224 acres (30,037 ha).

Until the 1950s, the Dene Thá lived a semi-nomadic lifestyle and hunted in their traditional territory, which included land in the northwestern corner of Alberta, the southern Northwest Territories, and the northeastern corner of British Columbia. Today, many live in permanent settlements in and around Bushe River, Meander River, and Chateh.

The Dene Thá First Nation signed Treaty 8 in 1900.

== Demographics ==
As of 2013 the First Nations registered population was 2871 with 2017 members living on reserves or crown land and 854 members living off reserve.

== Language ==
Dene Dháh (/'dɛnɛ ðɑh/) translates to 'Dene language' is the preferred name for the language spoken by the Dene Thá, but linguists and anthropologists commonly refer to the language simply as a dialect of South Slavey. It has been called Slavey, South Slavey, Alberta Slavey, and Dene, a catch-all term which encompasses several Northern Athabaskan language groups.

Dene Dháh, the only variety of South Slavey spoken in Alberta (Dene Zhatié is spoken in the Northwest Territories), belongs to the Northern Athabaskan subgrouping of the Athabaskan language family. It is closely related to languages such as Dane-Zaa, Kaska, Dëne Sųłiné, and Tłı̨chǫ Yatıì.

=== Dialects ===
Dene Dháh has three distinct dialects:

- Xewónst’e (Fort Vermilion-Eleske)
- Xewónht’e (Assumption-Habay)
- Kegúnht’u (Bistcho Lake)

Each dialect name translates to "It's like that" and exhibits variation typical of the dialects.

=== Linguistic vitality ===
Most Dene Dháa adults speak Dene Dháh as their first language, and the language is still being passed on to children. In 2006, a survey conducted among school-aged children in Chateh reported a native-speaker proficiency rate of 65%.

== Naming Practices ==
With most Dene Thaʼ speaking their native language as well as some degree of English, Dene Thaʼ individuals tend to have two names: a Dene name and an English name.

Prior to the arrival of missionaries, it's said by the Dene Thaʼ that folks only had one name chosen by the elders, with surnames only existing for an invidviual until children came of age. At this point, children took the names of the first animals they killed, their behavior, or whatever parents called them.

== Previous Nomadism ==
The Dene Tha in times back, like many first nations of Canada, were nomadic. Using teams of sled dogs to move things between sites, Dene Thaʼ elders report that they seasonally moved between Tu Lonh (End of the Water) to Long Lake (Now known primarily as Rainbow Lake), to Tamarack Hill, to Tsa Zaghe (commonly known as Beaver Creek) and then back to Tu Lonh in a circular pattern for successful hunting. This nomadism was supplemented with cabins, camping spots, and occasional settlement sites used temporarily. With the establishment of Hudson's Bay Company trading posts, there was a gradual shift towards settling in semi-permanent log cabins among family groups circa the 1900s. Only relatively recently has a sedentary lifestyle been taken up by the Dene Thaʼ.

Many modern Albertan roads are previous Dene Thaʼ trails, such as the road near Habay.

== Spirituality, the "Dene Tha Way," and Religion ==
Spirituality permeates Dene Thaʼ culture, with various rituals covering virtually every facet of life. An important ritual for them is the Tea Dance (First Nations) (called "Dahot s’ethe"), which they undergo for reasons revealed to a local spiritual leader in their dreams. Common reasons are to ask for a good hunting season, ask for good weather, commemorate a tribal meeting, or as part of a burial ceremony. These dances are regularly held aside the Meander and Chateh rivers.

The Anthropologist Jean-Guy Goulet conducted fieldwork with the Dene Thaʼ for twelve years, publishing an account of their society in his book, Ways of Knowing: Experience, Knowledge, and Power Among the Dene Tha, published in 1998. In the book, he goes in-depth over a unique epistemological framework that many of the Dene Thaʼ he spoke to held called simply, "The Dene Tha Way." In this epistemology, the Dene Thaʼ gained experience through personal interactions, observing animals, people, and the weather directly to listen to them while in the same situation as they.Mental concentration is also used to gain new insights while dreams are considered to be visits to locations accessible without bringing along the body and where human and animal spirits can dwell. Goulet does not consider this a type of religion, however, instead he described it as a full-sensory understanding of the land.

These worlds are referred to by Goulet (informed by his anthropological research) as ndahdi-geh (our land) and ech'udigeh (the other land) which are also known as yake (heaven) and Ndahxota digeh (God's land). Elders called ndatin (dreamers) are able to leave their bodies to "follow a trail beyond the canopy of heaven" to commune with the deceased in these lands. Souls of the living are said to also be able to be lured away to these other worlds, either by enemies, deceased parents, animal helpers, or even leave on their own accord to follow the deceased. This luring of the soul is thought to bring illness which the ndatin (dreamers) can remedy through sending spiritual companions out to retrieve the souls. This, however, isn't believed to always be successful, with a fallback approach being to reincarnate the lured souls into a new form. This process of reincarnation is believed to also happen with those who have simply died, as the soul may decide against going to ech'udigeh (or made to by a dndatin) and, instead, enter a woman's womb to be reborn in ndahi-geh. Regardless, similarities in features between the dead and somebody born later are believed to be possible signs of reincarnation. Someone identified as a reincarnated soul can even be referred to in some way as their (perceived) previous self (for example, calling a daughter you believed to be your nephew reincarnated, "son"). Also of note, and not considered exclusive, is the fact that Dene Thaʼ children who die can be considered "angels," with it being possible for somebody to be considered reincarnated and an angel at the same time as the soul (something which cannot be seen) cannot be tracked like a physical object and, thusly, does not follow the same rules as physical objects.

Anthropologist Alice Beck Kehoe in her book Shamans and Religion: An Anthropological Exploration in Critical Thinking describes this as a process similar to a "Christians' sensitivity to what are interpreted as internal promptings from Jesus, a saint, or the Holy Spirit." Furthermore, she explains that such an understanding of the world through subliminal and non-human forces could increase the chance of survival due to the sheer number of natural forces around them which Dene Thaʼ must be sensitive to for survival. She describes this as a "cognitive structure" that allows the Dene Thaʼ to deal with tragedies in what is commonly referred to as Shamanism (however, she herself doesn't believe in the notion of shamanism as an overarching, cross-cultural system).

Dene Thaʼ belief is not a monolith, however, and the Dene Thaʼ who do not believe in the abilities of the powers and practices of the ndatin often refer to them as the "Dene wonlin edadih" (translated to English as, "someone who knows an animal helper" or "someone with power").

== Burials ==
Many Dene Thaʼ graves were originally located near the routes they travelled, however over time these sites have washed away due to a number of factors such as changing river currents and natural erosion. The act of adding grave markers to graves only began sometime within the last 150-200 years. Within the last 100 years, the Dene Thaʼ have begun placing small "spirit houses" atop a grave a year after burial in a practice likely introduced via the Cree. Previously, bodies were sometimes affixed in trees to be "taken" by birds, or placed in hollow logs when not buried in a simple canvas or tarp.
