= Zama City =

- Hamlet
- Location of Zama City in Alberta
- Coordinates: 59.15176°N 118.70590°W
- Country: Canada
- Province: Alberta
- Census division: No. 17
- Specialized municipality: Mackenzie County
- Foundation: 1966/1968

Government
  - Type: Unincorporated
  - Reeve: Peter F. Braun
  - Governing body: Mackenzie County Council: Jacquie Bateman; Peter F. Braun; Cameron Cardinal; David Driedger; Eric Jorgensen; Joshua Knelsen; Anthony Peters; Ernest Peters; Walter Sarapuk; Lisa Wardley

Area
  - Land: 21.68 km^{2} (8.37 sq mi)
- Elevation: 320 m (1,050 ft)

Population (2024)
  - Total: 50
  - Density: 2.4/km^{2} (6.2/sq mi)
- Time zone: UTC−06:00 (Alberta Time)

Zama City is a hamlet in northwestern Alberta, Canada within Mackenzie County. It is located north of Zama Lake along Zama Road, which branches off the Mackenzie Highway (Highway 35) approximately 80 kilometres (50 mi) north of High Level. The hamlet falls within Census Division No. 17 and the federal riding of Grande Prairie-Mackenzie.

== Toponymy ==
Zama City is named after the Zama Lake, which runs through wetlands approximately 30 km northwest of Zama City.

The river was referred to as Zammah River by Ernest Wilson Hubbell of the Dominion Land Survey in 1921. In 1922, Hubbell informed the Geographical Names Board of Canada that he had derived the word Zammah from a transliteration of a Dene Tha' First Nation Chief he had encountered during his survey. The board accepted the name, but altered the spelling to Zama for unknown reasons.

Dene Tha' identify the river as Kólaa Zahéh ("Old Man River"). This name is likely a reference to traditional creation myths, rather than the chief Hubbell described.

== Economy ==
=== Oil and gas ===
Zama City is the service centre for the Zama Oil Fields, described by Alberta Culture as "possibly the largest oil and gas field in the province" in 2012. As of 2025, the hamlet supports a transient workforce of up to 4,000 oil and gas personnel annually.

=== Commerce and services ===
Most lots in Zama City are zoned for small-scale urban farming, allowing residents to tend to a small number of livestock.

As of 2026, trucking companies deliver groceries and other items that cannot be sourced in Zama City to locals, and Canada Post services are available in the community hall. Water and sewage services are managed by Mackenzie County, and power through ATCO. Prescription medications are also delivered to locals from High Level once a week; for more complex medical assistance, residents must travel to High Level.

== History ==
=== Establishment: 1966-1970 ===
According to National Topographic System maps, no community existed in the area today known as Zama City in 1963. Permanent settlements were established after the first oil well in the vicinity was discovered in 1966; the community grew concurrently with the discovery of an additional 255 petroleum reservoirs throughout the rest of the decade. Texaco Canada was advertising for oil and gas personnel for the "Zama area to be based at... Zama City" as early as December 1967.

In these early years, Zama City was also known as "Cameron Corner" after an oil company active in the area. Its 'city hall' operated informally from the cabin of a resident, trapper Joe Martel. By 1969, the locality was recognized as Zama City by the Government of Alberta, with 200 residents recorded.

=== Development: 1971-2000 ===
A public library opened in Zama City in 1974, and a school opened by 1979, serving 32 students from kindergarten to Grade 9. Zama City became a hamlet on September 10, 1980.

In 1996, the Edmonton Journal described Zama City as having 400 permanent residents. Described as an "oil and gas servicing community," it was reported that Zama City lacked a paved road to the nearest primary highway, located 60 km from the settlement. Residents could only access the highway by driving on a thin gravel trail, operated by a local oil company.

=== 21st century: 2001-present ===
A Calgary Herald article on Zama City in 2003 reported that the hamlet, at that time, consisted of mobile homes and one permanent house. Zama City also contained a coffeehouse, general store, and a bar named PumpJacks.

After a pile of leftover sulphur caught fire at an Apache Corp gas plant near Zama City in August 2008, a state of emergency was declared in the hamlet, with 250 of its residents temporarily evacuated. The next year, locals cleared land around the community to slow the spread of a potential fire, as part of a planning program to prepare for the event of future emergencies. These preparations assisted firefighters after a lightning strike on June 21, 2012 caused a forest fire in the vicinity of Zama City. After the flames drew within 10 kilometres of Zama City, having spread across 100,000 hectares in less than a month, Zama City was evacuated on July 11. Firefighters gained control of the fire on July 20, allowing Zama City's 160 residents to return.

In October 2013, a leak developed in an above-ground section of an Apache Corp pipeline near Zama City, releasing 1.8 million litres of wastewater. Dene Tha' Chief, James Ahnassay, reported that "every plant and tree" touched by the leak died. The Alberta Energy Regulator laid charges against Apache Corp for failing to properly operate its pipeline. Apache Corp pleaded guilty in September 2016, admitting it had not installed an appropriate protective fence. Evidence suggested the spill occurred after a bison crushed the pipe. Apache Corp was ordered to pay damages of $350,000 for the Zama City spill and a second incident elsewhere in Alberta.

In 2017 and 2018, Zama City School received no students. After the Fort Vermilion School Division reported in 2019 that the community contained five children, who were home-schooled, Zama City School permanently closed. The building was sold to the Dene Tha' First Nation for a dollar in 2020.

A lightning strike in June 2022 sparked a wildfire near Zama City that was classified as "out of control" by Alberta Wildfire within the week, having grown to 3,000 hectares. This fire stopped short of posing a threat to the hamlet.

== Demographics ==
As of the 2024 Alberta municipal census, Zama City has a permanent population of 50 residents.

== Transportation ==
The two airstrips that served the community, Zama Airport and Zama Lake Airport, have been abandoned.

== In popular culture ==
- Turkish-American filmmaker, Hakan Sahin, shot two feature films in Zama City: Snow (2005) and Mirror (2003). Both works by Sahin, who worked in trucking for a time in Zama City, depict the experience of living in remote areas.
- Zama City features in the stage play, Bears (2018), by Matthew Mackenzie.
- Guitar Lessons, a 2022 movie starring Cree actor and comedian Conway Kootenay, was partially filmed in Zama City.

== See also ==
- List of communities in Alberta
- List of designated places in Alberta
- List of hamlets in Alberta
