= Buffalo Head Hills kimberlite field =

Cluster of volcanic pipes in Canada

Coordinates: 57.41686°N 115.91926°W

Location of the Buffalo Head Hills Kimberlite Field in north-central Alberta, Canada.

The Buffalo Head Hills kimberlite field is a group of kimberlitic volcanic pipes or diatremes in north-central Alberta, Canada. As of 2011, 41 kimberlite pipes, of which 28 are diamondiferous, had been identified in the field. They were emplaced during Late Cretaceous to early Paleocene time.

As of 2014 the Buffalo Head Hills field is in the exploration stage and has not gone into production. The highest grade kimberlite pipe (Pipe K252) has an estimated grade of 55 carats per hundred tonnes.

== Location ==
The Buffalo Head Hills (BHH) kimberlite field is part of the Northern Alberta kimberlite province, along with the Birch Mountains kimberlite field and the Mountain Lake cluster. It is located about 400 km (250 mi) north of the city of Edmonton in the Buffalo Head Hills of northern Alberta. The area lies within the Canadian boreal forest and is sparsely settled. Access is via Alberta Highway 88.

== Geologic setting ==
Deep beneath the BHH kimberlite field lies a 2.0 to 2.4 billion year old Precambrian craton called the Buffalo Head terrane, which has no exposure at surface. The Precambrian craton is overlain by about 1,600 m (5,200 ft) of Paleozoic and Mesozoic sedimentary rocks, which are covered by as much as 200 m (660 ft) of unconsolidated glacial and post-glacial sediments of Quaternary age. Because of this thick cover of Quaternary sediments and lack of bedrock outcrops, the BHH kimberlite pipes were discovered primarily through interpretation of geophysical data from aeromagnetic and gravity surveys, followed by drilling programs.

== Age ==
According to radiometric dating, the BHH kimberlite pipes were emplaced in two pulses, one between about 81 to 88 Ma (million years ago) during the Coniacian to Campanian Stages of the Late Cretaceous, and one between about 60 to 64 Ma in early Paleocene time. They were erupted into a near-shore setting in the Late Cretaceous Interior Seaway. Marine microfossils in mudstones that are interbedded with some of the kimberlite deposits are consistent with the Late Cretaceous age.

== Pyroclastic deposits ==
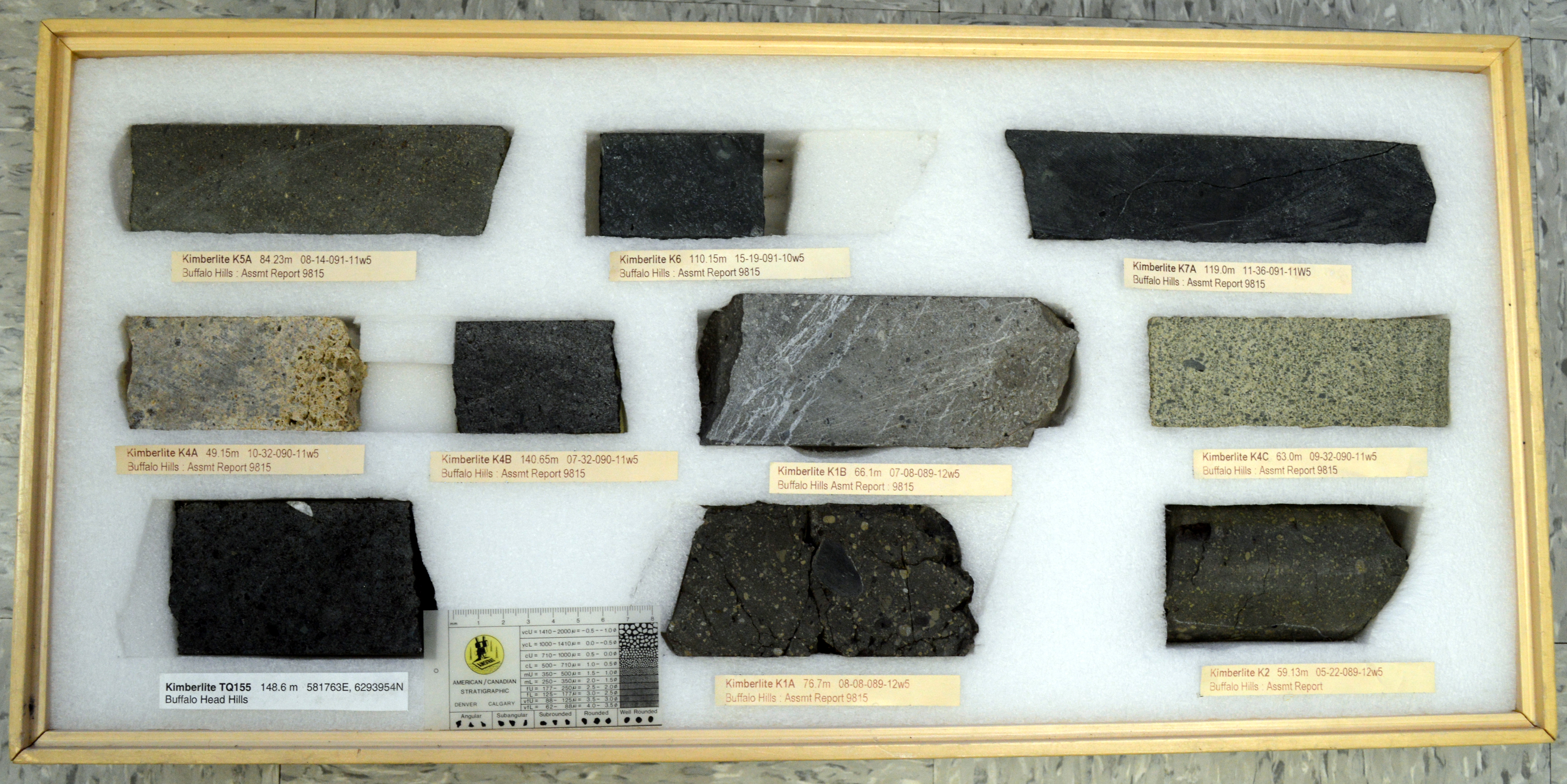
Kimberlitic rocks from the Buffalo Head Hills. Display by Alberta Geological Survey.

The BHH kimberlite pipes cover areas ranging from one to 47 hectares (120 acres). They represent maar-style volcanoes which have a vertical-walled volcanic crater of explosive origin, surrounded by a low rim of ejecta and filled with water. Pyroclastic fall and surge are the two volcanic mechanisms of deposition. There are also deposits formed by hydraulic reworking of kimberlite from tephra cones and/or extra-crater fall and surge deposits.

The pyroclastic fall deposits are poorly sorted and massive, while the surge deposits are better sorted, fine grained, and well bedded, with high bedding angles. The reworked kimberlite is well sorted, distinctly bedded, and contains abraded olivine grains. Multiple layers of pyroclastic and reworked kimberlite separated by layers of marine mudstone are present at some pipes. These represent a series of discrete kimberlite eruption events separated by quiescent periods during which the muds were deposited.

== Mineralogy and classification ==
The majority of the BHH kimberlites are diamondiferous, in contrast to those of the Birch Mountains kimberlite field to the northeast which are mostly barren of diamonds. Based on petrography and whole-rock geochemistry, the BHH pipes are classed as Group 1A kimberlites. They have a low carbonate content, low abundances of late-stage minerals such as phlogopite and ilmenite, and a high abundance of fresh, coarse olivine.

== Diamonds ==
Based on examination of more than 700 examples, the BHH diamonds range in color from colorless to yellow and brown, and most are transparent and colorless. The majority are sharp-edged octahedra, but ~45% were dodecahedral due to resorption of octahedra. Inclusions of garnet, olivine, clinopyroxene and rutile were found in a few specimens.

== See also ==
- Volcanism of Western Canada
- List of volcanoes in Canada
- List of volcanic fields
