= Bushe River 207 =

Coordinates: 58°28′29″N 116°59′36″W

- Indian reserve
- Bushe River Indian Reserve No. 207
- Location in Alberta
- First Nation: Dene Tha'
- Treaty: 8
- Country: Canada
- Province: Alberta
- Specialized municipality: Mackenzie

Area
  - Total: 11,167.5 ha (27,595 acres)

Population (2016)
  - Total: 503
  - Density: 4.50/km^{2} (11.7/sq mi)
- Time zone: UTC−06:00 (Alberta Time)

Bushe River 207 is an Indian reserve of the Dene Tha' First Nation in Alberta, located within Mackenzie County. To the west, it is adjacent to the town of High Level. In the 2016 Canadian Census, it recorded a population of 503 living in 134 of its 142 total private dwellings.
