= Hay River (Canada) =

River in Alberta and Northwest Territories, Canada

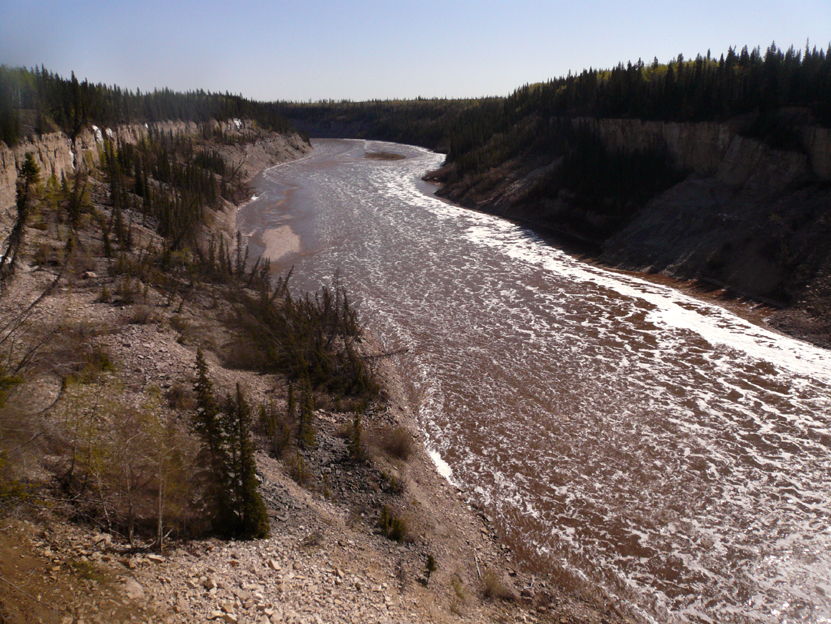
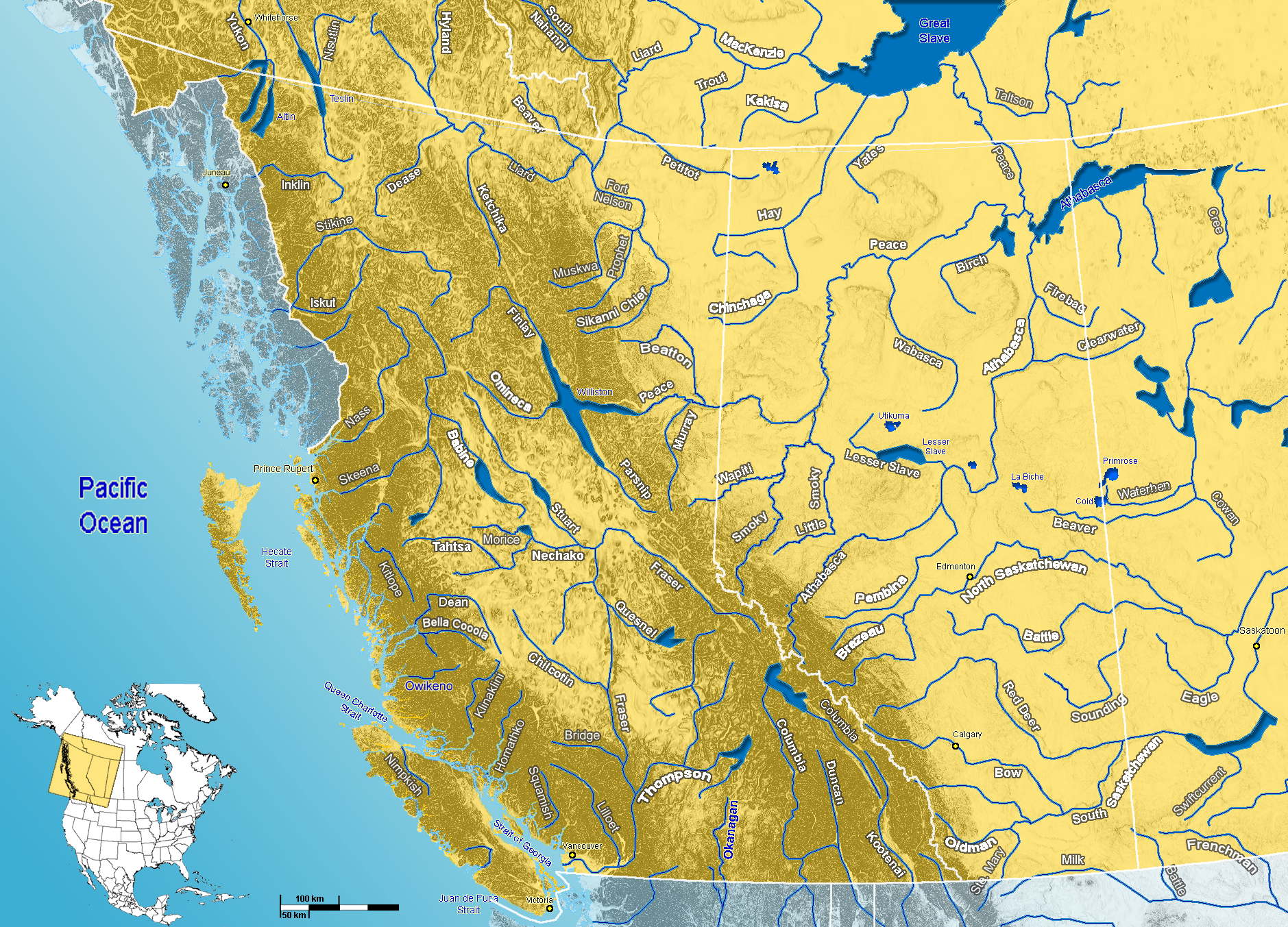
- Hay River

Location
- Country: Canada

Physical characteristics
- Source
  - location: Northern Alberta
  - coordinates: 58.08496°N 119.02201°W
  - elevation: 720 metres (2,360 ft)
- Mouth
  - location: Great Slave Lake at Hay River
  - coordinates: 60.86134°N 115.73290°W
  - elevation: 156 metres (512 ft)
- Length: 702 km (436 mi)
- Basin size: 48,200 km^{2} (18,600 sq mi)
- Discharge
  - average: 3,630,000 dam^{3} (2,940,000 acre⋅ft)

The Hay River (South Slavey: Kátå’odehche) is a large river in northern Alberta and southern Northwest Territories, Canada.

It originates in the muskeg of north western Alberta, flows west to British Columbia, then curves northward and returns to Alberta, where it follows a north-northeast course towards the Northwest Territories. After passing over two main waterfalls, the Alexandra Falls and Louise Falls, it flows through the town of Hay River and discharges into the Great Slave Lake. From there, its waters are carried to the Arctic Ocean by the Mackenzie River.

Hay River has a total length of 702 kilometres (436 mi) and a drainage area of 48,200 square kilometres (18,600 mi^{2}).

Tributaries of the Hay River are the Chinchaga River, Meander River (in South Slavey: Tahchee), Steen River, Melvin River and Little Hay River. The Hay River effectively flows through the Hay-Zama Lakes. Rainbow Lake is a widening of the river itself.

Communities in the Hay River basin include Rainbow Lake, Zama City, Steen River, Indian Cabins (in South Slavey: Dzêtú) in Alberta and Enterprise and the homonymous Hay River in the Northwest Territories. There are two first nations communities in the river basin: Chateh and Meander River.

At the Alberta – Northwest Territories border, the annual discharge is 3,630,000 cubic decametres (2,940,000 acre⋅ft).

== Tributaries ==
Alberta

- Rainbow Lake

British Columbia

- Little Buffalo River
  - Bivouac Creek
- Kotcho River

Alberta

  - Shekilie River
  - White Spruce Creek
  - Sahcho Creek
  - Townsoitoi Creek
- Little Hay River
  - Fire Creek
- Zama Lake
  - Sousa Creek
  - Moody Creek
  - Zama River
  - Omega River
  - Amber River
  - Mega River
  - Vardie River
- Adair Creek
- Chinchaga River
- Negus Creek
- Henderson Creek
- Meander River
- Adair Creek
- Melvin River
- Slavey Creek
- Roe River
- Lutose Creek
- Little Rapids Creek
- Steen River
- Dizzy Creek
- James Creek
  - Lessard Creek
- Jackpot Creek

Northwest Territories

- Swan Lake
- Goose Egg Lakes
- Swede Creek
- Twin Falls Creek

== See also ==
- List of rivers of Alberta
- List of rivers of the Northwest Territories
- List of longest rivers of Canada
