= Northern Alberta kimberlite province =

Three groups of volcanic pipes in Canada

Location of the northern Alberta kimberlite province.

The northern Alberta kimberlite province (NAKP) consists of three groups of diatremes or volcanic pipes in north-central Alberta, Canada, most of which are kimberlites and some of which are diamondiferous. They are called the Birch Mountains (BM), Buffalo Head Hills (BHH), and the Mountain Lake cluster (ML), and they were discovered between about 1990 and 1997. Most of the diatremes were emplaced during the Late Cretaceous Epoch (Turonian to Maastrichtian stages) although a few are as young as early Paleocene.

== Location ==
The NAKP kimberlite fields are located about 350 km (220 mi) to 450 km (280 mi) north to northwest of Edmonton in an area bounded by 55° and 57°N latitude and 115° and 118°W longitude. The area lies within the Canadian boreal forest and is sparsely settled. It includes the Buffalo Head Hills and the Birch Mountains, and is crossed by the Wabasca River and Alberta Highway 88.

== Geologic setting ==
The NAKP kimberlite fields are aligned along a northeast–southwest trend for a distance of about 350 km (220 mi), roughly subparallel to structural discontinuities called the Great Slave Lake Shear Zone to the north and the Snowbird Tectonic Zone to the south. They lie above or marginal to a 2.0 to 2.4 billion year old Precambrian craton called the Buffalo Head terrane, which has no surface exposure. Near the fields the Precambrian rocks are overlain by about 500 m (1,600 ft) to 2,200 m (7,200 ft) of Phanerozoic sedimentary rocks, and covered by unconsolidated glacial and post-glacial sediments.

== Lithology and mineralogy ==
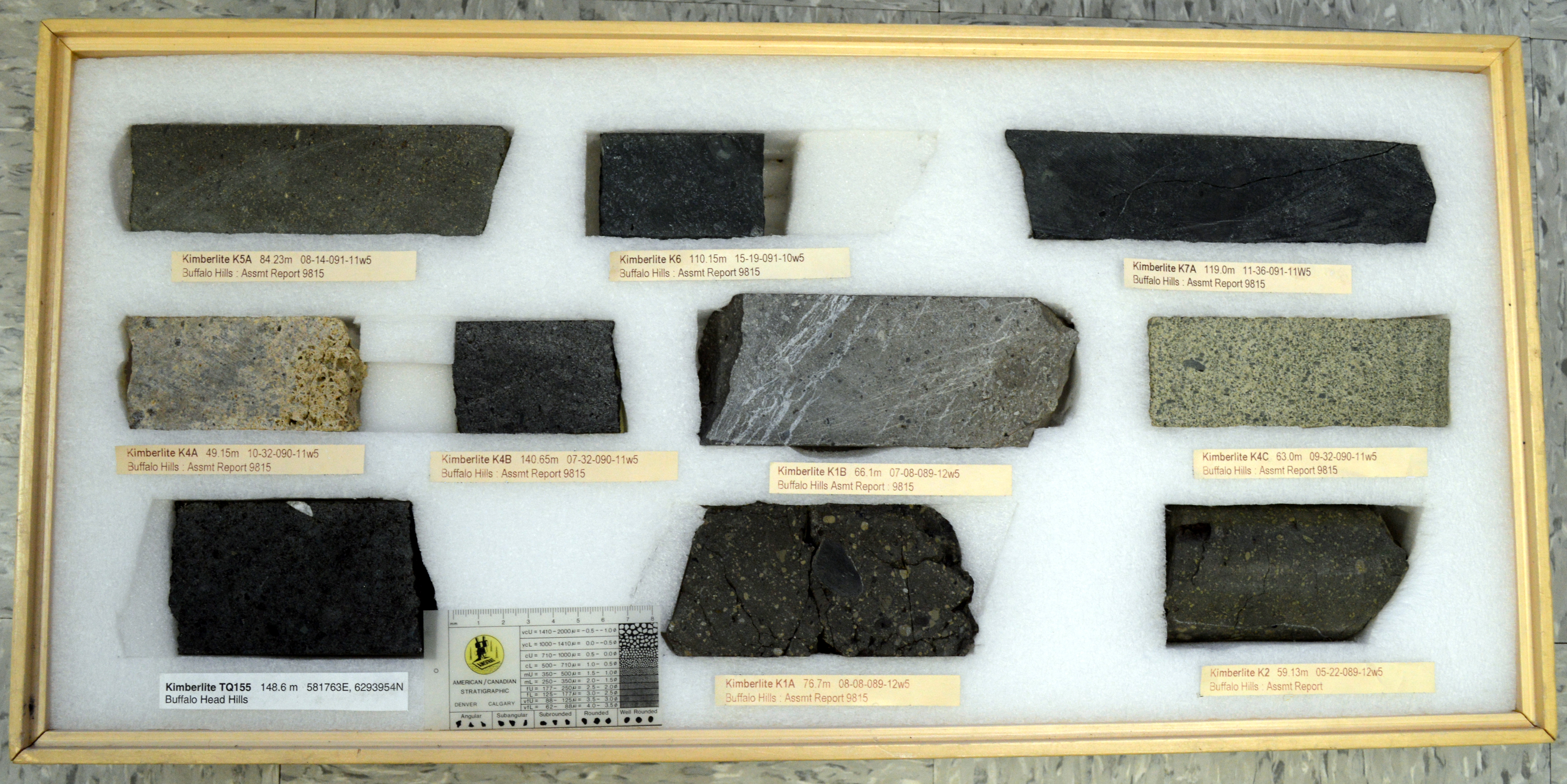
Kimberlitic rocks from the Buffalo Head Hills kimberlite field. Display by Alberta Geological Survey.

The volcanic rocks of the BHH and BM fields are classified as kimberlites. The ML rocks are not considered to be archetypal kimberilte and have been variously classified as alkaline ultramafic rocks, hybrid alkaline ultramafic rocks, alkali olivine basalt and basanite; they are difficult to classify because of strong clay alteration that has obliterated most of their original mineralogy.

All of the NAKP rocks are pyroclastic, and most represent maar-style diatremes that have a vertical-walled volcanic crater of explosive origin, surrounded by a low rim of ejecta. Pyroclastic fall and surge are the two volcanic mechanisms of deposition. There are also deposits formed by hydraulic reworking and resedimentation of material from tephra cones and/or extra-crater fall and surge deposits.

The NAKP volcanics, including the ML pipes, contain abundant lapilli and olivine supported in a fine-grained groundmass. Other minerals may include serpentine, clay minerals, carbonate minerals, phlogopite, ilmenite, perovskite, spinel, apatite, pyrite and, in some cases, diamonds.

== See also ==
- List of volcanoes in Canada
- Volcanism of Western Canada
