= Twinning (cooperation) =

Twinning is a form of legal or social agreement between two geographically and politically distinct localities or organizations for the purpose of promoting cultural and commercial ties. An early example was the concept of twin towns and sister cities. The concept was expanded to other types of international cooperation.

== European Union ==
Within the European Union, "Twinning" is an instrument for institutional cooperation between Public Administrations of EU Member States and of beneficiary or partner countries. As of 2023, the beneficiaries are Turkey, North Macedonia, Montenegro, Serbia, Albania, Bosnia and Herzegovina, Kosovo, Algeria, Armenia, Azerbaijan, Belarus, Egypt, Georgia, Israel, Jordan, Lebanon, Libya, Moldova, Morocco, Palestine, Syria, Tunisia and Ukraine, as well as partner countries and territories covered by the Directorate-General for International Partnerships (DG INTPA).

== Other ==
The Twinning agreement is established between the administrations of protected areas of Dalai Lake National Nature Reserve, China, and the Hay-Zama Lakes Wildland Provincial Park, Canada.
