= Caribou Mountains (Alberta) =

Mountain range in Alberta, Canada

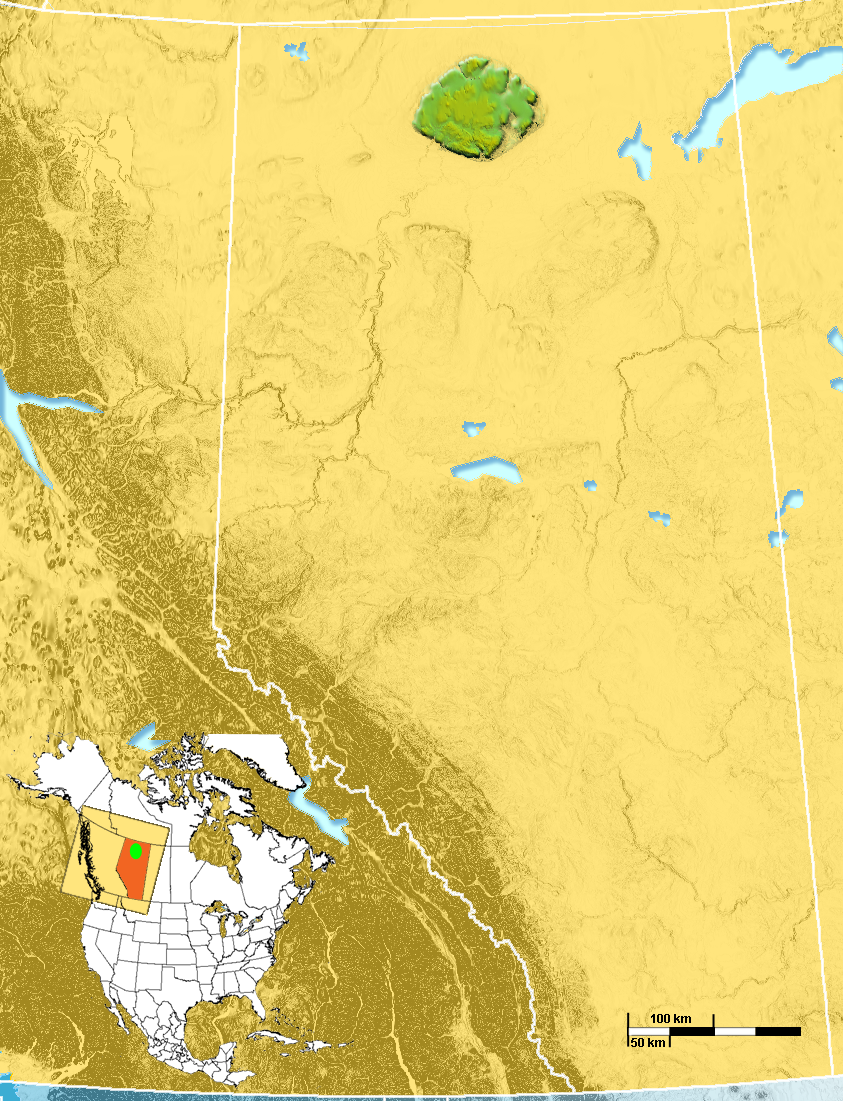
- Location of Caribou Mountains in Alberta

Highest point
- Elevation: 1,030 m (3,380 ft)
- Prominence: ≈700 m (2,300 ft)
- Coordinates: 59°11′32″N 115°35′33″W

Geography
- Location: Northern Alberta, Canada

The Caribou Mountains are a mountain range in Northern Alberta, Canada, surrounding a saucer-shaped elevated plateau that rises 700 m (2,300 ft) above the surrounding lowlands. The Caribou Mountains reach an elevation of up to 1,030 m (3,380 ft), making them the highest in northern Alberta. They rise north of the lower Peace River and are bounded to the north and east by Wood Buffalo National Park. The area was unglaciated during the last glacial period. The Caribou Mountains were affected by the 2024 Semo Lake Complex fire, which burned large portions of the plateau.

Because of their unique environment, the Caribou Mountains Wildland Park (5,910 km^{2} (2,280 sq mi)) was created in 2001 as part of the Special Places program. The largest provincial wildland park in the province, its fragile ecosystem contains sensitive wetlands, permafrost habitat and rich bird breeding habitat. "A population of up to 120 wood bison, an endangered species, lives in the Wentzel Lake area in small groups of up to 15 animals."

== Geography ==
The region is an upland region surrounded by lowlands, but both are forested and are considered part of the Boreal Plains Ecozone by the Commission for Environmental Cooperation and the Mid-Continental Canadian forests by the World Wildlife Fund.

== Ecology ==
Due to it being unchanged by the glaciers, the mountains have similar habitat to the arctic tundra further north, leading to it hosting a unique array of species not found in other parts of Alberta. The Caribou Mountains is the only location in Alberta where red-necked phalarope, grey-cheeked thrush, American tree sparrow, red-throated loon, and redpoll breed.

== Boreal woodland caribou ==
"The Park contains relatively undisturbed and lichen-rich forests, favoured habitat for woodland caribou. About 80 percent of the range of an important population of woodland caribou is contained within the Park, and about a third of Alberta's population of this threatened species is dependent on the Park."

== See also ==
- Mountains of Alberta
- Geography of Alberta
