= Amber River 211 =

Coordinates: 58°53′30″N 118°56′46″W

- Indian reserve
- Amber River Indian Reserve No. 211
- Location in Alberta
- First Nation: Dene Tha'
- Treaty: 8
- Country: Canada
- Province: Alberta
- Specialized municipality: Mackenzie

Area
  - Total: 2,332.3 ha (5,763 acres)
- Time zone: UTC−06:00 (Alberta Time)

Amber River 211 is an Indian reserve of the Dene Tha' First Nation in Alberta, located within Mackenzie County.
