= Rainbow Lake, Alberta =

Rainbow Lake
- Town
- Town of Rainbow Lake
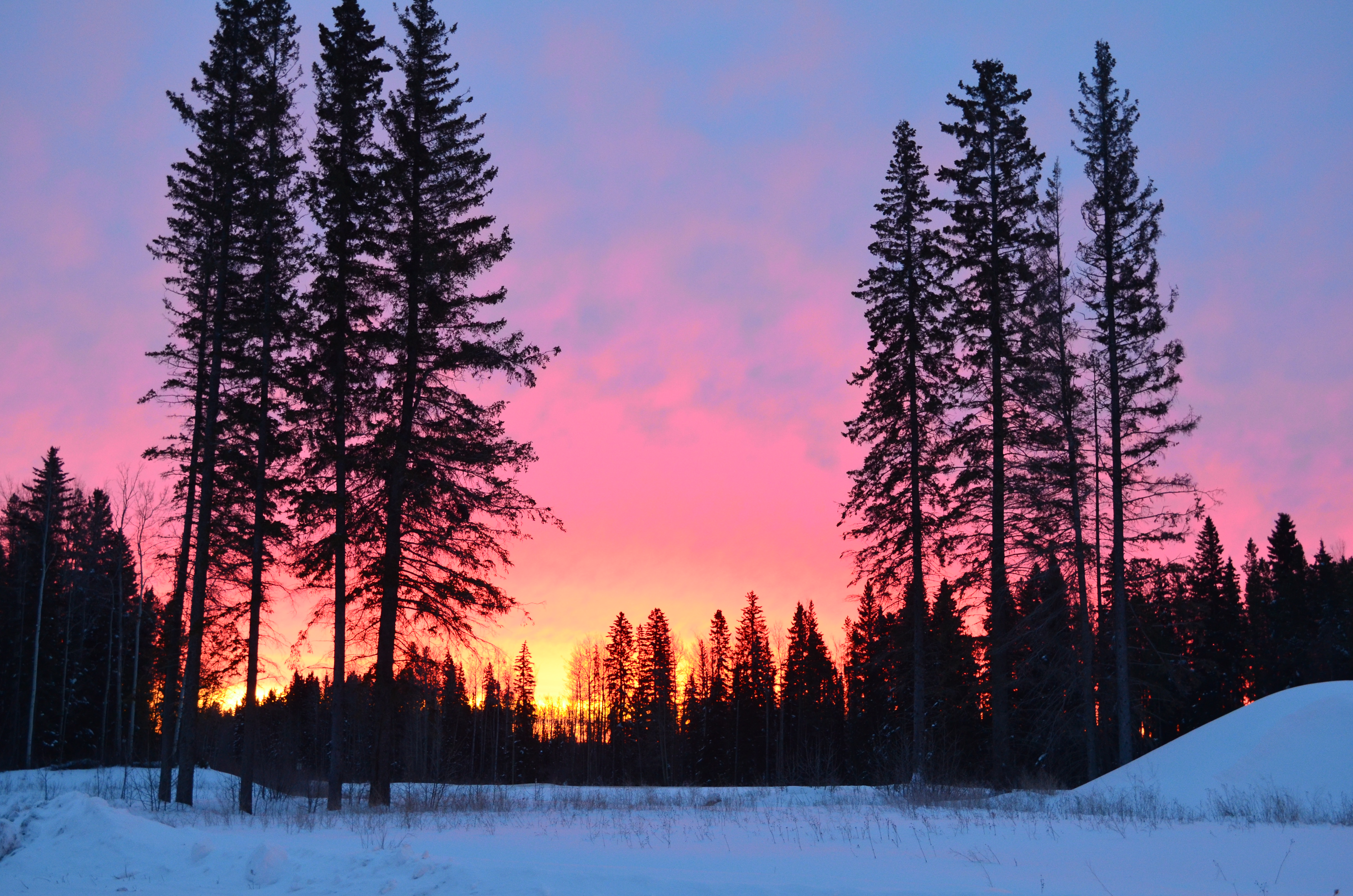
- Sunset at Rainbow Lake

- Location in Mackenzie County

- Location of Rainbow Lake in Alberta
- Coordinates: 58°30′0″N 119°22′59″W
- Country: Canada
- Province: Alberta
- Region: Northern Alberta
- Planning region: Lower Peace
- Specialized municipality: Mackenzie
- Incorporated
  - New town: September 1, 1966

Government
  - Mayor: Michelle Farris
  - Governing body: Rainbow Lake Town Council
  - MP: Chris Warkentin (Peace River-Cons)
  - MLA: Dan Williams (Peace River-Conservative)

Area (2021)
  - Land: 10.76 km^{2} (4.15 sq mi)
- Elevation: 534 m (1,752 ft)

Population (2021)
  - Total: 495
  - Density: 46/km^{2} (120/sq mi)
- Time zone: UTC−06:00 (Alberta Time)
- Postal code span: T0H
- Area code: +1-780
- Highways: 58
- Website: rainbowlake.ca

Rainbow Lake is a town in northwest Alberta, Canada. It is west of High Level at the end of Highway 58, in Mackenzie County.

The town carries the name of the nearby lake, formed on the Hay River, that was so called due to its curved shape.

The town was established to service the industry of the nearby oil field, discovered in 1965.

== Demographics ==
Federal census population history
Year	Pop.	±%
1971	355	—
1976	434	+22.3%
1981	504	+16.1%
1986	675	+33.9%
1991	817	+21.0%
1996	1,138	+39.3%
2001	976	−14.2%
2006	965	−1.1%
2011	870	−9.8%
2016	795	−8.6%
2021	495	−37.7%
Source: Statistics Canada

In the 2021 Census of Population conducted by Statistics Canada, the Town of Rainbow Lake had a population of 495 living in 204 of its 352 total private dwellings, a change of −37.7% from its 2016 population of 795. With a land area of 10.76 km^{2} (4.15 sq mi), it had a population density of 46.0/km^{2} (119.1/sq mi) in 2021.

In the 2016 Census of Population conducted by Statistics Canada, the Town of Rainbow Lake recorded a population of 795 living in 303 of its 475 total private dwellings, a change of −8.6% from its 2011 population of 870. With a land area of 10.76 km^{2} (4.15 sq mi), it had a population density of 73.9/km^{2} (191.4/sq mi) in 2016.

The population of the Town of Rainbow Lake according to its 2015 municipal census is 938, a change of −13.3% from its 2007 municipal census population of 1,082.

== Infrastructure ==
The community is served by the Rainbow Lake Airport (IATA: YOP, ICAO: CYOP), and is connected via Alberta Highway 58.

== Education ==
The town is home to the Rainbow Lake School operated by the Fort Vermilion School Division, which offers curriculum for kindergarten through grade 12.

== See also ==
- List of communities in Alberta
- List of towns in Alberta
