= Upper Hay River 212 =

Coordinates: 59°03′22″N 117°45′02″W

- Indian reserve
- Upper Hay River Indian Reserve No. 212
- Location in Alberta
- First Nation: Dene Tha'
- Treaty: 8
- Country: Canada
- Province: Alberta
- Specialized municipality: Mackenzie

Area
  - Total: 1,418 ha (3,500 acres)

Population (2016)
  - Total: 294
  - Density: 20.7/km^{2} (53.7/sq mi)
- Time zone: UTC−06:00 (Alberta Time)

Upper Hay River 212 is an Indian reserve of the Dene Tha' First Nation in Alberta, located within Mackenzie County. It is 80 kilometres northwest of High Level. In the 2016 Canadian Census, it recorded a population of 294 living in 98 of its 115 total private dwellings.
