= Petitot River =

Right tributary of the Liard River in Canada

Coordinates: 60°14′00″N 123°29′06″W

Petitot is a river in northern Alberta and British Columbia, as well as in southern Dehcho Region of the Northwest Territories of Canada. It is a tributary of the Liard River.

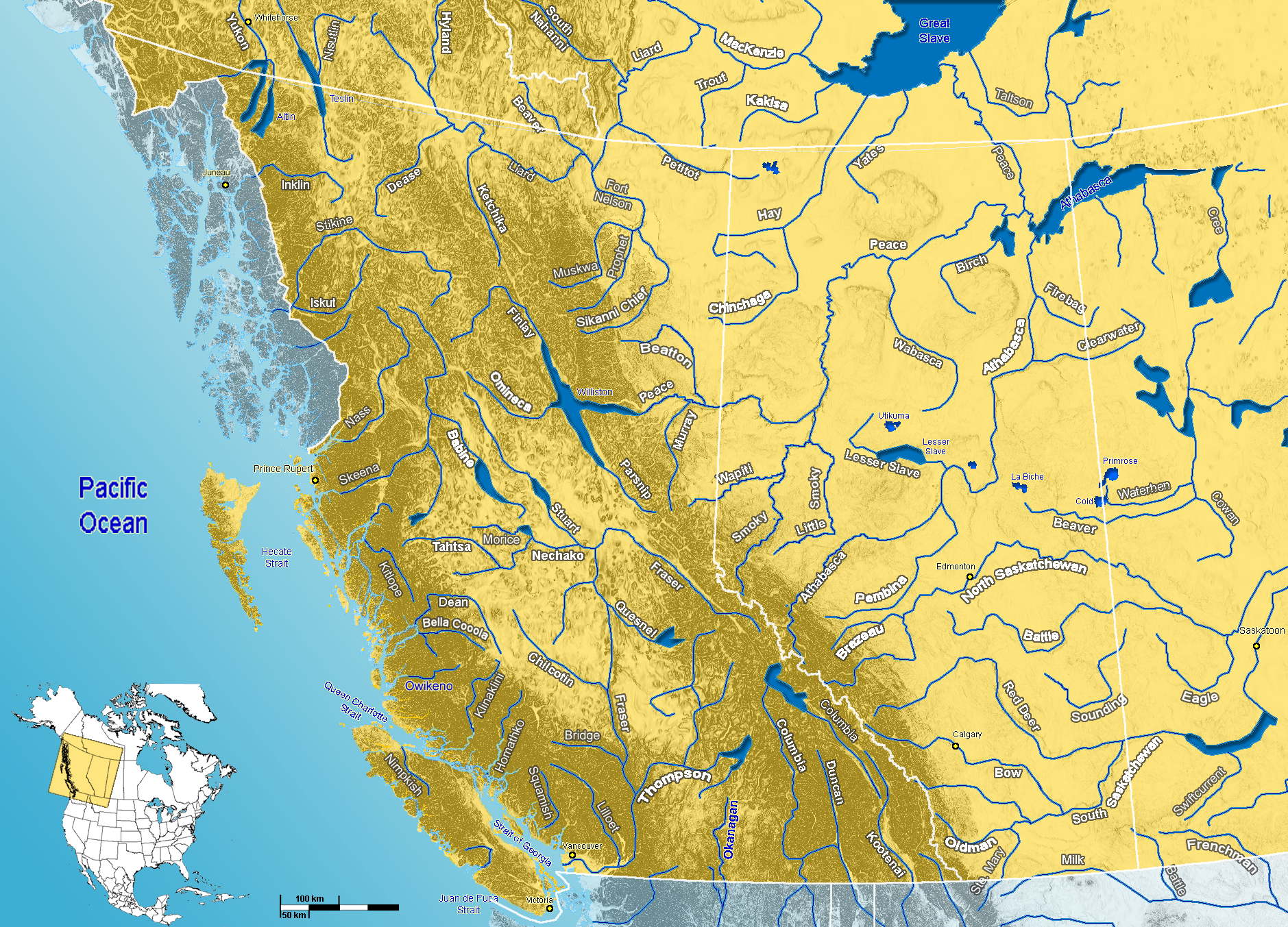
Petitot River in western Canada

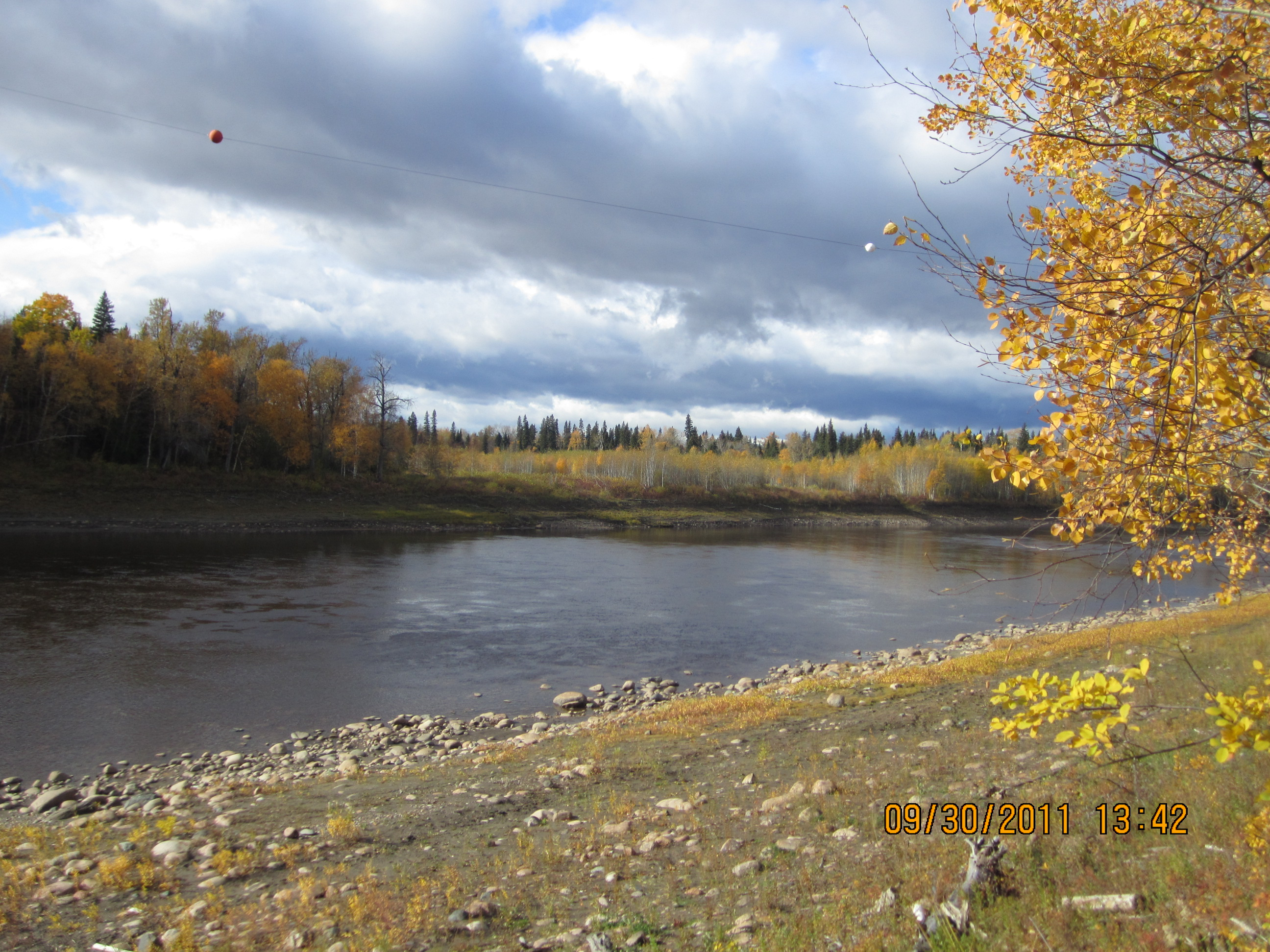
Petitot River looking toward the Liard River

Petitot River originates from Bistcho Lake in northwestern Alberta, and flows westwards along the northern borders of Alberta and British Columbia. It then passes in the Northwest Territories, where it discharges in the Liard River at the village of Fort Liard. From there, its waters are carried to the Arctic Ocean through the Mackenzie River.

The river takes its name from Father Émile Petitot, one of the first European to reach the area in 1867–68. The name in the Dene language of the Slavey First Nations is mbehcholah, "The Black".

It has a total length of 404 kilometres (251 mi) and a drainage area of 23,200 square kilometres (9,000 sq mi).

== Tributaries ==
- Thinahtea Lake Creek
- July Lake Creek
- Sahdoanah Creek
- Thetlaandoa Creek
- Tsea River
- Dilly Creek
- D'Easum Creek

== See also ==
- List of rivers of Alberta
- List of rivers of British Columbia
