= Chateh =

Unincorporated community in Alberta, Canada

Coordinates: 58°41′58″N 118°41′14″W

Location of Chateh, Alberta

Chateh is an unincorporated community in northern Alberta in Hay Lake I.R. 209, located 12 kilometres (7.5 mi) north of Highway 58, 91 kilometres (57 mi) northwest of High Level in Mackenzie County. It is also known as Assumption.

Mackenzie County is home to 12,804 people according to a 2021 population census. 3,229 of these people live in High Level, the most populous settlement of the county.

On May 13, 2023, the town was evactuated due to the ongoing 2023 Canadian wildfires, specifically the fire encroaching Long Lake.

Chateh is home to many historical buildings from its settlement in the early 1900s, when it served as a trading post for local indigenous communities. It was founded by a group of indigenous leaders who addressed the need for a gathering place for their communities.
