= Jackfish Point 214 =

Coordinates: 59°40′20″N 118°35′34″W

- Indian reserve
- Jackfish Point Indian Reserve No. 214
- Location in Alberta
- First Nation: Dene Tha'
- Treaty: 8
- Country: Canada
- Province: Alberta
- Specialized municipality: Mackenzie

Area
  - Total: 103.6 ha (256 acres)
- Time zone: UTC−06:00 (Alberta Time)

Jackfish Point 214 is an Indian reserve of the Dene Tha' First Nation in Alberta, located within Mackenzie County.
