= Northern Alberta =

Geographic region of Alberta, Canada

Coordinates: 57°N 115°W

- Geographic region
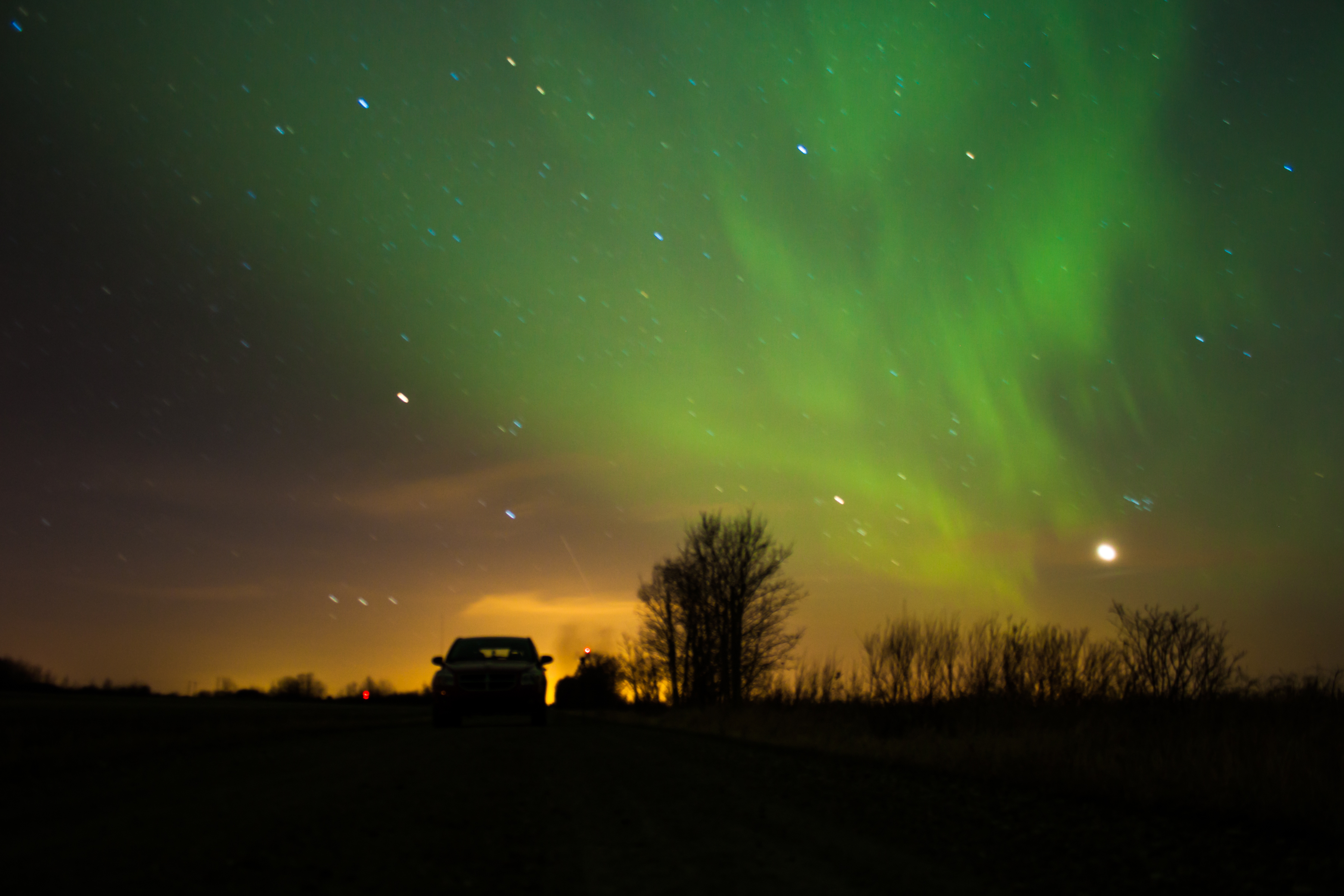
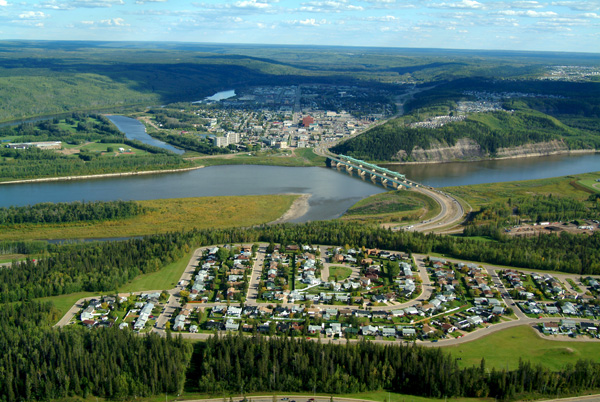
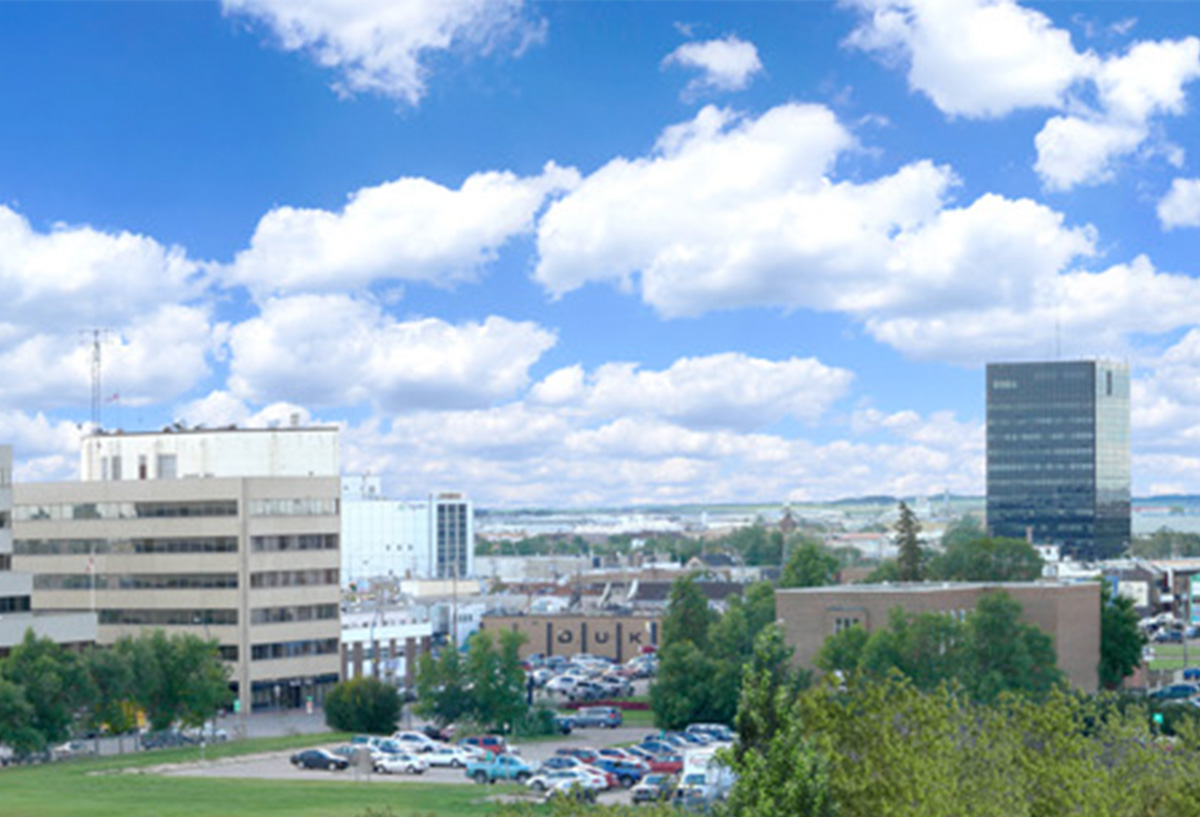
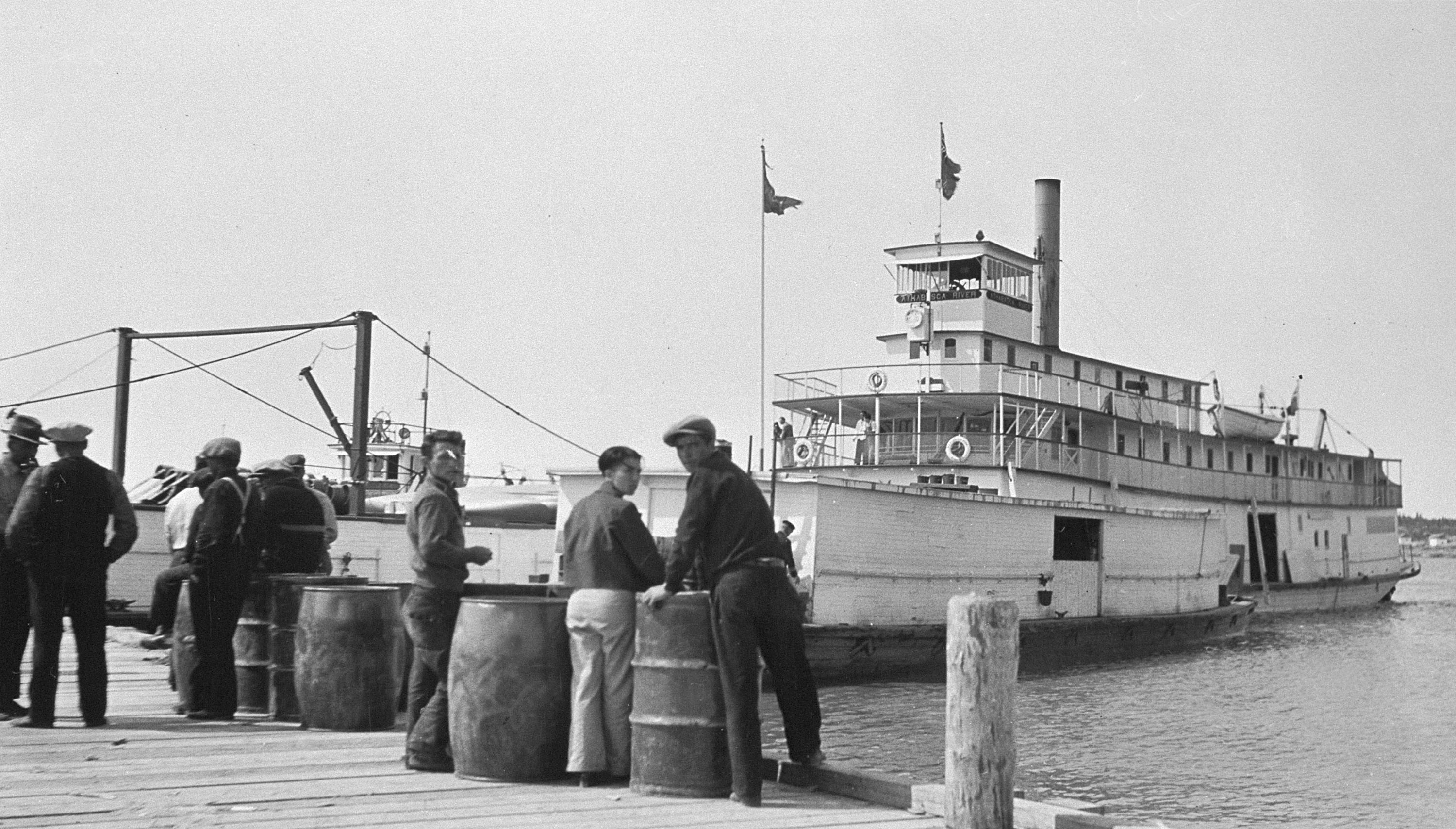
- Left-right from top: Aurora borealis, Fort McMurray and Grande Prairie skylines, Athabasca River paddlewheeler

- Northern Alberta Development Council area
- Largest population centres: Fort McMurray; Grande Prairie; Cold Lake; Whitecourt; Peace River; Slave Lake

Northern Alberta is a geographic region located in the Canadian province of Alberta.

An informally defined cultural region, the boundaries of Northern Alberta are not fixed. Under some schemes, the region encompasses everything north of the centre of the Calgary–Edmonton Corridor, including most of the province's landmass as well as its capital, Edmonton. Other schemes place Edmonton and its surrounding farmland in Central Alberta, limiting Northern Alberta to the northern half of the province, where forestry, oil, and gas are the dominant industries.

Its primary industry is oil and gas, with large heavy oil reserves being exploited at the Athabasca oil sands and Wabasca area in the east of the region. Natural gas is extracted in Peace region and Chinchaga-Rainbow areas in the west, and forestry and logging are also developed in the boreal forests of this region. As of 2023, the region had a population of approximately 374,572.

== Geography ==
Various definitions exist of Northern Alberta's boundaries. The definition used by the Northern Alberta Development Council, an agency of the provincial government, includes the communities of Whitecourt, Athabasca, Saddle Lake, St. Paul, and Cold Lake, while excluding Hinton, Edson, Mayerthorpe, and Westlock. This definition is also used by the University of Alberta to define eligibility for northern research grants.

The region consists of aspen parkland in the south, grading to boreal forest and muskeg in the north.

The southwest of the region is part of the Peace Country, an area that stretches into northeastern British Columbia consisting of fertile prairie, ranchland, and farmland along the Peace River and its tributaries.

Northern Alberta is crossed by the Peace River and the Athabasca River, both of which eventually convene to form the Slave River that ultimately drains into the Arctic Ocean via Great Slave Lake and the Mackenzie River within the Northwest Territories. Other major rivers are Wapiti, Smoky, Hay, Chinchaga, Petitot Rivers in the west, Wabasca River in the centre and Firebag, Beaver and Clearwater River in the east. Alberta's two largest waterbodies, Lake Athabasca and Lake Claire are located in the wetlands of northeastern Alberta, forming the Peace-Athabasca Delta, that drains through the Slave River towards the Arctic Ocean.

The Caribou Mountains are an elevated plateau in the relatively flat Albertan north which provide core habitat for an endangered woodland caribou herd. This area is conserved by the Caribou Mountains Wildland Park. The adjacent Wood Buffalo National Park is Canada's largest protected area.

Other tourist attractions in Northern Alberta include the Fort McMurray Historical Society-Heritage Park, Historic Dunvegan, Kimiwan Birdwalk and Interpretive Centre, Lesser Slave Lake Bird Observatory in the Lesser Slave Lake Provincial Park, Muskoseepi Park, Kakwa Wildland Provincial Park, Willmore Wilderness Park and the Oil Sands Discovery Centre.

Northern Alberta contains several diamond bearing diatremes associated with kimberlite fields, including the Buffalo Head Hills and Birch Mountains kimberlite fields which in turn form the Northern Alberta kimberlite province.

=== Fauna ===
Animals of Northern Alberta include the Mackenzie Valley gray wolf (Canis lupus occidentalis), British Columbian red fox (Vulpes vulpes abietorum), fishers (Pekania pennanti), American black bear (Ursus americanus), northwestern moose (Alces alces andersoni), white-tailed deer (Odocoileus virginianus), wood bison (Bison bison athabascae), groundhogs (Marmota monax canadensis), northern coyotes (Canis latrans incolatus), wolverines (Gulo gulo), and mountain lions (Puma concolor). Multiple elusive and out-of-range animals have been reported in this region, including a singular gray fox (Urocyon cinereoargenteus) was recorded close to Lake Athabasca, and multiple vagrant birds including northern cardinals (Cardinalis cardinalis), wandering tattlers (Tringa incana), and northern wheatears (Oenanthe oenanthe). Alberta also has reports of wild boars (Sus scrofa) coming into the province.

== Infrastructure ==
=== Transportation ===
Highway 43 and Highway 2 pass through the southwest of the region, this being the end of the CANAMEX corridor. Other important routes are the Mackenzie Highway and Bicentennial Highway in the northwest, the Northern Woods and Water Route in the southeast and Highway 63 in the east.

Grande Prairie Airport, Peace River Airport, Fort Vermilion (Wop May Memorial) International Airport and Fort McMurray Airport are regional air transportation hubs.

=== Health regions ===
Northern Alberta's health region is controlled by Alberta Health Services.

== Politics ==
On a provincial level, Northern Alberta is represented in the Legislative Assembly of Alberta by Members of the Legislative Assembly elected in the ridings of Athabasca-Redwater, Barrhead-Morinville-Westlock, Bonnyville-Cold Lake, Dunvegan-Central Peace, Fort McMurray-Conklin, Fort McMurray-Wood Buffalo, Grande Prairie Smoky, Grande Prairie Wapiti, Lac La Biche-St. Paul, Lesser Slave Lake, and Peace River.

== Communities ==
Cities

- Grande Prairie
- Cold Lake
- Fort McMurray

Towns

- Athabasca
- Beaverlodge
- Bonnyville
- Elk Point
- Fairview
- Falher
- Fox Creek
- Grande Cache
- Grimshaw
- High Level
- High Prairie
- Lac La Biche
- Manning
- McLennan
- Peace River
- Rainbow Lake
- Sexsmith
- Slave Lake
- Spirit River
- St. Paul
- Swan Hills
- Valleyview
- Wembley
- Whitecourt

Villages

- Berwyn
- Boyle
- Donnelly
- Girouxville
- Hines Creek
- Hythe
- Nampa
- Rycroft

Summer villages

- Bondiss
- Bonnyville Beach
- Island Lake
- Island Lake South
- Mewatha Beach
- South Baptiste
- Sunset Beach
- West Baptiste
- Whispering Hills

Specialized municipalities

- Lac La Biche County
  - Lac La Biche (urban service area)
- Mackenzie County
  - La Crete (hamlet)
- Regional Municipality of Wood Buffalo
  - Fort Chipewyan (hamlet)
  - Fort McMurray (urban service area)

Improvement districts

- Improvement District No. 24 (Wood Buffalo National Park)
- Improvement District No. 349

Municipal districts

- Athabasca County
- Big Lakes County
- Birch Hills County
- Clear Hills County
- M.D . of Bonnyville No.87
- M.D. of Fairview No. 136
- County of Grande Prairie No. 1,
  - Clairmont (hamlet)
- Greenview No. 16, M.D. of
  - Grande Cache (hamlet)
- Lesser Slave River No. 124, M.D. of
- Northern Lights, County of
- Northern Sunrise County
- Opportunity No. 17, M.D. of
  - Wabasca (hamlet)
- Peace No. 135, M.D. of
- Saddle Hills County
- County of St. Paul No. 19
- Smoky River No. 130, M.D. of
- Spirit River No. 133, M.D. of

== See also ==
- List of regions of Canada
