= Bistcho Lake 213 =

Coordinates: 59°38′16″N 118°27′27″W

- Indian reserve
- Bistcho Lake Indian Reserve No. 213
- Location in Alberta
- First Nation: Dene Tha'
- Treaty: 8
- Country: Canada
- Province: Alberta
- Specialized municipality: Mackenzie

Area
  - Total: 354.1 ha (875 acres)
- Time zone: UTC−06:00 (Alberta Time)

Bistcho Lake 213 is an Indian reserve of the Dene Tha' First Nation in Alberta, located within Mackenzie County.
