= Land-use framework regions of Alberta =

Land-use framework regions
- Location: Alberta
- Created: 2007
- Number: 7
- Populations: 37,759 (Lower Peace) – 1,814,190 (South Saskatchewan)
- Areas: 50,338 km^{2} (Red Deer) – 192,198 km^{2} (Lower Peace)

Land-use framework regions are a scheme of organizing local governments adopted by the Canadian province of Alberta. Numbering seven in total, each land-use region is named for, and roughly follows the boundary of, a major watershed. Managed by Alberta Environment and Parks, the stated aims of the program are to create a venue for regionwide planning and cooperation, promoting sustainable use of public and private lands. Every region is intended to develop and enact its own comprehensive regional land-use plan, guiding future development within its territory. However, as of 2019, approved plans have only been submitted from two of the seven regions.

== History ==
Land-use planning has been practiced in various forms by the Alberta government for more than a century. In 1948, the Manning government divided the province into a 'green' and 'white' area. The 'Green Area', comprising 61% of Alberta's landmass and mostly owned by the provincial government, was to be managed for forest production, wildlife management, and recreation. The 'White Area', comprising the remaining 39%, was designated for settlement and agriculture. Further plans, some regional in scope, were implemented over the next few decades. For instance, the 1977 Policy for Resource Management of the Eastern Slopes identified watershed protection and public recreation as higher priorities than non-renewable resource development in Alberta's Rocky Mountain Foothills. However, these were implemented on a case-by-case basis, and never achieved comprehensive coverage of the province's landmass.

By the late 2000s, eight disparate provincial government departments each maintained an individual interest in land use. As facilitating effective Indigenous consultation became another concern of the era, the 2007 Land-use Framework was intended to provide the first-ever formal venue for cooperation between the provincial bureaucracy, its numerous local governments, and all other interested parties.

== List ==
Land-use framework regions of Alberta
Name	Census statistics (2016)			Percentage developed
Name	Area	Population	Population density	Percentage developed
Lower Peace Region	192,198 km^{2}	37,759	0.196	8.40%
Lower Athabasca Region	93,458 km^{2}	118,799	1.271	8.67%
Upper Peace Region	74,270 km^{2}	138,237	1.861	33.77%
Upper Athabasca Region	83,004 km^{2}	122,806	1.480	29.11%
North Saskatchewan Region	85,781 km^{2}	1,543,360	17.992	54.71%
Red Deer Region	50,338 km^{2}	292,018	5.801	61.74%
South Saskatchewan Region	83,774 km^{2}	1,814,190	21.656	51.47%

== See also ==
- Calgary Metropolitan Region
- Edmonton Metropolitan Region
