= Hay Lake 209 =

- Indian reserve
- Hay Lake Indian Reserve No. 209
- Location in Alberta
- Coordinates: 58°45′04″N 118°43′24″W
- First Nation: Dene Tha'
- Treaty: 8
- Country: Canada
- Province: Alberta
- Specialized municipality: Mackenzie

Area
  - Total: 12,355.3 ha (30,531 acres)
  - Land: 103.57 km^{2} (39.99 sq mi)

Population (2016)
  - Total: 883
  - Density: 8.5/km^{2} (22/sq mi)
- Time zone: UTC−06:00 (Alberta Time)

Hay Lake 209 is an Indian reserve of the Dene Tha' First Nation in Alberta, located within Mackenzie County. It is 100 km (62 mi) northwest of High Level. In the 2016 Canadian Census, it recorded a population of 883 living in 247 of its 277 total private dwellings.
