= High Level =

- Town
- Town of High Level
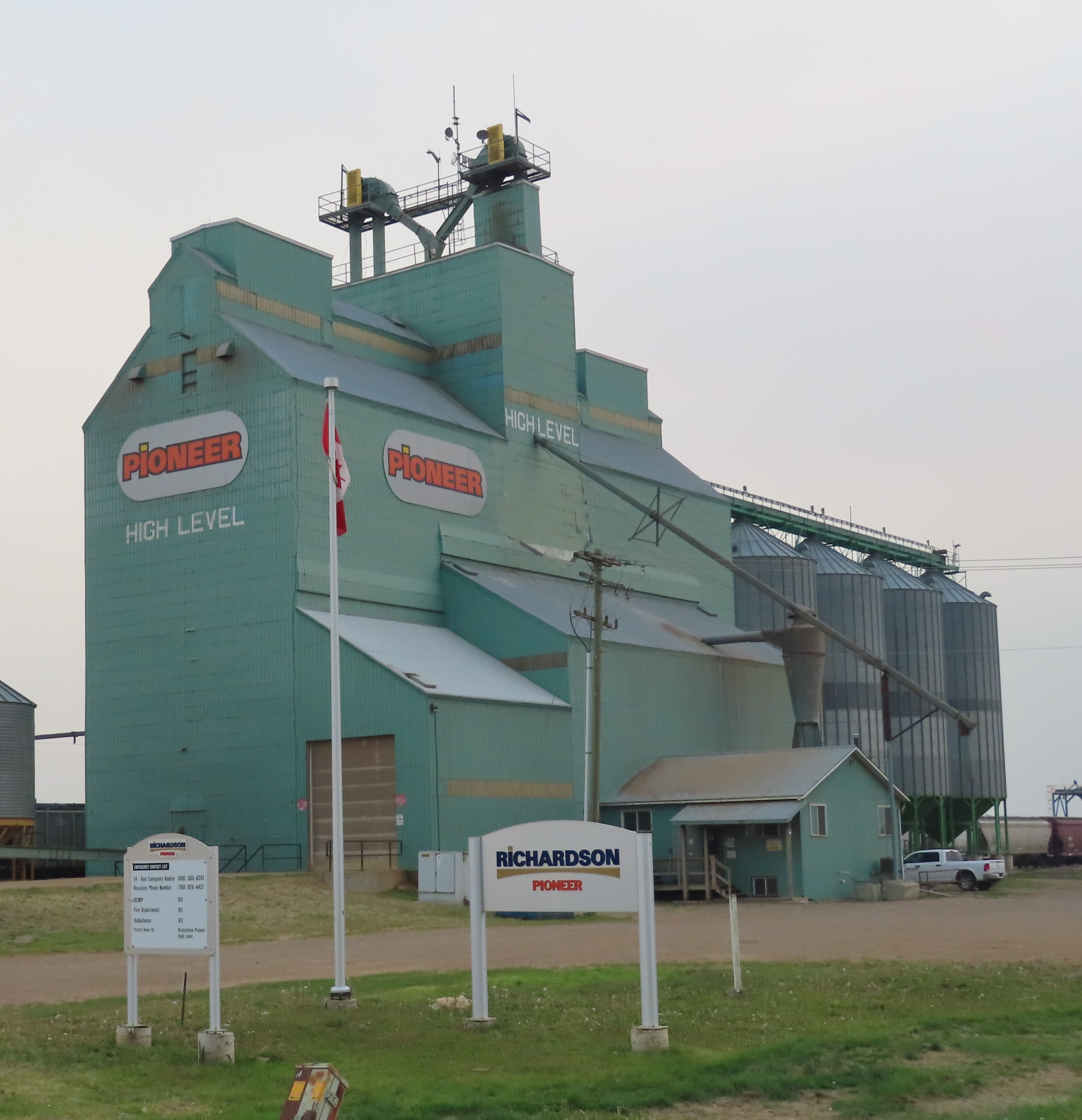

- Flag

- Location in Mackenzie County

- Location of High Level in Alberta High Level (Canada) High Level (North America)
- Coordinates: 58°31′01″N 117°08′10″W
- Country: Canada
- Province: Alberta
- Region: Northern Alberta
- Planning region: Lower Peace
- Specialized municipality: Mackenzie County
- Incorporated
  - New town: June 1, 1965

Government
  - Governing body: High Level Town Council
  - MP: Chris Warkentin (Grande Prairie-Mackenzie-Conservative)
  - MLA: Dan Williams (Peace River-UCP)

Area (2021)
  - Land: 28.7 km^{2} (11.1 sq mi)

Population (2021)
  - Total: 3,922
  - Density: 136.7/km^{2} (354/sq mi)
- Time zone: UTC−06:00 (Alberta Time)
- Forward sortation area: T0H 1Z0 & T0H 4J0
- Area codes: 780, 587, 825
- Highways: Highway 35; Highway 58
- Website: highlevel.ca

High Level is a town in northern Alberta, Canada. It is located at the intersection of the Mackenzie Highway (Highway 35) and Highway 58, approximately 733 kilometres (455 mi) north of Edmonton, approximately 451 kilometres (280 mi) north of Grande Prairie and 725 km (450 mi) south of Yellowknife, Northwest Territories. High Level is located within Mackenzie County and was founded in 1947. The town serves a trading area of approximately 20,000 people.

== History ==
The name High Level originated from the height of the land that separates the Peace and the Hay Rivers. The original location was approximately 5.6 km (3.5 mi) north of the present spot and along the old Fort Vermilion/Meander River freighting trail, serving as a stopping place, not a town. The original High Level Sports Grounds were at this location and the old trail was still visible there in the mid 1960s. The High Level Golf & Country Club currently occupies this approximate location. For many years, High Level was known as Tloc Moi (Hay Meadow). The first fur traders arrived in this area in 1786, but it was not until 1947 that High Level was settled, with development of road access to Fort Vermilion being the primary factor in determining the town's present location. High Level's first power plant was established in 1957, and a year later the first post office was built. The oil fields were discovered in the 1960s, and the Mackenzie Northern Railway was run to the area in 1963.

== Geography ==
High Level marks the northern extent of the Peace River Country, and has one of the northernmost lands suited for agriculture in Canada. Although High Level is well north of the median population of Canada, it is on a similar latitude to the northernmost town of mainland United Kingdom in Thurso and to the south of five European capitals.

=== Climate ===
High Level has a subarctic climate (Köppen climate classification Dfc), with precipitation falling chiefly during the spring and summer, and wide temperature variations, rendering warm summers for the classification. The name notwithstanding, this town lies at a low elevation for an Alberta community and the regional topography contributes to the extremes of temperature. In winter, very cold air often pools over the area. In summer, air masses originating from higher elevations warm by compression as they descend to High Level. Summer temperatures render High Level well within the vegetation zone, and winter average temperatures are less severe than further east in Canada, even at lower latitudes.

The coldest recorded temperature −50.6 °C (−59.1 °F) on January 13, 1972, with the hottest recorded temperature, of 36.0 °C (96.8 °F) was on July 9, 2024. The record high daily minimum was 19.3 °C (66.7 °F) recorded July 19, 2007. The record highest dew point was 24.8 °C (76.6 °F) recorded June 30, 2021. The most humid month was July 2007 with an average dew point of 13.0 °C (55.4 °F). The warmest month was July 2024 with an average mean temperature of 20.0 °C (68.0 °F), and an average daily maximum of 27.0 °C (80.6 °F). July 2007 recorded the month with the highest average monthly daily minimum of 12.4 °C (54.3 °F). July 2014 set a record of no maximum temperature below 19.2 °C (66.6 °F) for the entire month; July 1997 with no temperature below C, and July 1994 with no dew point below 5.2 °C (41.4 °F).

The lowest yearly maximum dew point is 15.8 °C (60.4 °F) recorded in 1986. The lowest yearly maximum daily minimum temperature is 12.8 °C (55.0 °F) recorded in 1974. The lowest yearly maximum temperature is 28.2 °C (82.8 °F) recorded in 2009.

The average yearly maximum dew point is 18.3 °C (64.9 °F) and the average yearly maximum daily minimum temperature is 15.7 °C (60.3 °F).

High Level

Climate chart (precipitation, max. and min. temperature)
J	F	M	A	M	J	J	A	S	O	N	D
20 −15 −25	16 −10 −23	17 −3 −16	15 8 −5	29 17 2	55 22 8	73 23 10	42 22 8	35 15 3	19 6 −4	21 −7 −16	20 −13 −23
- █ Average max. and min. temperatures in °C
- █ Precipitation totals in mm
- Source: Environment Canada
Imperial conversion
J	F	M	A	M	J	J	A	S	O	N	D
0.8 6 −13	0.6 14 −9	0.7 27 3	0.6 47 23	1.1 62 36	2.1 71 46	2.9 74 51	1.6 71 47	1.4 60 37	0.8 42 25	0.8 20 4	0.8 8 −10
- █ Average max. and min. temperatures in °F
- █ Precipitation totals in inches

Climate data for High Level (High Level Airport) Climate ID: 3073146; coordinates 58°37′17″N 117°09′53″W; elevation: 338 m (1,109 ft); 1991−2020 normals, extremes 1970−present (Note: Climate data 1991–2020 is a composite recorded at High Level A (WMO ID: 71066; climate ID: 3073140; coordinates 58°37′18″N 117°09′53″W; elevation: 338 m (1,109 ft)) and High Level A (climate ID: 3073146; coordinates 58°37′17″N 117°09′53″W; elevation: 338 m (1,109 ft)))
Month	Jan	Feb	Mar	Apr	May	Jun	Jul	Aug	Sep	Oct	Nov	Dec	Year
Record high humidex	11.4	14.2	18.3	29.8	33.8	35.5	39.8	37.7	32.2	26.2	13.4	13.7	39.8
Record high °C (°F)	11.3 (52.3)	14.6 (58.3)	18.5 (65.3)	30.2 (86.4)	33.9 (93.0)	33.5 (92.3)	36.0 (96.8)	35.2 (95.4)	30.2 (86.4)	26.1 (79.0)	15.0 (59.0)	14.2 (57.6)	36.0 (96.8)
Mean maximum °C (°F)	2.5 (36.5)	4.9 (40.8)	10.1 (50.2)	19.7 (67.5)	26.5 (79.7)	28.7 (83.7)	30.3 (86.5)	29.1 (84.4)	24.0 (75.2)	16.9 (62.4)	5.4 (41.7)	1.9 (35.4)	31.1 (88.0)
Mean daily maximum °C (°F)	−14.6 (5.7)	−10.2 (13.6)	−2.6 (27.3)	8.4 (47.1)	16.8 (62.2)	21.5 (70.7)	23.3 (73.9)	21.5 (70.7)	15.4 (59.7)	5.8 (42.4)	−6.5 (20.3)	−13.1 (8.4)	5.5 (41.8)
Daily mean °C (°F)	−19.8 (−3.6)	−16.3 (2.7)	−9.4 (15.1)	1.7 (35.1)	9.5 (49.1)	14.7 (58.5)	16.8 (62.2)	14.8 (58.6)	9.0 (48.2)	0.9 (33.6)	−11.1 (12.0)	−18.1 (−0.6)	−0.6 (30.9)
Mean daily minimum °C (°F)	−25.0 (−13.0)	−22.5 (−8.5)	−16.2 (2.8)	−4.9 (23.2)	2.1 (35.8)	7.8 (46.0)	10.3 (50.5)	8.1 (46.6)	2.6 (36.7)	−4.0 (24.8)	−15.5 (4.1)	−23.1 (−9.6)	−6.7 (20.0)
Mean minimum °C (°F)	−40.0 (−40.0)	−35.8 (−32.4)	−33.4 (−28.1)	−16.8 (1.8)	−5.5 (22.1)	0.7 (33.3)	4.0 (39.2)	0.7 (33.3)	−5.3 (22.5)	−14.0 (6.8)	−30.0 (−22.0)	−36.2 (−33.2)	−42.1 (−43.8)
Record low °C (°F)	−50.6 (−59.1)	−46.1 (−51.0)	−45.0 (−49.0)	−32.2 (−26.0)	−13.7 (7.3)	−3.6 (25.5)	−0.2 (31.6)	−4.4 (24.1)	−13.9 (7.0)	−36.3 (−33.3)	−43.4 (−46.1)	−47.2 (−53.0)	−50.6 (−59.1)
Record low wind chill	−57.1	−51.1	−50.3	−35.8	−22.1	−3.8	0.0	−6.1	−17.5	−32.9	−53.0	−54.5	−57.1
Average precipitation mm (inches)	19.7 (0.78)	15.7 (0.62)	17.3 (0.68)	14.8 (0.58)	28.9 (1.14)	54.6 (2.15)	72.9 (2.87)	41.9 (1.65)	34.5 (1.36)	19.1 (0.75)	21.0 (0.83)	19.6 (0.77)	360.0 (14.17)
Average rainfall mm (inches)	1.1 (0.04)	0.4 (0.02)	1.1 (0.04)	6.4 (0.25)	26.4 (1.04)	56.0 (2.20)	72.9 (2.87)	41.9 (1.65)	32.1 (1.26)	10.4 (0.41)	1.1 (0.04)	0.8 (0.03)	250.5 (9.86)
Average snowfall cm (inches)	26.9 (10.6)	20.9 (8.2)	23.0 (9.1)	10.9 (4.3)	2.9 (1.1)	0.0 (0.0)	0.0 (0.0)	0.0 (0.0)	2.2 (0.9)	10.8 (4.3)	27.6 (10.9)	28.5 (11.2)	153.7 (60.5)
Average precipitation days (≥ 0.2 mm)	12.5	9.0	7.8	5.3	8.5	11.8	13.0	12.0	9.8	9.1	11.2	11.8	121.7
Average rainy days (≥ 0.2 mm)	0.72	0.29	0.54	2.5	7.9	11.8	13.0	12.0	9.6	5.3	1.1	0.62	65.3
Average snowy days (≥ 0.2 cm)	12.8	9.6	7.9	3.5	1.2	0.04	0.0	0.0	0.56	5.0	11.7	12.5	64.7
Average relative humidity (%) (at 1500 LST)	71.1	64.5	53.1	41.6	37.9	45.8	51.5	52.4	53.2	62.8	78.9	76.5	57.4
Average dew point °C (°F)	−23.3 (−9.9)	−20.1 (−4.2)	−15.0 (5.0)	−6.8 (19.8)	−0.1 (31.8)	7.3 (45.1)	10.7 (51.3)	9.3 (48.7)	3.7 (38.7)	−3.3 (26.1)	−13.3 (8.1)	−20.8 (−5.4)	−6.0 (21.2)
Mean monthly sunshine hours	52.6	96.2	178.5	239.4	280.1	298.2	295.2	264.4	168.0	101.3	46.0	35.3	2,055.1
Percentage possible sunshine	23.8	36.8	48.9	55.4	53.7	54.5	54.1	55.3	43.5	31.7	19.5	17.7	41.2
Source 1: Environment and Climate Change Canada (sun 1981–2010)
Source 2: weatherstats.ca (for dewpoint and monthly/yearly average absolute maximum/minimum temperature)

=== Fauna ===
High Level has a variety of wildlife, including wolves, coyotes, ravens, and many types of insects. Hunters can find moose, deer, bear and geese. There are over 150 species of birds known to nest in the area.

== Demographics ==
Federal census population history
Year	Pop.	±%
1966	708	—
1971	1,614	+128.0%
1976	1,562	−3.2%
1981	2,194	+40.5%
1986	3,004	+36.9%
1991	2,849	−5.2%
1996	3,093	+8.6%
2001	3,444	+11.3%
2006	3,887	+12.9%
2011	3,641	−6.3%
2016	3,159	−13.2%
2021	3,922	+24.2%
Source: Statistics Canada

In the 2021 Census of Population conducted by Statistics Canada, the Town of High Level had a population of 3,922 living in 1,313 of its 1,467 total private dwellings, a change of 24.2% from its 2016 population of 3,159. With a land area of 28.7 km^{2} (11.1 sq mi), it had a population density of 136.7/km^{2} (353.9/sq mi) in 2021.

The population of the Town High Level of according to its 2017 municipal census is 3,992, a change of 4.4% from its 2015 municipal census population of 3,823.

In the 2016 Census of Population conducted by Statistics Canada, the Town of High Level recorded a population of 3,159 living in 1,096 of its 1,339 total private dwellings, a −13.2% change from its 2011 population of 3,641. With a land area of 29.2 km^{2} (11.3 sq mi), it had a population density of 108.2/km^{2} (280.2/sq mi) in 2016.

== Economy ==
The area surrounding High Level is known for its oil reserves and forests. Two large oil and gas fields, Rainbow Lake which is located west of the town and Zama City which is located northwest of the town provides services to the oil patch. One OSB mill (which closed in 2007, and reopened in 2015 after the merger of Ainsworth and Norbord) is located south of High Level and a dimensional lumber mill is located in the town's industrial area.

High Level has the most northerly grain elevator in Canada and is a grain terminal for the large agricultural area. There are approximately 350,000 cultivated acres of farm land in the region and farmers transport their grains from up to 120 km (75 mi) away.

== Government ==
The town has a council consisting of a mayor (Josh Lambert) and six councillors (Nickoi Breierle, Belinda Forest, Mark Liboiron, and Brielle Mercredi) with two vacancies as of 8 April 2026.

== Infrastructure ==
Both airplane and helicopter services are available in High Level. Due to the 'remote' location, medevac, and chartered services, provided by Nor-Alta Aviation, Highland Helicopters, and Delta Helicopters (which is not associated with Delta Air Lines), are offered to serve the surrounding communities.

Scheduled airline service is offered at High Level Airport by Central Mountain Air; direct flights to Edmonton are offered on Tuesday, Thursday, and Sunday.

Telephone service is provided by the incumbent carrier Telus as well as Northwestel.

Regional businesses are represented by the High Level and District Chamber of Commerce.

== Education ==
High Level has three public schools and one private school.

- High Level Public School was the first school built in High Level and had all grades, K-12, until Florence MacDougall Community School opened. It now goes from grade 7-12.
- Spirit of the North Community School is the newest school in High Level and opened in 2000; it houses grades 4-6.
- Florence MacDougall Community School goes from kindergarten through third grade.
- High Level Christian Academy goes from kindergarten through grade 9, after which students transfer to High Level Public School.
- According to the Fraser Institute, in 2016-17 High Level Public School was ranked 226 out of 262 schools.

== Media ==
The local radio station is CKHL-FM 102.1, part of the YL Country network of stations based at CKYL in Peace River. In addition, two radio services have repeaters: CBXL 99.5 FM, carrying CBC Radio One as a repeater of CBX Edmonton, and CFKX-FM 106.1, repeating CKKX-FM from Peace River. The local newspaper is The Echo.

Television is available by way of locally owned low-powered analogue repeaters of CITV-DT Edmonton (CH2807 channel 10) and CHAN-DT Vancouver (CH2808 channel 12), both owned by the High Level Community Hall Society.

The cable television system, in operation for 25 years as High Level Cable, was purchased in August 2006 by Northwestel Cable. Both analog and digital formats are available for television service. High-speed Internet service is also available from Northwestel.

== See also ==
- List of communities in Alberta
- List of towns in Alberta
- Tom Clancy's Endwar (Berkley Books 2008): High Level is the site of a major battle between American and Russian forces in this novel about World War III in which Russia invades Canada for the purpose of acquiring additional sources of oil.
