= CanWest Air =

Canadian charter airline

Can West Corporate Air Charters Ltd.

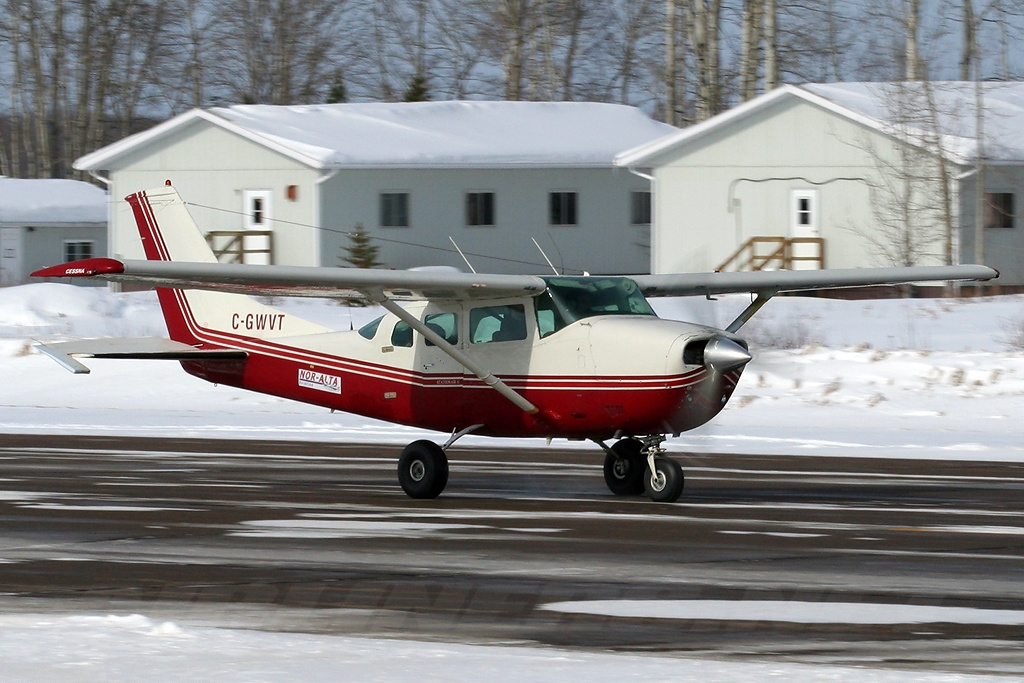
- A Cessna 206 at Fort Vermilion Airport
| IATA | ICAO | Call sign |
|---|---|---|
| - | CWA | CAN WEST |
- Founded: 1986
- AOC #: 5659
- Hubs: Fox Lake Airport; Edmonton International Airport; Calgary International Airport; Grande Prairie Airport; Peace River Airport; Fort Vermilion Airport; High Level Airport; Medicine Hat Airport; Slave Lake Airport; Fort McMurray Airport; Lac La Biche Airport
- Fleet size: 23
- Headquarters: Edmonton, Alberta
- Key people: Abe Neufeld (CEO); Adam Kent (C206 first officer)
- Website: http://canwestair.com/

CanWest Air is a charter airline based in La Crete, Alberta. Founded in 1986 as Little Red Air Service, CanWest Air provides on-demand charter services to the communities of the Little Red River Cree Nation as well as to various other companies throughout northern Alberta. Nor-Alta Aviation also provides Air Ambulance services under contract from Alberta Health Services. Nor-Alta Aviation purchased Can-West Corporate Air Charters Ltd., and became Can-West Corporate Air Charters a Nor-Alta Aviation Company in late 2015.

== History ==
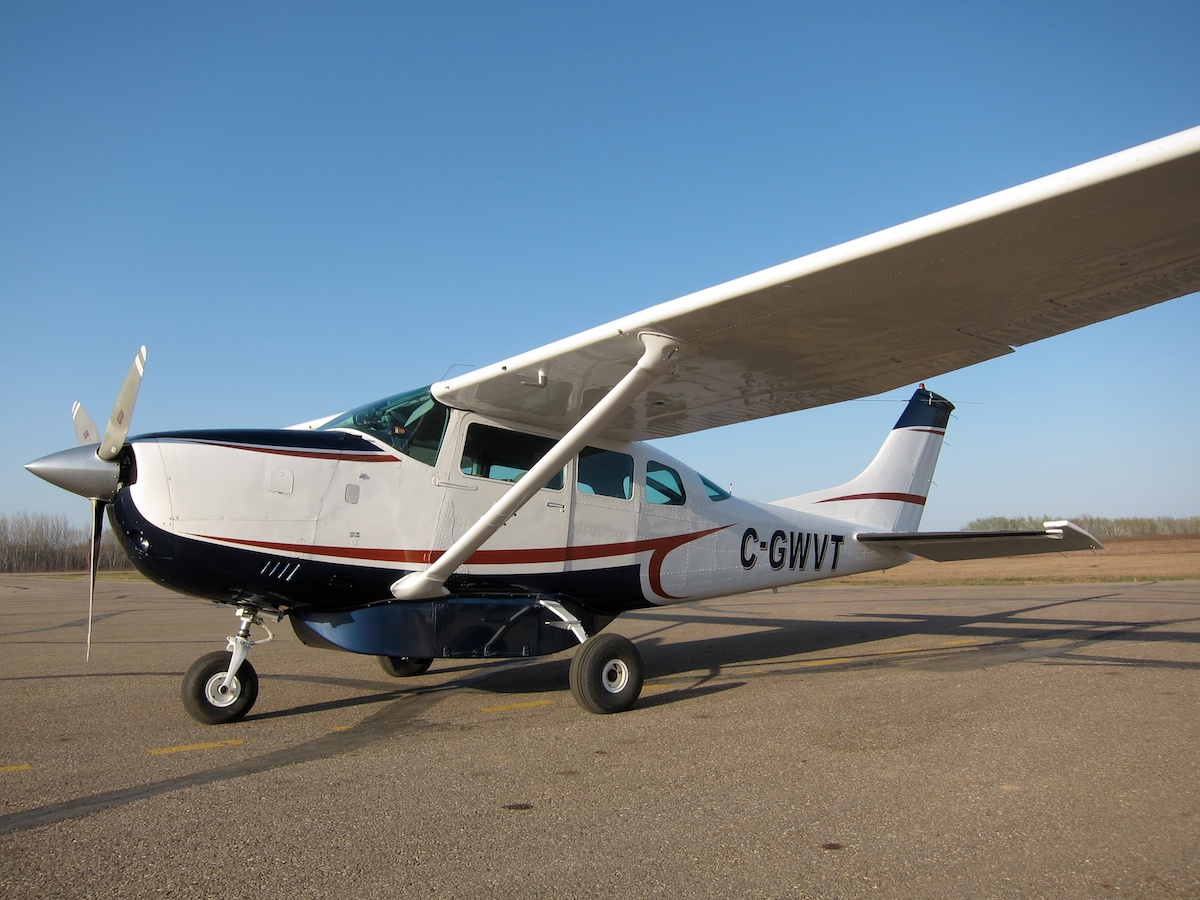
A Nor-Alta Aviation Cessna 206 on the apron at Fort Vermilion Airport

Nor-Alta Aviation began in 1986 as Little Red Air Service, which was owned and operated by the Little Red River Cree Nation. The purpose was to provide passenger charter and air ambulance services between the communities of Fox Lake, John D'Or Prairie, and Garden River, Alberta. As the company expanded it began to offer additional charter services throughout northern Alberta and western Canada. Later, LRAS secured a contract from the Alberta provincial government to provide air ambulance services from Fort Vermilion.

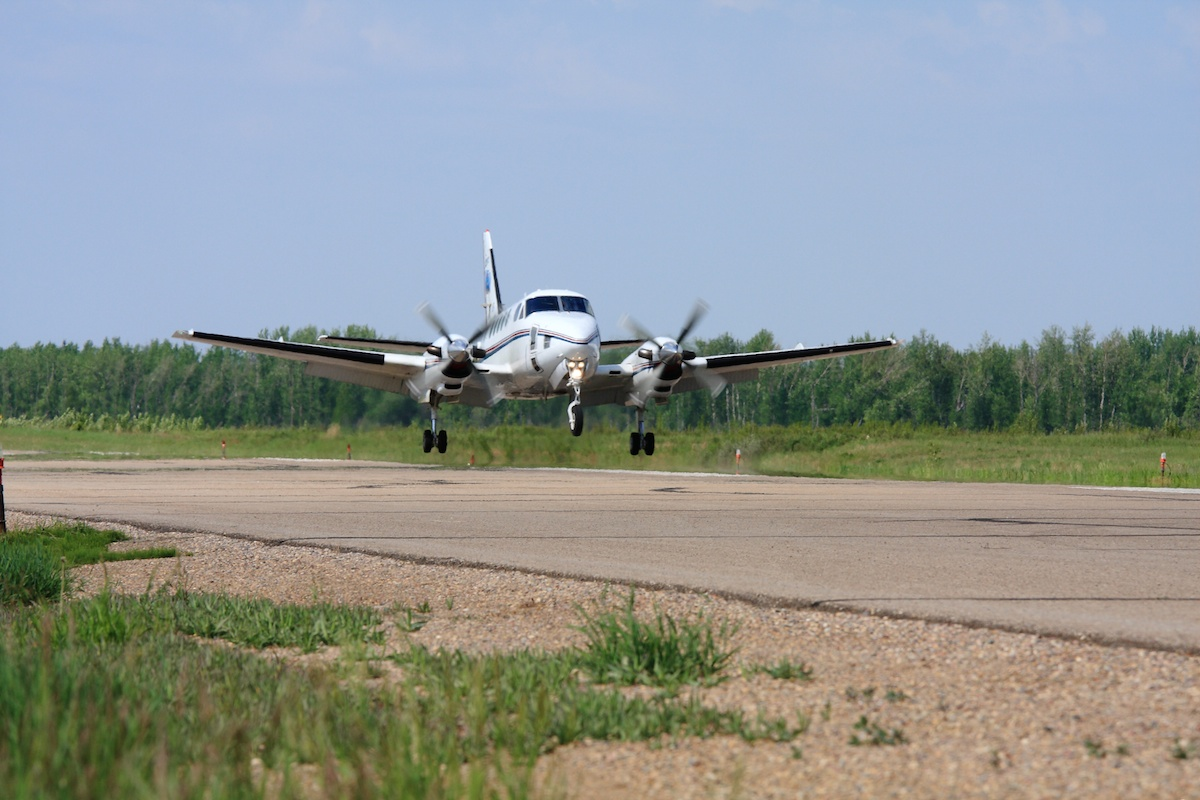
A Nor-Alta Aviation King Air A100 touching down on Runway 08 at Fort Vermilion Airport

Nor-Alta Aviation Leasing Inc. was formed in 2004 for the purpose of leasing aircraft to Little Red Air Service. These additional aircraft allowed LRAS to augment its air ambulance fleet and add executive charters to its list of services. In 2006, it acquired Slave Air, and the two companies entered into a management agreement, with Nor-Alta Aviation Leasing purchased the assets of LRAS. The new company became known as Nor-Alta Aviation, and was headed by a group of local entrepreneurs from the nearby community of La Crete.

In the summer of 2010, Nor-Alta Aviation expanded its operations to Fort McMurray after the grounding of Air Mikisew.

In 2015, Nor-Alta Aviation purchased Can-West Corporate Air Charters Ltd., which was founded in 1988, and served Wabasca, Slave Lake and Edmonton with medevac, private and executive charters. In late 2015 Nor-Alta Aviation took on the Can-West Corporate Air Charters Ltd name as part of its takeover.

Prior to the end of 2015, Can-West Corporate Air Charters Ltd. secured the purchase of Meadow Air Ltd. and their fleet of Cessna 337s.

Can-West is now for sale for $500,000,000.

== Destinations ==
CanWest Air does not offer any scheduled air services. Frequent destinations for charter flights include the communities of the Little Red River Cree Nation, as well as Fort Chipewyan, Fort McMurray, Grande Prairie, Edmonton, and several fishing lodges and oil camps throughout northern Alberta.

== Fleet ==
As of March 2024, CanWest Air had the following aircraft registered with Transport Canada:

CanWest Air fleet
| Aircraft | No. of aircraft | Variants | Notes |
|---|---|---|---|
| Beechcraft Super King Air | 9 | Model B200GT, Model B200CGT, Model B300C | medevac configuration, executive charter, the Model B300C marketed as King Air 350C |
| Cessna 206 | 2 | U206G | Up to five passengers or 1,000 lb (450 kg) of freight |
| Cessna 208 Caravan | 8 | 208B Grand Caravan | Up to nine passengers or 3,000 lb (1,400 kg) of freight |
