= Adams Landing =

Coordinates: 58°23′22″N 115°04′37″W

Location of Adams Landing in Alberta

Adams Landing is an unincorporated community in Alberta within the John D'Or Prairie 215 Indian reserve. It is located south of Highway 58 and the community of John D'Or Prairie on the northern bank of the Peace River, downstream from its confluence with the Wabasca River. Adams Landing is approximately 120 kilometers (75 mi) east of High Level and has an elevation is 255 meters (837 ft).

C.P. Hotchkiss reported in his field notes, in 1920, that boats of all sizes stopped at Adams Landing.
