= Garden River, Alberta =

Community in Alberta, Canada

Garden River: ᓂᐦᑖᐏᑭᐦᒋᑫᐤ ᓰᐲᓯᐢ; nihtâwikihcikêw sîpîsis; Garden Creek
- Unincorporated community
- Location within Mackenzie County Location within Alberta
- Coordinates: 58°42′50″N 113°53′31″W
- Country: Canada
- Province: Alberta
- Region: Northern Alberta
- Planning region: Lower Peace
- Improvement district: 24
- Returned to Little Red River Cree Nation: June 19, 2017

Area (2021)
  - Land: 15.78 km^{2} (6.09 sq mi)

Population (2021)
  - Total: 706
  - Density: 44.7/km^{2} (116/sq mi)
- Time zone: UTC−06:00 (Alberta Time)
- Highways: Garden River Road
- Waterways: Peace River

Garden River, also known as Garden Creek (Cree: ᓂᐦᑖᐏᑭᐦᒋᑫᐤ ᓰᐲᓯᐢ, nihtâwikihcikêw sîpîsis), is an unincorporated community in northern Alberta, Canada, within Wood Buffalo National Park. It is on the north shore of the Peace River at the terminus of Garden River Road, an extension of Highway 58, approximately 190 kilometres (120 mi) east of the town of High Level. It is a First Nations community of the Little Red River Cree Nation.

== History ==
Lying 5 kilometres inside the original 1922 boundary of Wood Buffalo National Park, this predominantly First Nations community was never officially recognized by the federal government, until a special amendment to the Canada National Parks Act removed the community from the park on June 19, 2017. Corresponding orders-in-council from the provincial government of Alberta are expected to facilitate the creation of a new Indian reserve encompassing Garden River's territory. This would become the third reserve of the Little Red River Cree Nation, after Fox Lake 162 and John D'Or Prairie 215.

== Demographics ==
In the 2021 Census of Population conducted by Statistics Canada, Garden River had a population of 706 living in 113 of its 133 total private dwellings, a change of 9.8% from its 2016 population of 643. With a land area of 15.78 km^{2} (6.09 sq mi), it had a population density of 44.7/km^{2} (115.9/sq mi) in 2021.

Most of the residents speak Woods Cree at home.

== See also ==
- List of communities in Alberta
