= Elliott River =

Elliott River may refer to:

In Australia

- Elliott River (Queensland), a watercourse in the Wide Bay–Burnett region of Queensland
- Elliot River (Whitsunday Region, Queensland), a watercourse in North Queensland
- Elliott River (Victoria), a watercourse in Victoria

Elsewhere

- Elliott River (Canada)
