= Morningstar Air Express =

Canadian cargo airline

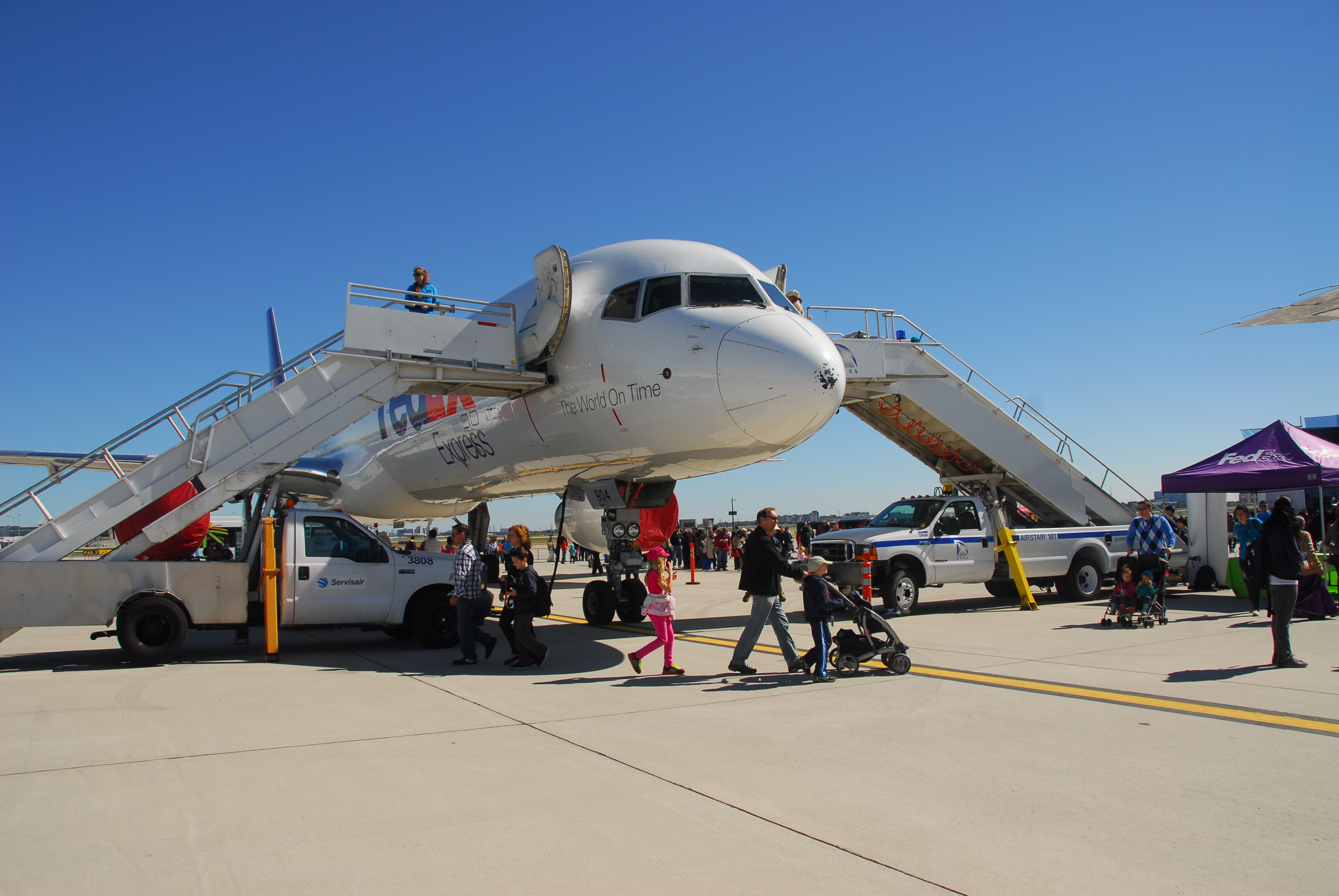
- A Boeing 757 of Morningstar Air Express in FedEx Express livery
IATA	ICAO	Call sign
—	MAL	MORNINGSTAR
- Founded: 1970
- AOC #: 681
- Hubs: Toronto
- Secondary hubs: Calgary; Montreal; Vancouver; Winnipeg
- Focus cities: Edmonton; Halifax; Moncton; Quebec
- Fleet size: 23
- Headquarters: Edmonton, Alberta, Canada
- Key people: Bill McGoey (President)
- Website: www.maei.ca

Morningstar Air Express Inc. is a cargo airline based in Edmonton, Alberta, Canada. It operates a contract all-cargo service from Halifax to Vancouver for FedEx Express within Canada, as well as all-cargo charter services. Its main base is Edmonton International Airport.

== History ==
The airline was founded in Edmonton in 1970 as Brooker-Wheaton Aviation Ltd. In January, 1992 the company became Morningstar Air Express. It is owned by Donald Wheaton (37.5%), Kim Ward (37.5%), and Bill McGoey (25%).

It was founded in Edmonton in 1970 by two Edmonton businessmen, Don Wheaton Sr. and Bev Brooker. The company enjoyed rapid growth due to the "oil boom" economy of Alberta during the 1970s. During this period, the company expanded into a Cessna sales, service and parts centre, a fuel dealership and a full service fixed-base operator (FBO) centre. Company flying activities initially involved cabin class piston and turboprop twins. In the late 1970s, the company added a Learjet 36 and a Hawker Siddeley HS.125 to its fleet.

In the early 1980s, the company divested of its piston fleet, continued to expand its turboprop and corporate jet fleet and went into aircraft leasing business. Also, during this period, Don Wheaton Sr. became the sole shareholder of Brooker Wheaton Aviation Ltd. During the mid-1980s, the company began flying for various courier companies. Brooker Aviation Ltd. expanded in this market in subsequent years with the addition of Fairchild Metroliners and Cessna 208 Caravans. In July 1990, the company acquired a contract to initially operate two Boeing 727s nationwide for FedEx Express Canada. November 1991 saw the addition of the Fokker F-27 aircraft for the FedEx Express Canada contract. Brooker Wheaton Aviation's expertise grew substantially in the early 1990s when the Max Ward family purchased half of the company after selling Wardair. At that time the name was changed to Morningstar Express when Don Wheaton Jr. and Kim Ward joined forces. In January 2013, Bill McGoey (President) purchased 25% of the company. The company has expanded to 23 all-cargo aircraft flying coast-to-coast in scheduled daily cargo service.

== Destinations ==
Morningstar Air Express operates a contract all-cargo service for FedEx Express between the following cities: Victoria, Vancouver, Nanaimo, Edmonton, Calgary, Winnipeg, Thunder Bay, Sault Ste Marie, Sudbury, North Bay, Timmins, Toronto, Montreal, Quebec City, Moncton, and Halifax.

== Fleet ==
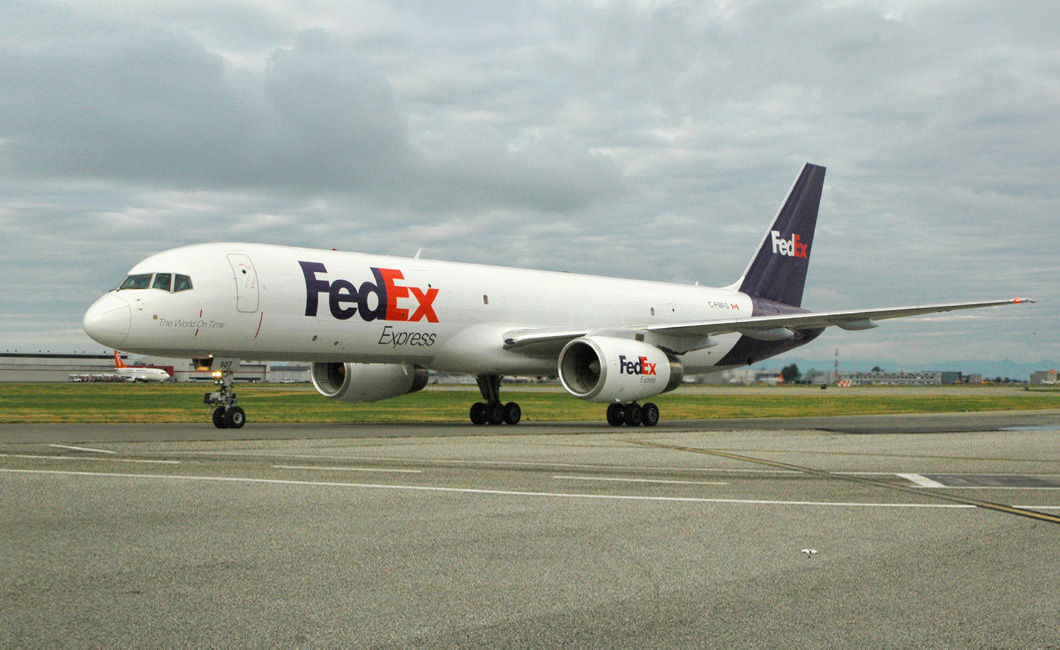
A Morningstar Boeing 757-200F at Vancouver International Airport, leased from FedEx Express

As of 12 January 2026, Morningstar Air Express had the following aircraft registered with Transport Canada. All aircraft are leased and operating for FedEx Express.

Morningstar Air Express fleet
Aircraft	In service	Variants	Notes
ATR 72	4	ATR 72-200	
Boeing 757	9	757-2B7	
Cessna 208 Caravan	7	208B Super Cargomaster	
Textron Aviation	4	Cessna 408 SkyCourier	Freighter
Total	24		

== Accidents and incidents ==
- On October 6, 2005, a Cessna 208B Super Cargomaster (C-FEXS) crashed shortly after takeoff from Winnipeg, Manitoba on a freight operations flight. The aircraft experienced icing conditions and was loaded beyond the weight category maximum for flight in icing conditions. The pilot lost control of the aircraft, which crashed on railroad tracks in Winnipeg. The pilot, who was the only occupant, was killed in the crash.
- On September 25, 2013, a Cessna 208B Super Cargomaster crashed in Hudson Bay about 110 nautical miles (200 km; 130 mi) north of Fort Severn, Ontario while operating a training flight from Sault Ste. Marie Airport in Ontario near the Canada–United States border. Part of the aircraft's underbelly cargo pod was recovered from the sea but the pilot, who was the only occupant, was never found.
