= Mikkwa River =

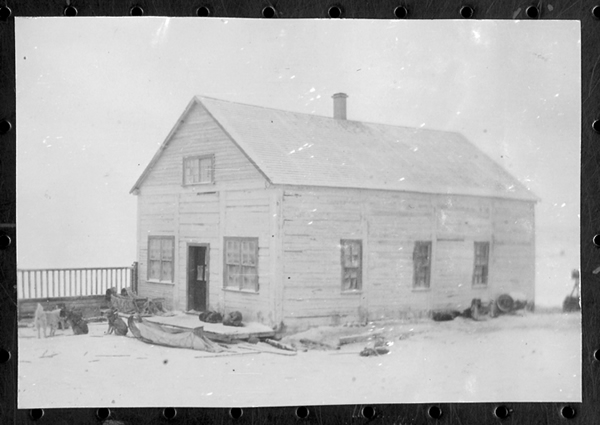
- The Hudson's Bay Company trading post at the mouth of the Mikkwa, photographed by Norman Lubbock Robinson in 1919

- Location of the mouth in Alberta
- Etymology: Cree: mihkwâw, "it is red"

Location
- Country: Canada
- Province: Alberta

Physical characteristics
- Source: Legend Lake
  - location: Birch Mountains Wildland Provincial Park, Regional Municipality of Wood Buffalo
  - coordinates: 57°24′21″N 112°57′36″W
  - elevation: 790 m (2,590 ft)
- Mouth: Peace River
  - location: Little Red River, Mackenzie County
  - coordinates: 58°24′35″N 114°46′01″W
  - elevation: 235 m (770 ft)
- Length: 385 km (240 mi)

Basin features
- Tributaries
  - left: Sputina River, Owl Creek
  - right: Elliott River, Burnt River

The Mikkwa River is a tributary of the Peace River in northern Alberta, Canada. It is approximately 385 kilometres (240 mi) long and drains an area of 6,165.52 square kilometres (2,380.52 sq mi).

== Name ==
The word Mikkwa comes from the Cree word mihkwâw, meaning "it [an inanimate object] is red", a reference to the colour of the river's waters. The Mikkwa was known as the Red River or Little Red River until 1914, when its name was changed to avoid confusion with similar place names in Alberta. In particular, Fort McKay in northeastern Alberta was also known as Little Red River until 1912.

== Description ==
The Mikkwa River flows out of the west shore of Legend Lake in Birch Mountains Wildland Provincial Park. As it enters the flat terrain of the Peace River Lowland, its course becomes meandering with many oxbow lakes. It flows northwest to its confluence with Owl Creek, where it turns northeast, emptying into the Peace River about 10 kilometres (6 mi) east of Vermilion Falls. Swift, shallow, and having many rapids, the river is only passable for canoes during high water. Exposures of Devonian limestone known as the Mikkwa Formation occur along the last two miles of the river. The winter road connecting Fox Lake to Fort Vermilion crosses the Mikkwa on an ice bridge about 1.5 kilometres (0.93 mi) upstream of its mouth.

Water temperatures up to 18.5 °C (65.3 °F) were recorded in the Mikkwa River in August 1988.

== Wildlife ==
Fish found in the Mikkwa River include walleye, goldeye, flathead chub, trout-perch, arctic grayling, northern pike, burbot, longnose sucker, and white sucker.

The lower reaches of the river are home to the Wabasca–Mikkwa wood bison herd, which are genetically different from bison herds in Wood Buffalo National Park and, unlike those herds, free of bovine tuberculosis and brucellosis. Moose are also common in this area. The range of the Red Earth boreal caribou herd overlaps the upper portion of the river's watershed.

== Human activity ==
In 1798 or 1799, John Thomson of the North West Company built a fort on the north side of the Peace River opposite the mouth of the Mikkwa, which was abandoned and in ruins by 1805. In 1842, the Beaver First Nation ceded nine square miles (23 km^{2}) of land at the mouth of the Mikkwa to William Shaw of the Hudson's Bay Company. In 1871, George Kennedy of the Hudson's Bay Company built Red River Post at the mouth of the Mikkwa. The lower 200 miles (320 km) of the Mikkwa River were investigated by Richard George McConnell in 1889. In 1961, the Hudson's Bay post on the Mikkwa was moved to Fox Lake.

By the mid-1870s, a group of Cree from Trout Lakes had settled in the area of the lower Wabasca and Mikkwa rivers. They joined Treaty 8 on July 11, 1899 and are now known as the Little Red River Cree Nation. They lived off the land until the early 1960s, and still hunt and fish in the area. The mouth of the Mikkwa was a traditional meeting place and has now become a pilgrimage site.

The Peerless Trout First Nation has a reserve, Peerless Meadows 238C, on the Sputina River, a tributary of the Mikkwa.

== See also ==
- List of rivers of Alberta
