= Mikkwa Formation =

Canadian geologic formation

- Stratigraphic range: Devonian
- Type: Formation

Location
- Region: Alberta
- Country: Canada

The Mikkwa Formation is a geologic formation in Alberta. It outcrops along the Peace River east of Vermilion Falls and at the mouth of the Mikkwa River. It has preserved fossils dating back to the Devonian period.

== See also ==
- List of fossiliferous stratigraphic units in Alberta
