= Edmonton International Airport =

Airport in Alberta, Canada

YEG Edmonton International Airport

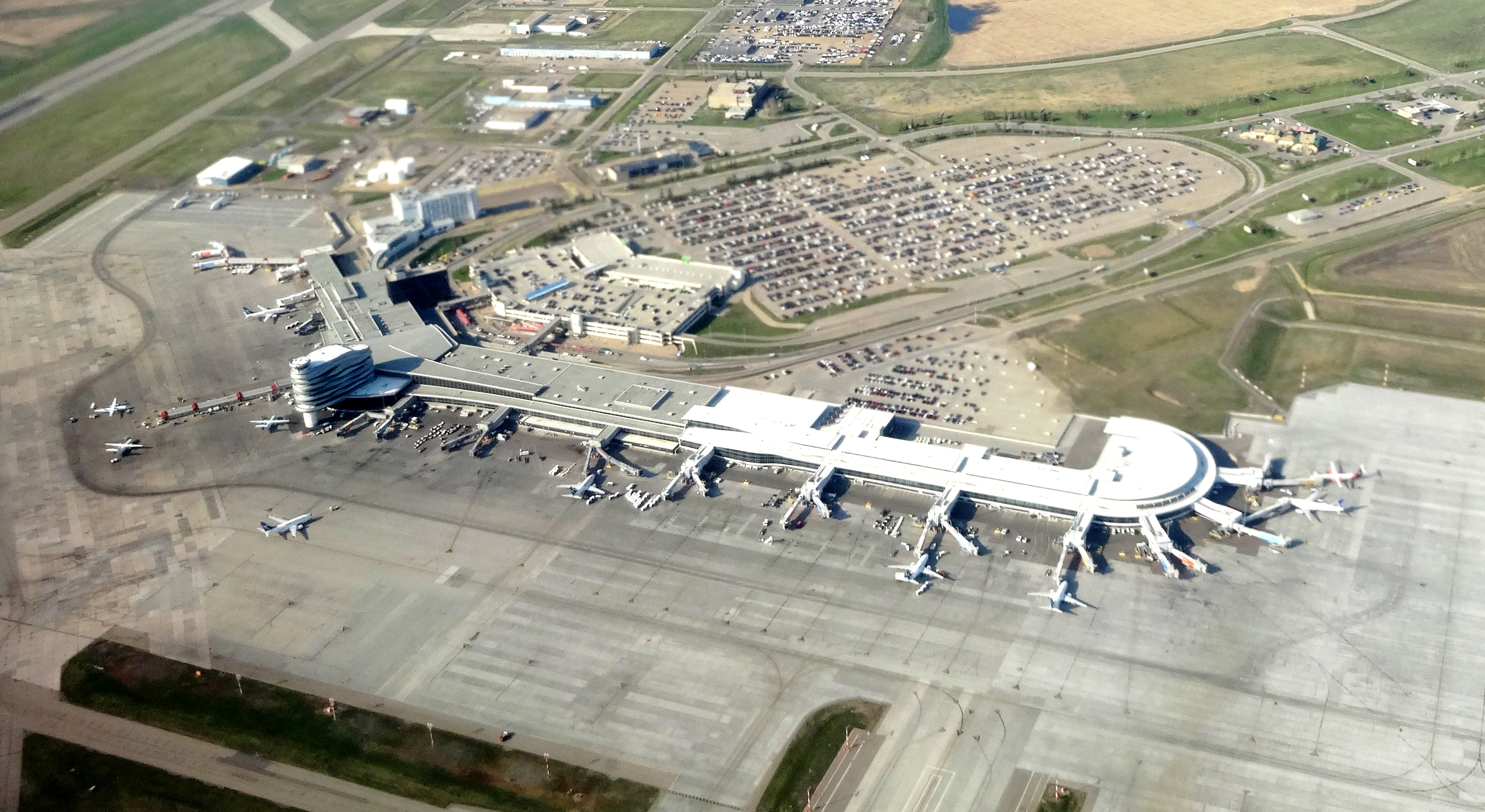
- IATA: YEG; ICAO: CYEG; WMO: 71123

Summary
- Airport type: Public
- Owner: Transport Canada
- Operator: Edmonton Airports
- Serves: Edmonton Metropolitan Region
- Location: Leduc County, between Leduc and Edmonton, Alberta, Canada
- Opened: November 15, 1960; 66 years ago
- Focus city for: WestJet
- Operating base for: Canadian North; Central Mountain Air; Flair Airlines; Morningstar Air Express; Nolinor; Summit Air
- Time zone: Alberta Time (UTC−06:00)
- Elevation AMSL: 2,373 ft (723 m)
- Coordinates: 53°18′36″N 113°34′46″W
- Public transit access: 747; Leduc Transit 10
- Website: www.flyyeg.com

Map
- Location in Alberta CYEG (Canada)

Runways
Direction	Length		Surface
Direction	ft	m	Surface
02/20	10,995	3,351	Asphalt
12/30	10,200	3,109	Asphalt

Statistics (2025)
- Total passengers: 8,140,815
- Sources: Canada Flight Supplement; Environment Canada; Movements from Statistics Canada; Passengers from Edmonton Airports.

Edmonton International Airport (IATA: YEG, ICAO: CYEG), officially branded YEG Edmonton International Airport, is an international airport that serves as the primary air passenger and air cargo facility in the Edmonton Metropolitan Region of the Canadian province of Alberta. It is located 30 km (19 mi) south of Downtown Edmonton in Leduc County on Highway 2 opposite of the city of Leduc, and spans just under 28 km^{2} (7,000 acres) making it the largest airport in Canada by land area and the 5th busiest airport in the country by passenger traffic.

The airport offers scheduled non-stop flights to major cities in Canada, the United States, Mexico, the Caribbean, Central America and Europe. Edmonton International Airport is one of nine Canadian airports that contain U.S border preclearance facilities. It is a hub facility for Northern Alberta and Northern Canada. The airport serves as the headquarters and hub for two major Canadian airlines, passenger carrier Flair Airlines and cargo carrier Morningstar Air Express.

== History ==
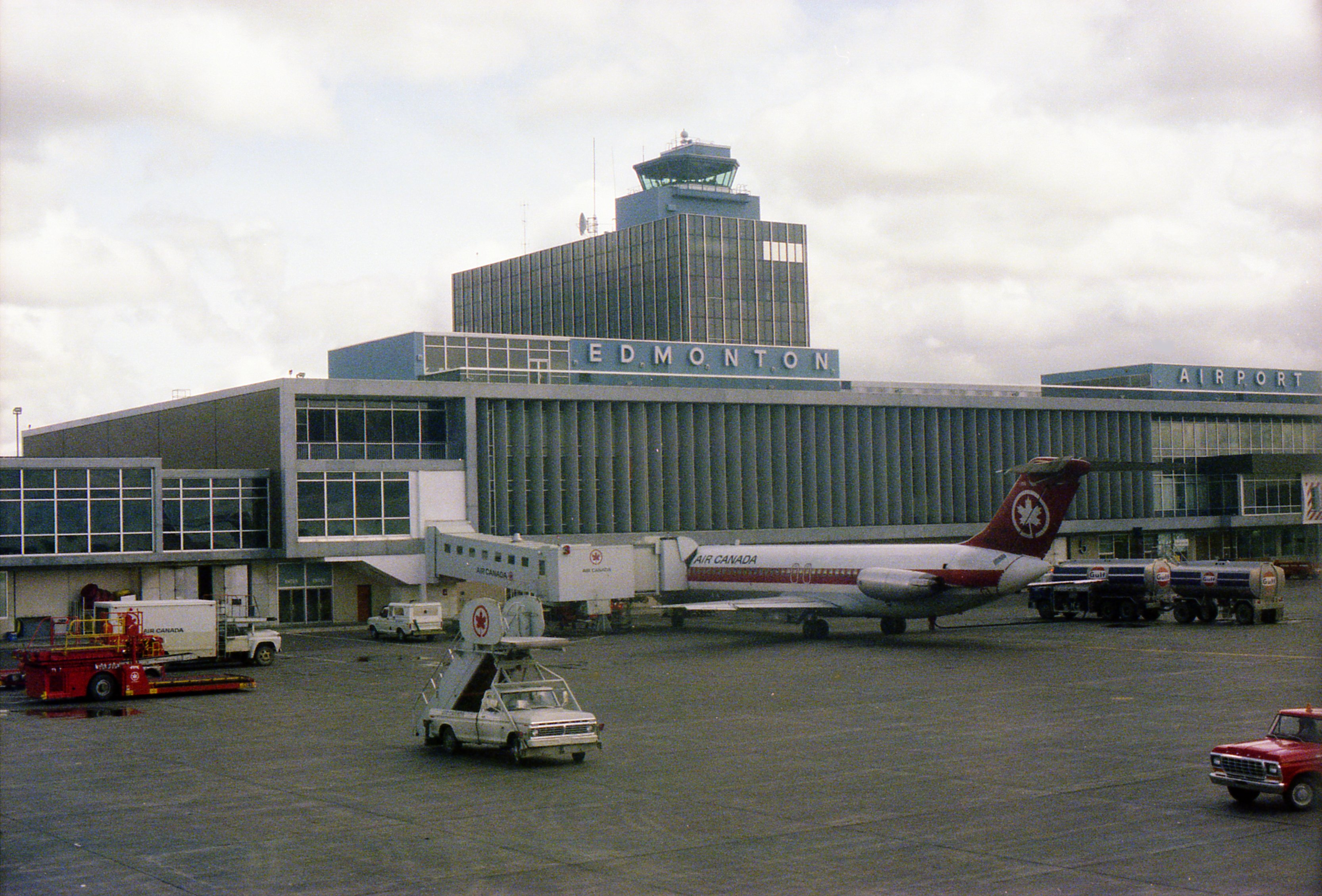
The 1963 airside terminal with an Air Canada DC-9-30 at a jet bridge gate (1979)

Transport Canada selected the current site for Edmonton International Airport, on the opposite side of the city from the military airport at RCAF Station Namao, and purchased over 28 km^{2} (7,000 acres) of land. When the airport opened on November 15, 1960, its first terminal was an arch hangar. Today, it is in use by Summit Air. In 1963, a passenger terminal, built in the international style, was opened. It remains in use as the North Terminal. Artwork, fired by Alberta natural gas, adorned the departures area exterior. A large mural, commissioned by the Canadian government in 1963 for $18,000 titled Bush Pilot in Northern Sky by Jack Shadbolt, remains to this day. An appraisal in 2005 indicated that the mural was worth $750,000, and a restoration of the mural was undertaken in 2007.

During the 1970s, the airport experienced rapid growth in traffic as the city of Edmonton grew, and served approximately 2 million passengers by 1980. However, from the early 1980s until 1995, traffic declined. This decline was attributed to the continued usage of Edmonton City Centre Airport as well as to a slowing economy. Edmonton City Centre did not have the facilities to accept large wide-bodied, long-haul aircraft. Thus airlines used City Centre to fly short-haul flights to hubs in other cities where connections to many locations were available.

Growth returned in 1995. In the 1995 Edmonton municipal election, 77% of voters approved by plebiscite to consolidate all scheduled jet passenger service at Edmonton International Airport.

In 1998, the airport began the $282 million "1998–2005 Redevelopment Project". The three-phase project included the construction of the south terminal and central hall concept, a commuter facility, doubling of the apron, and a multistorey parkade. This redevelopment project expanded the passenger capacity to 5.5 million.

By the time the expansion project was completed in 2005, continued passenger growth triggered planning for another expansion. A new 9,900 m^{2} (107,000 sq ft) control and office tower was added in 2009.

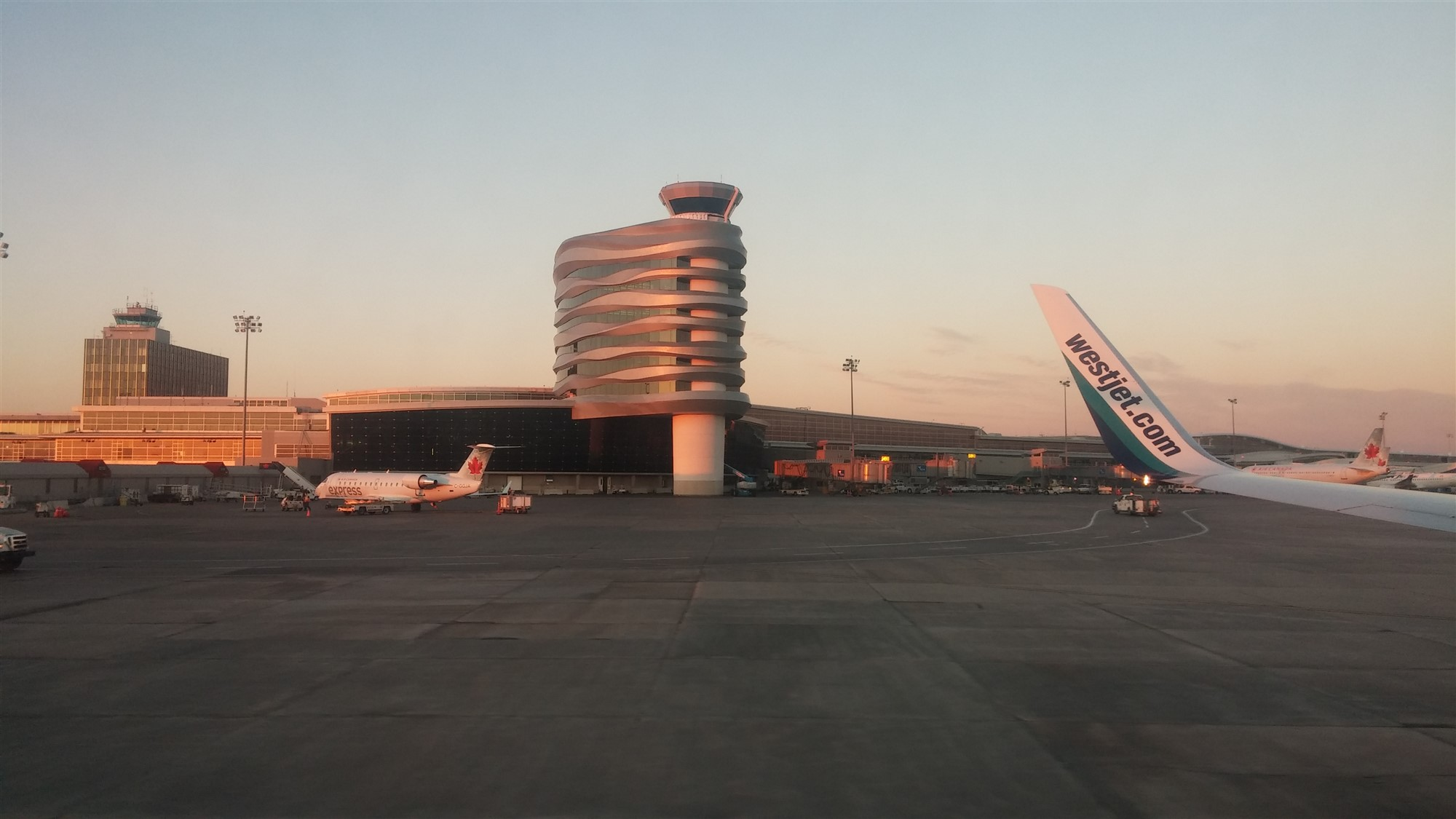
The 2009 control tower (1963 tower in background) and airside terminal (2015)

Further expansions completed in 2013 including seven new passenger gates, 14 boarding bridges, moving walkways, and advanced baggage handling and scanning systems. A new Renaissance Hotel was another major addition to the airport landscape.

The airport played a major role during the 2016 Fort McMurray wildfire, operating as hubs for aerial firefighting and medical evacuation. The airport became a way-station and temporary shelter for thousands of Fort McMurray evacuees. The Emergency Operations Centre in the airport ran for 112 hours, organizing the arrival and departure of hundreds of aircraft. During May 2016, the airport saw more than 300 additional daily flights on top of their regularly scheduled service.

In August 2016, the Government of Alberta announced $90 million in funding to begin twinning Highway 19 and protection of the area needed for a future third runway.

=== Historical international airline service ===
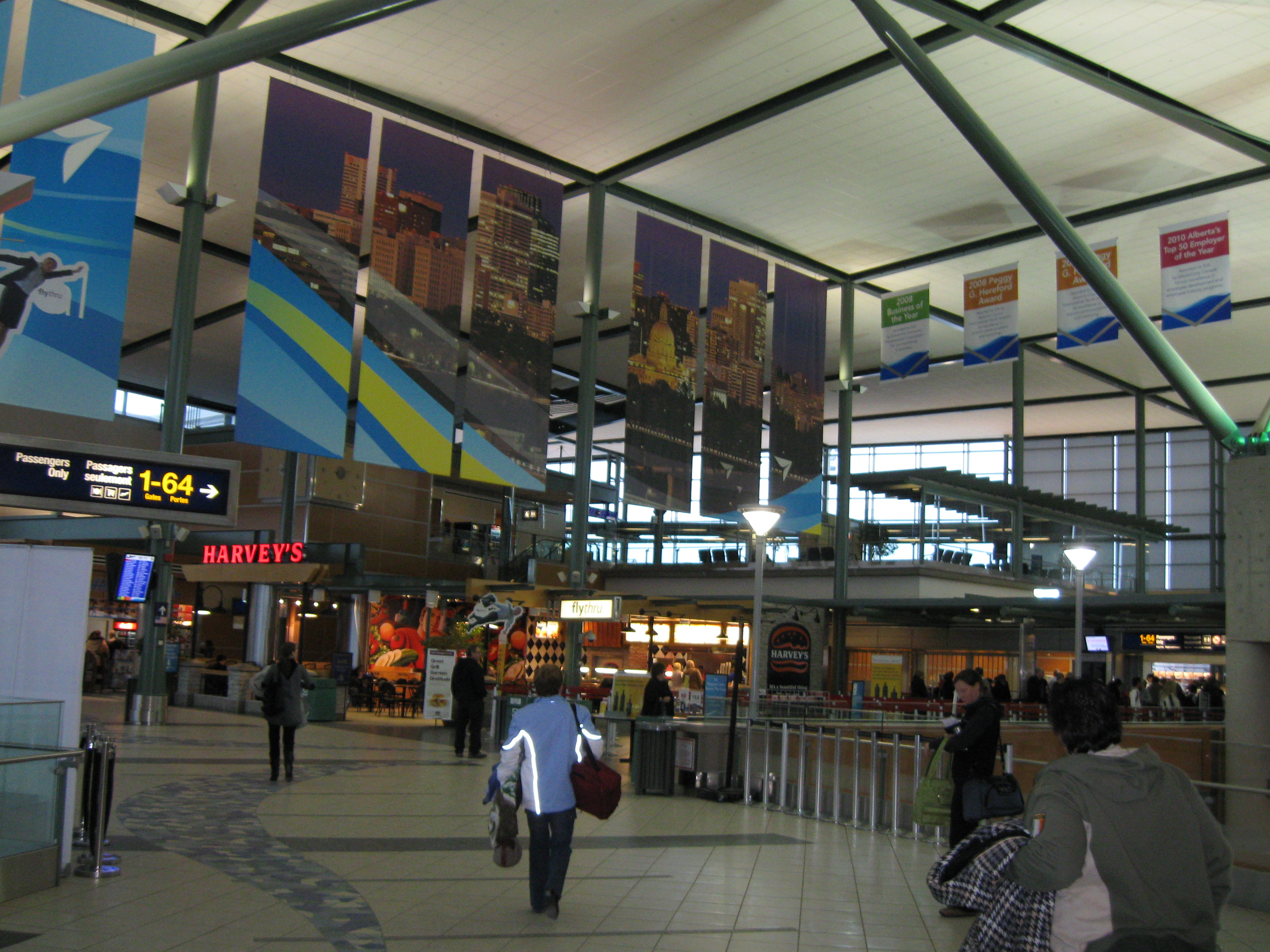
Central hall of YEG

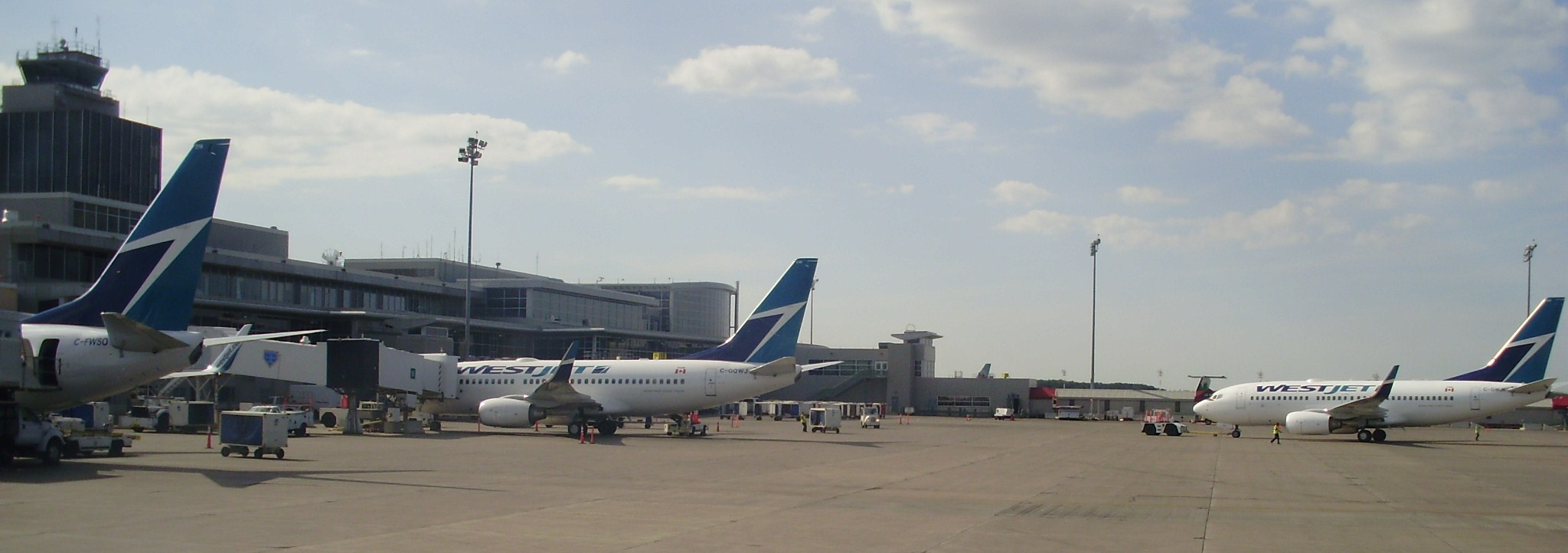
WestJet aircraft at Edmonton International Airport

The airport had international service soon after it opened. In 1960, Canadian Pacific Airlines was operating nonstop flights to Amsterdam with Bristol Britannia turboprop aircraft several times a week. By 1961, Canadian Pacific had introduced Douglas DC-8 jetliners on its nonstop service to Amsterdam. Also in 1961, US-based Northwest Airlines was operating daily Douglas DC-7C propliner service on a routing of Edmonton–Winnipeg–Minneapolis/St. Paul–Milwaukee–New York City Idlewild Airport (now JFK Airport). In 1962, Trans-Canada Airlines (TCA, now Air Canada) operated direct flights to London's Heathrow Airport once a week via a stop in Winnipeg and also to Paris Orly Airport three times a week via stops in Toronto and Montreal with DC-8 jets.

During the late 1960s and early 1970s, Pacific Western Airlines operated Boeing 707 charter flights from the airport to the UK and other destinations in Europe. In 1970, Air Canada operated nonstop DC-8 service to London-Heathrow twice a week while CP Air flew nonstop DC-8 service to Amsterdam three times a week. CP Air then introduced Boeing 747 jumbo jet service nonstop to Amsterdam with two flights a week being operated in 1976. By 1978, the airline was also flying nonstop 747 service to Honolulu. Air Canada had also begun daily nonstop Boeing 727-200 service to both Los Angeles and San Francisco by 1979 and was operating direct one stop McDonnell Douglas DC-9-30 service to Chicago O'Hare Airport via Winnipeg by 1985. Earlier, in 1983, both airlines were operating wide body jetliners on their respective services to Europe with Air Canada flying Lockheed L-1011 TriStar long range series 500 model aircraft three days a week nonstop to London Heathrow while CP Air was flying 747s three days a week nonstop to Amsterdam.

Wardair Canada also operated scheduled and charter flights to Europe as well as charter service to Hawaii from the airport and in 1979 was operating nonstop charter service to London Gatwick Airport and Prestwick in the UK as well as to Amsterdam and Frankfurt.In 1989, Wardair Canada was operating scheduled nonstop service to London Gatwick and Manchester in the UK and was also operating nonstop charter service at this same time to Frankfurt and Honolulu. The Wardair nonstop service to London Gatwick was being operated with Airbus A310 jets with two flights a week in 1989. LOT Polish Airlines flew to Warsaw, Poland until 2001.

Several US-based air carriers besides Northwest served the airport over the years as well. By 1975, Northwest was operating nonstop Boeing 727-100 jet service to both Anchorage and Minneapolis/St. Paul while Western Airlines was flying Boeing 727-200 and Boeing 737-200 jets direct to Denver, Salt Lake City and Great Falls (with all of these services first stopping in Calgary). Hughes Airwest also served the airport with Douglas DC-9-10 and McDonnell Douglas DC-9-30 jets on nonstop flights to Spokane as well as direct flights to Las Vegas and Los Angeles.

By 1980, Hughes Airwest was operating five daily departures from Edmonton with 727-200 and DC-9-30 jetliners with direct service via Calgary to Los Angeles, San Francisco, Las Vegas, San Diego, Phoenix, Tucson, Burbank, Reno, Boise, Spokane and Palm Springs. In 1981, Western Airlines was operating a daily nonstop 727-200 flight to Denver with continuing direct service to Phoenix and Los Angeles while Republic Airlines, which had acquired Hughes Airwest, flew daily nonstop DC-9-10 service to Las Vegas and Spokane. By 1982, Republic Airlines was operating all of its flights to the U.S. from Edmonton via an intermediate stop in Calgary with direct service to Las Vegas, Los Angeles, Phoenix, Spokane and Palm Springs. Also in 1982, Northwest was operating a daily 727-200 flight on a routing of Edmonton–Minneapolis/St. Paul–Chicago O'Hare Airport–Miami–Fort Lauderdale. United Airlines operated a daily 727-100 nonstop flight to San Francisco with direct one-stop service to Los Angeles in 1983. Western Airlines operated a 727-200 nonstop to Salt Lake City in 1987 with this daily flight providing direct one stop service to Los Angeles. Delta Air Lines then acquired and merged with Western with Delta continuing to operate nonstop service to Salt Lake City from the late 1980s to the mid-1990s, first with a 727-200 and later with a Boeing 757-200 with these flights providing direct one stop service to Los Angeles as well.

In 1999, Canadian Airlines International flew daily nonstop 737-200 service to Chicago O'Hare Airport while Air BC flew nonstop British Aerospace 146 jet service to Denver on behalf of Air Canada on a code sharing basis as an Air Canada Connector air carrier. Also in 1999, Horizon Air began nonstop Fokker F28 Fellowship jet service to Seattle flying on behalf of Alaska Airlines on a code sharing basis. Martinair Holland also operated flights between Edmonton International Airport and Amsterdam Schiphol Airport prior to the termination of this airline's passenger service. In 2005, America West Express operated by Mesa Airlines via a code sharing agreement on behalf of America West Airlines was flying nonstop to Los Angeles with Bombardier CRJ900 aircraft.

== Terminal ==
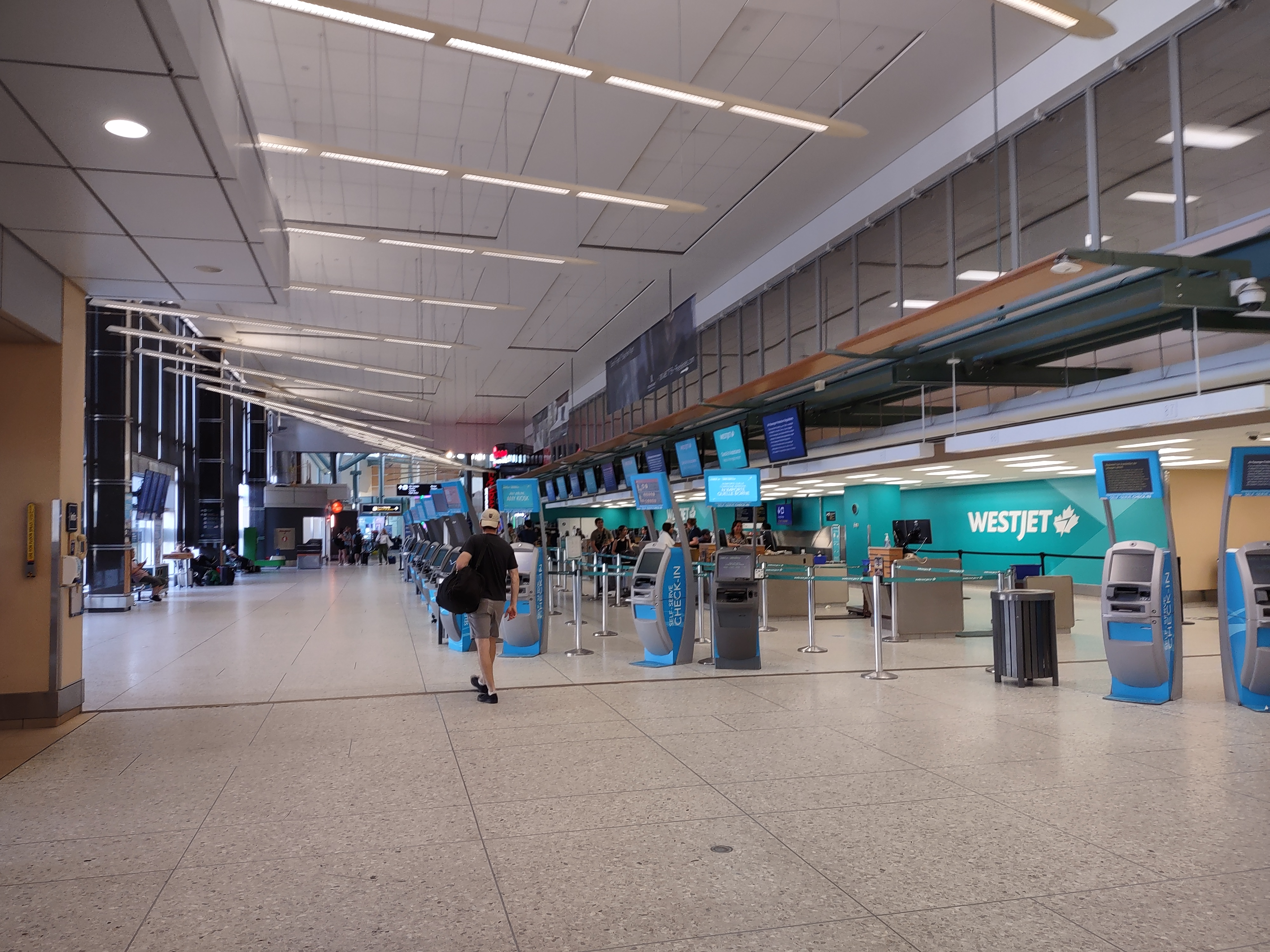
Check-in desks in the terminal in 2023

Edmonton International Airport's passenger terminal includes north and south sections and a central hall. Check-in and departure facilities are located on the departures level, with baggage reclaim and ground transportation facilities on the arrivals level. Domestic and non-U.S. international flights share a departures area, while U.S.-bound flights use a separate area with United States border preclearance facilities.

The permanent passenger terminal opened in 1963, replacing the temporary terminal used when the airport began operations in 1960. Major redevelopment in the late 1990s and early 2000s added the south terminal and Central Hall, which accommodated security screening and retail facilities. The Expansion 2012 program added a passenger concourse, gates and parking capacity. Further improvements included an expansion of Central Hall's pre-board screening area, which opened in 2019.

The airport provides a dedicated connection process for passengers arriving on domestic flights and continuing to the United States. Passengers with onward boarding passes and appropriately tagged baggage can use the U.S. Connections facility, with their checked bags transferred directly to the U.S. baggage screening and loading area.

Passenger lounges include an Air Canada Maple Leaf Lounge in the domestic and international departures area and two Plaza Premium Lounges, one serving domestic and international departures and the other serving U.S. departures. The 213-room Renaissance Edmonton Airport Hotel is connected to the terminal by an enclosed skybridge.

Executive Flight Centre also operates a separate terminal at the airport, Terminal 1, with a private executive lounge, passenger lobby and facilities for flight crews.

== Airlines and destinations ==
=== Passenger ===
Edmonton International Airport provides scheduled non-stop flights to over 50 destinations. It serves as the hub for Flair Airlines. Edmonton is one of WestJet's focus cities; the airline flies to 30 destinations with an average of 62 daily departures, nonstop, from Edmonton. WestJet (and its subsidiaries) are the largest carriers at Edmonton International Airport, holding more than 70% of the market share.

Airlines	Destinations
Air Canada	Montréal–Trudeau, Toronto–Pearson, Vancouver, Yellowknife; Seasonal: Newark (begins June 2, 2027), San Francisco (begins May 1, 2027)
Air Canada Express	Calgary, Vancouver
Air Canada Rouge	Vancouver; Seasonal: Cancún, Montego Bay (begins December 7, 2026)
Air North	Calgary, Whitehorse, Yellowknife (begins December 3, 2026)
Air Tindi	Fort Chipewyan, Fort Smith, Hay River, Yellowknife
Alaska Airlines	Seattle/Tacoma
Canadian North	Yellowknife
Central Mountain Air	High Level, Prince George
Discover Airlines	Seasonal: Frankfurt (begins June 1, 2027)
Flair Airlines	Abbotsford, Kelowna, Saint John (begins June 15, 2027), Toronto–Pearson, Vancouver, Victoria, Seasonal: Cancún, Kitchener/Waterloo, Puerto Vallarta, Winnipeg
KLM	Amsterdam
Porter Airlines	Hamilton (ON), London (ON) (begins May 6, 2027), Montréal–MET, Montréal–Trudeau, Ottawa, Toronto–Pearson; Seasonal: Las Vegas, Phoenix–Sky Harbor, Puerto Vallarta, San José del Cabo
United Airlines	Denver, Houston–Intercontinental
WestJet	Calgary, Cancún, Halifax, Kelowna, Las Vegas, Los Angeles, Montréal–Trudeau (resumes March 24, 2027), Minneapolis/St. Paul, Ottawa (resumes March 24, 2027), Phoenix–Sky Harbor, Puerto Vallarta, Toronto–Pearson, Vancouver, Victoria, Winnipeg; Seasonal: Charlottetown, Comox, Honolulu, Huatulco, Kahului, Mazatlán, Moncton, Montego Bay, Orlando, Palm Springs, Punta Cana, Reykjavík–Keflavík, Salt Lake City, San José del Cabo, St. John’s (NL)
WestJet Encore	Calgary, Comox, Fort McMurray, Grande Prairie, Kelowna, Regina, Saskatoon, Yellowknife; Seasonal: Kamloops, Nanaimo, Terrace/Kitimat

=== Cargo ===
Airlines	Destinations	Refs
Buffalo Airways	Yellowknife	
Cargojet	Calgary, Cincinnati, Hamilton (ON), Vancouver, Winnipeg	
FedEx Express	Memphis, Toronto–Pearson	
FedEx Express operated by Morningstar Air Express	Toronto–Pearson, Winnipeg	
FedEx Feeder	Calgary	

=== Air ambulance services ===
The airport is home to a purpose-built facility on its southern edge that is shared by Alberta Health Services fixed-wing air ambulance operations, as well as one of three bases in the province for STARS helicopter air ambulance. Nor-Alta Aviation also provides Air Ambulance services at Edmonton Airport under contract from Alberta Health Services. Nor-Alta Aviation purchased Can-West Corporate Air Charters Ltd. and became Can-West Corporate Air Charters a Nor-Alta Aviation Company in late 2015.

Edmonton Airport is also the base airport for Jet Companion, a Canadian aeromedical transport company that is active in medical repatriation missions and patient transfers in general, by commercial flights or stretcher charter. Jet Companion aeromedical crews travel in and out of Edmonton Airport on a daily basis as part of their medical missions elsewhere in Canada, or anywhere in the world.

== International cargo hub ==
Edmonton Airports initiated development of the Port Alberta concept in June 2006, aiming to establish the Edmonton region as an inland trade and transportation hub combining air, rail and road connections. In 2008, the federal government announced $1.5 million toward strategic planning for the initiative. Port Alberta received federal Foreign Trade Zone Point designation in June 2015, providing businesses with a single point of access to information on government trade programs. In March 2022, Edmonton Global, Edmonton International Airport and the federal government relaunched Port Alberta as a region-wide initiative supporting importers and exporters. Its scope encompasses the Edmonton metropolitan region's transportation and logistics infrastructure.

The airport expanded its cargo facilities through a $36 million program supported by an $18 million federal contribution. A 47,000-square-metre (510,000 sq ft) cargo apron expansion was completed in September 2022, providing additional parking capacity for four Boeing 747s or six Boeing 767s. The program also included a hydrant fuelling system connected to the airport's south fuel-storage facilities.

In July 2022, the federal government announced up to $100 million through the National Trade Corridors Fund toward the airport's International Cargo Hub. The $300 million project forms part of the planned development of approximately 809 hectares (2,000 acres) southwest of Runway 12/30 for cargo handling and related logistics activities. The airport identifies logistics, fulfilment and light manufacturing among the intended uses, with highway access provided through the 65 Avenue interchange.

The first phase covers approximately 150 acres (61 ha) and includes aircraft parking aprons, a section of taxiway parallel to Runway 12/30, airfield electrical infrastructure, access roads and stormwater-management facilities. Enabling work and site preparation began in September 2025, followed by an official groundbreaking ceremony on May 13, 2026. The airport estimates that the hub could attract $4 billion to $5 billion in investment at full build-out.

== Future development ==
The airport's Master Plan 2048 aims to accommodate 14.6 million terminal passengers annually by 2048. It proposes two additional north-terminal piers with passenger boarding bridges, relocation of Gate 49's regional boarding operations and the north fuel farm, and improvements to check-in, baggage handling, security screening and accessibility. An interim south-terminal expansion would add two gates, a swing-gate holdroom and associated apron space, with access to the international arrivals corridor. A larger south-terminal expansion beyond 2048 is intended to support more than 16 million passengers annually.

The YEG Ascent capital program includes terminal modernization and redevelopment of the north tower. Relocating administrative offices is intended to release space within the existing terminal for passenger facilities.

The Master Plan 2048 proposes considering an extension of Runway 12/30 by 2048 to support aircraft operating at maximum range, alongside additional parallel taxiways and runway entry and exit points. The existing two-runway system is expected to provide sufficient capacity through 2048; a third runway, parallel to Runway 12/30, is identified as a longer-term development dependent on demand reaching approximately 230,000 annual aircraft movements or 72–78 movements during peak hours.

In November 2024, the Department of National Defence announced negotiations to establish the Western Main Operating Base for the Royal Canadian Air Force's CC-330 Husky fleet at the airport, complementing the eastern base at CFB Trenton. Planned facilities include operations, maintenance, warehousing, training and administrative space. A February 2026 advance procurement notice described a two-bay hangar with approximately 40,000 m^{2} (430,000 sq ft) of tenant space, a new apron and taxiway, supporting infrastructure and potential fuelling facilities. It anticipated issuing a design-build solicitation in spring or summer 2026, subject to departmental approval. On October 7, 2026, the federal government identified $550 million for establishing the western operating base as part of its defence investments in Alberta.

== Other ==
=== Regional air traffic control ===
The Edmonton Area Control Centre (ICAO: CZEG) operated by Nav Canada is located at the airport. It is responsible for all aircraft movements over a flight information region (FIR) consisting of Alberta and most of northern Canada, including the high Arctic.

=== Airline operational facilities ===
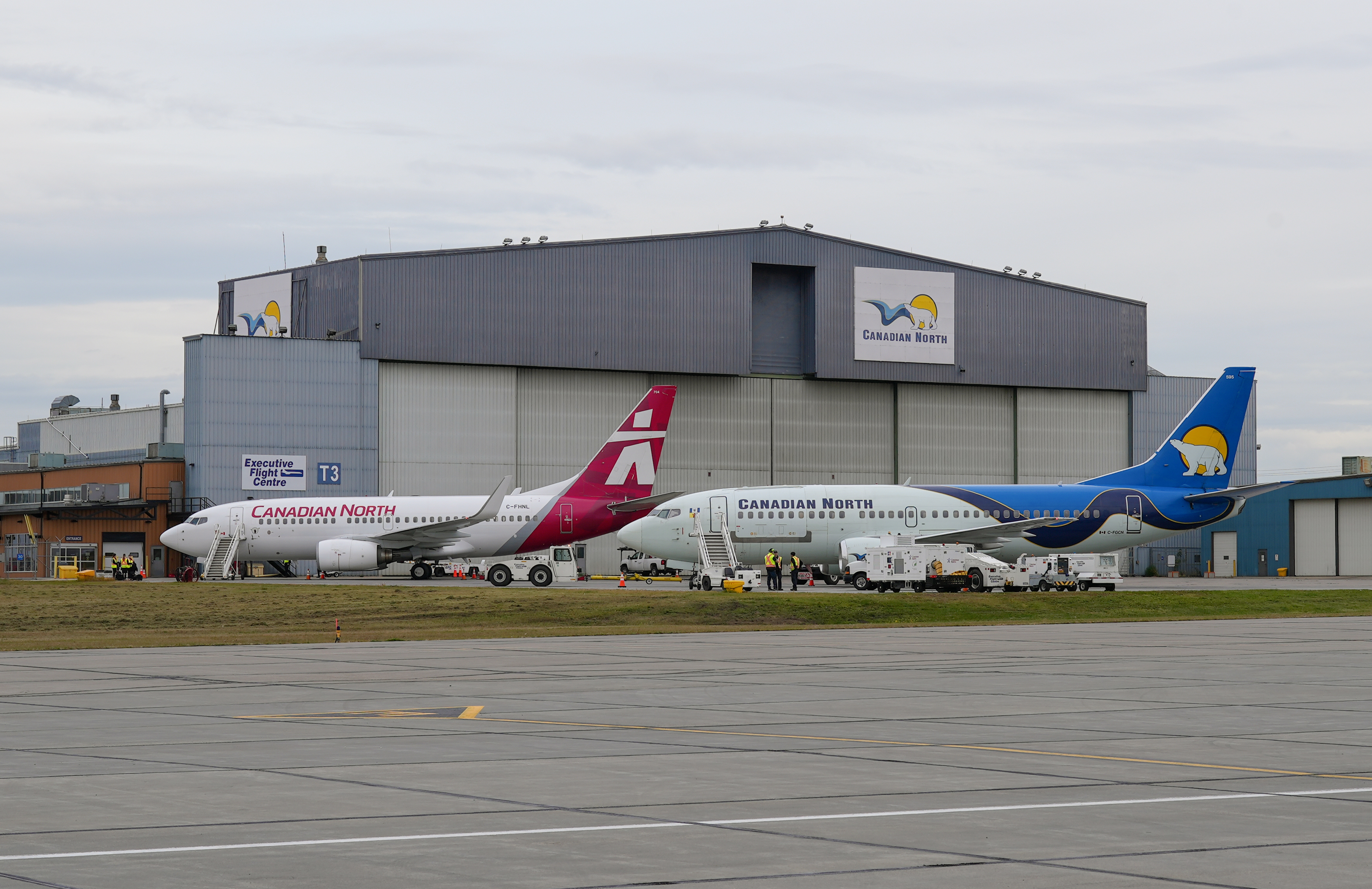
Canadian North's YEG facility

Edmonton-based Flair Airlines maintains its headquarters and operational offices at Edmonton International Airport. Ontario-based Canadian North maintains its operations facilities at EIA.

=== Private and corporate aviation ===
Private aviation companies Aurora Jet Partners and Airco Aircraft Charters are headquartered at the airport.

=== Alberta Aviation Council ===
The Alberta Aviation Council, a non-profit group that represents the aviation and aerospace industries in Alberta, is headquartered at the airport.

=== Other facilities ===
The Premium Outlet Collection EIA outlet mall is located at the airport. Construction officially began in spring 2016 on the 39,800 m^{2} (428,000 sq ft) shopping mall and opened on May 2, 2018. The mall features over 100 outlet stores, with many of them making their Canadian debut. Adjacent to the mall are a business park and hotels.

The RedTail Landing Golf Club and the Century Mile Racetrack and Casino are located on the northeast corner of the airport grounds, while the RAD Torque Raceway is located on the northwest corner.

In 2016, Aurora Cannabis announced Aurora Sky, a cannabis production facility at the airport. Construction was substantially complete by November 2018, and the facility received its Health Canada sales licence on October 17, 2018. Aurora sold the facility to Bevo in a transaction that closed on September 30, 2022. The greenhouse was repurposed for horticulture; Bevo began growing Phalaenopsis orchids at the Edmonton facility in 2023.

=== Petition to rename ===
The idea to rename Edmonton International Airport as Edmonton Max Ward International Airport, in honour of Edmonton native Maxwell W. Ward, was first conceived by aviation enthusiast Bill Powell, following Ward's death in November 2020. Powell was 13 years old the first time he wrote to Max Ward, former bush pilot and founder of Canadian airline Wardair, after his first Wardair flight, and is leading the push to rename the airport in honour of the aviation legend.

On November 6, 2020, a Change.org petition was launched by Western Aviation News to rename Edmonton International Airport as Edmonton Max Ward International Airport. And an official Canadian House of Commons petition was also launched by Powell on February 2, 2021, and sponsored by Mike Lake, Member of Parliament for Edmonton—Wetaskiwin.

On August 29, 2022, Edmonton International Airport officially transitioned from EIA to YEG using the YEG acronym from the IATA identifier of the airport as part of the official name.

== Statistics ==
=== Top destinations ===
Top domestic routes from YEG (as of 1 July 2025)
Rank	Destinations	Flights per week	Carriers
1	Toronto–Pearson, Ontario	132	Air Canada, Flair, Porter, WestJet
1	Vancouver, British Columbia	132	Air Canada, Flair, WestJet
3	Calgary, Alberta	90	Air Canada, Air North, WestJet
4	Winnipeg, Manitoba	39	Flair, WestJet
4	Kelowna, British Columbia	39	Flair, WestJet
5	Abbotsford, British Columbia	32	Flair, WestJet
6	Montréal, Quebec	28	Air Canada, Porter
7	Ottawa, Ontario	26	Porter, WestJet
8	Victoria, British Columbia	25	Flair, WestJet
10	Yellowknife, Northwest Territories	21	Air Canada, Canada North, Air Tindi, WestJet

Busiest international routes from YEG (2024)
Rank	Airport	Passengers	Carriers
1	Las Vegas, Nevada	175,589	WestJet
2	Denver, Colorado	164,775	United, WestJet
3	Amsterdam, Netherlands	111,541	KLM
4	Los Angeles, California	105,926	WestJet
5	Phoenix–Sky Harbor, Arizona	104,693	WestJet
6	Minneapolis/St. Paul, Minnesota	99,762	WestJet
7	Cancún, Mexico	80,769	Air Canada, WestJet
8	Seattle, Washington	77,379	Alaska, WestJet
9	Puerto Vallarta, Mexico	86,244	WestJet
10	Atlanta, Georgia	55,789	WestJet

=== Annual traffic ===
In 2025, the airport handled 8,140,815 passengers, comprising 7,439,721 terminal passengers and 701,094 passengers using fixed-base operators (FBOs). The domestic, transborder and international figures below cover terminal passengers.

Annual passenger traffic
Year	Total passengers	% change	Domestic	% change	Transborder	% change	International	% change
2010	6,089,099	Steady	4,725,577	Steady	1,003,813	Steady	359,709	Steady
2011	6,277,137	▲3.0%	4,814,157	▲1.9%	1,085,466	▲8.1%	377,514	▲5%
2012	6,676,857	▲6.3%	5,109,637	▲6.1%	1,174,294	▲8.2%	392,926	▲3.9%
2013	7,697,995	▲15.2%	5,312,226	▲4.0%	1,264,796	▲7.7%	406,207	▲3.4%
2014	8,240,161	▲7.4%	5,500,592	▲3.5%	1,372,669	▲8.5%	459,260	▲13.1%
2015	7,981,074	▼3.1%	5,526,985	▲0.5%	1,228,134	▼10.5%	525,801	▲14.5%
2016	7,628,507	▼4.4%	5,636,112	▲2.0%	916,674	▼25.4%	474,132	▼9.8%
2017	7,807,384	▲3.8%	6,023,658	▲6.9%	879,833	▼4.0%	474,139	Steady
2018	8,254,121	▲5.8%	6,395,357	▲6.3%	967,371	▲9.9%	467,501	▼1.4%
2019	8,151,532	▼1.2%	6,236,525	▼2.5%	970,895	▲0.4%	449,652	▼3.8%
2020	2,628,891	▼67.7%	1,923,722	▼69.2%	209,154	▼78.5%	161,181	▼64.2%
2021	2,793,581	▲6.3%	2,247,159	▲16.8%	49,114	▼76.5%	59,958	▼62.8%
2022	5,849,674	▲109.4%	4,676,738	▲108.1%	429,941	▲775.4%	273,667	▲356.4%
2023	7,499,163	▲28.2%	5,694,510	▲21.8%	737,613	▲71.9%	485.296	▲77.5%
2024	7,921,918	▲5.6%	5,751,754	▲1.0%	946,626	▲28.3%	522,038	▲7.5%
2025	8,140,815	▲2.8%	6,108,016	▲6.2%	803,995	▼15.1%	527,710	▲1.1%

== Ground transportation ==
=== Bus ===
Edmonton Transit Service (ETS) provides express service between the Edmonton International Airport and Century Park station, facilitating connections to the Edmonton LRT system and other transit services. Route 747 runs between 4:10 a.m. and midnight every 30 minutes most times of the day. The route was launched in 2012 and uses buses that are equipped with luggage racks. Route 747 requires a separate fare from the rest of the transit system due to its funding arrangement; a ticket vending machine is located inside the airport terminal.

Leduc Transit provides daily service on Route 10 between the airport and the city of Leduc.

Sundog Tours provides coach service from Jasper National Park via Edmonton, Edson, and Hinton.

=== Car ===
The airport is accessible from the Airport Road interchange on Alberta Highway 2 south of Edmonton.

== Appearances in media ==
The airport is the subject of the 2016 reality series Airport: Below Zero produced by History (Canadian TV channel).

== Accidents and incidents ==
- On January 2, 1973, a Boeing 707-321C CF-PWZ of Pacific Western Airlines, on a cargo flight carrying 86 cattle from Toronto, Ontario, with five crew members on board, was on approach to runway 30. Visibility was poor with blowing snow, and turbulence, causing the aircraft to strike the ground 1.6 km (1 mi) short of runway 30. Hitting trees, power-lines and a gravel ridge, the aircraft erupted into fire. All crew members were killed in the crash along with the cattle, and the aircraft was damaged beyond economic repair. The investigation found that a combination of factors lead to the crash. Including weather, approaching without a glideslope, and pilot fatigue. No probable cause was stated in the report.
- On November 6, 2014, Air Canada Express Flight JZA8481, operated by Jazz Aviation with a Bombardier DHC-8-402 (registration C-GGBF), departed Calgary for Grande Prairie with 71 passengers and four crew members. A right main landing gear tire failed during takeoff. Strong crosswinds prevented a return to Calgary, and the flight diverted to Edmonton. The right main landing gear collapsed after touchdown, causing the right propeller blades to strike the runway. A fragment penetrated the cabin wall, and three passengers sustained minor injuries. All occupants evacuated the aircraft.
