= Premium Outlet Collection EIA =

Premium Outlet Collection Edmonton International Airport
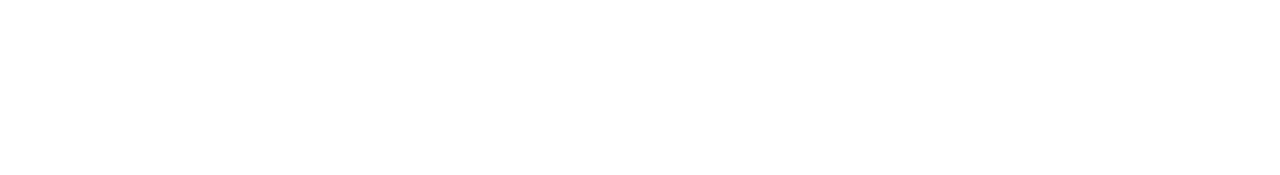
- Location: Leduc County, Alberta, Canada
- Coordinates: 53°18′08″N 113°33′13″W
- Address: 1 Outlet Collection Way, Edmonton International Airport
- Opened: May 2, 2018; 8 years ago
- Developer: Ivanhoé Cambridge and Simon Property Group (Premium Outlets)
- Manager: Ivanhoé Cambridge and Simon's Premium Outlets
- Owner: Ivanhoé Cambridge and Simon Property Group
- Num. of stores: ~100
- Num. of anchor tenants: 6
- Floor area: 39,800 m^{2} (428,000 ft^{2})
- Floors: 1
- Public transit: 747
- Website: premiumoutlets.com

Premium Outlet Collection EIA is a 39,800 m^{2} (428,000 ft^{2}) fully-enclosed outlet shopping mall in Leduc County, Alberta, Canada, just east of Edmonton International Airport. It opened on May 2, 2018, after being delayed from fall 2017. It was developed by Ivanhoé Cambridge and Simon Property Group. The mall has around 100 retailers and the main anchors are Designer Shoe Warehouse, H&M, Nike Factory Store, Old Navy Outlet, Urban Planet (formally Forever 21), Designer Depot, and Marshalls.

== History ==
In December 2013, Ivanhoé Cambridge announced that they would be building an outlet mall, then-called "The Outlet Collection at EIA", near the Edmonton International Airport. It would be 33,000 m^{2} (350,000 ft^{2}) in size with over 85 stores and was slated to open in fall 2016. In January 2015, it was announced the mall's size was increased to 38,600 m^{2} (415,000 ft^{2}) and contain 100 stores. In spring 2015, Simon Property Group announced plans for their own outlet mall in the city's west end at the corner of Anthony Henday Drive and Stony Plain Road. However in January 2016, Simon Property Group's plans were cancelled after both companies reached a partnership deal to co-develop the mall at the airport.

A groundbreaking ceremony was held in May 2015 with construction officially beginning in spring 2016. The mall opened on May 2, 2018.
