= Alberta Highway 58 =

Highway in Alberta, Canada

Highway 58

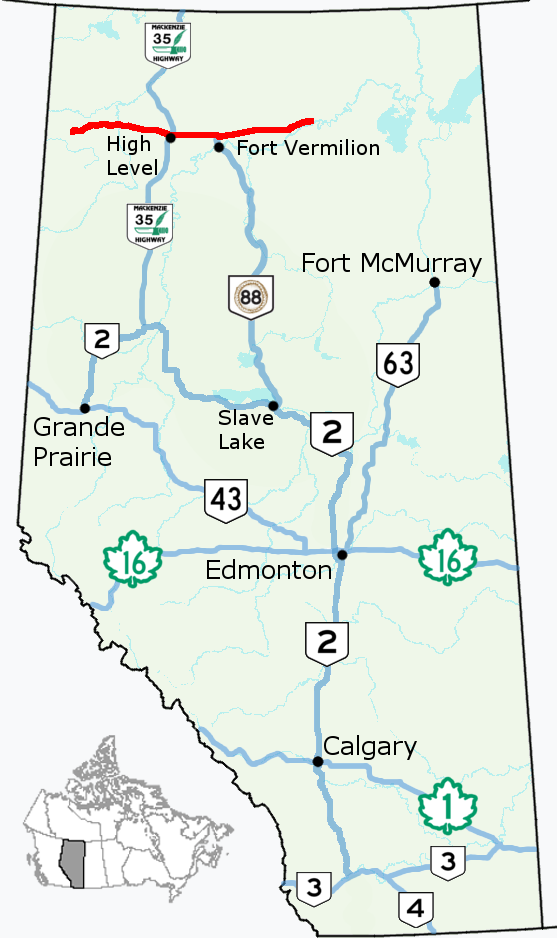
- Highway 58 highlighted in red

Route information
- Maintained by the Ministry of Transportation and Economic Corridors
- Length: 325.5 km (202.3 mi)

Major junctions
- West end: Local road near Rainbow Lake
- Highway 35 in High Level; Highway 88 near Fort Vermilion
- East end: Local road near Garden River

Location
- Country: Canada
- Province: Alberta
- Specialized and rural municipalities: Mackenzie County
- Towns: Rainbow Lake, High Level

Highway system
- Alberta Numbered Highway Network; List; Former
← Highway 56	→ Highway 59

Alberta Provincial Highway No. 58, commonly referred to as Highway 58, is an east–west highway in northwest Alberta, Canada. It starts west of the Rainbow Lake Airport and passes through the towns of Rainbow Lake and High Level before it ends at the Wood Buffalo National Park boundary west of Garden River.

As of 2010, the highway was 283 km (176 mi) in length. An extension to Wood Buffalo National Park opened on November 8, 2011, under a joint project between Government of Alberta, the Government of Canada, and the Little Red River Cree Nation (LRRCN) to construct 58 km (36 mi) of all weather roads to provide access to the LRRCN communities of Garden River and Fox Lake. The project included the 42 km (26 mi) extension of Highway 58 to its current length of 325 km (202 mi).

At its western extremity, Highway 58 continues as a winter road (commonly referred to as Border Road/Powerline Road/Sierra Road), which connects to Highway 97 (Alaska Highway) in British Columbia at Fort Nelson. At its eastern extremity, Highway 58 continues as a Garden River Road within Wood Buffalo National Park to Garden River.

The highway is designated as a Northern/Remote Route within Canada's National Highway System.

== Peace Point ==
A separate unsigned segment of Alberta Highway 58 continues as Pine Lake Road through Wood Buffalo National Park, terminating at Alberta Highway 48. The junction at Peace Point continues as an unsigned segment and winter road of Alberta Highway 59 Moose Island road and winter Highway to Fort Chipewyan.

== Major intersections ==
The entire route is in Mackenzie County.

Location	km	mi	Destinations	Notes
Rainbow Lake	0	0.0		
High Level	140	87	Highway 35 south – Peace River	West end of Highway 35 concurrency
High Level	141	88	Highway 35 north – Hay River	East end of Highway 35 concurrency
	197	122	Highway 88 south – Fort Vermilion, La Crete, Slave Lake	
John D'Or Prairie	261	162		
Wood Buffalo National Park	325	202	Garden River Road – Garden River	Wood Buffalo National Park park boundary; continues east
1.000 mi = 1.609 km; 1.000 km = 0.621 mi: Concurrency terminus
