= Oil reserves in Canada =

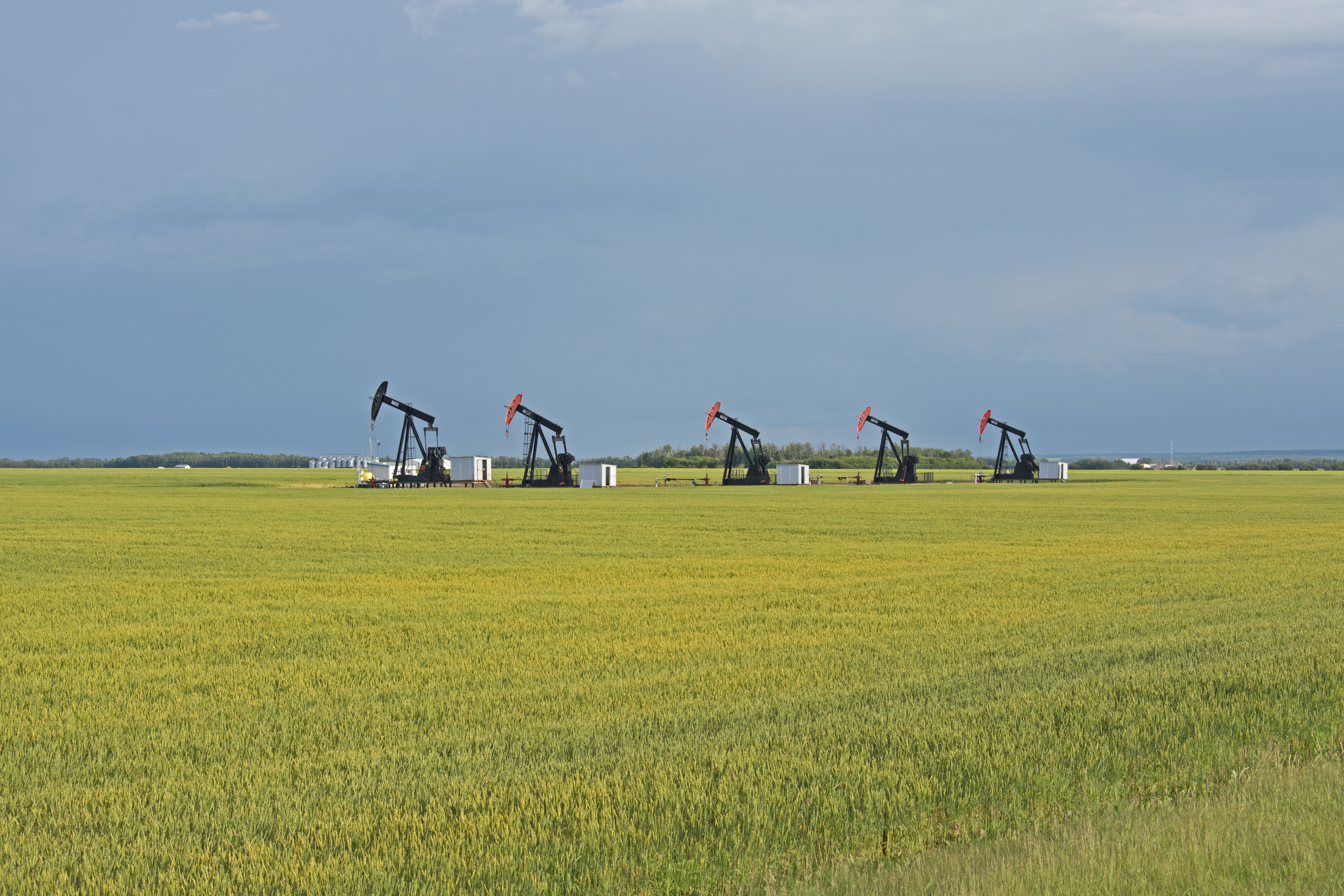
Oil pumps next to Falher, Alberta

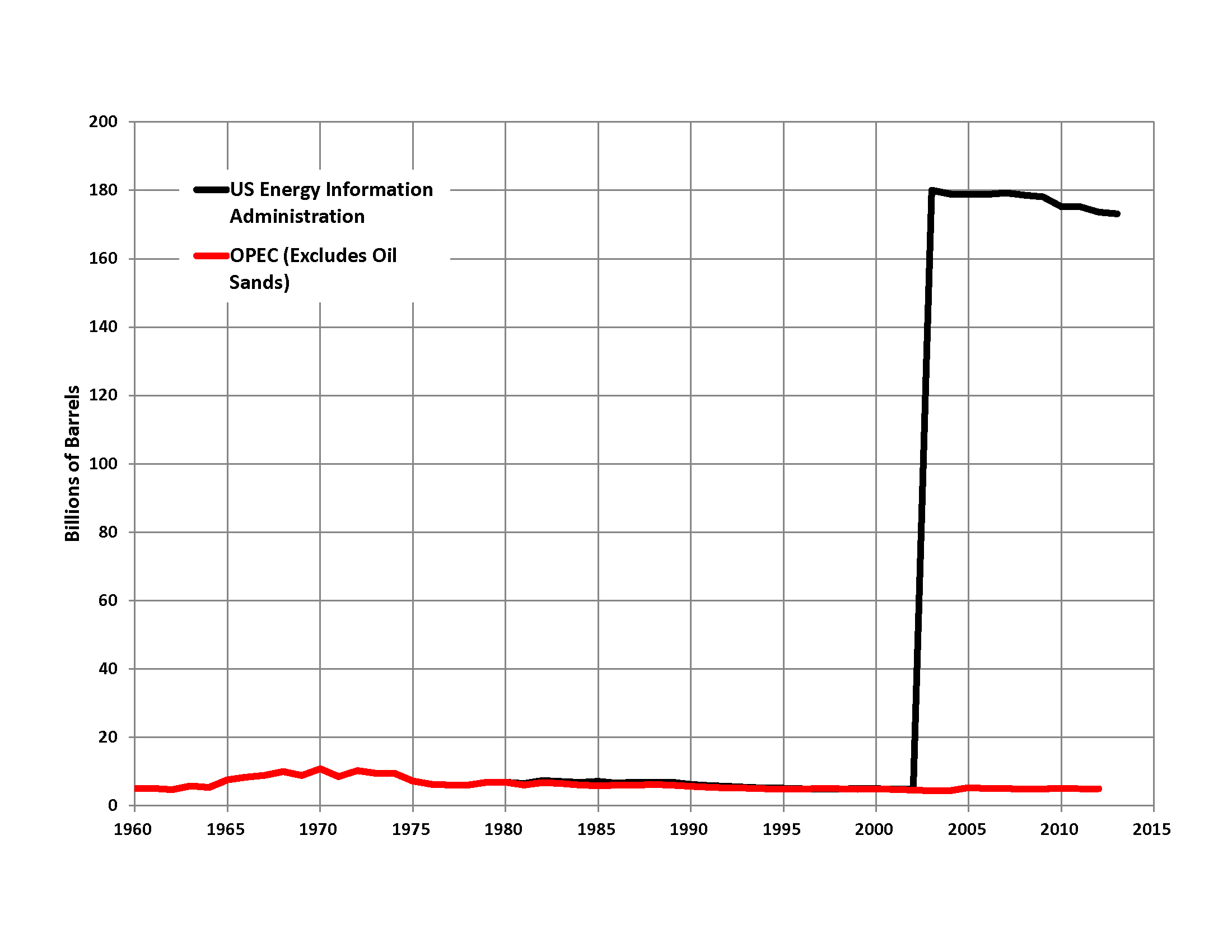
Canada proved oil reserves: conventional crude oil in red (data from OPEC) and total proved reserves including from oil sands in black (data from US Energy Information Administration)

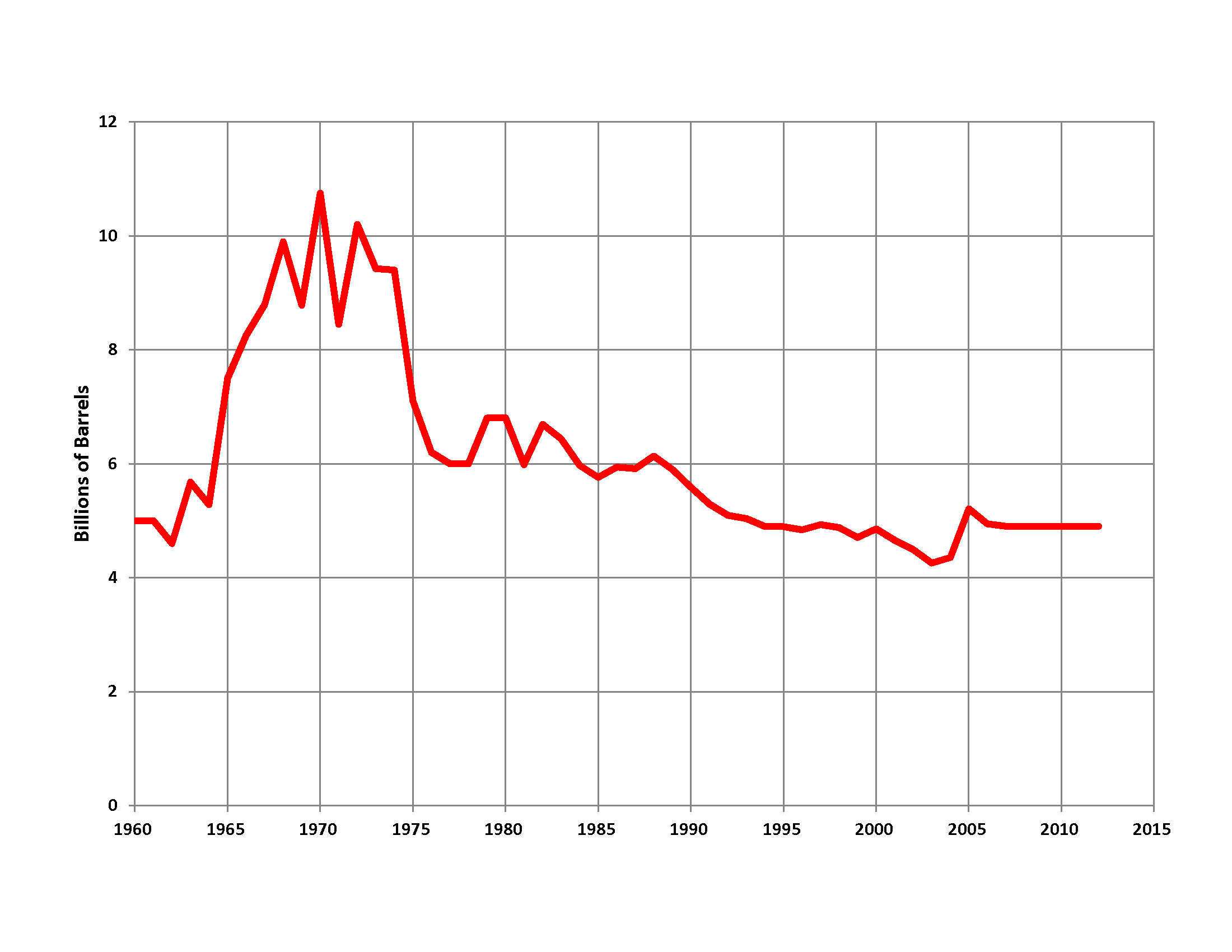
Conventional crude oil reserves in Canada (excludes condensate, natural gas liquids, and petroleum from oil sands)

Oil reserves in Canada were estimated at 172 billion barrels (27×10^{9} m^{3}) as of the start of 2015. This figure includes the oil sands reserves that are estimated by government regulators to be economically producible at current prices using current technology. According to this figure, Canada's reserves are third only to Venezuela and Saudi Arabia. Over 95% of these reserves are in the oil sands deposits in the province of Alberta. Alberta contains nearly all of Canada's oil sands and much of its conventional oil reserves. The balance is concentrated in several other provinces and territories. Saskatchewan and offshore areas of Newfoundland in particular have substantial oil production and reserves. Alberta has 39% of Canada's remaining conventional oil reserves, offshore Newfoundland 28% and Saskatchewan 27%, but if oil sands are included, Alberta's share is over 98%.

== Status ==
Canadian conventional oil production peaked in 1973, but oil sands production is forecast to increase to at least 2020

Canada has a highly sophisticated energy industry and is both an importer and exporter of oil and refined products. In 2006, in addition to producing 1.2 billion barrels (190×10^{6} m^{3}), Canada imported 440 million barrels (70×10^{6} m^{3}), consumed 800 million barrels (130×10^{6} m^{3}) itself, and exported 840 million barrels (134×10^{6} m^{3}) to the U.S. The excess of exports over imports was 400 million barrels (64×10^{6} m^{3}). Over 99% of Canadian oil exports are sent to the United States, and Canada is the United States' largest supplier of oil.

The decision of accounting 174 billion barrels (28×10^{9} m^{3}) of the Alberta oil sands deposits as proven reserves was made by the Energy Resources Conservation Board (ERCB), now known as the Alberta Energy and Utilities Board (AEUB). Although now widely accepted, this addition was controversial at the time because oil sands contain an extremely heavy form of crude oil known as bitumen which will not flow toward a well under reservoir conditions. Instead, it must be mined, heated, or diluted with solvents to allow it to be produced, and must be upgraded to lighter oil to be usable by refineries. Historically known as bituminous sands or sometimes as "tar sands", the deposits were exposed as major rivers cut through the oil-bearing formations to reveal the bitumen in the river banks. In recent years technological breakthroughs have overcome the economical and technical difficulties of producing the oil sands, and by 2007 64% of Alberta's petroleum production of 1.86 million barrels per day (296,000 m^{3}/d) was from oil sands rather than conventional oil fields. The ERCB estimates that by 2017 oil sands production will make up 88% of Alberta's predicted oil production of 3.4 million barrels per day (540,000 m^{3}/d).

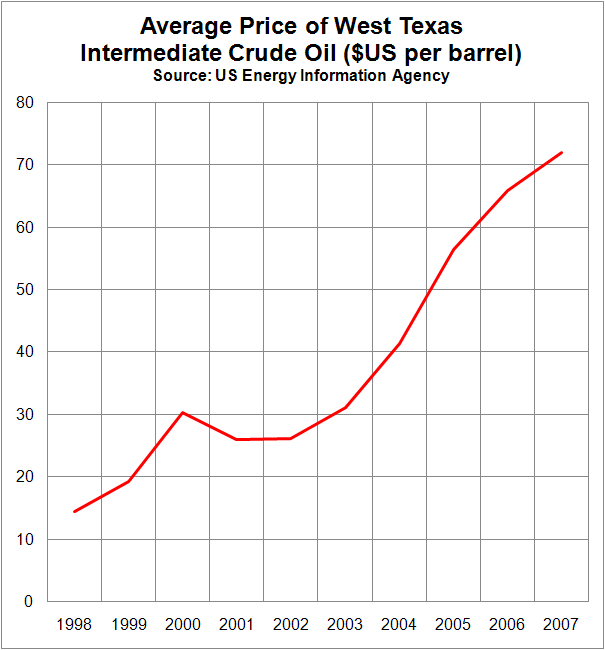
The fivefold increase in oil prices from 1998 to 2007 made Canadian oil sands production profitable.

Analysts estimate that a price of $30 to $40 per barrel is required to make new oil sands production profitable. In recent years prices have greatly exceeded those levels and the Alberta government expects $116 billion worth of new oil sands projects to be undertaken between 2008 and 2017. However the biggest constraint on oil sands development is a serious labor and housing shortage in Alberta as a whole and the oil sands centre of Fort McMurray in particular. According to Statistics Canada, by September, 2006 unemployment rates in Alberta had fallen to record low levels and per-capita incomes had risen to double the Canadian average. Another hurdle has been Canada's capacity to rapidly increase its export pipelines. The National Energy Board indicated that exporters faced pipeline apportionment in 2007. However, surging crude oil prices sparked a jump in applications for oil pipelines in 2007, and new pipelines were planned to carry Canadian oil as far south as U.S. refineries on the Gulf of Mexico.

Up until 2010 Canada was the only major oil producer in the Organization for Economic Co-operation and Development (OECD) to have an increase in oil production in recent years. Production in the other major OECD producers (the United States, United Kingdom, Norway and Mexico) at that time have been declining, as was conventional oil production in Canada. Total crude oil production in Canada was projected to increase by an average of 8.6 percent per year from 2008 to 2011 as a result of new non-conventional oil projects.

== See also ==
- Athabasca Oil Sands
- History of the petroleum industry in Canada (oil sands and heavy oil)
