= High Level Airport =

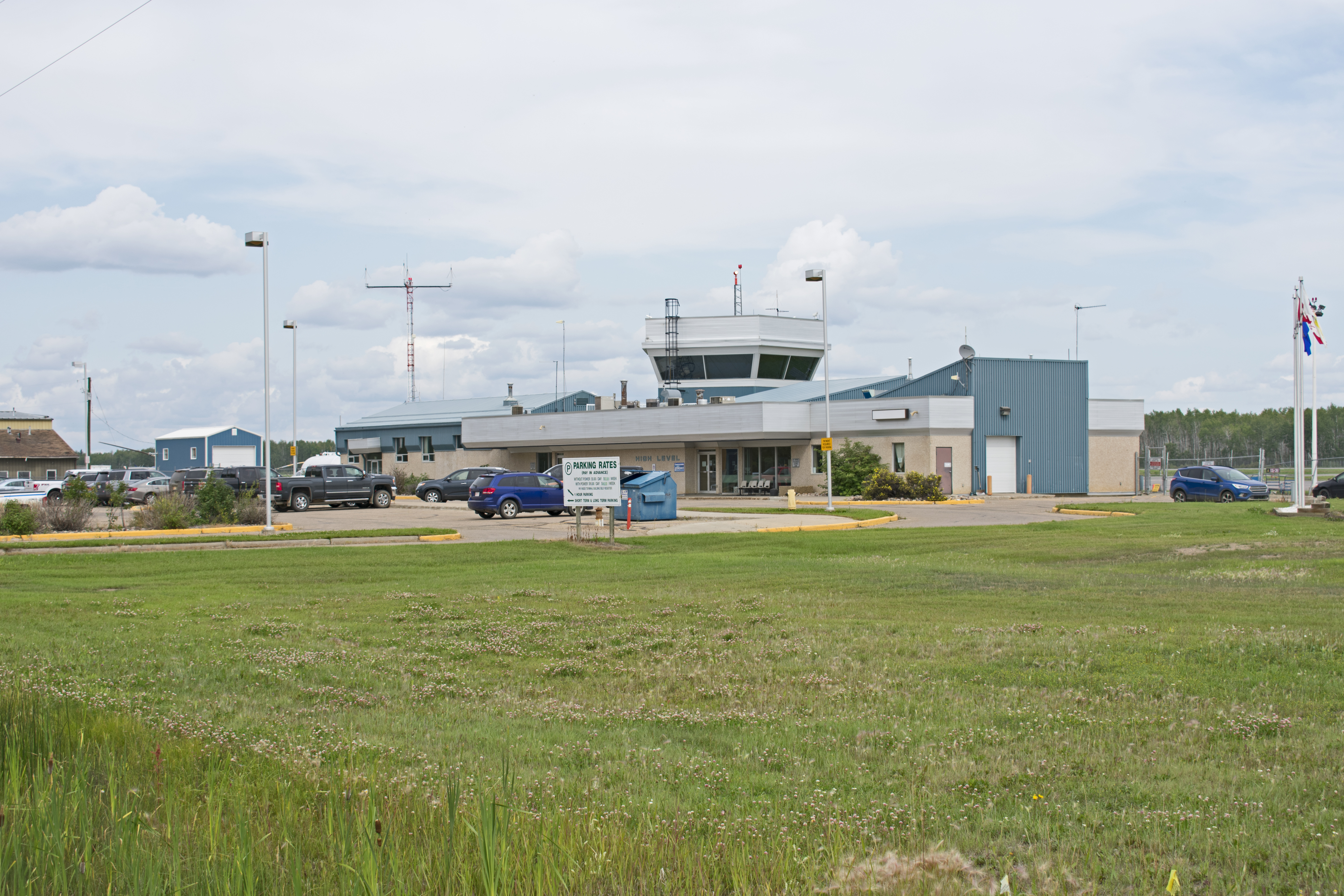
- The airport terminal
- IATA: YOJ; ICAO: CYOJ; WMO: 71066

Summary
- Airport type: Public
- Operator: Town of High Level
- Location: Mackenzie County, near High Level, Alberta
- Time zone: Alberta Time (UTC−06:00)
- Elevation AMSL: 1,109 ft / 338 m
- Coordinates: 58°37′18″N 117°09′53″W
- Website: High Level Airport

Map
- Location in Alberta CYOJ (Canada)

Runways
Direction	Length		Surface
Direction	ft	m	Surface
13/31	5,002	1,525	Asphalt

Statistics (2010)
- Aircraft movements: 13,279
- Sources: Canada Flight Supplement; Environment Canada; Movements from Statistics Canada

High Level Airport (IATA: YOJ, ICAO: CYOJ) is located 6 nautical miles (11 km; 6.9 mi) north northwest of High Level, Alberta, Canada.

== Airlines and destinations ==
Airlines	Destinations
Central Mountain Air	Edmonton

== See also ==
- High Level/Footner Lake Water Aerodrome
