= John D'Or Prairie 215 =

Coordinates: 58.5°N 115.1°W

- Indian reserve
- John D'Or Prairie Indian Reserve No. 215
- Location in Alberta
- First Nation: Little Red River Cree Nation
- Country: Canada
- Province: Alberta
- Municipal district: Mackenzie
- Headquarters: John D'Or Prairie

Area
  - Land: 171.03 km^{2} (66.04 sq mi)

Population (2016)
  - Total: 1,196
  - Density: 6.99/km^{2} (18.1/sq mi)
- Time zone: UTC−06:00 (Alberta Time)

John D'Or Prairie 215 is an Indian reserve of the Little Red River Cree Nation in northern Alberta, Canada. It is located 117 km (73 mi) east of the Town of High Level on Highway 58 and is surrounded by Mackenzie County. It is at an elevation of 282 metres (925 ft).
