= La Crete =

- Hamlet
- Location of La Crete in Alberta
- Coordinates: 58.187°N 116.405°W
- Country: Canada
- Province: Alberta
- Census division: No. 17
- Specialized municipality: Mackenzie County

Government
  - Type: Unincorporated
  - Reeve: Josh Knelsen
  - Governing body: Mackenzie County Council: Jacquie Bateman; Peter F. Braun; Cameron Cardinal; David Driedger; Eric Jorgensen; Joshua Knelsen; Anthony Peters; Ernest Peters; Walter Sarapuk; Lisa Wardley

Area (2021)
  - Land: 17.61 km^{2} (6.80 sq mi)
- Elevation: 315 m (1,033 ft)

Population (2021)
  - Total: 3,856
  - Density: 218.9/km^{2} (567/sq mi)
  - Municipal census (2024): 4,010
- Time zone: UTC−06:00 (Alberta Time)
- Forward sortation areas: T0H 2H0, T0H 4H0
- Area codes: 780, 587, 825
- Highways: 697

La Crete (/ləˈkriːt/ lə-KREET), also spelled La Crête, is a hamlet in northern Alberta, Canada, within Mackenzie County. It is located on Highway 697, approximately 57 kilometres (35 mi) southeast of High Level and 701 kilometres (436 mi) north of Edmonton.

The hamlet is in Census Division No. 17 and in the federal riding of Peace River—Westlock.

The name "La Crête" means "the ridge" in French, which is how the earliest settlers described the area they settled.

== History ==
La Crete was first settled in 1914 as La Crête Landing. When the first Mennonites arrived in the 1930s, they settled a short distance southwest of the original settlement on the current site of La Crete. When the first highways were built into the area in the 1960s, the population began to increase as new settlers arrived, and in 1979, La Crete was declared a hamlet.

== Geography ==
The Hamlet of La Crete is west of Highway 697, mostly between Township Road 1060 and Township Road 1062 (109 Avenue). Lake Tourangeau is adjacent to the hamlet to the northwest.

== Demographics ==
Population history of La Crete
Year	Pop.	±%
1961	277	—
1966	246	−11.2%
1976	349	+41.9%
1981	479	+37.2%
1986	689	+43.8%
1991	902	+30.9%
1991A	909	+0.8%
1996	1,215	+33.7%
2001	1,783	+46.7%
2006	2,166	+21.5%
2011	2,408	+11.2%
2016	3,396	+41.0%
2021	3,856	+13.5%
The 2006 and 2011 population counts are the sum of the La Crete urban area/population centre and the La Crete designated place. Source: Statistics Canada

La Crete's population was 4,010 in Mackenzie County's 2024 municipal census.

In the 2021 Census of Population conducted by Statistics Canada, La Crete had a population of 3,856 living in 1,329 of its 1,397 total private dwellings, a change of 13.5% from its 2016 population of 3,396. With a land area of 17.61 km^{2} (6.80 sq mi), it had a population density of 219.0/km^{2} (567.1/sq mi) in 2021.

The residents of La Crete typically speak English or German.

== Attractions ==
La Crete has walking trails that were paved using donations from local residents. There is a Mennonite Heritage Village sited on "10 acres of land homesteaded by Henry H. Peters in 1950".

The La Crete Lumber Barons are a Junior "B" ice hockey team who are a member of the Northwest Junior Hockey League They play their home games at Raymond Knelsen Arena

== Government ==
A ward boundary bisects the Hamlet of La Crete, which results in it having representation on Mackenzie County Council by two councillors. Ward 3, which is west of 99 Street, is represented by Peter Braun, while Ward 4, which is east of 99 Street, is represented by David Driedger.

== Transportation ==
During the summer months the La Crete Ferry, also known as the Tompkins Landing Ferry, one of only six ferries still operating in Alberta, shuttles vehicles across the Peace River on Highway 697 about 70 kilometres southwest of the hamlet. In the winter, an ice bridge is maintained at the same spot. This access connects La Crete to the Mackenzie Highway near Paddle Prairie, offering a considerable time saving when travelling to or from La Crete. During the spring and fall, when the river is unfit for the ferry and the ice too thin to support vehicle traffic, or at other times when the ferry is not operational, travellers must continue north to High Level, then east on Highway 58 before coming back south to reach La Crete. In the summer of 2006 a sandbar formed in the centre of the river, where the ferry normally crossed, forcing it to travel around it. The sandbar has grown to such a size that the ferry does not always run if the water level is too low.

== Notable people ==
- High Valley, country music band

== See also ==
- List of communities in Alberta
- List of designated places in Alberta
- List of hamlets in Alberta
