= Fox Lake 162 =

Coordinates: 58°27′13″N 114°30′58″W

Fox Lake 162 ᒪᑫᓯᐤ ᓵᑲᐦᐃᑲᐣ makêsiw sâkahikan
- Indian reserve
- Fox Lake Indian Reserve No. 162
- Location in Alberta
- First Nation: Little Red River Cree
- Treaty: 8
- Country: Canada
- Province: Alberta
- Specialized municipality: Mackenzie
- Community: Fox Lake

Area
  - Total: 10,438.3 ha (25,794 acres)

Population (2016)
  - Total: 2,032
  - Density: 19.47/km^{2} (50.42/sq mi)
- Time zone: UTC−06:00 (Alberta Time)

Fox Lake 162 (Cree: ᒪᑫᓯᐤ ᓵᑲᐦᐃᑲᐣ, makêsiw sâkahikan) is an Indian reserve of the Little Red River Cree Nation in Alberta, located within Mackenzie County. Centered on the unincorporated community of Fox Lake, it is 13 kilometres northwest of Little Red River.
