= Wardair =

Airline of Canada (1952–1990)

Wardair Canada Incorporated
IATA	ICAO	Call sign
WD	WDA	WARDAIR
- Founded: 1952
- Commenced operations: June 6, 1953
- Ceased operations: January 15, 1990 (merged into Canadian Airlines)
- Hubs: Edmonton International Airport
- Frequent-flyer program: Reward
- Fleet size: 30+
- Destinations: 26
- Headquarters: Edmonton, Alberta, Canada
- Key people: Max Ward

Wardair Canada was a privately run Canadian airline, founded by Max Ward in 1952 under the name Wardair Ltd, before formally changing its name to "Wardair Canada" in 1976. The airline was acquired by and merged into Canadian Airlines in 1990.

== History ==
In 1946, Maxwell W. Ward founded the Polaris Charter Company in Yellowknife, NWT. In 1952 the airline was formed as Wardair and operations began on 6 June 1953 using a single engine de Havilland Canada Otter. In 1962, it entered the trans-atlantic charter market and changed its name to Wardair Canada Ltd. On January 1, 1976, the name was changed to Wardair Canada (1975) Ltd and yet again on June 10, 1977, to Wardair International Ltd.

Wardair provided domestic service in Quebec, Manitoba, Ontario, British Columbia, and Alberta, as well as international service to Europe, the United States, and several Caribbean and South American countries. On March 31, 1989, the Canadian Transportation Agency approved the sale of Wardair to Canadian Airlines International.

Wardair had its roots in the air charter business in the Yukon and the Northwest Territories. From a modest start as Polaris Charter Company in the mid 1940s operating small bi-planes such as the De Havilland DH.83 Fox Moth. With service as a passenger and cargo charter company, the airline expanded into the more populous regions of Canada. And from 1962 onward, was transformed into a holiday charter airline.

Wardair was not a discount airline but an airline providing good service at lower-than-average prices. They were known for high quality meals and friendly staff. "Steak & Champagne" flights was a popular advertising tag line in the 1980s, and won various awards from magazines for their service (Holiday Which? magazine charter airline of the year 1985, and scheduled carrier of the years 1986 and 1987). Flight attendants served food on Wardair-branded Royal Doulton china on tray-table tablecloths on the passenger tray. The seats featured generous pitch.

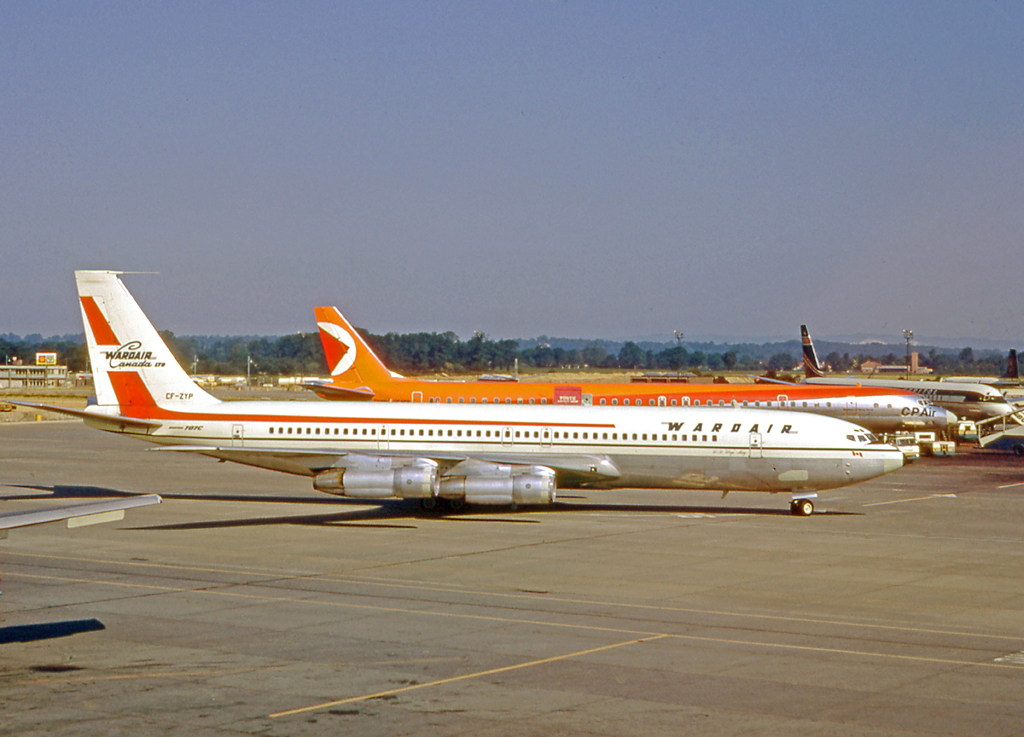
This Wardair Boeing 707, seen at London's Gatwick Airport, served the airline from 1969 until 1978.

The operations from the early 1950s were small bush-type runs based in Edmonton, Alberta, and Yellowknife, NWT. Wardair's first large aircraft was a four engine Douglas DC-6B propliner, leased in summer 1962, which started the airline's emphasis on charter flights — to Europe in summer and to Mexico, California, etc. in winter. In 1966, the airline began operating its first jet, a Boeing 727-100 — Canada's first Boeing 727 — used to operate flights to and from Europe with a refuelling stop en route. The Boeing trijet was followed by the first intercontinental Boeing 707 (thus allowing non-stop flights to Europe) in 1968, and the first Boeing 747 jumbo jet in 1973. Although initially centred on Edmonton, many long-haul flights were relocated to concentrate on Vancouver and Toronto as primary destinations, while Edmonton would continue to connect other major Canadian cities. Nonetheless, Edmonton continued to operate as a major transatlantic hub for Wardair, with flights to Prestwick, London Gatwick, Amsterdam Schiphol, and Frankfurt. Honolulu, Hawaii, became a significant winter destination, with London Gatwick becoming a major summertime destination with direct flights from Vancouver, Edmonton, Calgary, Winnipeg, Ottawa, and Toronto.

In 1970, the mainline fleet consisted of two 707s and one 727. By 1980, the fleet had grown to include four Boeing 747s and two intercontinental McDonnell Douglas DC-10-30 wide body jetliners. Wardair was a small but steadily growing company. In 1987, building on a fleet of seven jets, Wardair undertook a major expansion, ordering 38 jet aircraft including 14 Airbus A310s, 12 McDonnell Douglas MD-88s, and 12 Fokker 100s which represented an exponential expansion of operations that would ultimately prove to be financially unsustainable. The MD-80 and 100 jetliners were never delivered or operated by the airline.

Only the first 12 Airbus A310s had been delivered — the remaining A310s as well as all of the MD-88 and 100 deliveries were cancelled after the takeover.

The airline added scheduled passenger service to its charter service flights in 1986. Rapid expansion, problems with their computer booking system, and failure to attract business customers, who had developed customer loyalty to frequent flier programs on competing airlines, led the airline into financial difficulties, ultimately resulting in Wardair Canada being sold to Canadian Airlines (which operated as Canadian Airlines International) in 1989.

== Destinations ==
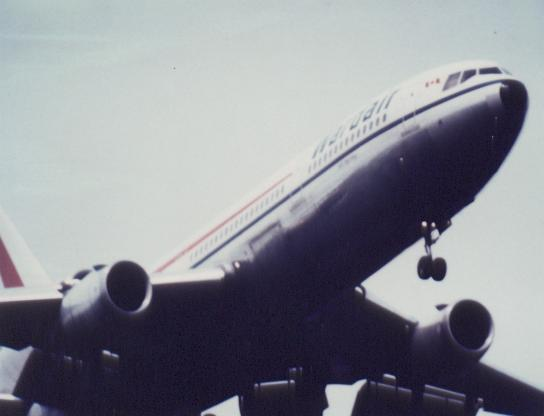
Wardair DC-10 landing

Wardair served the following destinations at various times during its existence:

=== Domestic ===
- Abbotsford, British Columbia - Abbotsford International Airport
- Calgary, Alberta - Calgary International Airport
- Coppermine River, Nunavut (formerly in the Northwest Territories) - Coppermine Airport
- Edmonton, Alberta - Edmonton International Airport
- Montreal, Quebec - Montréal–Pierre Elliott Trudeau International Airport
- Ottawa, Ontario - Ottawa Macdonald–Cartier International Airport
- Regina, Saskatchewan - Regina International Airport
- Saskatoon, Saskatchewan - Saskatoon International Airport
- Toronto, Ontario - Toronto Pearson International Airport
- Vancouver, British Columbia - Vancouver International Airport
- Windsor, Ontario - Windsor Airport (charters to Britain in the 1970s and early 1980s)
- Winnipeg, Manitoba - Winnipeg James Armstrong Richardson International Airport
- Yellowknife, Northwest Territories - Yellowknife Airport

=== International ===
- Amsterdam - Amsterdam Airport Schiphol
- Birmingham, England - Birmingham Airport
- Barbados - Grantley Adams International Airport
- Cardiff, Wales - Cardiff Airport
- Düsseldorf - Düsseldorf Airport
- Fort Lauderdale - Fort Lauderdale-Hollywood International Airport
- Frankfurt, Hesse - Frankfurt Airport
- Glasgow, Scotland - Glasgow Prestwick Airport
- Hamburg - Hamburg Airport
- Honolulu, Hawaii - Honolulu International Airport
- Leeds, England - Leeds Bradford Airport
- Liverpool, England - Liverpool John Lennon Airport
- London, England - Gatwick Airport
- London, England - London Stansted Airport
- Los Angeles - Los Angeles International Airport
- Manchester, England - Manchester Airport
- Miami - Miami International Airport
- Newcastle upon Tyne, England - Newcastle International Airport
- Paris - Orly Airport
- Seattle, WA - Renton Municipal Airport
- San Diego - San Diego International Airport
- San Juan - Isla Verde International Airport
- Stockholm - Stockholm-Arlanda Airport
- Tampa - Tampa International Airport

=== Scheduled service destinations in 1989 ===
According to its 1989 scheduled service route map, Wardair was serving the following destinations with scheduled passenger flights:

- Amsterdam, the Netherlands
- Birmingham, England, United Kingdom
- Calgary, Alberta, Canada
- Edmonton, Alberta, Canada
- London, England, United Kingdom - Gatwick Airport
- Manchester, England, United Kingdom
- Montreal, Quebec, Canada - Dorval Airport and Mirabel Airport
- Paris, France
- Prestwick, Scotland, United Kingdom
- Puerto Plata, Dominican Republic
- Ottawa, Ontario, Canada
- San Juan, Puerto Rico
- Toronto, Ontario, Canada
- Vancouver, British Columbia, Canada
- Winnipeg, Manitoba, Canada

=== Charter service destinations in 1989 ===
According to its 1989 charter service route map, Wardair was serving the following destinations with charter passenger flights:

- Barbados, West Indies
- Calgary, Alberta, Canada
- Edmonton, Alberta, Canada
- Fort Lauderdale, Florida, United States
- Fort Myers, Florida, United States
- Frankfurt, Germany
- Honolulu, Hawaii, United States
- Los Angeles, California, United States
- Montreal, Quebec, Canada - Dorval Airport and Mirabel Airport
- Orlando, Florida, United States
- Ottawa, Ontario, Canada
- Phoenix, Arizona, United States
- San Diego, California, United States
- San Francisco, California, United States
- Tampa, Florida, United States
- Toronto, Ontario, Canada
- Vancouver, British Columbia, Canada
- West Palm Beach, Florida, United States

== Historical fleet ==
- 3 Airbus A300B4-203 - 1986–1989
- 12 Airbus A310-304 - 1987-1989; 5 sold to the Canadian Forces by Canadian Airlines from 1992 and redesignated by RCAF as the CC-150 Polaris
- 2 Boeing 707 - 1968–1978 (includes B707-311C and B707-396C models)
- 1 Boeing 727-100 - 1966–1973
- 5 Boeing 747 - 1973–1989 (includes B747-100 and B747-200 models)
- 3 Bristol 170 Freighter - 1958–1977
- 2 de Havilland Canada DHC-2 Beaver - 1954–1968 (includes Turbine Beaver model)
- 5 de Havilland Canada DHC-3 Otter - 1953–1972 and 1979–1985
- 2 de Havilland Canada DHC-6 Twin Otter - 1970
- 2 de Havilland Canada DHC-7 Dash 7 - 1978–1979
- 2 Douglas DC-6B - 1962–1966
- 1 Grumman Gulfstream I
- 3 McDonnell Douglas DC-10-30 - 1978–1988
- 1 Supermarine Stranraer

=== Fleet in 1970 ===
Wardair Canada fleet in 1970
Aircraft	Total	Orders	Notes
Boeing 707-320 (B707-311C & B707-396C)	2	0	
Boeing 727-100	1	0	
Bristol Freighter	3	0	
de Havilland Canada DHC-3 Otter	1	0	
de Havilland Canada DHC-6 Twin Otter	2	0	
Douglas DC-6B	1	0	
Total	10	0	

== See also ==
- List of defunct airlines of Canada
