= Elliott River (Canada) =

Coordinates: 57.56691°N 114.03555°W

The Elliott River is a river in northern Alberta, Canada. It is a tributary of the Mikkwa River.

Elliott River has the name of Elliott Greene, a surveyor.

== See also ==
- List of rivers of Alberta
