= Little Red River Cree Nation =

First Nations government in Canada

- Band No. 447
- ᒥᐦᒁᑲᒦᐏ ᓰᐲᓯᐢ mihkwâkamîwi-sîpîsis
- People: Cree
- Treaty: Treaty 8
- Headquarters: John D'Or Prairie
- Province: Alberta

Land
- Other reserves: Fox Lake 162; John D'Or Prairie 215; Garden River
- Land area: 244.723 km^{2} (94.488 sq mi)

Population (2019)
- On reserve: 4614
- On other land: 647
- Off reserve: 681
- Total population: 5942

Government
- Chief: Conroy Sewepagaham (valid as of March 2025)
- Council: Little Red River Cree Nation

Tribal Council
- North Peace Tribal Council

Website
- lrrcn.ab.ca

The Little Red River Cree Nation (Cree: ᒥᐦᒁᑲᒦᐏ ᓰᐲᓯᐢ, mihkwâkamîwi-sîpîsis) is a First Nations band government in northern Alberta, headquartered at John D'Or Prairie.

== Indian reserves ==
There are three First Nation communities under the governance of the band:

- Fox Lake Indian Reserve 162 10438.30 ha
- Garden Creek Indian Settlement 3741 ha.
- John D'Or Prairie 215 14034 ha.

These communities were formed around 1959 to 1969. Before that time, band members followed a seasonally mobile lifestyle, hunting, gathering and trapping in extended family groups, and congregating several times a year by the Hudson's Bay Company trading post at the mouth of the Mikkwa River, formerly known as the Little Red River.

Wood Buffalo National Park is also around this region, to the northeast of John D'Or Prairie 215. Bison management is currently one of the concerns of the Cree nation: their population has declined while the community continues to depend on the animal as a food source. Many believe that the government has not sufficiently protected the bison, and that too many non-Aboriginal hunters and poachers have taken too many bison as trophies.

== Issues with wildfire ==
In 2023, nearly 100 community members, including uncertified firefighters, mustered to fight encroaching wildfires. Residents were relieved by day crews from provincial firefighting forces, but continued to stand fire watch at night. More than 100 homes and 200 structures were lost, with approximately 30 to 40 homes saved during firefighting efforts. Fires threatened the community again in 20234, and 8,600 residents were evacuated with the aid of local firefighters, using barges, boats and canoes. The province also provided helicopters equipped with night vision.

Considering future fire-related threats, the community submitted a plan for a larger, improved water plant in order to reduce boil-water advisories and ensure a water supply, supporting firefighting and wildfire prevention. Further plans include FireSmart programs to reduce fire risks by managing vegetation and preparing homes and the formation of a joint task force between the province of Alberta and the local government to manage future wildfires. One proposed initiative includes a three-levelled government program supporting the establishment of a community firefighting division. Currently, they work with other crews but do not have full control. First Nations communities across Canada often face similar issues, stuck in a jurisdictional limbo between governments where communities are under federal jurisdiction, but wildfire and emergency management are provincially managed. They are also disproportionately affected by wildfires: Indigenous people make up 5% of Canada's population, but make up 42% of populations evacuated during wildfires.

=== Community firefighters ===
After the Indian Act was amended in 1981, Indigenous communities gained more autonomy, which included their ability to farm and reintroduce traditional practices. This change allowed Little Red River to launch a wildfire firefighting business, called Wildland Firefighters Inc. Recognized by the Province of Alberta, the business provides wildland firefighting expertise to the province and assists in firefighting across northern Alberta. Since the 1990s, they have trained 2-3 firefighters from each household in their community. However, the initiative has faced barriers. The traditional forest knowledge and practices of the community contrast with provincial firefighting protocols and this impairs individual certifications, designating many available community members as unqualified to participate in these programs.
