= John D'Or Prairie =

- Location of John D'Or Prairie John D'Or Prairie (Canada)
- Coordinates: 58°30′06″N 115°08′57″W
- Country: Canada
- Province: Alberta
- Census division: No. 17

Government
  - Type: Unincorporated
- Elevation: 290 m (950 ft)
- Time zone: UTC−06:00 (Alberta Time)

John D'Or Prairie is a First Nations settlement within the John D'Or Prairie 215 Indian reserve in northern Alberta, Canada. It is located on the Lawrence River, upstream from the Peace River, and south of the Caribou Mountains. It has an elevation of 290 metres (950 ft).

The settlement is located in census division No. 17 and in the federal riding of Peace River. The settlement and the Indian reserve are part of the Little Red River Cree Nation.

== Access ==
The settlement is accessed by the John D'Or Prairie Aerodrome and an access road that connects to Alberta Highway 58 to the north of the Indian reserve.

== Demographics ==
Statistics Canada has not recently published a population for John D’Or Prairie. However, the population of John D'Or Prairie according to the Little Red River Cree Nation is 1,062.

== See also ==
- List of communities in Alberta
- List of Indian reserves in Alberta
