= Fox Lake, Alberta =

Coordinates: 58°28′04″N 114°32′15″W

Location of Fox Lake, Alberta

Fox Lake is an unincorporated community in northern Alberta, Canada within the Fox Lake 162 Indian reserve. It is located approximately 152 kilometres (94 mi) east of High Level. The reserve is surrounded by and independent from Mackenzie County.

== Demographics ==
The population of Fox Lake according to the Little Red River Cree Nation is 1,773.

== See also ==
- List of communities in Alberta
