= List of airlines of Alberta =

This is a list of airlines of Alberta which have an air operator's certificate issued by Transport Canada, the country's civil aviation authority. These are airlines that are based in Alberta.

== Current airlines ==
Airline	Image	IATA	ICAO	Callsign	Hub airport(s) or headquarters	Notes
Air Spray			ASB		Red Deer	Aerial firefighting
AirSprint			ASP	AIRSPRINT	Calgary	Fractional ownership of aircraft
Lynx Air (Defunct Feb. 26/24)		EG	ENJ	Lynx Air	Calgary	Charter airline
Kenn Borek Air		4K	KBA	BOREK AIR	Calgary	Charters, aircraft leasing
LR Helicopters					Calgary/Springbank	Charters, flight training
McMurray Aviation					Fort McMurray	Charters, flight training
Morningstar Air Express			MAL	MORNINGSTAR	Edmonton	Cargo airline that operates a FedEx Canada contract. Example colours only; aircraft now registered to WestJet.
Nor-Alta Aviation		LT		CANWEST	Fort Vermilion, High Level	Charters and MEDIVAC (air ambulance)
Northern Air					Peace River	Charters, scheduled flights and air ambulance
R1 Airlines			TSH	TRANSCANADA	Calgary	Charter airline, aircraft leasing
Sunwest Aviation			CNK	CHINOOK	Calgary	Charters, MEDIVAC (air ambulance)
WestJet		WS	WJA	WESTJET	Calgary, Vancouver, Toronto Pearson	Low-cost carrier, scheduled passenger service. Canada's second largest airline after Air Canada.
WestJet Encore			WEN	ENCORE	Calgary	

== Defunct airlines ==
Airline	Image	IATA	ICAO	Callsign	Hub airport(s) or headquarters	Notes
Air Mikisew		V8		AURORA	Fort McMurray	1961 (as Contact Air) - 2011; Grounded in 2010 and permanently closed by 2011
Alberta Citylink			ABK	ALBERTA CITYLINK	Medicine Hat	1996 - 2004; Owned by Bar XH Air
Alta Flights			ALZ		Edmonton International	1986 - 2014; To Sunwest Aviation
Bar XH Air			BXH	PALLISER	Medicine Hat	1974 - 2010; To Integra Air
Canada West Airlines					Edmonton International	2002 - 2004
Canadian Airlines		CP	CDN	CANADIAN	Calgary	1987 - 2001; To Air Canada
Canadian Regional Airlines		KI	CDR	CANADIAN REGIONAL	Calgary	1993 - 2000; To Air Canada Jazz
Corporate Express			CPB	PENTA	Calgary	1975 - 2009
Eldorado Radium Silver Express					Edmonton/Blatchford Field, Port Radium	1935 - 1970s? To Eldorado Aviation
Globemaster Air Cargo					Edmonton/St. Albert	2003 - 2004
Holidair			STP		Edmonton	1998 - 1999
Integra Air			BXH	PALLISER	Lethbridge	1998 - 2018; Former provider of scheduled passenger service, charters
Knighthawk Air Express		4I	KNX	KNIGHT FLIGHT	Calgary	1993 - 2005
MacKenzie Air Services					Edmonton/Blatchford Field	1932 - 1942 to Canadian Pacific Airlines
Peace Air					Peace River	
QuikAir		Q9			Calgary	2001 - 2006
Skyxpress Airline			KLO	KLONDIKE	Calgary	2001 - 2008
Southern Frontier Airlines					Calgary	1978 - 1978; To Time Air
Swanberg Air					Grande Prairie	2000 - 2011; Ceased due to death of founder Sylvan Swanberg
Time Air		KI	TAF	TIME AIR	Lethbridge	1966 - 1993; To Canadian Regional Airlines
Wardair		WD	WDA	WARDAIR	Edmonton International	1952 - 1990; Started as Polaris Charter Company at Yellowknife in 1946, acquired by Canadian Airlines)
Zip		3J	WZP	ZIPPER	Calgary	2002 - 2004; Operations return to regular Air Canada routes
