= Stubb Ross =

Walter R. "Stubb" Ross, CM started the now-defunct airline Time Air near Lethbridge, Alberta, in 1966. He married his wife Margaret in 1953 and they had four children, Marjory, Lynn, Rod and Susan.

In 1967—the year after Ross started Lethbridge Air Service — Air Canada stopped service to the Lethbridge airport. As a result, his company was able to provide the service the larger company previously provided. He also oversaw the acquisitions of regional airlines North Canada Air and Southern Frontier Airlines. Ross worked in different capacities at the company — including selling tickets, loading cargo and piloting the planes — but was serving as chairman of the board when he retired in 1984. He died September 14, 1987.

Ross also served in several executive positions with the Air Transport Association of Canada, including two stints as chairman. He also received several awards, including the Order of Canada (1983), Lethbridge's Honorary citizen of the Year (1986), and Alberta Aviation Hall of Fame (1987). In addition, the main road at the Lethbridge County Airport, Stubb Ross Rd, is named after him.
