= Edmonton City Centre Airport =

Former airport in Alberta, Canada

Edmonton City Centre Airport Blatchford Field

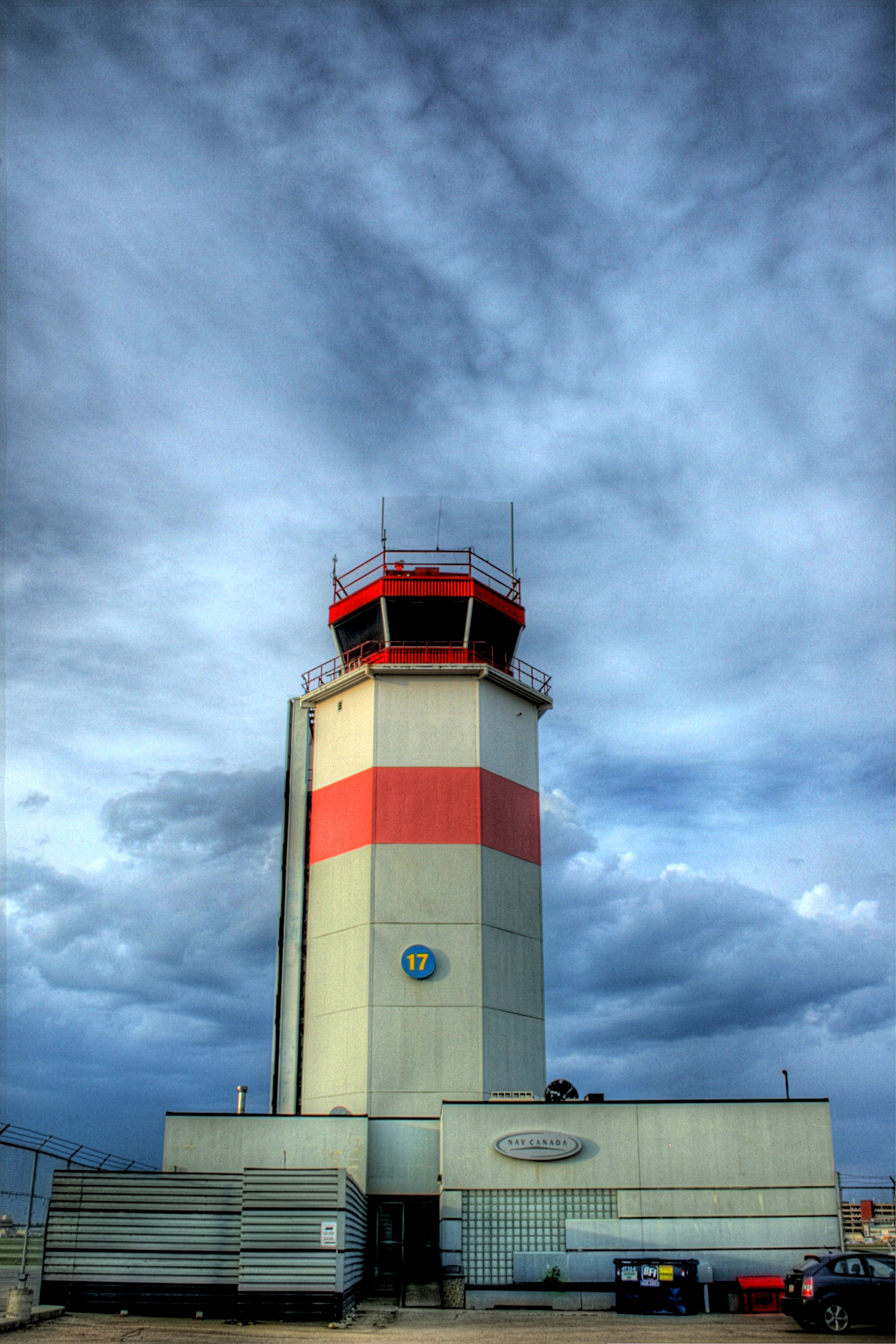
- City Centre Airport control tower in 2010
- IATA: YXD; ICAO: CYXD

Summary
- Airport type: Defunct
- Owner: City of Edmonton
- Operator: Edmonton Airports
- Location: Blatchford, Edmonton, Alberta, Canada
- Opened: 1927
- Closed: November 30, 2013
- Time zone: MST (UTC−07:00)
  - Summer (DST): MDT (UTC−06:00)
- Elevation AMSL: 2,202 ft (671 m)
- Coordinates: 53°34′19″N 113°31′10″W

Map
- Location within Edmonton

Runways
Direction	Length		Surface
Direction	ft	m	Surface
12/30	5,870	1,789	Asphalt
16/34	5,700	1,737	Asphalt

Statistics (2012)
- Aircraft Movements: 55,863
- Sources: Canada Flight Supplement; Edmonton Airports; Movements from Statistics Canada

Edmonton City Centre Airport (ECCA), (IATA: YXD, ICAO: CYXD) was an airport within the city of Edmonton, in the Canadian province of Alberta.

It was bordered by Yellowhead Trail to the north, Kingsway to the south, 121 Street to the west, and the Northern Alberta Institute of Technology (NAIT) and Jefferson armouries to the east. It encompassed approximately 58 ha (144 acres) of land just north of the city centre of Edmonton.

The airport was originally called Blatchford Field, named for former mayor Kenneth Alexander Blatchford. His son, Howard ("Cowboy") Blatchford, became a noted fighter pilot in World War II. It later was known as the Edmonton Municipal Airport, then as Edmonton Industrial Airport, and then Edmonton City Centre Airport (ECCA), finally ending as Blatchford Field at Edmonton City Centre Airport. Over the years, the IATA airport code "YXD" continued to be used for the airport by all of the airlines serving the airfield.

The airport was closed in November 2013, and as of 2018, the land was being redeveloped by the City of Edmonton as a planned community called Blatchford.

== Early history ==
The airport has a rich aviation history, being the first licensed airfield in Canada (1926). Characters such as Wop May, a World War I flying ace and bush pilot, helped pioneer aviation in Alberta and Northern Canada, further solidifying Blatchford Field as the "Gateway to the North".

Along with May, the Mayor of Edmonton, Kenny Blatchford, had played a key role in establishing the airport in 1927. Blatchford's son, Howard Blatchford, became a fighter ace in WWII.

Wiley Post landed at the airport during both of his circumnavigations.

== RCAF Station Edmonton ==
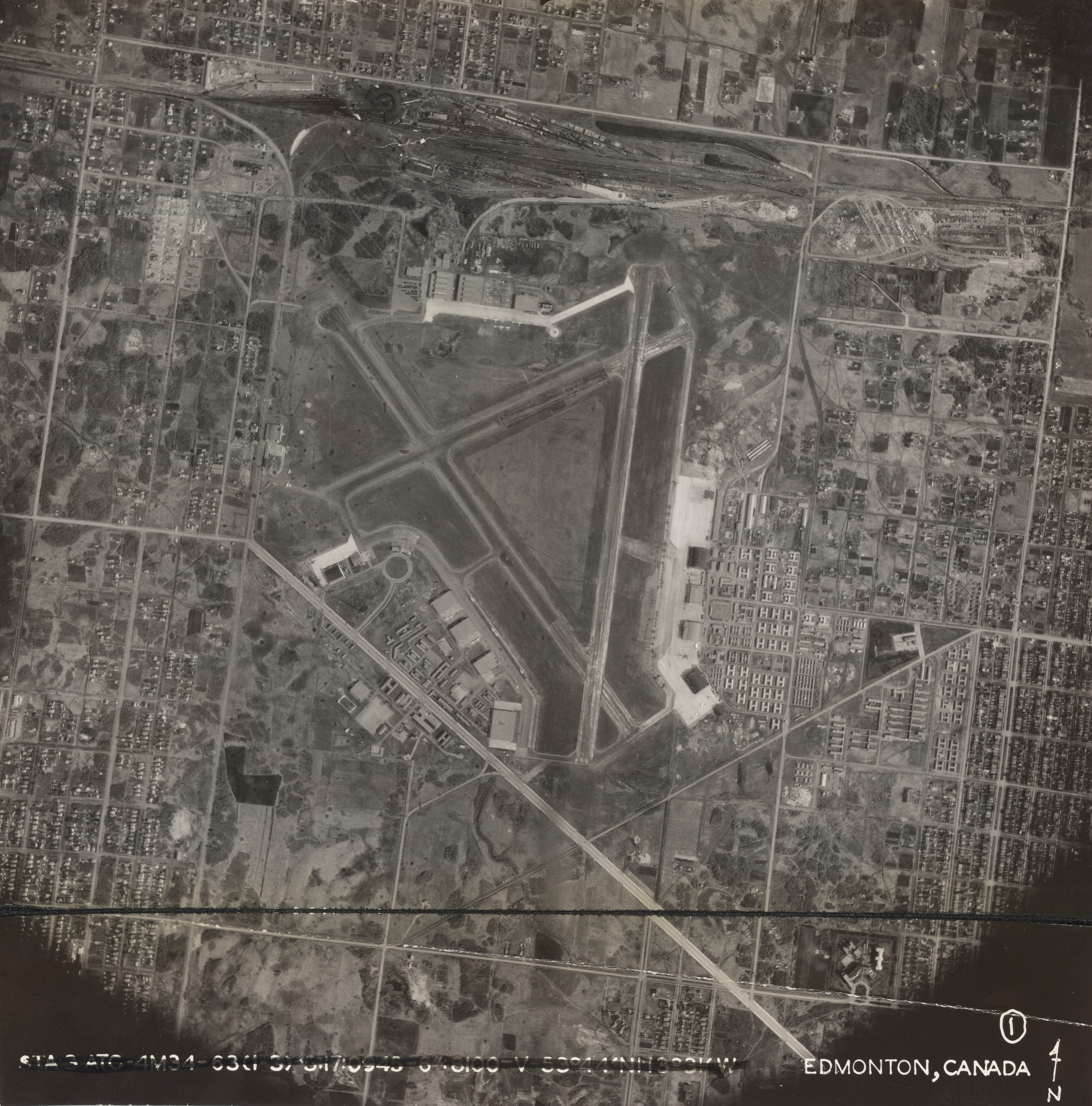
Aerial image, 1946

The airport served as a military airbase during World War II, when it was a major stop-over on the Northwest Staging Route and hosted two British Commonwealth Air Training Plan schools.

No. 2 Air Observer School (AOS), operated by Canadian Airways and Canadian Pacific Air Lines, opened at RCAF Station Edmonton on August 5, 1940. Later that year, on November 11, the Royal Canadian Air Force (RCAF) established No. 16 Elementary Flying Training School (EFTS), operated by the Edmonton Flying Club; this school was closed on July 17, 1942, to allow for an expansion of No. 2 Air Observer School. Upon winding down of the British Commonwealth Air Training Plan, No. 2 AOS was closed on July 14, 1944. On 1 October 1955, all RCAF squadrons and support units were transferred to the "new" RCAF Station Namao. Blatchford Field was turned over to the Edmonton municipal government and became the commercial Edmonton City Centre (Blatchford Field) Airport.

During this period, in about 1942, the aerodrome was listed at 53°34′N 113°31′W with a variation 25 degrees E and elevation of 2,185 ft (666 m). The facility was listed as being a Department of Transport and RCAF Aerodrome and had three runways, listed as follows:

Runway Name	Length	Width	Surface
3/21	4,500 feet (1,372 m)	200 feet (61 m)	Hard surfaced
11/29	5,700 feet (1,737 m)	200 feet (61 m)	Hard surfaced
15/33	5,700 feet (1,737 m)	200 feet (61 m)	Hard surfaced

== Weather ==
A weather station was established in 1937. Over the years since then, its site witnessed increasing influence by the urban heat island effect.

By the mid-1970s, "Edmonton Municipal A." (as it was listed in the Monthly Record of Meteorological Observations in Canada) was regularly recording some of the longest frost-free periods in the Prairie Provinces, with the first fall frost often not coming before October.

== Scheduled passenger service ==
=== 1950s and 1960s ===
In 1950, the airport was a stop on an international route operated by Northwest Airlines between the United States and Asia. According to the September 24, 1950, Northwest Airlines system timetable, the air carrier was operating Douglas DC-4 propliner service on a routing of New York City - Washington, D.C. - Chicago - Minneapolis–Saint Paul - Edmonton - Anchorage - Tokyo four days a week with continuing service to Okinawa and Manila or Taipei depending on the day of the week. By the late 1950s, three Canadian-based airlines were providing primary scheduled passenger air service at the airport: major air carriers Canadian Pacific Air Lines (which would become CP Air) and Trans-Canada Air Lines (TCA, which would become Air Canada) as well as regional air carrier Pacific Western Airlines (PWA). In 1959, Canadian Pacific was operating international service to Europe with four nonstop flights a week flown with Douglas DC-6B "Empress" propliners between Edmonton and Amsterdam with these flights originating and terminating in Vancouver and was also operating local domestic service with Convair 240 prop aircraft to Grande Prairie, Alberta and Fort St. John, British Columbia. A year earlier in 1958, Trans-Canada was flying Lockheed L-1049 Super Constellation and Canadair North Star (a Canadian produced version of the DC-4) propliners in addition to Vickers Viscount turboprops on nonstop services to Vancouver, Toronto, Winnipeg and Saskatoon as well as direct, no change of plane flights to Montreal. According to the June 1, 1958, Trans-Canada Air Lines system timetable, the air carrier was also operating five nonstop departures a day to Calgary with Viscount propjets. Pacific Western was operating regional services from the airport in 1959 with Curtiss C-46 and Douglas DC-4 prop aircraft to a number of Canadian destinations located north of Edmonton including Fort McMurray, Fort Smith, Fort Resolution, Fort Vermilion, Hay River, Inuvik, Norman Wells, Peace River, Uranium City, and Yellowknife.

By 1964, Pacific Western had expanded its domestic service from the airport with the addition of regional flights to Cambridge Bay, Coppermine (now Kugluktuk), Dawson Creek, Fort Simpson and Wrigley as well as to the Resolute Bay Airport in the Arctic which is the second most northerly destination in Canada served by scheduled airline flights. By 1968, Pacific Western had introduced the Convair 640, a turboprop aircraft (which the airline called the "Javelin Jet-Prop") on many of its flights from the airport and had also introduced its "Chieftain Airbus" shuttle service linking Edmonton and Calgary operated with Douglas DC-6 propliners with six round trip nonstop flights a day between the two cities. According to the June 24, 1968 Pacific Western system timetable, Douglas DC-6 and DC-6B passenger aircraft as well as all-cargo Douglas DC-4 aircraft were also being operated by the airline to destinations located north of Edmonton. The jet age arrived at the airport in 1969 when Pacific Western introduced Boeing 737-200 jetliners with nonstop flights to Calgary, Fort Smith and Hay River with direct, no change of plane 737 jet service to Vancouver, Yellowknife, Kamloops, Kelowna, Cranbrook, Penticton, Inuvik and Norman Wells.

=== 1970s and 1980s ===
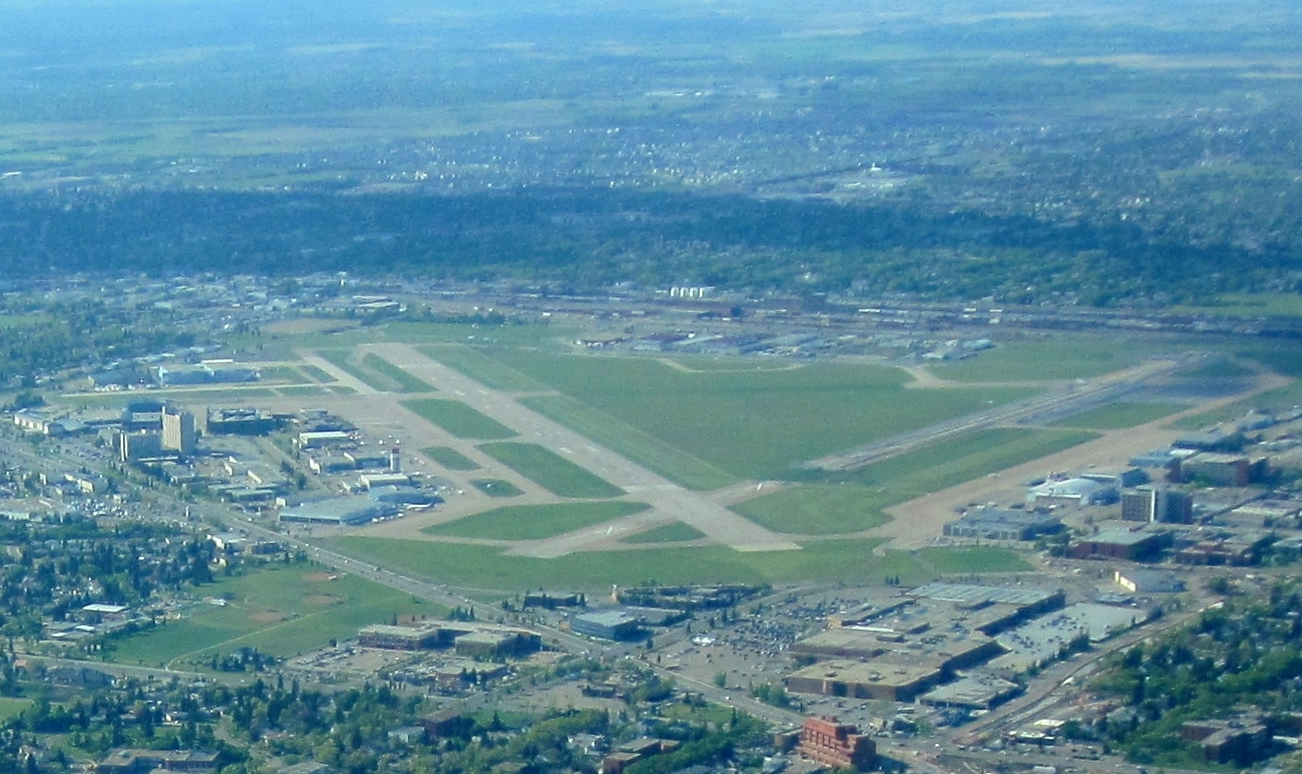
Edmonton City Centre Airport

Several types of jet passenger aircraft were operated into ECCA, notably the Boeing 737-200. As noted above, these 737 flights were initially operated by Pacific Western Airlines followed by its successor Canadian Airlines (formerly CP Air) from the initial purchase of these aircraft in the late 1960s up until the merger of Pacific Western with Canadian, with the latter continuing to operate 737 flights into the airport. Pacific Western flew its "Chieftain Airbus" shuttle service between the airport and Calgary Airport (YYC) for many years with the 737 and in 1976 was operating up to fourteen 737 200 series departures a day nonstop from ECCA to YYC in addition to operating direct 737 jet flights into the airport from British Columbia (Castlegar, Cranbrook, Dawson Creek, Kamloops, Kelowna, Penticton, Prince George, Vancouver), Alberta (Fort Chipewyan, High Level, Peace River), and Saskatchewan ((Uranium City). The runway lengths at ECCA mandated the absolute maximum performance characteristics of the Boeing 737-200 jetliner due to its weight; however, the extreme wear caused by utilizing this airfield and pushing these limits was a concern. Other jet service came in the form of the British Aerospace BAe 146-200 as Air Canada Connector flights operated by Air BC on behalf of Air Canada. McDonnell Douglas DC-9-30 jets in Air Canada livery operated briefly out of ECCA in the mid 1980s but left due to field / weight limitations. Time Air and its later brand of Canadian Regional operated Fokker F28 Fellowship twin jets, while Echo Bay Mines operated a private passenger / cargo Boeing 727-100, a combi aircraft trijet, from the field for several years. Time Air previously operated Fokker F27 Friendship, de Havilland Canada DHC-6 Twin Otter and Short 330 turboprop aircraft from the airfield during the 1970s as well as Convair aircraft (Convair CV-580, Convair CV-640), de Havilland Canada Dash 7 and Dash 8 turboprops during the 1980s. Both the Twin Otter and Dash 7 have short takeoff and landing (STOL) capabilities so runway length was not an issue for these particular aircraft types. Besides operating flights with 737 jets, Pacific Western also operated Lockheed L-188 Electra turboprop service from the airport during the mid 1970s with nonstop flights to Fort Chipewyan, Fort McMurray and Peace River in Alberta as well as direct to Fort Smith and Yellowknife in the Northwest Territories.

By early 1985, Pacific Western was operating eighteen nonstop Boeing 737-200 flights every weekday from the airport to Calgary via its "Chieftain Airbus" shuttle schedule linking the two cities. There were also two other airlines competing with Pacific Western at this time on the Edmonton - Calgary nonstop route: Air Canada operating McDonnell Douglas DC-9 Series 30 jets with two flights on weekdays and Time Air operating de Havilland Canada Dash 7 turboprops with three flights on weekdays for a combined total of 23 flights every weekday operated by the three airlines. In contrast, there were only four nonstop jet flights every weekday from Calgary to Edmonton International Airport (YEG) at this same time in 1985: one flight each respectively operated by Air Canada and CP Air and two flights operated by Pacific Western. Also in contrast at this same time, there was only one nonstop flight a day operated on the weekdays from Edmonton International to Calgary with this service being flown by CP Air. Other airlines serving ECCA as this time were Norcanair with Fairchild F-27 turboprop service nonstop from Lloydminster and direct from Saskatoon, and Southern Frontier Airlines with nonstop Beech 88 commuter turboprop service from Cold Lake. According to the April 28, 1985 Pacific Western system timetable, in addition to its nonstop flights to Calgary the airline was operating direct, no change of plane 737 jet service from the airport to the Canadian destinations of Vancouver, Toronto, Winnipeg, Regina, Saskatoon, Cranbrook, Fort McMurray, Kamloops, Kelowna and Penticton. Pacific Western had become an all-jet air carrier with a fleet of 737 aircraft at this time. Time Air was also operating nonstop flights into the airport from other locations besides Calgary in 1985 including Grande Prairie and Peace River with these services being flown with Convair 640 turboprops as well as with the Dash 7.

The airport also had service to the U.S. during the mid 1980s. In 1985, Pacific Western was operating direct, no change of plane Boeing 737-200 jet service to Seattle via intermediate stops at Calgary and Vancouver. In 1987, Continental Airlines in conjunction with Pacific Western was operating two flights a day to Texas with direct service to Dallas Fort Worth International Airport (Dallas–Fort Worth metroplex, DFW) and George Bush Intercontinental Airport (Houston, IAH). Pacific Western operated the Edmonton-Calgary portion of the service with Boeing 737-200s and passengers then transferred to Continental operated 727-100 Series jetliners in Calgary for the flights to Texas. According to the February 1, 1987 Continental timetable, the respective routings of these flights were YXD-YYC-DFW-IAH and YXD-YYC-IAH, and both services were operated with Continental flight numbers.

=== 1990s ===
By 1995, three different airlines were operating a combined total of up to 32 nonstop flights a day from the airport to Calgary according to the Official Airline Guide (OAG). Canadian Airlines International was operating flights between ECCA and Calgary with Boeing 737-200 jetliners while Time Air flying as Canadian Partner on behalf of Canadian via a codeshare agreement was operating Fokker F28 jets and Dash 8 turboprops. Air BC operating as Air Canada Connector on behalf of Air Canada via a code sharing agreement was flying British Aerospace BAe 146-200 jets and Dash 8 turboprops on the route at this same time.

== Final years (2000–2013) ==
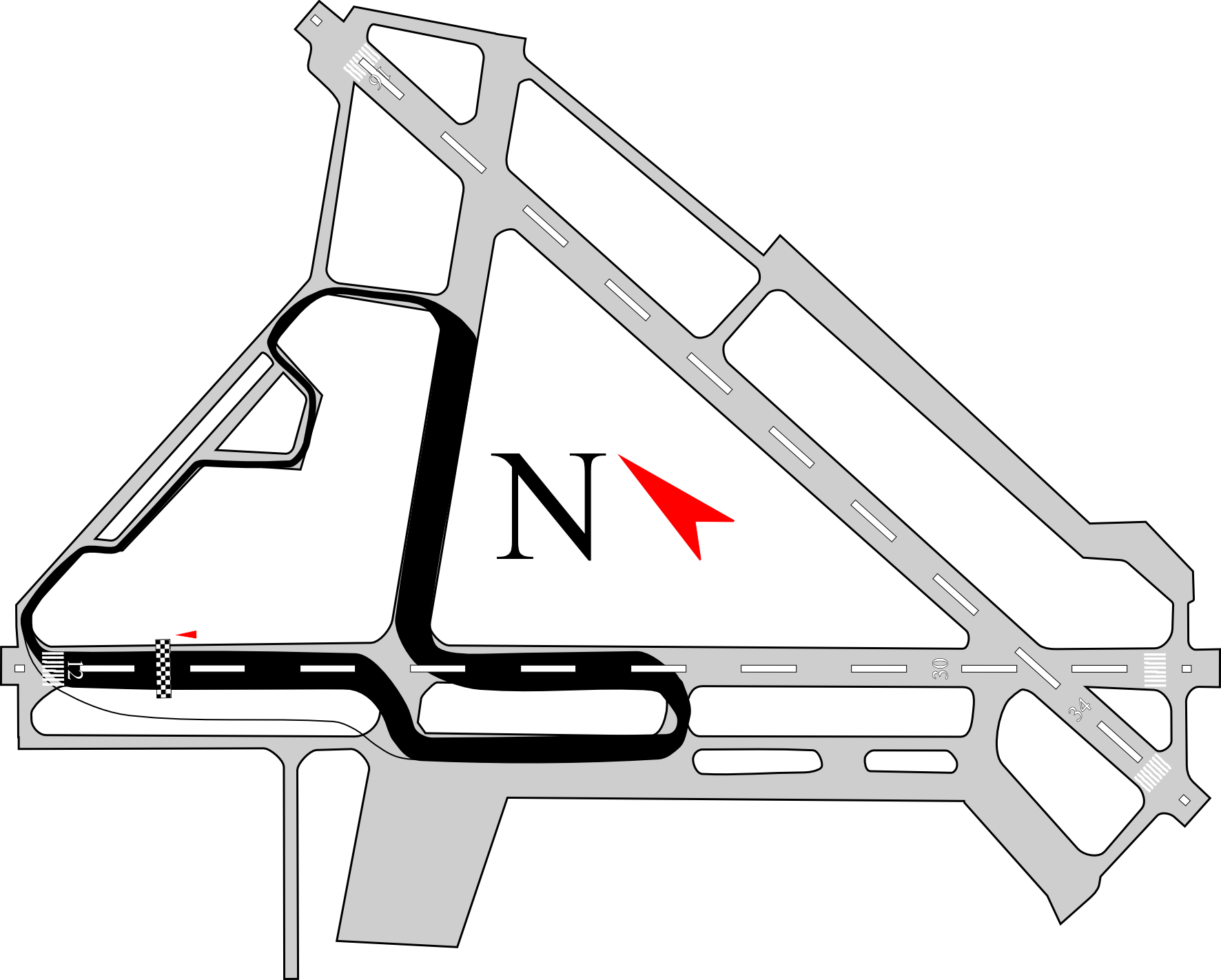
Overlay of the pre-2011 Edmonton IndyCar track on an airport map

In its final years, before closing in 2013, the airport was mainly used for air charter, general aviation, flight training and medevac (air ambulance).

In addition, from 2005 to 2012, the airport was annually converted into a race track for the Edmonton Indy Champ Car race. In 2008 Champ Car merged with the Indy Racing League, and became the IndyCar Series. The NASCAR Canada Series also raced at the speedway between 2007 and 2010, and again in 2012. Beginning with the July 2011 event, the track layout was reconfigured to use a more northeasterly section of the airport, including runway 16/34 (which had been permanently closed).

== Obsolescence and closure ==
=== Debate ===
The fate of Edmonton City Centre Airport (ECCA) was fiercely debated for decades, beginning in the 1950s.

To accommodate demands for ever-increasing range, new generations of jet aircraft became increasingly larger and heavier, resulting in the need for a longer set of runways. It became clear that it would be economically and in many cases physically impossible to accommodate modern jet aircraft at ECCA. With no ability to expand the runways, a search began for a site for construction of a new international airport. Edmonton entered into fifty years of airport debates shaped by issues of logistics, transportation, and regional disparities.

To the north of the city, a World War II military base (now CFB Edmonton) had been built at Namao by the United States Army Air Forces. In the 1950s, the base was expanded to handle Strategic Air Command military bomber aircraft, including the longest runway in Canada.

Leduc, Alberta, located 14 nautical miles (26 km; 16 mi) south by southwest of downtown Edmonton, was chosen as the site for the Edmonton International Airport (IATA: YEG, ICAO: CYEG) which opened in 1960.

It was initially decided that ECCA would be closed in 1963, upon completion of a new passenger terminal at Edmonton International. However, the issue was reexamined by consultants, and particularly in view of the unforeseen development of regional airliner service at ECCA, especially to Calgary, the City of Edmonton decided to keep ECCA open and operate both airports.

In Edmonton's 1992 municipal election, the City of Edmonton held a plebiscite, the Edmonton Municipal Airport Referendum. The result of the referendum was that Bylaw No. 10,205, which kept ECCA open to all traffic that the field could legally handle, was approved with a vote of 54%.

In the 1995 election, a second plebiscite was put forth to the citizens of Edmonton asking if the bylaw should be repealed on the basis of consolidating all scheduled traffic at Edmonton International. Determination of whether or not to close the airport was not given as an option. 77% of voters approved the proposed version, and in June 1996, the consolidation process was finalized.

After city council voted to close the airport in 2009, a group called "Envision Edmonton" organized numerous initiatives to lobby against the City Centre Airport's closure. Envision Edmonton, and other critics of the proposal, circulated a petition in 2010 which garnered over 70,000 signatures, organized protests, and supported pro-airport candidates in Edmonton's 2010 municipal election. The petition, which would have forced a municipal plebiscite on the fate of the airport, was found to fall below the requirements because less than 10% of Edmontonians signed it, and it was not filed within 60 days of city council's decision to close the airport. The petition contained approximately 100,000 signatures when it was filed, but city staff determined that almost 30,000 of them did not belong to eligible electors.

=== Closure ===
On July 8, 2009, the city council decided on a phased closure of the airport. The Alberta Aviation Museum and some non-aviation institutions were to remain, with some land transferred to Northern Alberta Institute of Technology, and the rest converted to a primarily residential development.

The north–south runway, runway 16/34, was to be the first runway closed. The closure was postponed until after the Indy and Airfest events of 2010. On August 3, 2010, runway 16/34 was closed to air traffic with a Notice to Airmen being issued at 3:00 am that morning.

Closure of the remaining runway, runway 12/30, was announced at an Edmonton City Council meeting on September 26, 2013. Licenses for scheduled air service were not renewed.

On the afternoon of November 30, 2013, the last aircraft to leave the airfield was a Cessna 172, owned and piloted by a local resident. Weather prevented a pair of CF-18 fighter jets from performing a touch-and-go landing as the ceremonial last takeoff. Shortly afterwards, ERAA placed barricades on runway 12/30 to prevent access, and markers were placed to clearly signal to pilots that it was closed.

On February 21, 2015, a Pipistrel Virus aircraft C-FCDZ flying over the site of the airport suffered a propeller failure, resulting in an unplanned landing on the airport grounds using the plane's ballistic parachute.

== Blatchford community ==
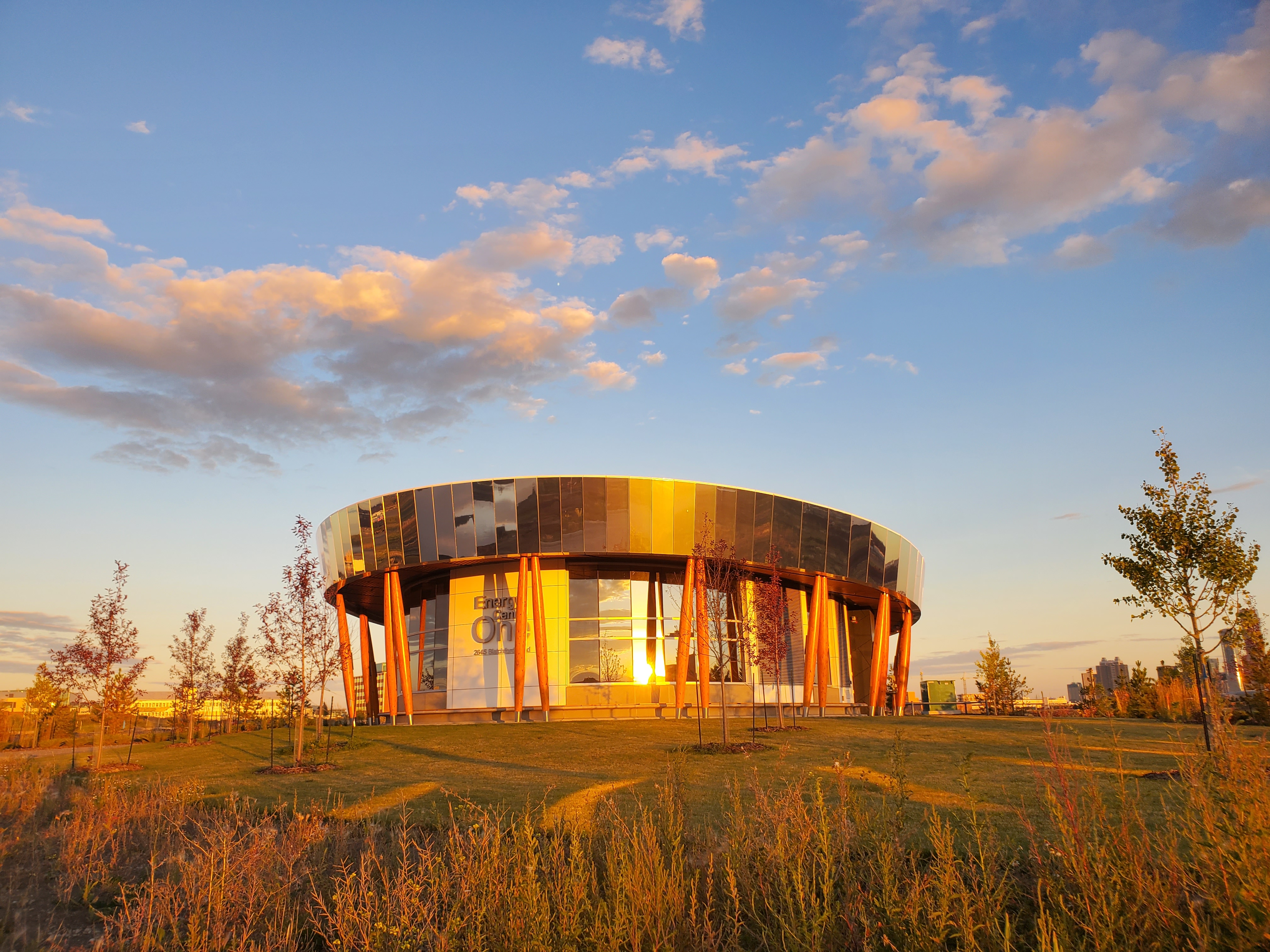
Energy Centre One, a district energy sharing system, in phase one of Blatchford, Edmonton

As of 2018, 212 ha (525 acres) of the former Blatchford Field is undergoing redevelopment into a medium- and high-density neighbourhood. In February 2019, the Northern Alberta Institute of Technology purchased 13 ha (33 acres) of land in Blatchford, as well as more land at the site of the former Westwood Transit Garage, to consolidate most of its operations at its main campus; the city of Edmonton reinvested its revenue from this sale into the development of Blatchford.

The Blatchford area will be broken into five boroughs: Blatchford West, Blatchford East, Blatchford Park, Civic Plaza, and Town Centre. Blatchford West, the first borough to be developed, will have more than 6,000 townhouses and apartments, while Blatchford East will have more than 4,000 townhouses and apartments. Blatchford Park will be around 49 ha (120 acres) in size and will include a large lake. The Town Centre and Civic Plaza will accommodate various businesses, markets, shops, and two LRT stations.

Construction is currently under way on stage one of the development, which will contain up to 500 homes. Energy Centre One, a district energy sharing system, went online in September 2019; its geo-exchange field, which contains boreholes drilled approximately 150 m (490 ft) into the earth, is located under the lake in Blatchford Park. Work to extend the Metro line of Edmonton's LRT network to Blatchford began in June 2020, and it is expected to open in 2026 or 2027. The first residents moved into Blatchford in November 2020.

In 2022, it was announced that Hangar 11, a historic building at the former airport, would be redeveloped into a mixed-use space. Planned uses include retail, commercial, restaurant, event and housing.

On April 22, 2024, Hangar 11 was destroyed by a fire.

== Airport facilities (historical) ==
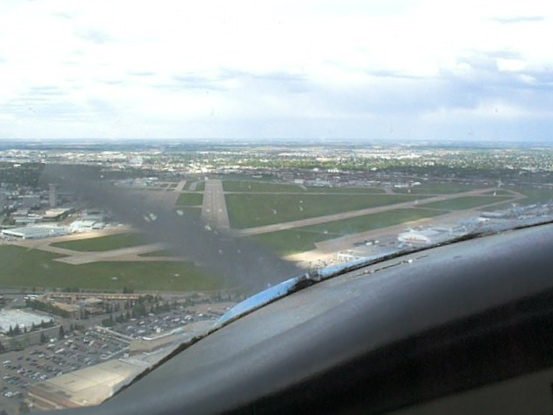
On approach, runway 30

=== Airfield and runways ===
The field elevation was 2,202 ft (671 m).

- Runway 12/30 was 5,870 by 200 ft (1,789 by 61 m). Runway 12 had an RNAV [area navigation] (GNSS [satellite navigation]) instrument approach to localizer performance with vertical guidance (LPV) minimums, and runway 30 had an RNAV (GNSS) approach to lateral navigation (LNAV) minimums.
- Runway 16/34 was permanently closed in October 2010. The former non-directional beacon (NDB) approaches to runways 16 and 34 were available to circling minimums.

Due to the airport's location in the central portion of the city, there were both curfew restrictions and noise abatement procedures. The field maintained 24/7 operations, with the strictest noise regulations in effect from 10:00 pm to 7:00 am local time.

=== Facilities and amenities ===
For private and corporate aviation, there were two fixed-base operators (FBO) on site, located on the west side of the airfield off Taxiway A.

On-site amenities included the Alberta Aviation Museum, two hotels, and a cafeteria in the Edmonton Flying Club's building.

A flight school was operated at Centennial Flight Centre.

Private air ambulances used the Esso Avitat hangar to store their ground support units. A Shock Trauma Air Rescue Service (STARS) air ambulance was also based at the airport.

Further amenities located close to the airport included shopping at Kingsway Mall, lodging at the Chateau Louis hotel, and a Via Rail train station to the north, off Bush Pilot Road. The Alberta and Edmonton office for St John Ambulance was located nearby. Proximity to the Royal Alexandra Hospital provided a link for emergency medical access by air to many of Alberta's rural communities.

== Accidents and incidents ==
One fatal accident occurred on airport grounds and four flights originating at the airport ended in fatal crashes:

- On May 24, 1934, the first and only fatal crash occurred at the airport at the end of the Empire Day Air Show. A giant Fokker monoplane piloted by M. Berry plunged downward, crashed and burst into flames. Passenger and Air Engineer Fred Hodgins, wedged in the blazing wreck, suffered injuries and later died. Pilot Berry and a third passenger, Airport Manager James Bell, were seriously injured but survived.
- On October 27, 1948, a Northwest Airlines Douglas DC-4 on its way to Alaska crashed 55 km (34 mi) north of the airport because the pilot was teaching emergency procedures to the copilot at too low an altitude, killing two out of five occupants.
- On May 26, 1955, an Associated Airways Avro York failed to clear an obstacle on takeoff and crashed northwest of the airport, killing both occupants.
- On September 17, 1955, a Pacific Western Airlines Bristol Freighter on its way to Yellowknife crashed north of Thorhild, Alberta, killing two out of six occupants. The overloaded aircraft suffered an engine failure 20 minutes after departure.
- On October 25, 2010, a Kenn Borek Air Beechcraft King Air stalled and crashed on approach to Kirby Lake Aerodrome, killing one of ten occupants.

== See also ==
- List of airports in the Edmonton Metropolitan Region
