= Walter Ross =

Walter Ross may refer to:

- Walter Ross (politician) (1817–1888), Canadian businessman and politician
- Walter Ross (boxer) (1898–?), Scottish boxer
- Walter John Macdonald Ross (1914–1982), British Army officer
- Stubb Ross (died 1987), American entrepreneur

== See also ==
- Walter Ross-Taylor (1877–1958), Scottish politician and civil servant
- Walter Ross Wade (1810–1862), American physician and planter
