= Alberta Citylink =

Airline in Alberta, Canada

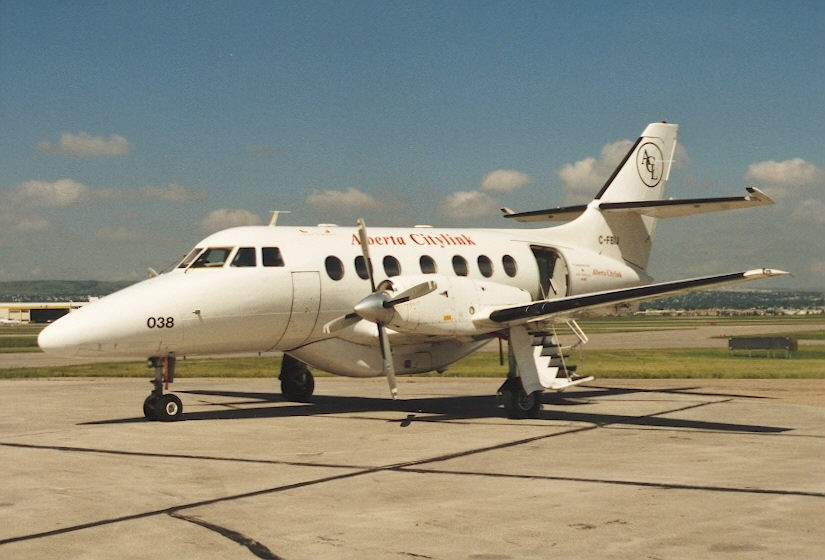
IATA	ICAO	Call sign
-	ABK	ALBERTA CITYLINK
- Founded: 1996
- Ceased operations: 2004
- Hubs: Medicine Hat Airport
- Secondary hubs: Calgary International Airport
- Fleet size: 3
- Parent company: Bar XH Air
- Headquarters: Medicine Hat, Alberta, Canada

Alberta Citylink was an airline based in Medicine Hat, Alberta, Canada. It operated domestic passenger service for Air Canada as an Air Canada Connector air carrier via a code sharing agreement. Its main base was Medicine Hat Airport, with a hub at Calgary International Airport

== History ==
The airline was established and initiated operations in 1996. Scheduled services were also operated by Bar XH Air (established in 1974) under the name Alberta Citylink. However, scheduled services are no longer operated.

== Air Canada Connector routes in 1999 ==
According to the Official Airline Guide (OAG), Alberta Citylink was operating Air Canada Connector code share services on behalf of Air Canada with BAe Jetstream commuter propjets at this time with nonstop flights between Calgary and Cold Lake, Alberta, Cranbrook, BC, Lethbridge, Lloydminster and Medicine Hat, and also nonstop between Edmonton and Cold Lake.

== Fleet ==
The Alberta Citylink fleet consisted of the following turboprop aircraft:

- 1 — BAe Jetstream 31
- 2 — BAe Jetstream 32

== See also ==
- List of defunct airlines of Canada
