= Blatchford, Edmonton =

Community being developed in Edmonton, Alberta

Blatchford
- Neighbourhood
- Location of Blatchford in Edmonton
- Coordinates: 53.572°N 113.518°W
- Country: Canada
- Province: Alberta
- City: Edmonton
- Quadrant: NW
- Ward: O-day’min
- Sector: Mature area
- Established: 2009
- Named for: Kenneth A. Blatchford

Government
  - Mayor: Andrew Knack
  - Administrative body: Edmonton City Council
  - Councillor: Anne Stevenson

Area
  - Total: 2.17 km^{2} (0.84 sq mi)
- Postal code: T5G
- Website: blatchfordedmonton.ca

Blatchford is a community being developed on the site of the decommissioned City Centre Airport in Edmonton, Alberta. With an area of 2.17 km^{2} (0.84 sq mi), Blatchford is approximately the size of Edmonton's downtown core. Edmonton City Council established the community in 2009, with a plan to make it a medium-high density neighbourhood which will rely on renewable energy and a district energy sharing system, contain two Light Rail Transit (LRT) stations, and be carbon neutral.

Blatchford was expected to take 20 years to fully develop, and ultimately accommodate 30,000 people who live, work, or study within its boundaries. The first residents did not move into Blatchford until late 2020, approximately five years after ground was broken and four years after the first homes were originally expected to be occupied. By November 2025, almost 400 residences were occupied or under construction, and the city had revised its outlook – with full occupancy of the area expected no sooner than 2042. As of November 2025, 57% of the community was under development, but this included land that was still being prepared for sale to home builders or undergoing rezoning and planning work. Having already spent $167 million preparing the land, roads, utilities and transit access (one city councilor estimated in May 2022 that the bill to-date was actually $232 million), the city was continuing to spend money constructing roads and utilities within the unbuilt portions, working on the section labeled Stage 6, which is intended to encompass 195 townhouse units. When Blatchford is completed, it is intended to be three to four times denser than Edmonton's suburban communities.

== History ==
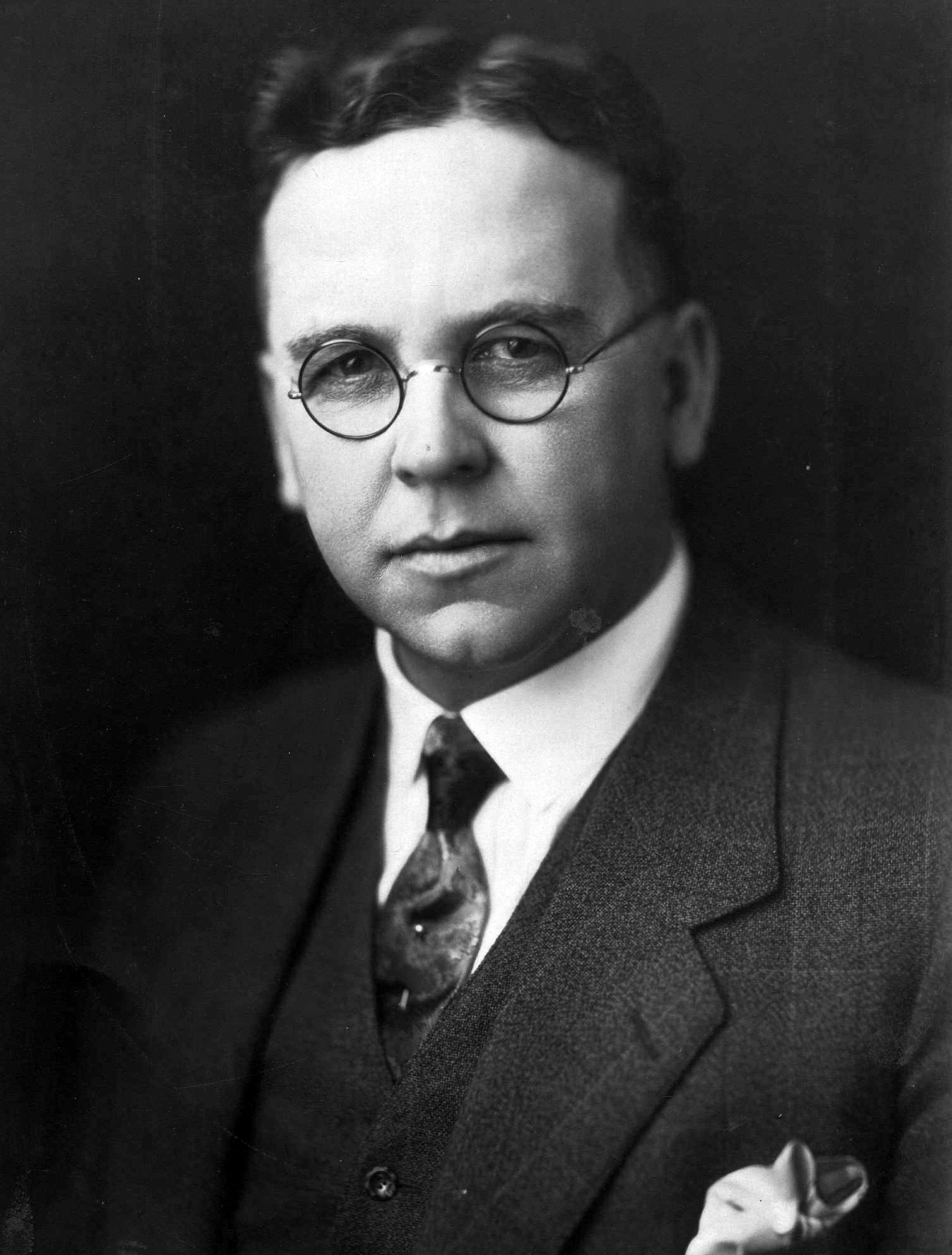
Kenneth A. Blatchford

A plan to develop a sustainable community on the grounds of the City Centre Airport was first approved by city council in 2009, when it voted to close the airport in phases. The community was named Blatchford in 2012, to honour Kenneth Blatchford, who helped to establish Blatchford Field (later the City Centre Airport) in 1926, when he was Mayor of Edmonton.

In 2011, Edmonton awarded a contract to architects Perkins + Will to design the community. However, the city scaled back the resulting plan when council gave it final approval in 2014, citing loses to the city of $280 million under the original plans. Under the revised 2014 plan, a proposed pneumatic waste collection system, and a biomass and geothermal energy system, were dropped, while the original plan for geothermal and biomass energy was replaced by a district energy sharing system, to provide renewable heating and cooling to all buildings in Blatchford. Because of these changes, the city forecast it would make a profit of $45 million from developing Blatchford.

Ground was broken on the project in 2015, as the city began work on underground utilities. As the project's developer, the city was responsible for installing roads, pipes, wires, and other core infrastructure for the community. In 2016, when residents were originally expected to move in at the earliest, the city acknowledged that the project was facing delays; in-part due to uncertainty surrounding the type of district energy sharing system that would be implemented. That year, council voted to delay the project by a year to resolve questions surrounding the energy sharing system, and to lobby the provincial and federal governments for funding. In 2019, the first plots of land in phase one were sold to four developers, with the first developer breaking ground in September, 2019. Energy Centre One, the first phase of the district energy sharing system, went online in November 2019. That same year, the Northern Alberta Institute of Technology (NAIT) purchased 13.27 hectares (32.79 acres) of land at Blatchford, to facilitate long-term plans to consolidate its operations. The first residents moved into Blatchford in November 2020.

== Layout ==
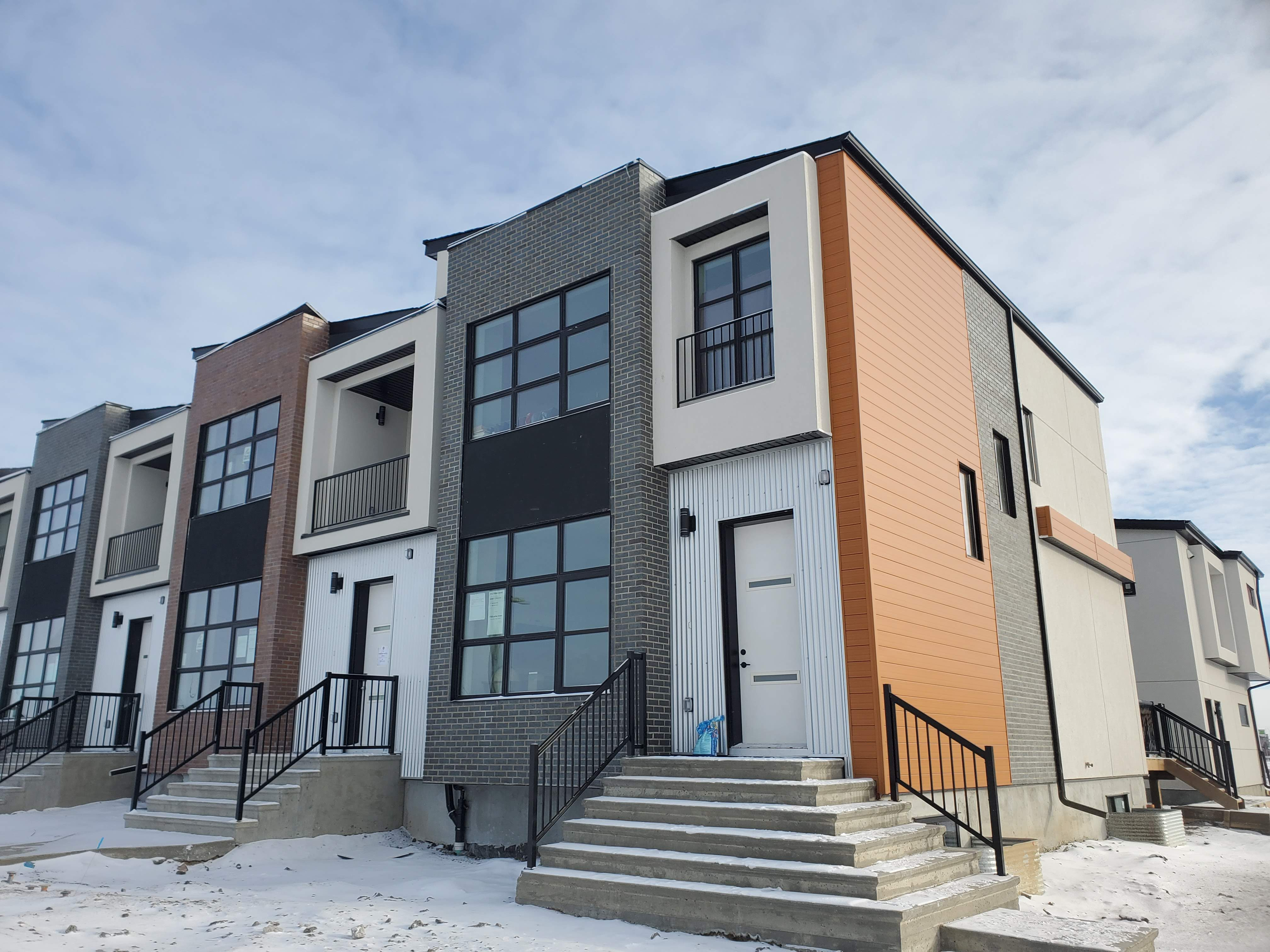
Townhouses in Blatchford

Residential development is earmarked for Blatchford West and Blatchford East, while mixed-use commercial development will be concentrated in Blatchford Market. There is a large central park near the center of the neighbourhood, and a civic plaza will be constructed around Energy Centre One. Blatchford is served by the NAIT/Blatchford Market LRT station, and a second station further north —Blatchford Gate—will open when more residents live near it.

== Sustainability features ==
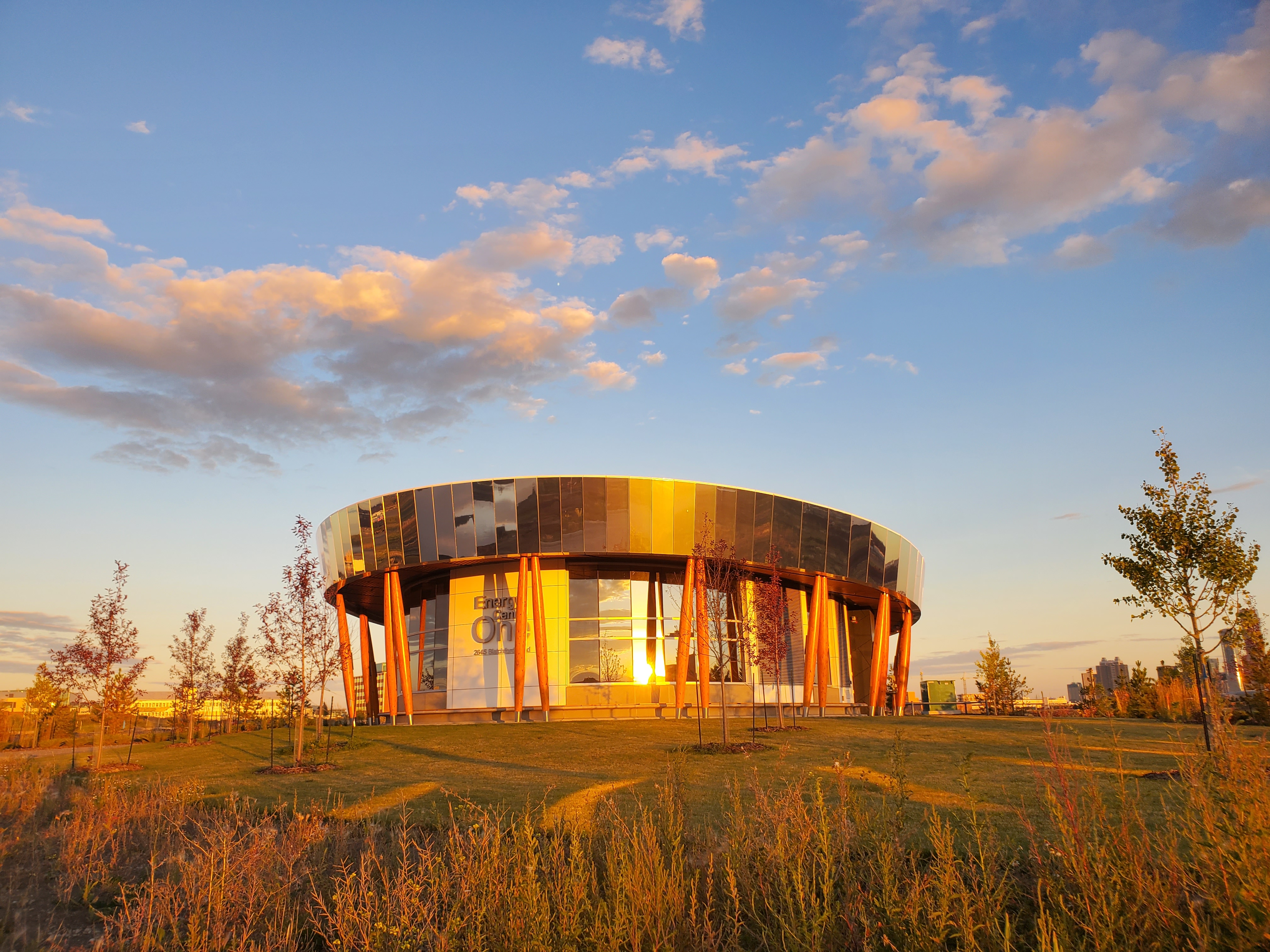
Energy Centre One

Blatchford features a district energy sharing system, which provides renewable heating and cooling to all buildings in the community. Phase one of the system, Energy Centre One, was constructed at a cost of $19.4 million. It went online in November 2019, and utilizes a geo-exchange field. The next phase will utilize sewer heat exchange using existing sewage infrastructure. Edmonton predicts that completing the next stages of the utility will require an investment of $93 million over a period of 10-15 years, and it will cost $660 million over a period of 50 years. In total, it is expected to reduce energy consumption in Blatchford by 15-20%.

Blatchford requires its builders to follow "green building codes", which it claims will make its homes up to 37% more energy efficient than what is required in provincial building codes. The community incorporates natural storm water retention methods, such as storm ponds and rain gardens, to take pressure off of its drainage infrastructure and improve water quality. Blatchford will also include urban agriculture such as community gardens and fruit tree orchards, and naturalized landscapes, including wetlands and bioswales.

== Criticisms ==
Blatchford faced opposition even before it was approved; a group called "Envision Edmonton" organized numerous initiatives to lobby against the City Centre Airport's closure. Envision Edmonton, and other critics of the proposal, circulated a petition which garnered over 70,000 signatures, organized protests, and supported pro-airport candidates in Edmonton's 2010 municipal election. The petition, which would have forced a municipal plebiscite on the fate of the airport, was found to fall below the requirements because less than 10% of Edmontonians signed it, and it was not filed within 60 days of city council's decision to close the airport. The petition contained approximately 100,000 signatures when it was filed, but city staff determined that almost 30,000 of them did not belong to eligible electors.

Perkins + Will, the firm which created the original design for Blatchford, criticized the city for scaling back sustainable features when the project was approved in 2014. They argued that the plan was made inferior by removing features such as geothermal energy and pneumatic waste collection, and that it fell short of its original goals. They further criticized the city for forcing them to defend their work at such a late stage of the planning phase.

Blatchford has faced criticisms from local developers who fear that the local condo market cannot support such a major development. Councillor Tim Cartmell echoed these concerns at a 2019 council meeting, arguing that low demand at Blatchford meant that the community could not support an expensive district energy sharing system.

== See also ==
- Mueller, a similar planned community on the site of a former airport in Austin, Texas
- Central Park, a similar planned community on the site of the former Stapleton Airport in Denver, Colorado
