= Integra Air =

Canadian regional airline

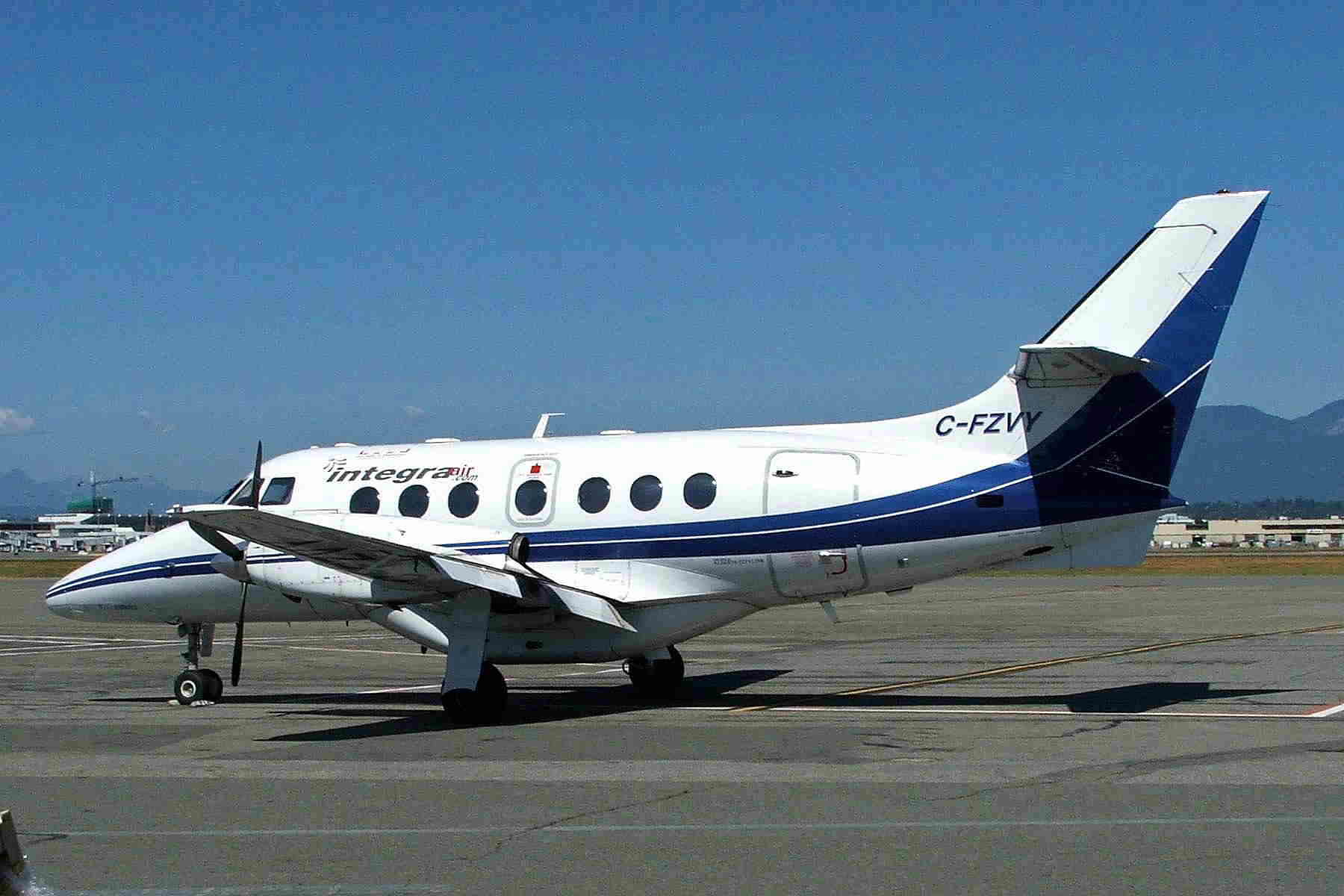
- Jetstream 32 of Integra Air
IATA	ICAO	Call sign
n/a	BXH	PALLISER
- Founded: 1998
- Ceased operations: August 31, 2018
- Focus cities: Calgary International Airport, Edmonton International Airport Lethbridge Airport, Medicine Hat Airport
- Fleet size: 10
- Destinations: 2
- Headquarters: Calgary, Alberta, Canada
- Key people: John Macek (CEO)
- Website: www.integraair.com

Integra Air offered chartered and scheduled flight services, as well as air ambulance medevac services, out of Calgary, Alberta, Canada. The airline ceased operations on August 31, 2018, stating that it was undergoing corporate restructuring. The closure also shut down operations of the air ambulance services.

== History ==
The company started in 1998 with scheduled flights to Edmonton. In 1999, Integra started its chartered service and four years later it began offering aircraft management services. In 2010, Integra Air purchased Bar XH Air, expanding their services to include air medevac. In early 2018, Calgary-based Integra Air came in to assist Orca on March 15, and in a March statement their CEO said “Integra Air is currently in the process of negotiating aircraft, crews and management to support Orca Airways and prevent any further interruption to Orca passengers and customers”.

== Destinations ==
As of April 2018, Integra Air served the following destinations, until ceasing operations.

=== Alberta ===
- Bonnyville (Bonnyville Airport)
- Calgary (Calgary International Airport)

== Fleet ==
As of April 2018, Integra Air had the following aircraft registered with Transport Canada, listed under BAR XH Air:

- 5 BAe Jetstream 31
- 4 King Air 200
- 1 IAI Westwind

The listing also includes a Cessna 150 and a Cessna 172, both with cancelled certificates.

== See also ==
- List of defunct airlines of Canada
