= Time Air =

Regional airline of Canada (1969–1993)

IATA	ICAO	Call sign
KI	TAF	TIME AIR
- Founded: 1966 (as Lethbridge Air Service)
- Commenced operations: 1969
- Ceased operations: April 1993 (merged into Ontario Express to form Canadian Regional Airlines)
- Hubs: Calgary; Edmonton–City; Edmonton–International; Vancouver
- Focus cities: Saskatoon
- Frequent-flyer program: Canadian Plus
- Parent company: Canadian Airlines International
- Headquarters: Lethbridge, Alberta
- Founder: Stubb Ross

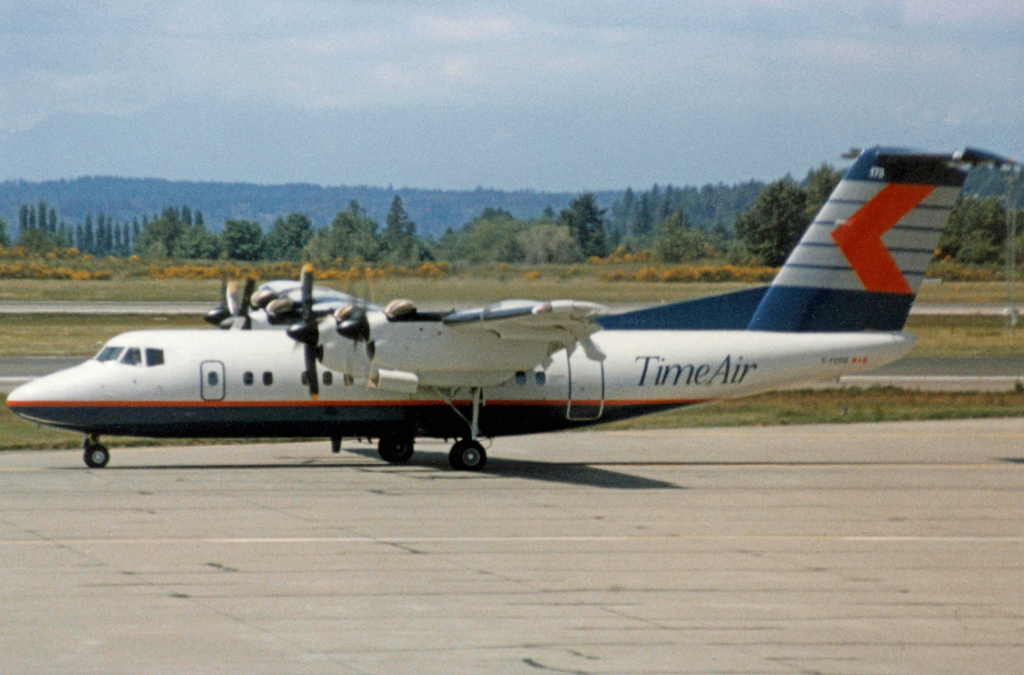
Time Air DHC-7 Dash 7 arriving at Seattle–Tacoma International Airport in 1989.

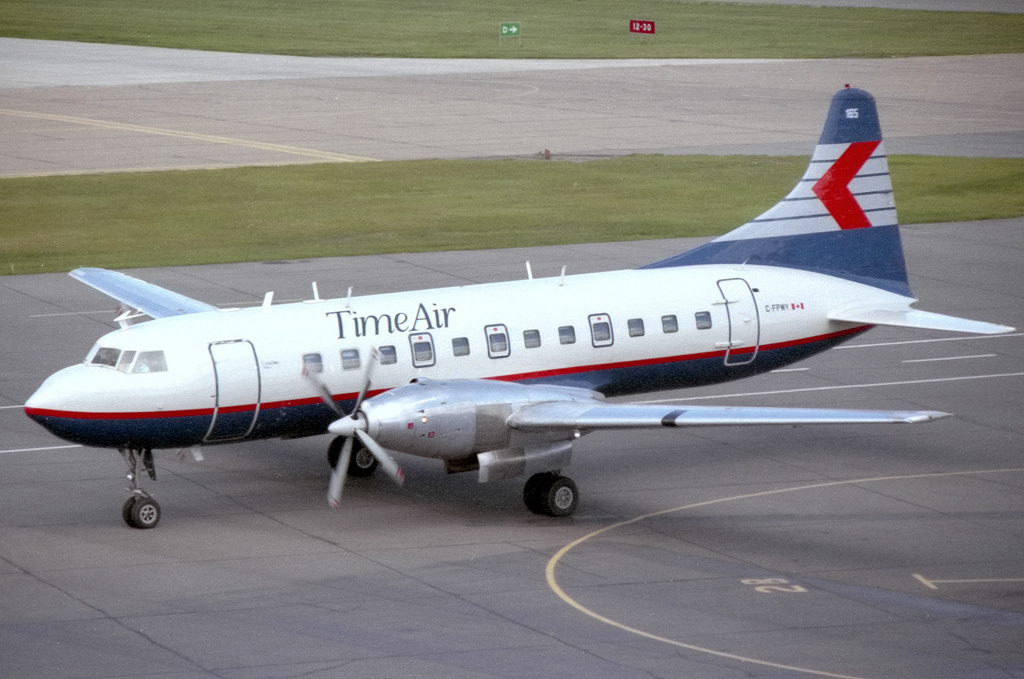
Convair CV-640

Time Air was an airline in Canada founded in 1966 by businessman Walter “Stubb” Ross from Lethbridge, Alberta. It was called Lethbridge Air Service before becoming Time Airways Ltd. in 1969, which was later shortened to Time Air Ltd. In 1993 it was merged with Ontario Express to create Canadian Regional Airlines.

== History ==
Time Air began with "Stubb" Ross flying the aircraft and picking up passengers from their Lethbridge homes. The airline was initially based at the Lethbridge Airport. Time Air quickly filled a void that was left in southern Alberta when Air Canada ceased flying Vickers Viscount turboprop service from Lethbridge nonstop to Calgary and directly to Edmonton in the early 1970s. Over the next 20 years Time Air's fleet progressed from the 20-passenger de Havilland Canada DHC-6 Twin Otter, to the 30-passenger Short 330. Time Air was the first airline to operate the Short 330 (known as the "Flying Boxcar" for their boxy shape) The airline also operated Fairchild F-27 turboprops. The next addition was the 50-passenger de Havilland Canada DHC-7 Dash 7 before standardising with the Bombardier DHC-8 Dash 8. It received the first stretched Dash 8 Series 300 aircraft in the world on February 27, 1989. The 36-passenger Short 360 was introduced next for shorthaul flying in British Columbia, primarily between Vancouver and Victoria. The airline acquired a number of other scheduled carriers, most notably Calgary-based Southern Frontier Airlines and Saskatoon-based Norcanair. As a result, Time Air briefly operated other aircraft types, including a number of Convair CV- 580 and Convair CV-640 turboprops. Time Air also flew Fokker F28 Fellowship twin jet aircraft. F28 jet operations were very successful, leading the airline to acquire a number of additional aircraft, eventually becoming the world's largest operator of the type at the time. By 1999, Fairchild Swearingen Metroliner commuter propjets as well as F28 jets and Dash 8 turboprops were being operated on Canadian Regional code share flights into Calgary.

Canadian Airlines International (formed when Pacific Western Airlines took over CP Air) acquired a minority interest in Time Air in the late 1980s and acquired 100% ownership in January 1991. At the same time Canadian Airlines International created a holding company called Canadian Regional Airlines to manage its investments in Time Air and other regional carriers (which included Ontario Express and Inter-Canadien).

In April 1993 Canadian Regional Airlines branded the operations of Time Air and Ontario Express as "Canadian Regional Airlines" with both airlines using Canadian Airlines International two letter "CP" code for their flight numbers via a code sharing arrangement. In 1995, Time Air was operating Canadian Airlines Partner code share passenger feed service. Time Air and Ontario Express were legally amalgamated in July 1998, using Time Air's air operator certificate. By then Inter-Canadien had become a wholly owned subsidiary of Canadian Regional Airlines, although it continued to operate as a separate brand. Canadian Regional Airlines was merged into Air Canada Jazz in 2001, following Air Canada's acquisition of Canadian Airlines International.

== Destinations in 1970 ==
According to its October 25, 1970 system timetable, the airline was operating scheduled passenger service to only five destinations, all located in the province of Alberta, and was known as Time Airways:

- Calgary, Alberta (YYC)
- Edmonton, Alberta - served via Edmonton Industrial Airport (YXD)
- Lethbridge, Alberta (YQL)
- Medicine Hat, Alberta (YXH)
- Red Deer, Alberta (YQF)

By early 1976, Time Air had expanded service to sixth destination in Alberta, being Grande Prairie (YQU), while continuing to serve the other five destinations listed above and its fleet was composed of two turboprop aircraft types at this time: the Fokker F27 Friendship and the STOL capable de Havilland Canada DHC-6 Twin Otter. By late 1978, a seventh destination in Alberta had been added, being Pincher Creek (WPL) with the airline operating Short 330 turboprops in addition to the DHC-6 Twin Otters at this time. The airline was also serving close-in Edmonton Industrial Airport (YXD, which was later renamed Edmonton City Centre Airport and is now closed) instead of Edmonton International Airport (YEG) and was competing with Pacific Western Airlines jet service operated with Boeing 737-200s on the Calgary-Edmonton Industrial Airport route. Time Air continued to compete on this route and by the spring of 1981 was operating the STOL capable de Havilland Canada DHC-7 Dash 7 on all of its flights between Calgary and Edmonton.

== Destinations in 1988 ==
According to the October 30, 1988 Time Air system route map, the airline was operating scheduled passenger service to the following destinations in Canada and the United States:

- Calgary, Alberta - Hub
- Campbell River, British Columbia
- Castlegar, British Columbia
- Cold Lake, Alberta
- Comox, British Columbia
- Dawson Creek, British Columbia
- Edmonton, Alberta - Hub
- Fort Chipewyan, Alberta
- Fort McMurray, Alberta
- Fort Nelson, British Columbia
- Fort St. John, British Columbia
- Grande Prairie, Alberta
- High Level, Alberta
- Kamloops, British Columbia
- Kelowna, British Columbia
- La Ronge, Saskatchewan
- Lethbridge, Alberta
- Lloydminster, Alberta
- Medicine Hat, Alberta
- Minneapolis/St. Paul, Minnesota
- Nanaimo, British Columbia
- Peace River, Alberta
- Penticton, British Columbia
- Port Hardy, British Columbia
- Prince Albert, Saskatchewan
- Quesnel, British Columbia
- Rainbow Lake, Alberta
- Regina, Saskatchewan
- Saskatoon, Saskatchewan - Focus city
- Seattle, Washington
- Stony Rapids, Saskatchewan
- Uranium City, Saskatchewan
- Vancouver, British Columbia - Hub
- Victoria, British Columbia
- Watson Lake, Yukon
- Williams Lake, British Columbia
- Winnipeg, Manitoba
- Wollaston Lake, Saskatchewan

Time Air was operating two international routes to the U.S. at this time: Vancouver-Seattle and Regina-Minneapolis/St. Paul. Service to Seattle was operated with de Havilland Canada DHC-7 Dash 7 and DHC-8 Dash 8 propjet aircraft with multiple flights a day while service to Minneapolis/St. Paul was flown daily with a Fokker F28 twin jet. The only other international route flown by Time Air was nonstop service between Lethbridge and Great Falls, Montana which was operated earlier in 1988; however, by October 1988, the airline had ceased all service on this route.

== Fleet ==
- Convair CV-580
- Convair CV-640
- de Havilland Canada DHC-6 Twin Otter
- de Havilland Canada DHC-7 Dash 7
- de Havilland Canada DHC-8 Dash 8
- Fairchild Swearingen Metroliner
- Fairchild F-27
- Fokker F28 Fellowship - Only jet aircraft type ever operated by Time Air. Operated as well by Norcanair.
- Short 330
- Short 360

== See also ==
- List of defunct airlines of Canada
