= Norcanair =

Canadian airline

- Last Norcanair logo
IATA	ICAO	Call sign
-	-	-
- Commenced operations: 1947
- Ceased operations: 2005
- Fleet size: See historical fleet below
- Destinations: Destinations in 1986 below
- Headquarters: Saskatoon, Saskatchewan, Canada

Norcanair was the name of a Canadian airline that existed from 1947 to 1987, and again briefly in the early 1990s and from 2001 to 2005.

== History ==
Norcanair traces its history back to M&C Aviation, founded in Saskatoon, Saskatchewan, in 1930 by private pilots Richmond Mayson and Angus Campbell. Moving soon to Prince Albert, this bush-flying firm survived the Great Depression by concentrating on carrying prospectors and travelers into Saskatchewan's heavily forested north. When the Second World War broke out, the firm's technical expertise was put to work running an overhaul facility in Prince Albert that maintained aircraft used by the British Commonwealth Air Training Plan.

=== M&C Aviation ===
Richmond "Dick" Mayson owned an aircraft in the late 1920s, a Stinson CF-AFF, when he met airframe engineer Angus Campbell, taught him to fly, and they became partners. Their first commercial activity was barnstorming, flying in to agricultural fairs ins Saskatchewan and taking people for airplane rides for "a penny a pound". Their small aircraft could take 3 passengers in addition to the pilot. Fairs were seasonal, usually late August through mid-October, and to keep the business growing they began flying fresh fish from Lac la Ronge and Big River. They incorporated the business as Mayson and Campbell Aviation in 1930, also known as M&C, which was originally based in Saskatoon.

In 1935, they moved to Prince Albert, and set up offices in a building in the downtown area by the river, where they built a dock and installed a fueling station for the float aircraft. They also obtained a hangar at the airport across the river. Dick Mayson was the primary businessman, while Angus Campbell was the primary pilot. They built their bush pilot service to include up to seven aircraft, flying hunters, fishermen, prospectors, miners and surveyors, and were credited with opening up Saskatchewan's north. Mayson had a lake and Campbell an island named after them.

Angus Campbell died in May 1943. Postwar, Dick Mayson accepted a 1947 offer from the province's new Cooperative Commonwealth Federation (CCF) government for the sale of the airline. The government's goal was to use aircraft to open the province's vast north. This airline was known as Saskatchewan Government Airways (SGA).

Structured as a Crown corporation, SGA operated from 1947 to 1965 from a main base at the Prince Albert (Glass Field) Airport and a number of sub-bases in northern Saskatchewan.

=== Norcanair ===
Saskatchewan's 1964 general election saw the NDP government defeated by the Liberals. SGA was privatized into the hands of some Saskatchewan businessmen, who renamed it North Canada Air or Norcanair for short. The firm operated two sets of services for the next 16 years: charter flights in northern Saskatchewan, and a modest series of scheduled routes running north–south in Saskatchewan. Its major equipment included Cessna 180s, Beavers and Otters. One of its Beavers, aircraft CF-FHB, is preserved in the Canada Aviation Museum in Ottawa, while one of its Model 170 Bristol Freighters, Freighter CF-WAE, is in the Western Canada Aviation Museum in Winnipeg, Manitoba.

For its scheduled routes, it operated five U.S.-built Fairchild F-27 turboprop aircraft acquired from Hughes Air West in 1976-77. Also flown was a wide array of other turboprop aircraft types including the Beechcraft King Air, Convair 640, de Havilland Canada DHC-6 Twin Otter, Embraer EMB-110 Bandeirante, and NAMC YS-11. The only jet airliner type operated by Norcanair was the Fokker F28 Fellowship although Norcanair was operating a Cessna Citation I business jet in 1983.

In 1981, Norcanair president John B. "Jack" Lloyd announced he was selling the airline back to the provincial government, which by this point was in the hands of the social democratic New Democratic Party. A tentative deal was struck, but before it could be finalized, the NDP government fell and its replacement, the Progressive Conservative party, resold the firm to Saskatoon businessman Albert Ethier, who combined the airline with his own charter firm, Hi-Line Airways.

During 1985, a scheduled nonstop passenger route to Minneapolis/St. Paul from Regina was initiated with the Fokker F28 Fellowship jet aircraft. By 1987, Norcanair was feeding passengers to CP Air and in March of the same year Norcanair was taken over by Time Air.

== Destinations ==
According to the October 26, 1986 Norcanair route system map, the airline was operating scheduled passenger service to the following destinations.

=== Canada ===
- Alberta
  - Calgary
  - Edmonton
  - Lloydminster
- Saskatchewan
  - La Ronge
  - Prince Albert
  - Regina
  - Saskatoon
  - Stony Rapids
  - Uranium City
  - Wollaston Lake

Manitoba Winnipeg

=== United States ===
- Minnesota
  - Minneapolis / St. Paul

Following the acquisition of Norcanair by Time Air in 1987, scheduled passenger service to all of the above destinations continued to be provided by Time Air.

== Fleet ==
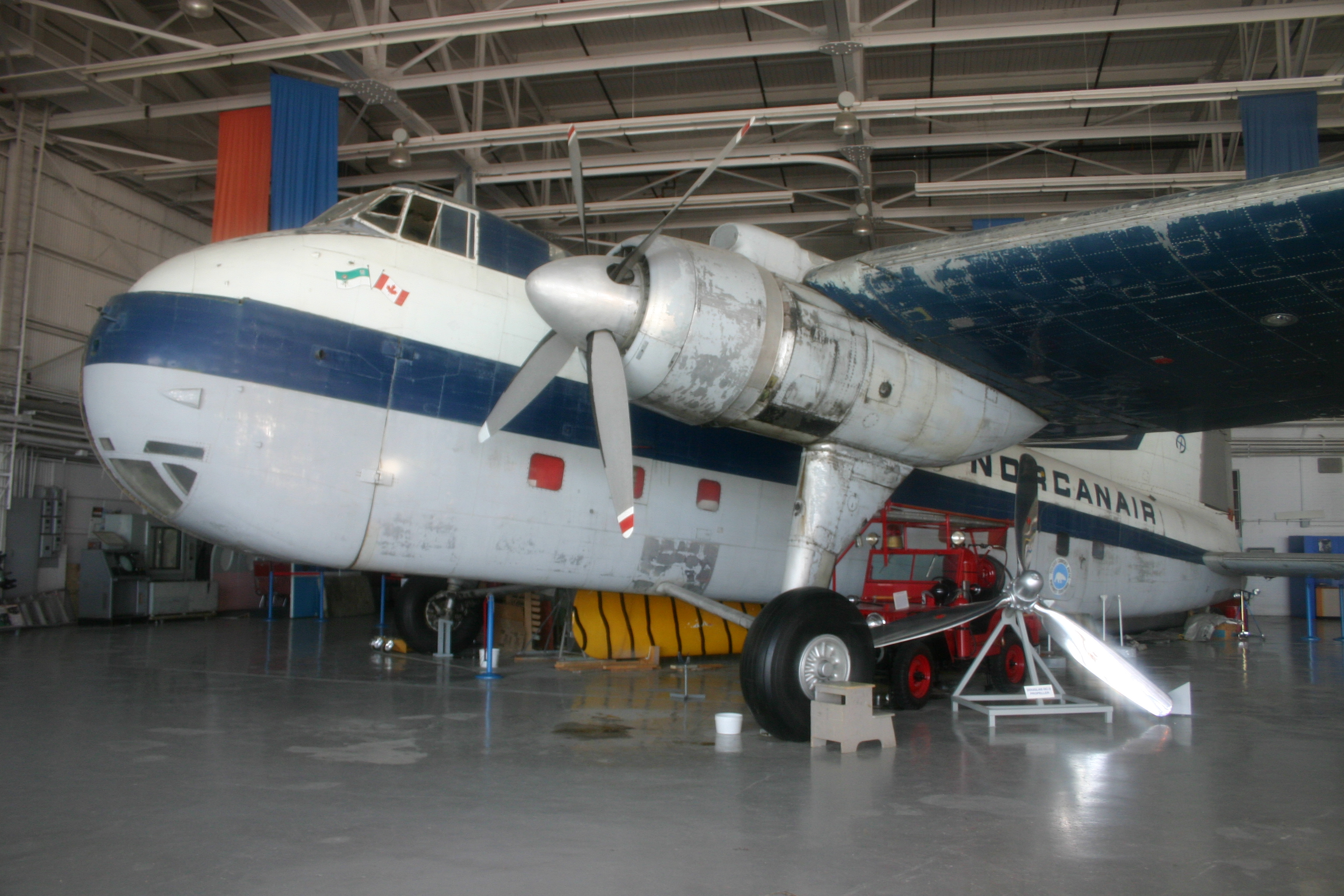
Bristol Freighter 31M in Norcanair markings at the Western Canada Aviation Museum in Winnipeg, Manitoba. 2007

- Beechcraft Model 18
- Beechcraft King Air
- BPY-5A Canso (version of the PBY Catalina amphibious aircraft)
- Bristol Freighter (Type 170)
- Cessna 180
- Cessna Citation I - business jet
- Convair 640
- de Havilland Canada DHC-2 Beaver
- de Havilland Canada DHC-3 Otter
- de Havilland Canada DHC-6 Twin Otter
- Douglas DC-3
- Embraer EMB-110 Bandeirante
- Fairchild F-27
- Fokker F28 Fellowship - only jet airliner type operated by Norcanair
- NAMC YS-11

== See also ==
- List of defunct airlines of Canada
