= Lethbridge Airport =

- IATA: YQL; ICAO: CYQL; WMO: 71267

Summary
- Airport type: Public
- Owner/Operator: City of Lethbridge
- Serves: Lethbridge
- Location: Lethbridge County, near Lethbridge, Alberta
- Opened: June 1939; 87 years ago
- Time zone: Alberta Time (UTC−06:00)
- Elevation AMSL: 3,049 ft (929 m)
- Coordinates: 49°37′49″N 112°47′59″W
- Website: www.lethbridgeairport.ca

Map
- Location in Alberta, Canada YQL / CYQL (Canada)

Runways
Direction	Length		Surface
Direction	ft	m	Surface
06/24	6,500	1,981	Asphalt
13/31	5,500	1,676	Asphalt

Statistics (2019)
- Passenger movements: 104,078
- Sources: Canada Flight Supplement; Environment Canada; Movements from Modalis

Lethbridge Airport (IATA: YQL, ICAO: CYQL), previously Lethbridge County Airport, is located 4 nautical miles (7.4 km; 4.6 mi) south-southeast of Lethbridge, Alberta, Canada. It is 10–15 driving minutes from downtown Lethbridge. The airport is classified as an airport of entry by Nav Canada and is staffed by the Canada Border Services Agency (CBSA) on a call-out basis from the Sweetgrass-Coutts Border Crossing. CBSA officers at this airport can handle general aviation aircraft only, with no more than 15 passengers. The airport was the site of the biennial Lethbridge International Airshow until 2023.

In February 2026, WestJet announced it would be ending its WestJet Encore service between Lethbridge and Calgary, removing the only flight service into Lethbridge Airport by June.

== History ==
Originally known as Kenyon Field, this aerodrome began passenger services in October 1938, but officially opened in June 1939. Prior to this, the city operated aviation activities in areas now occupied by Exhibition Park and Lethbridge Collegiate Institute.

From 1939 to 1948, Lethbridge operated as western Canada's primary airline hub. According to the Trans-Canada Air Lines (TCA) system timetable dated January 1, 1940, Lethbridge was a stop on Trans-Canada's transcontinental flights linking Montreal, Ottawa, Winnipeg, Regina and Vancouver with connecting service to and from Toronto via North Bay (which was one of the stops on the TCA transcontinental flights between Montreal and Vancouver) operated with Lockheed piston engine twin prop aircraft. This same timetable also lists connecting TCA service between Lethbridge and Calgary and Edmonton. U.S. air carrier Western Air Lines served Lethbridge at this time as well with flights to Salt Lake City with connecting service to Las Vegas and Los Angeles. Western operated Boeing 247D twin prop aircraft with a routing of Lethbridge-Cut Bank-Great Falls-Helena-Butte-Idaho Falls-Pocatello-Salt Lake City. According to the route map in the above referenced timetable, Lethbridge was the only international destination served by Western at this time.

=== RCAF and D of T Aerodrome Lethbridge c.1942 ===
Around 1942, the aerodrome was listed at 49°38′N 112°48′W with a Var. 22 degrees E and elevation of 3,020 feet (920 m). Four runways were listed, as follows:

Orientation	Length	Width	Surface
3/21	3,500 feet (1,067 m)	150 feet (46 m)	Hard surfaced
12/30	3,600 feet (1,097 m)	150 feet (46 m)	Hard surfaced
7/25	3,500 feet (1,067 m)	150 feet (46 m)	Hard surfaced
16/34	3,000 feet (914 m)	—	Turf

=== RCAF Station Lethbridge ===
At the outbreak of World War II, Kenyon Field became a training facility under the British Commonwealth Air Training Plan (BCATP). The station was operated and administered by the Royal Canadian Air Force (RCAF) and called RCAF Station Lethbridge. Beginning in July 1940, the aerodrome hosted No. 5 Elementary Flying Training School (EFTS). Instruction was provided by members of the local flying club. Since the airport often experienced significant wind, the flying school moved to less windy High River in June 1941.

Late in 1941, the No. 8 Bombing and Gunnery School, also a BCATP training facility, opened at the station. Since land was required for gunnery and bombing practice, about 100 sq mi (260 km^{2}) was leased from the Blood Indian Reserve located nearby. Aircraft used by this school included Fairey Battles, Lysanders, Ansons, and Bolingbrokes.

No. 133 (Fighter) Squadron was formed here in June 1942, flying Hurricanes and Harvards. The squadron moved to Boundary Bay Airport, British Columbia in October 1942. The RCAF left Lethbridge in 1944.

=== Post-war ===
In 1947, the RCAF's mess hall was converted by the Department of Transportation (now Transport Canada) into an air terminal building, which was replaced by the current facility in 1979.

By 1962, passenger flights operated by Trans-Canada Air Lines had become more regional in nature. According to Trans-Canada's system timetable dated April 29, 1962, the airline was operating Vickers Viscount turboprop service on a routing of Lethbridge-Calgary-Edmonton and was also flying Douglas DC-3 service with a routing of Lethbridge-Medicine Hat-Swift Current-Regina-Yorkton-Brandon-Winnipeg. Trans Canada would become Air Canada which in turn continued to operate Vickers Viscount turboprop service on the Lethbridge-Calgary-Edmonton route before ceasing all scheduled passenger service to Lethbridge during the early 1970s.

Time Air was a regional airline that initiated operations in Lethbridge. Founded in 1966 as Lethbridge Air Service, Time Air flew a variety of turboprop aircraft and also operated jet service as well with Fokker F28 Fellowship twin jets. In February 1976, the Official Airline Guide (OAG) listed up to eight round trip flights a day operated by Time Air nonstop between Lethbridge and Calgary with Fokker F27 Friendship and de Havilland Twin Otter turboprops. According to the November 15, 1979 edition of the OAG, Time Air was operating up to ten flights a day nonstop to Calgary with DHC-6 Twin Otter and Short 330 turboprop aircraft. By April 1985, the airline was operating larger Dash 7 turboprops on the Lethbridge-Calgary route in addition to the Short 330 aircraft with up to nine flights a day. In 1995, Time Air was flying the Fokker F28 twin jet on a daily basis between Calgary and Lethbridge in addition to other flights operated on the route with Dash 8 turboprops. This appears to have been one of the few times that Lethbridge had scheduled passenger jet service. Time Air was also flying at this time as a Canadian Partner air carrier as part of a code sharing agreement with Canadian Airlines International (formerly CP Air). There was also competition on the Lethbridge-Calgary route at this time as Air BC was operating Dash 8 turboprops as an Air Canada Connector air carrier via a code sharing agreement with Air Canada. Air BC also operated the British Aerospace BAe Jetstream 31 between Lethbridge and Calgary at one point. Time Air operated other flights as well from Lethbridge including direct service to Vancouver via an intermediate stop in either Kelowna or Penticton, British Columbia during the 1980s and also nonstop service in 1988 to Great Falls, Montana. In 1993, Time Air and Ontario Express began operating as Canadian Regional Airlines on behalf of Canadian Airlines International which then eventually acquired Time Air and merged the airline with Ontario Express. By 1999, Time Air was operating Dash 8 turboprops as well as Fairchild Swearingen Metroliner on its flights to Calgary as Canadian Regional while Alberta Citylink was flying BAe Jetstream 31 turboprops on its services to Calgary as Air Canada Connector.

Lethbridge County assumed ownership of the airport on January 1, 1997, and it was renamed Lethbridge County Airport.

On July 26, 2009, the Evergreen Supertanker successfully landed and took off from runway 05 as part of the 2009 airshow, marking the first time a Boeing 747 has used the airport. On August 1, 2013, the County of Lethbridge approved renaming the airport to Lethbridge Airport.

On March 16, 2018, Lethbridge County along with the City of Lethbridge agreed to transfer the airport to the city, which was finalized on July 1, 2018.

Air Canada ended its service from Calgary to Lethbridge on April 1, 2020 due to the COVID-19 pandemic.

On February 24, 2026, WestJet announced in an email that it would be ending its service between Calgary and Lethbridge, citing that "demand for the services has been insufficient." The final flight between the two cities took place on June 24, 2026.

== Services ==
The airport is a Canadian Air Transport Security Authority (CATSA) Designated Aerodrome, thus providing full passenger screening. It also serves as a regional airport, offering a number of on-site charter, maintenance, flight training and specialty aviation services. There are roughly 40 aircraft based at the airport, including commercial, corporate, recreational, flight training, aerial spray and rotary-wing.

Between 50 and 60 percent of typical annual aircraft movements are flight training and scheduled air carrier services. In 2003, aircraft movements for the year were roughly 30,000 and passenger movements were roughly 55,000.

Aircraft services are available through Airwest Flight Support (Executive Flight Center) and Southern Aero Aviation (World Fuel Service). Both offer Avgas 100LL, Jet A1 FSII, GPU, de-icing, a pilot lounge, hangarage, and tie downs. Airwest also provides inspections, repairs, and aircraft sales, and Southern Aero also provides courtesy vehicles, and sleeping quarters. Respectively, frequencies are 130.75 and 123.4, and they are found at aprons 2 and 3.

== Incidents ==
On February 7, 2009, a general aviation Cessna 150 crash-landed in a field at the airport. The pilot was landing when a gust of wind apparently overtook the aircraft. The pilot escaped uninjured, however the plane sustained major damage. The crash was investigated by Transport Canada and the Transportation Safety Board.

On July 23, 2010, a Royal Canadian Air Force McDonnell Douglas CF-18 Hornet crashed during a practice run for the upcoming Alberta International Airshow. The pilot ejected from the aircraft less than two seconds before it struck the ground nose first, exploding into a fireball. Captain Brian Bews survived with three compressed vertebrae.

== See also ==
- List of airports in the Lethbridge area
