= Southern Frontier Airlines =

Canadian commuter airline

IATA	ICAO	Call sign
-	SFS	SOUTHERN FRONTIER
- Founded: 1978
- Ceased operations: 1988
- Operating bases: Calgary International Airport

Southern Frontier Airlines was a commuter airline based in Canada which was acquired by Time Air on April 25, 1988.

In 1985, Southern Frontier was operating Beechcraft 99 turboprop aircraft from its base in Calgary to Lloydminster, Saskatchewan. The airline also operated service between Edmonton, Alberta and both Cold Lake, AB and Lloydminster and was formerly known as Southern Frontier Air Transport.

== See also ==
- List of defunct airlines of Canada
