= Medicine Hat Airport =

Canadian airport

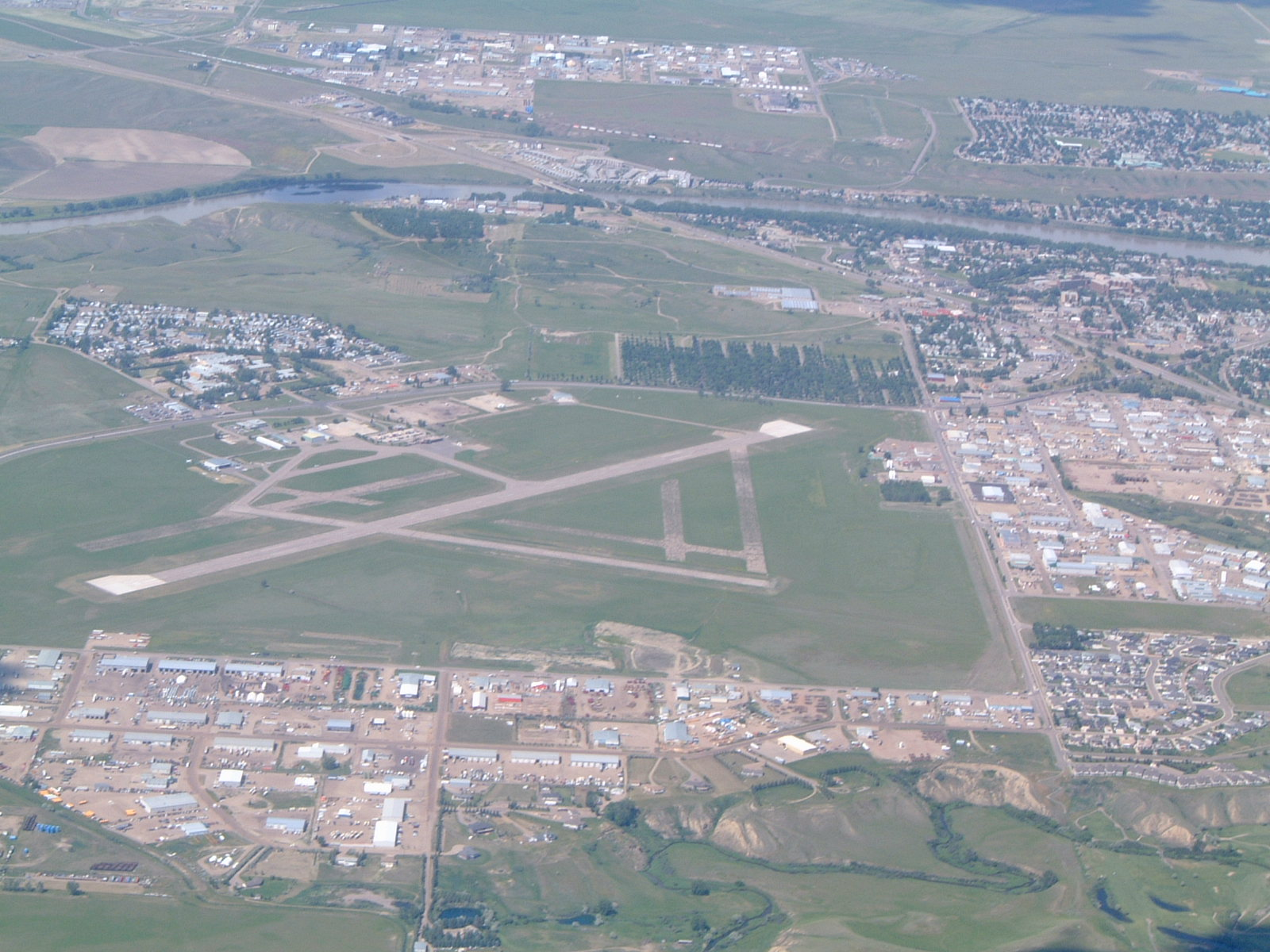
- Medicine Hat Airport
- IATA: YXH; ICAO: CYXH; WMO: 71872

Summary
- Airport type: Public
- Operator: Municipality of Medicine Hat
- Location: Medicine Hat, Alberta
- Time zone: Alberta Time (UTC−06:00)
- Elevation AMSL: 2,351 ft (717 m)
- Coordinates: 50°01′08″N 110°43′14″W
- Website: https://www.medicinehat.ca/en/roads-parking-and-transportation/airport.aspx

Map
- Location in Alberta

Runways
Direction	Length		Surface
Direction	ft	m	Surface
03/21	5,003	1,525	Asphalt
09/27	2,850	869	Asphalt

Statistics (2012)
- Aircraft movements: 21,485
- Sources: Canada Flight Supplement; Environment Canada; Movements from Statistics Canada

Medicine Hat Airport (IATA: YXH, ICAO: CYXH) is located 2 nautical miles (3.7 km; 2.3 mi) southwest of Medicine Hat, Alberta, Canada.

During World War II the site was used as part of the British Commonwealth Air Training Plan (BCATP).

== Airlines and destinations ==
On February 24, 2026, WestJet announced in an email that it would be ending its service between Calgary and Medicine Hat, citing that "demand for the services has been insufficient." The final flight between the two cities flew on June 24, 2026.

== History ==
=== Aerodrome ===
In approximately 1942 the aerodrome was listed at 50°02′N 110°43′W with a Var. 21 degrees E and elevation of 2,345 feet (715 m). Six runways were listed as follows:

Runway name	Length	Width	Surface
2R/20L	2,950 feet (899 m)	100 feet (30 m)	Hard surfaced
2L/20R	2,950 feet (899 m)	100 feet (30 m)	Hard surfaced
16R/34L	2,700 feet (823 m)	100 feet (30 m)	Hard surfaced
16L/34R	2,700 feet (823 m)	100 feet (30 m)	Hard surfaced
9R/27L	2,850 feet (869 m)	100 feet (30 m)	Hard surfaced
9L/27R	2,750 feet (838 m)	100 feet (30 m)	Hard surfaced

=== Relief landing field - Holsom ===
In approximately 1942 the aerodrome was listed at 50°02′00″N 110°52′00″W with a Var. 22 degrees E and elevation of 2,540 feet (774 m). Three runways were listed as follows:

Runway name	Length	Width	Surface
13/31	2,800 feet (853 m)	100 feet (30 m)	Hard surfaced
6/24	2,800 feet (853 m)	100 feet (30 m)	Hard surfaced
2/20	2,800 feet (853 m)	100 feet (30 m)	Hard surfaced

=== Second World War training ===
RCAF Station Medicine Hat was home to No. 34 Service Flying Training School (SFTS) of the Royal Air Force, which became part of the British Commonwealth Air Training Plan. The SFTS was open from 8 April 1941 to 17 November 1944. In 1939, the Department of National Defence appropriated the Medicine Hat Exhibition and Stampede Grounds, which was also used as a prisoner of war camp.

== See also ==
- Medicine Hat/Schlenker Airport
