= B/E Aerospace =

Manufacturer of aircraft passenger cabin interior products

B/E Aerospace, Inc.
- Traded as: Nasdaq: BEAV
- Founded: 1987 as Bach Engineering
- Fate: Acquired
- Headquarters: Wellington, Florida, USA
- Area served: Global
- Key people: Amin Khoury, founder and Chairman
- Products: Commercial & Business Jet Cabin Interior Products
- Revenue: ▲US$2.933 billion (2016)
- Operating income: ▲US$506.6 million (2016)
- Net income: ▲US$311.1 million (2016)
- Total assets: ▲US$4.41 billion (2016)
- Total equity: ▲US$1.875B (FY 2011)
- Owner: Rockwell Collins Inc.
- Number of employees: 10,057
- Divisions: Commercial Aircraft; Business Jets
- Website: http://beaerospace.com

B/E Aerospace, Inc. was a manufacturer of aircraft passenger cabin interior products for the commercial and business jet aircraft markets. B/E Aerospace had leading worldwide market shares in all of its major product lines and served virtually all of the world's airlines, aircraft manufacturers and leasing companies through its direct global sales and customer support organizations. Based in Wellington, Florida, the company was capitalized as a $4.2 billion corporation as of January 2016.

In December 2014, B/E announced that it had completed the spin-off of its aerospace fasteners and consumables business, creating KLX, Inc. (Nasdaq: KLXI). In December 2017, KLX split "Energy Services Group", which now functions as KLX Energy with original KLX Aerospace business acquired by Boeing.

In April 2017, it was purchased by Rockwell Collins, which has since become a part of Collins Aerospace, a business of United Technologies Corporation (UTC), November 2018. In April 2020, UTC and Raytheon merged to form Raytheon Technologies (RTX).

== History ==
Founded by Amin Khoury in 1987, B/E Aerospace evolved from a $3 million company to a firm with $2.6 billion in revenue, manufacturing aircraft interior products and solutions for the commercial, business jet, and military markets. According to a company history, B/E's growth occurred through a combination of numerous acquisitions and internal growth.

In August 2001, B/E acquired M&M Aerospace Hardware Inc., a distributor of aerospace fasteners, for $177 million in cash and stock.

On June 1, 2005, Air Canada awarded a $50 million (U.S.) contract to B/E Aerospace to upgrade seating in 143 aircraft.

In June 2008, B/E announced plans to acquire Honeywell International's Consumables Solutions distribution business. The acquisition was completed on July 28, 2008 for $901 million in cash and stock. B/E stated at the time: "The combined businesses are expected to generate more than 50 percent of B/E's operating earnings beginning in 2009."

In 2012, B/E's ALCI division became the sole source for all future lavatories on new build Boeing 737 aircraft. Introducing their patented Spacewall lavatory, airlines can take advantage of space provided to add up to 6 passenger seats per aircraft. Delta Air Lines was the launch customer, with the first aircraft delivery on 9/27/2013.

== Products ==
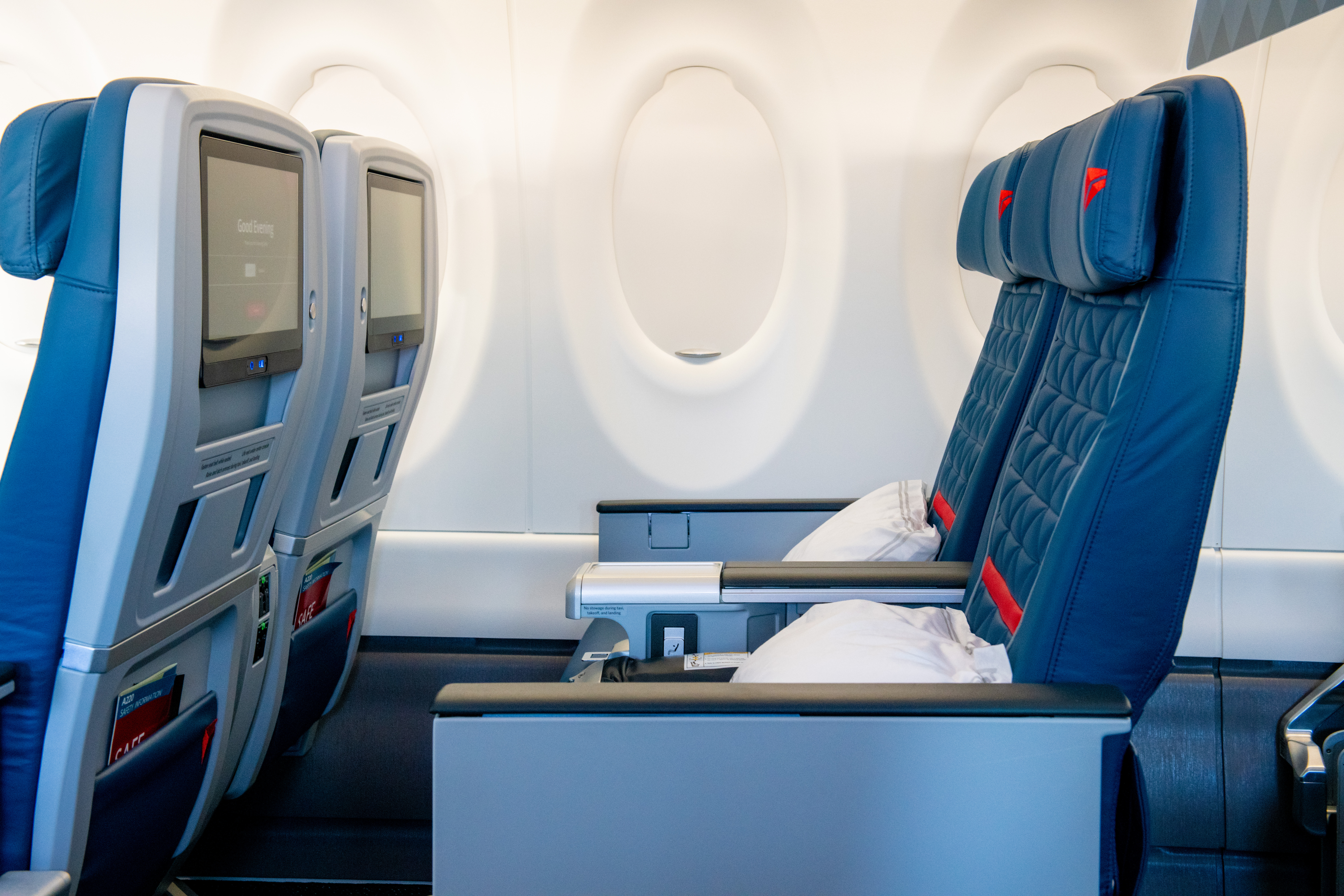
B/E Aerospace MIQ business class seats

The company was a major provider of airline seats to many airlines worldwide. Some significant customers included United Airlines, Delta Air Lines, Emirates, Qatar Airways, Air France, KLM, Lufthansa, Qantas, Japan Airlines, and Southwest Airlines. Customers using the company's most popular product - Diamond Business Class Seat, include Aeroflot, Aeromexico, Air Canada, Air China, American Airlines, China Airlines, China Southern Airlines, Delta Air Lines, KLM, Qatar Airways, Thai Airways, United Airlines, Virgin Australia and Xiamen Airlines. Some of B/E Aerospace's rivals in the airline seating industry include Acro Aircraft Seating in the UK, Zodiac Seats U.S. in Gainesville, Texas, Zodiac Seats France, STELIA Aerospace in France, Geven in Italy, Recaro in Germany, Expliseat in France and Aviointeriors in Italy.

In the business jet seating segment, B/E Aerospace's main competitors were United Technologies Corporation's Decrane Aircraft Seating in Peshtigo, Wisconsin, Iacobucci in Italy, and PAC Seating Systems in Palm City, Florida.

B/E Aerospace also manufactured beverage makers, ovens, oxygen systems, lavatories and interior lighting for commercial aircraft and business jets. B/E Aerospace's Interior Structures division based in Leighton Buzzard UK, manufactures and supplies galley monuments for the Airbus A350.

== Oxygen Systems ==
The FAA announced on 11 August 2008 that it would investigate why "almost half the masks either did not deploy or failed to provide oxygen" during a pan-pan event on American Airlines Flight 31 The FAA had recently issued airworthiness directives regarding problems with defective inline flow indicators obstructing the BE Aerospace oxygen masks on several Boeing commercial aircraft models. B/E had identified a repair in February 2006. Boeing then issued a "Special Attention Service Bulletin" to inspect and if necessary repair the masks in April 2007. The directives only require action by April 2013 unless already done.

== Acquisition by Rockwell Collins ==
In April 2017, B/E Aerospace was acquired by the avionics and aircraft connectivity provider Rockwell Collins for $6.4 billion. Based in Cedar Rapids, Iowa, Rockwell Collins competes with Honeywell and more recently with Garmin. Through this transaction, B/E shareholders would own 20% of the new Rockwell, which would have $8.1 billion in revenues and $1.9 billion in pre-tax earnings with nearly 30,000 employees. As a result of the acquisition, a newly created direct or indirect subsidiary of Rockwell Collins, Quarterback Merger Sub Corp., merged with and into B/E Aerospace, with the latter surviving the merger as a direct or indirect subsidiary of Rockwell Collins.

Rockwell Collins filed for regulatory approval for the acquisition of B/E Aerospace before the Philippine Competition Commission since the latter has a branch in the Philippines operating a manufacturing plant in Tanauan, Batangas.
