= Zoey Williams =

Canadian pilot

- Born: Southern Ontario, Canada
- Education: Embry–Riddle Aeronautical University (BS, MBA)
- Occupation: Commercial pilot

Zoey Williams is a Canadian commercial aviation pilot from Southern Ontario, Canada. She is noted for being the first Black female pilot to fly a Boeing 777 for Air Canada.

== Early life and education ==
Williams was born in Southern Ontario. Her father worked as a pilot for Air Canada, and would frequently take his family along on flights in lieu of childcare. Her father encouraged her to try flying, and took her on a introductory flight on a Cessna, but she ran into turbulence, leaving her scared and "vowing never to fly again". However, she later determined she wanted to overcome her fear, and earned her pilot's license at the age of 16.

Williams earned a Bachelor of Science in Aeronautics & Aviation Management from Embry–Riddle Aeronautical University followed by a Master of Business Administration in Aviation & International Business.

== Career ==
Williams earned her certification as a flight instructor at the age of 19. She started working for Wasaya Airways, flying a Beechcraft 1900 in the Northern Ontario region. Williams served as a first officer on a Embraer 175 aircraft for Sky Regional Airlines and has also flown a Boeing 737 for Flair Airlines.

After joining Air Canada as a first officer for the Boeing 777, she made her first flight as pilot in October 2023, marking the first time a Black female pilot flew the 777 for the airline. Black Enterprise notes that Black pilots only compose 3.4% of the industry in the United States, with Air Canada only employing 30 Black pilots as of 2024.

Williams is the Pilot-in-Residence for the University of Waterloo, the first to hold the position for the university.

== Personal life ==
Williams is a singer and a member of the Society of Composers, Authors and Music Publishers of Canada. She also sings with the Thunder Bay Symphony Orchestra, a professional orchestra located in Ontario.

== Awards and honors ==
- In 2016, Williams received the Aviation Pathway Award for Professionalism and Diversity from Jazz Aviation
- In 2023, Williams was included on Wings magazine's "Top 20 under 40" list
- In 2024, Williams was honored Northern Lights Rising Star award which honors Canadian women in aerospace
- In 2024, Williams was named one of the Top 25 Women of Influence in Canada
