= Iacobucci =

Iacobucci is a surname. Notable people with the surname include:

- Adam Iacobucci (born 1986), Australian footballer
- Alessandro Iacobucci (born 1991), Italian footballer
- Dawn Iacobucci (born c. 1960), American marketing professor
- Ed Iacobucci (1953–2013), Argentine businessman
- Edward Iacobucci, dean of the University of Toronto Faculty of Law, son of Frank
- Frank Iacobucci (born 1937), Canadian judge
