= Expliseat =

Expliseat SAS
- Company type: Private
- Industry: Airline Seat
- Founder: Benjamin Saada, Jean-Charles Samuelian, Vincent Tejedor
- Headquarters: Paris, France
- Key people: CEO: Benjamin Saada
- Website: https://expliseat.com/

Expliseat is an aircraft seat manufacturer based in Paris, known for its very light aircraft seats, the TiSeat or Titanium Seat.

== Development ==
Benjamin Saada, Jean-Charles Samuelian, and Vincent Tejedor created Expliseat in 2011. The company was registered as an approved design organization by EASA in 2013.

In March 2014, Expliseat has certified the first aircraft seat made of composite and titanium at just 4 kg that offers a 50-percent saving compared with the lightest models made by other manufacturers like Recaro, Safran or Rockwell Collins which weigh between 10 and 11 kilograms. The same year, Expliseat has secured its first customer with Air Méditerranée on their Airbus A320s, a French airline based in Toulouse.

In 2015, Expliseat enlarged its product range to regional aircraft. In 2016, ATR and Expliseat signed a buyer-furnished equipment (BFE) agreement for the supply of Expliseat's Titanium Seat with Air Tahiti acted as the launch customer. The lighter seat helps ATR operators to decrease fuel burn while allowing the carriage of more guests and cargo on board, it has been selected by multiple operators including major airlines like Cebu Pacific in the Philippines.

In 2017, during Paris Air Show, Dassault Aviation selected Expliseat to equip the seats of its Falcon Multi-role Aircraft. The reduced weight of the seats will allow its Falcon aircraft to improve the range by 370 km or 25 minutes.

In 2018, Expliseat has developed a new seat model, the TiSeat E2. While TiSeat E1 has attracted regional operators, Expliseat says that TiSeat E2 can satisfy the needs of medium-haul routes for legacy airlines, as well as the needs of low cost or regional carriers on short-haul segments. Seat was selected by SpiceJet on 10 Boeing 737 Next Gen and 25 new Bombardier Q400 aircraft in April 2018

In 2019, after Longview Aviation Capital Corp. agrees to Acquire Dash 8 Program from Bombardier Inc, De Havilland Canada announces Expliseat's Ultra-light Seats as an optional feature for the Dash 8-400 Aircraft. The same year, Expliseat has also begun the Airbus Supplier Qualification process for the TiSeat E2 targeting to become a linefit supplier on the single aisle market within the next two years.

In 2020, Canada's Nolinor Aviation has selected Expliseat's TiSeat E2 on its Boeing 737-400 fleet. Seats will be installed on Nolinor new Airline OWG. 40 per cent lighter than other certified seats, Prud’homme, the CEO of Nolinor, said the new seats will allow OWG aircraft to carry more payload than a 737-800

== Customers ==
Expliseat have sold 50 cabins in 2017, list of Customers includes:

List of customers by area
Area	Customers
Europe / Africa	Air Méditerranée, Fly CAA, ATR, Airbus, Dassault Aviation
Americas	United Express, Air North, Calm Air, La Costena, Nolinor Aviation, De Havilland
Asia / Pacific	SpiceJet, Cebu Pacific, Flyme, Air Calédonie, Air Tahiti

== Specification ==
Key technical data
Variant	TiSeat E1	TiSeat E2
Seat type:	Slim seat	Reclinable seat
Seat weight:	From 4 kg	From 5 kg
Certification	16g dynamic + HIC	16g dynamic + HIC
Aircraft models:	ATR, Falcon Jets	Boeing 737, Airbus A320, E-Jets, CRJ, Dash 8

== Awards ==
- JEC Innovation Award, 2014
- Titanium Application Development Award, 2014
- BFM "Grand Prix" Sustainable Business, 2014
- Prix Entrepreneuriat MINES ParisTech Criteo, 2015
- Observeur du Design, Etoile, 2015
- Montgolfier Price, 2015
- INPI, 2017
