= Jazz Aviation =

Regional airline of Canada

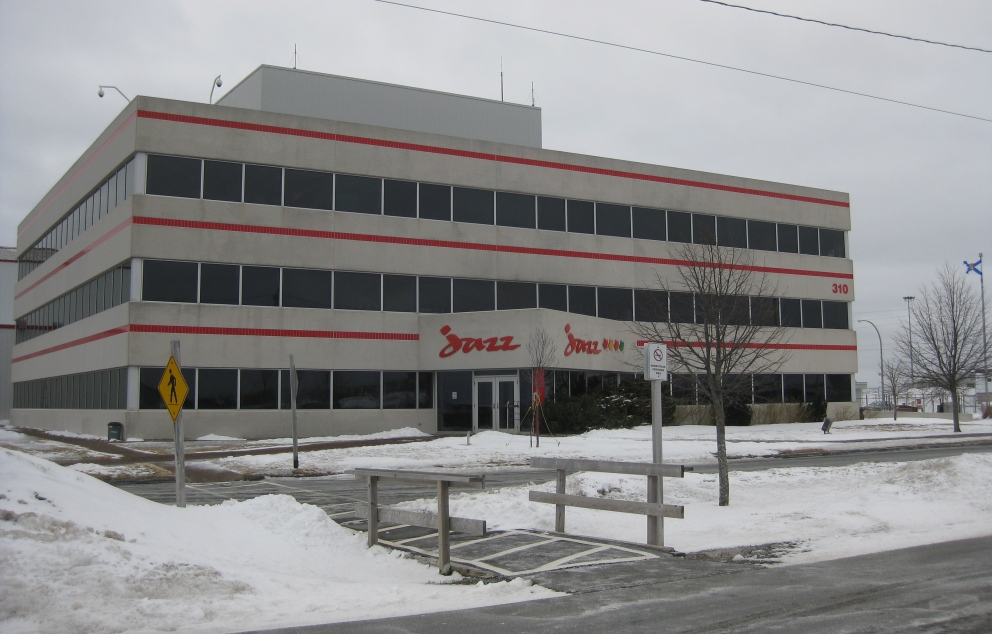
- Headquarters of Jazz in Enfield, Nova Scotia, 2011
IATA	ICAO	Call sign
QK	JZA	JAZZ
- Founded: 2001; 25 years ago (amalgamation; as Air Canada Regional)
- AOC #: Canada: 5002; United States: NZAF100F
- Operating bases: Calgary; Halifax; Montreal–Trudeau; Toronto–Pearson; Vancouver
- Frequent-flyer program: Aeroplan (Air Canada)
- Alliance: Star Alliance (affiliate)
- Fleet size: 86
- Destinations: 71
- Parent company: Chorus Aviation
- Headquarters: Halifax Stanfield International Airport, Enfield, Nova Scotia, Canada
- Key people: Doug Clarke (President)
- Employees: 4,500
- Website: www.flyjazz.ca

Jazz Aviation LP, commonly shortened to Jazz, is a Canadian regional airline based at Halifax Stanfield International Airport, in Enfield, Halifax, Nova Scotia, and is a wholly owned subsidiary of Chorus Aviation. Jazz Aviation provides regional and charter airline services in Canada and the United States, primarily under contract to Air Canada using the brand name Air Canada Express, and also as Jazz Charters.

It is Canada's third-largest airline in terms of fleet size but not in terms of passengers carried annually, number of employees, or destinations served. Its Air Canada Express operations serve around 70 destinations in Canada and the United States. Under a capacity purchase agreement, Air Canada sets the Jazz route network and flight schedule, and purchases all of Jazz's seat capacity based on predetermined rates. Its main base is Halifax Stanfield International Airport, with hubs at Toronto Pearson International Airport, Victoria International Airport, Vancouver International Airport, Montréal–Trudeau International Airport, and Calgary International Airport.

Prior to April 2011, Air Canada's regional operations were branded as Air Canada Jazz. Following the award of a contract to Sky Regional Airlines, the Air Canada Express brand was introduced as an umbrella for all regional operations. The Jazz brand is now entirely managed by Jazz Aviation LP.

== History ==
=== Corporate history ===
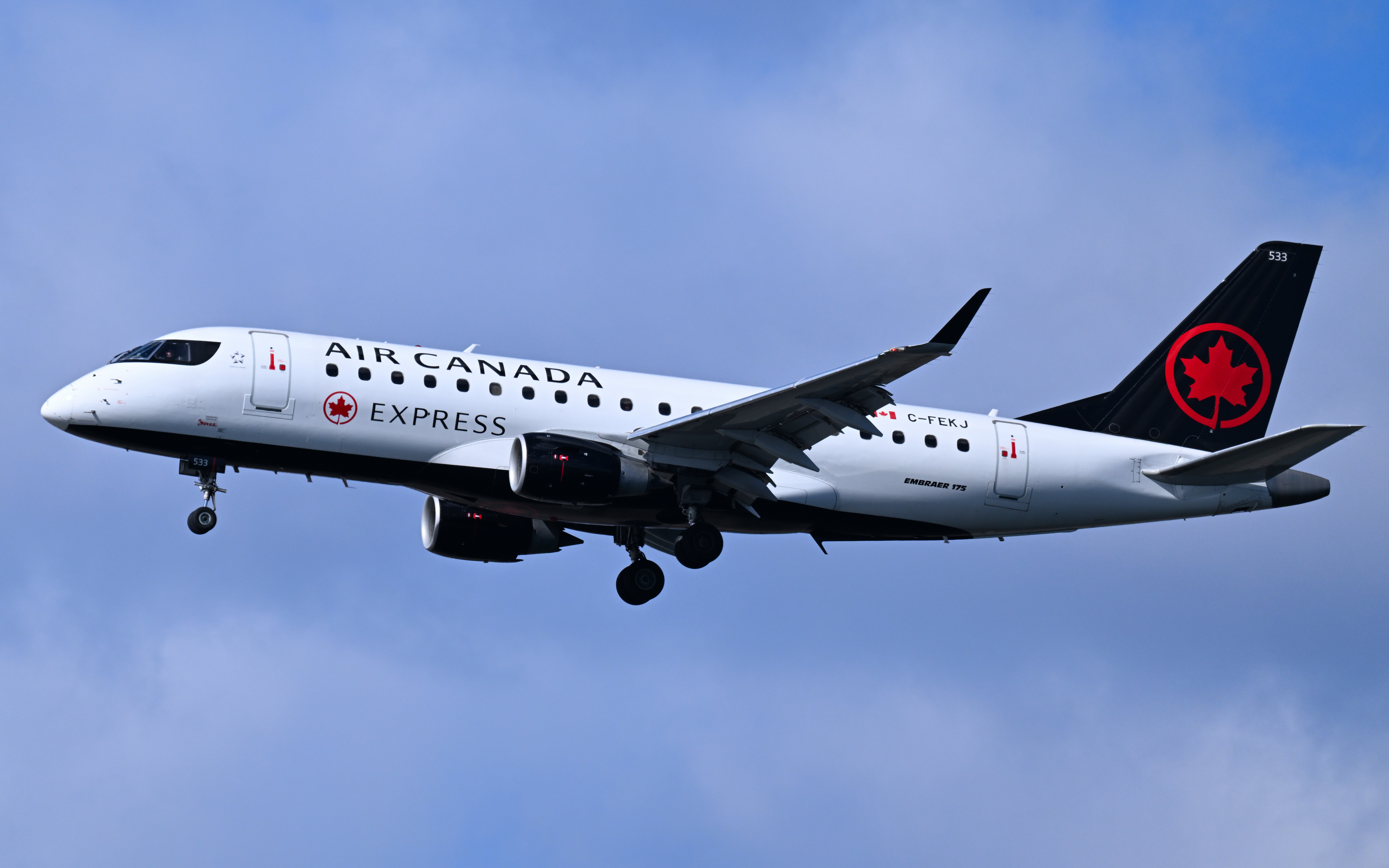
A Jazz Embraer E175, 2025

Air Canada Regional Inc. was established in 2001 from the consolidation of the Air Canada Connector carriers Air BC, Air Nova, Air Ontario, and Canadian Regional Airlines (shortly after the merger between Canadian Airlines and Air Canada). The merger was finalized in 2002 with the creation of a new brand: Air Canada Jazz.

In 2006, ACE Aviation Holdings, the owners of Air Canada, sold off all of its Air Canada Jazz assets. Air Canada Jazz was then an independent company known as Jazz Air Income Fund, which launched an initial public offering in February 2006; units of the income trust traded as JAZ.UN.

On November 15, 2010, the airline was restructured and changed its name to Chorus Aviation, became a public corporation, and traded as "CHR" at the Toronto Stock Exchange.

In 2011, Air Canada announced it would phase out the use of the "Air Canada Jazz" name and livery, and instead brand its regional operations as "Air Canada Express", with the subtitle "operated by Jazz".

=== Operational history ===
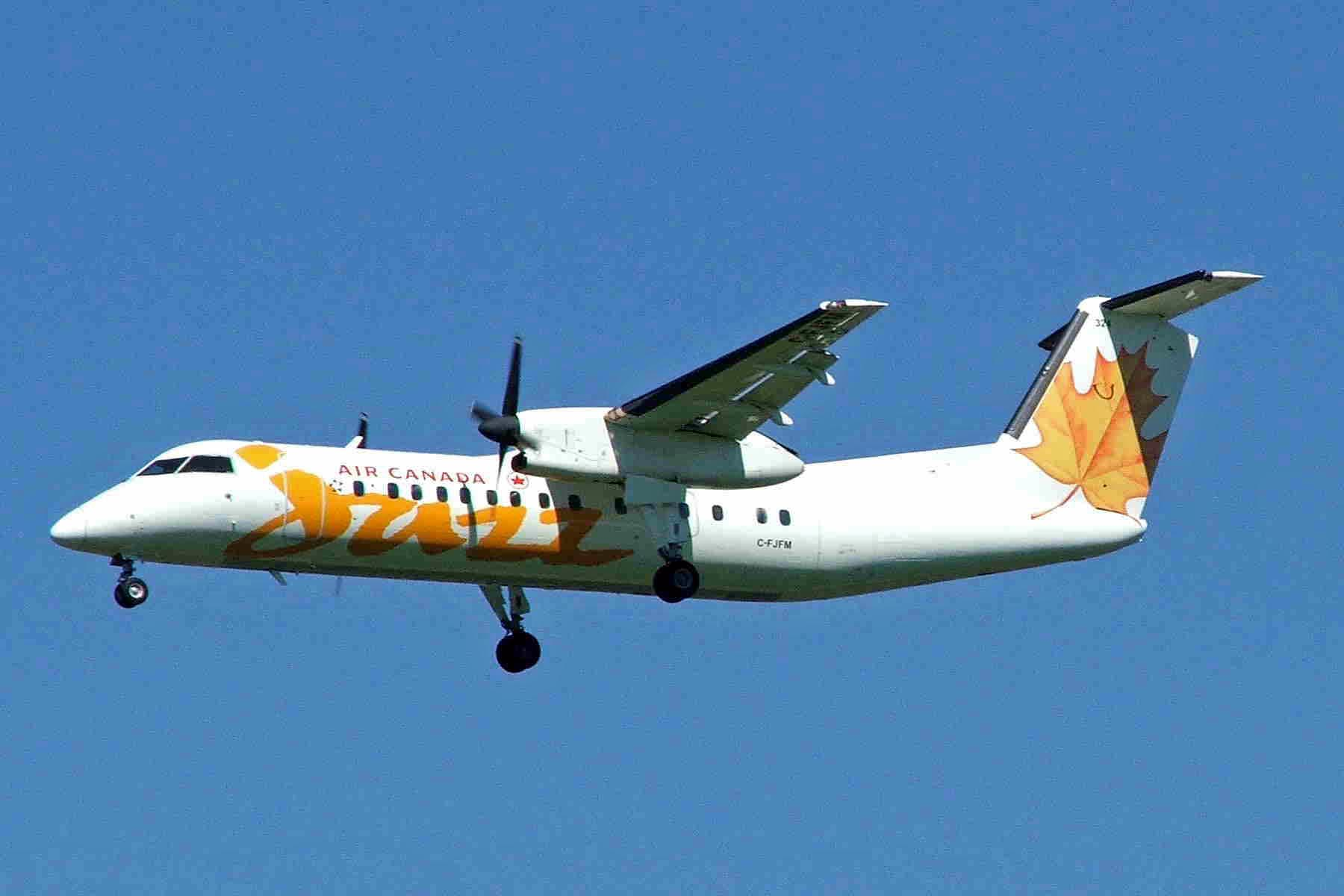
De Havilland Canada Dash 8, in yellow Jazz livery

In February 2006, Air Canada announced that City Centre Aviation Limited (CCAL) had served a 30-day termination notice for Jazz's month-to-month lease of terminal space at Toronto City Centre Airport. The Toronto Port Authority itself does not control any significant terminal space at the airport, but it extended permission for Jazz to continue using the airport; however, since the airline could not find terminal space, they cancelled service to the airport at the end of February 2006. CCAL had been bought by REGCO Holdings, (now Porter Aviation Holdings), the owners of Porter Airlines, which launched service from the airport later that year.

In August 2008, Jazz Aviation removed all life jackets from its aircraft to lower fuel costs. According to the airline, passengers are to use floating seat cushions in the event of an emergency over water. The airline also stated that the probability of a water landing on the regional airline routes was almost zero, as no operation over great bodies of water occurs except for the Great Lakes and the Gulf of St. Lawrence, and that in all circumstances, the airline always remains within 50 nautical miles (93 km; 58 mi) from land, as stipulated in the law, which removes the obligation from carrying any flotation devices.

== Other ventures ==
=== Thomas Cook Canada ===
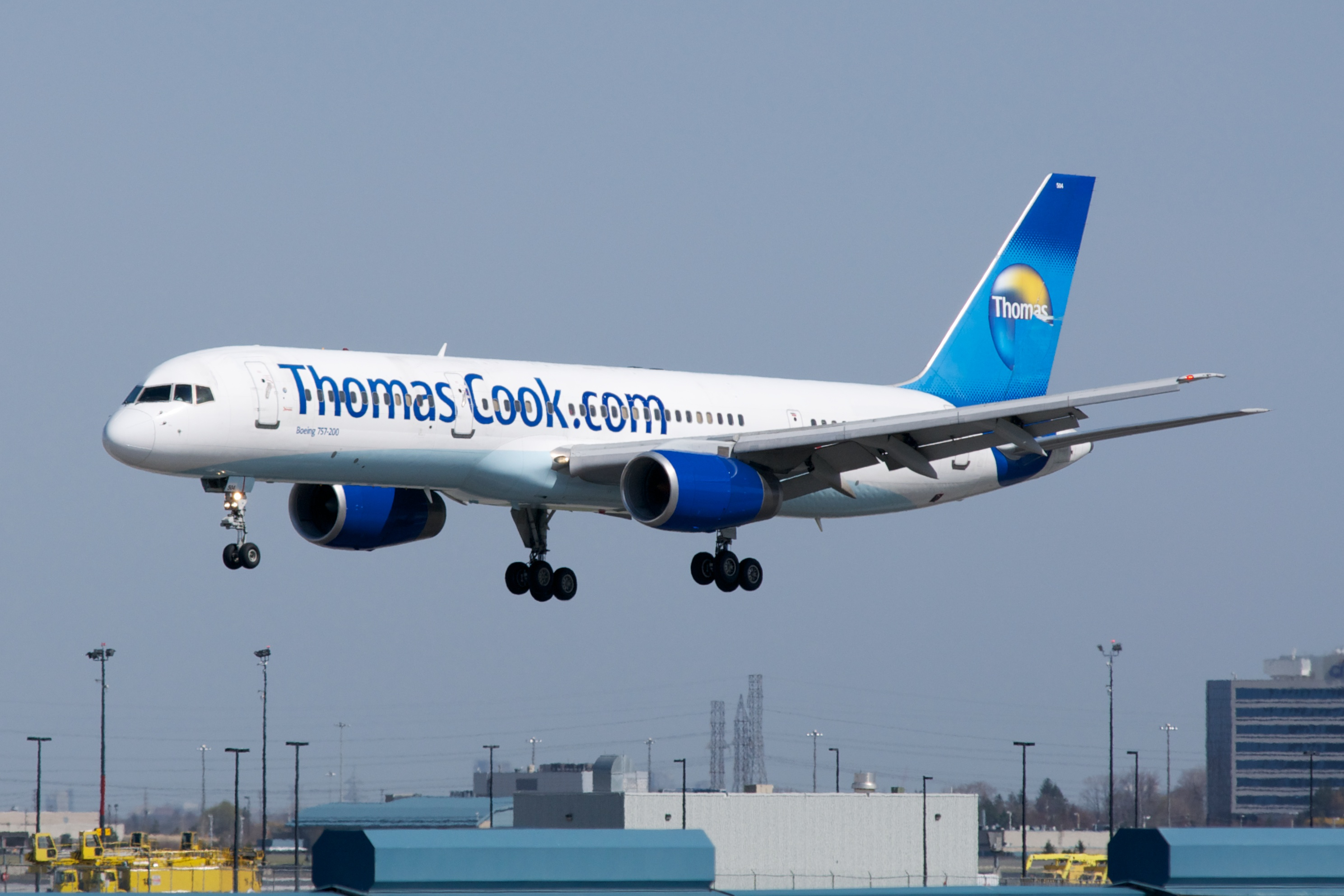
Boeing 757-200

In April 2010, Jazz Aviation LP had reached an agreement with Thomas Cook Group to operate a fleet of at least six Boeing 757-200 aircraft during the winter 2010 / 2011 season. The deal with Thomas Cook Group followed the collapse of Canadian airline Skyservice, which previously operated aircraft for Thomas Cook during the winter season. The aircraft, which were leased from British operator Thomas Cook Airlines, were used on flights to destinations in the Caribbean, Mexico, and Central America. On September 30, 2010, it was announced that the deal had been extended until 2015.

Sunquest charter service to sun destinations operated by Jazz Aviation, doing business as Thomas Cook Canada, began on November 5, 2010. However, on April 13, 2012, Thomas Cook Canada had terminated the remaining three years of the five-year flight services agreement with Jazz, and the service ended on April 30, 2012.

For the 2011 / 2012 season, flights departed from the Canadian airports at Toronto, Halifax, Calgary, and Vancouver. Destinations included Aruba, Nassau, Puerto Plata, Punta Cana, Montego Bay, Cancún, Cozumel, Puerto Vallarta, Los Cabos, and Curaçao.

=== PLUNA Líneas Aéreas Uruguayas S.A. ===
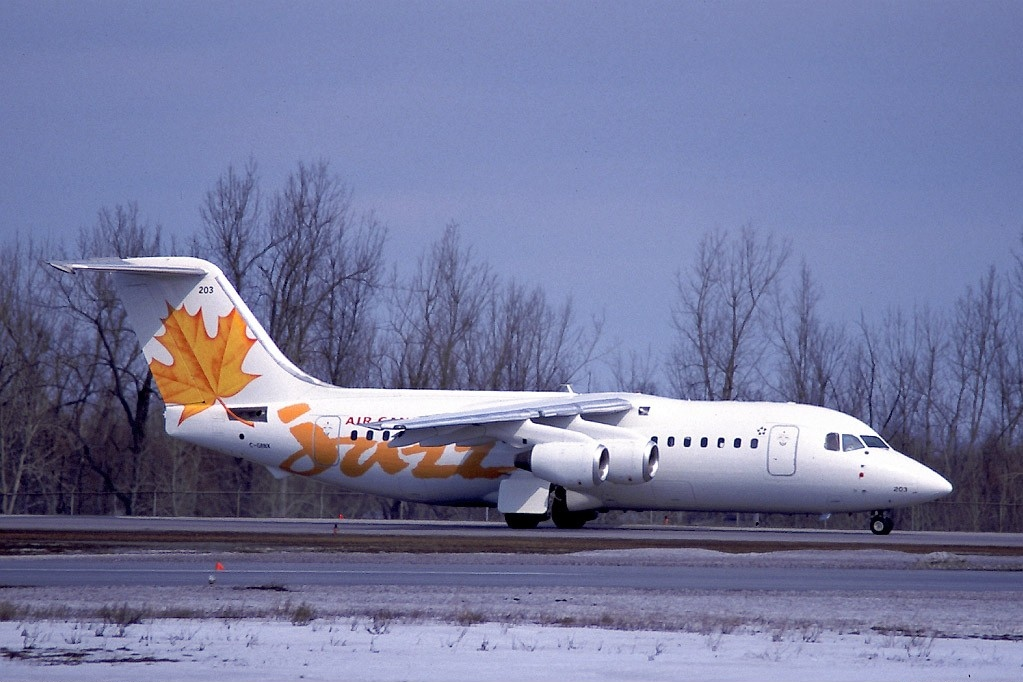
BAe 146-200, in yellow Jazz livery

In April 2010, Jazz Aviation purchased a one-third interest in the Latin American Regional Aviation Holding Corporation (LARAH). In turn, LARAH owns a 75% interest in PLUNA, the Uruguayan flag carrier, while the remaining 25% is owned by the Uruguayan government. PLUNA said on July 6, 2012, that it was "suspending all flights indefinitely" and announced that 720 of the 900 staff would be sent on unemployment pay until a new associate for the company is found or the airline is definitively sold.

== Destinations ==
Jazz serves 71 destinations across Canada and the United States.

== Fleet ==
As of October 16, 2026, the Jazz Aviation fleet listed with Transport Canada (TC) was:

Jazz Aviation fleet
Aircraft	In fleet	Passengers			Notes
Aircraft	In fleet	J	Y	Total	Notes
Bombardier CRJ900	30	12	64	76	All aircraft are listed as CL-600-2D24 (Series 900) by TC
De Havilland Canada DHC-8 Q400	31	–	78	78	All aircraft are listed as Dehavilland DHC-8-402 by TC
Embraer 175	25	12	64	76	All aircraft are listed as ERJ 170-200 SU by TC
Total	86				

Bombardier Aerospace delivered the first of its new regional jet variant, the 75-passenger Bombardier CRJ705 to Jazz Aviation on May 27, 2005. The aircraft was the first of 15 CRJ705 and 15 Bombardier CRJ200 aircraft ordered in September 2004. Originally, the order had been for 30 CRJ705s and 15 CRJ200s but was changed to 15 and 15, subsequently, 15 Embraer 175 aircraft were added to the Air Canada mainline fleet. A 16th CRJ705 was added to replace a CRJ100 which was written off. The new aircraft undertook its first revenue-earning flight on June 1, 2005, from Calgary to Houston. In mid-2006, the last Air Canada CRJ100 was transferred to Jazz.

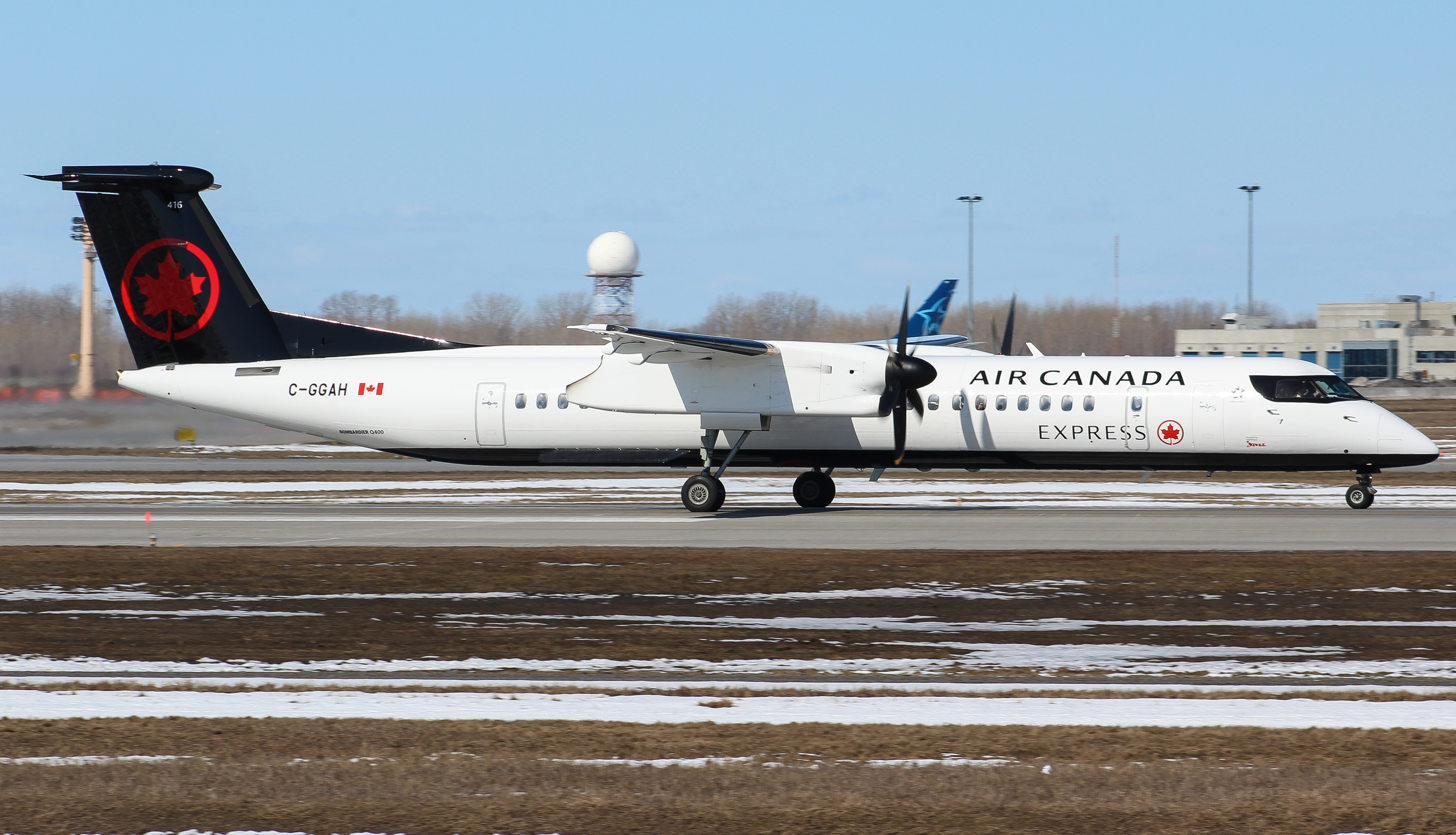
Jazz Aviation De Havilland Canada Dash 8 in the Air Canada Express livery

On February 9, 2010, Jazz Aviation announced that it had finalized an agreement with Bombardier Commercial Aircraft for 15 Q400 NextGen turboprops, with options for an additional 15 aircraft with deliveries to start in May 2011. They were to be configured in a 74-passenger, all-economy layout. The Q400s were used to replace older CRJ100/200 models which were returned to lessor. The Q400s were delivered in the new Air Canada Express paint scheme and were the first aircraft in the Jazz fleet to have the Air Canada Express branding.

On April 26, 2016, Jazz Aviation announced that the remaining CRJ705 aircraft would be converted to CRJ900s.

On January 14, 2019, Chorus Aviation, the parent company of Jazz Aviation, announced an extension to its Capacity Purchase Agreement (CPA) with Air Canada until 2035. Along with the extension of the CPA, 14 additional CRJ900 aircraft would be acquired, the first five of which would be sourced by Air Canada from SkyWest Airlines.

In 2021, Air Canada Express consolidated all of its regional flying to Jazz and transferred a fleet of Embraer 175 regional jets to the company from Sky Regional Airlines.

=== Historic fleet ===
Jazz Aviation historic fleet
Aircraft	In fleet	Notes
Boeing 757	6	Jazz operated the 200 series jet aircraft, branded as Thomas Cook Canada for the 2010-2013 winter seasons
Bombardier CRJ100	25	Jazz operated the CRJ100 series regional jet aircraft from 2004 to 2013 on behalf of Air Canada. The CRJ200 variant was operated until June 2024
British Aerospace 146		Air Canada Jazz previously operated the BAe 146-200, jet aircraft (on behalf of Air Canada) which was inherited from Air Nova and Air BC. They were retired from service in 2005.
De Havilland Canada Dash 8	28	Jazz operated 28 Series 300, turboprops for Air Canada Express. Retired from service with last commercial flight on January 9, 2022. They operated a 40 Series 100 turboprop. Retired from service with last commercial flight on May 6, 2020.
Fokker F28	30	Jazz operated the Fokker F28 jet aircraft under the Canadian Regional and then Air Canada Regional banners

== Cabins ==
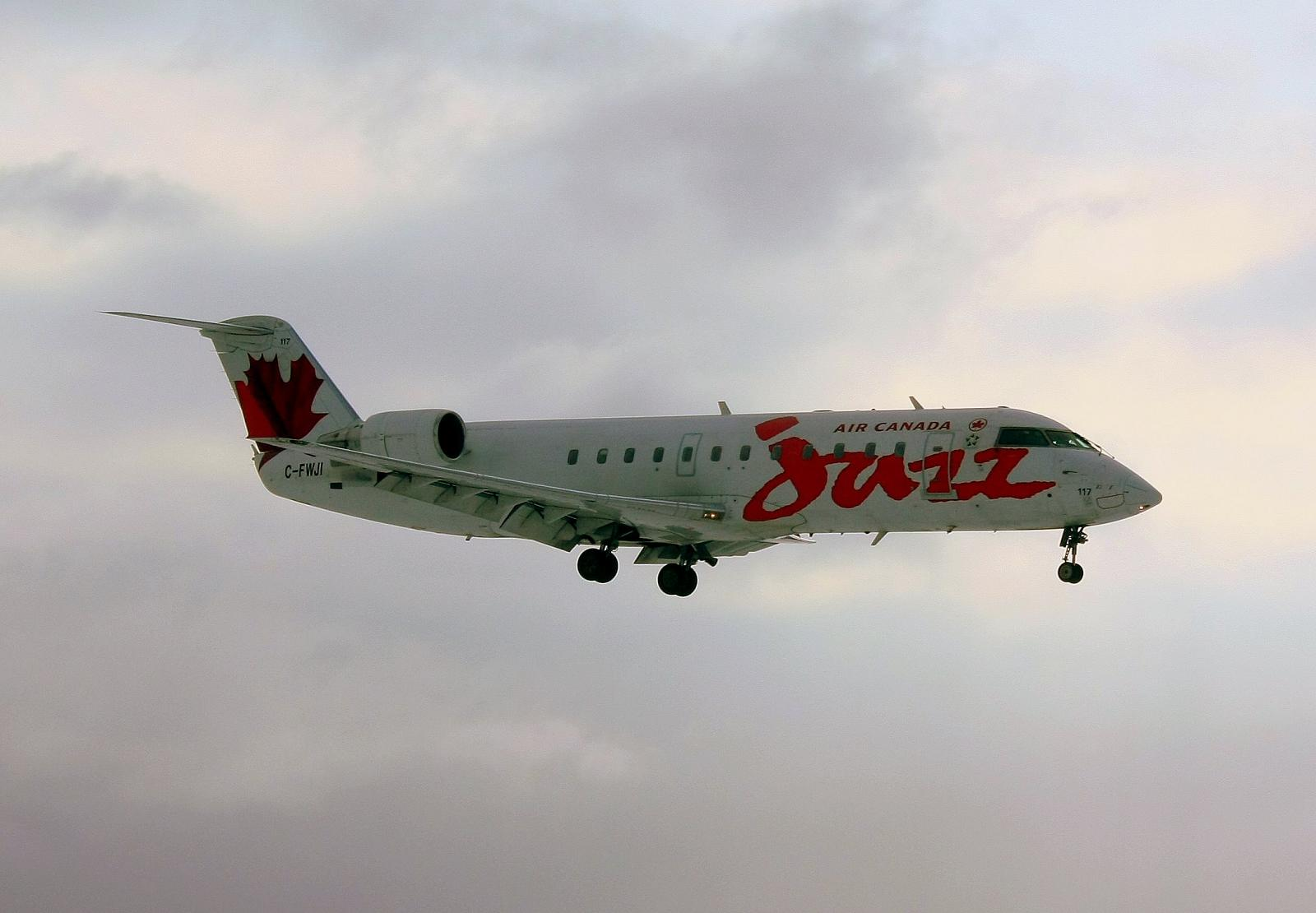
Bombardier CRJ100, in red Jazz livery

=== Business Class ===
Business Class is Air Canada's premium product in North America, and is offered by Jazz (doing business as Air Canada Express) on the CRJ-900 and E175. There are 12 leather covered seats, each equipped with a 120 V power outlet and personal audio/video on demand featuring Air Canada's enRoute inflight entertainment system by Thales. The newest 14 CRJ-900s are not equipped with audio/video on demand.

=== Economy Class ===
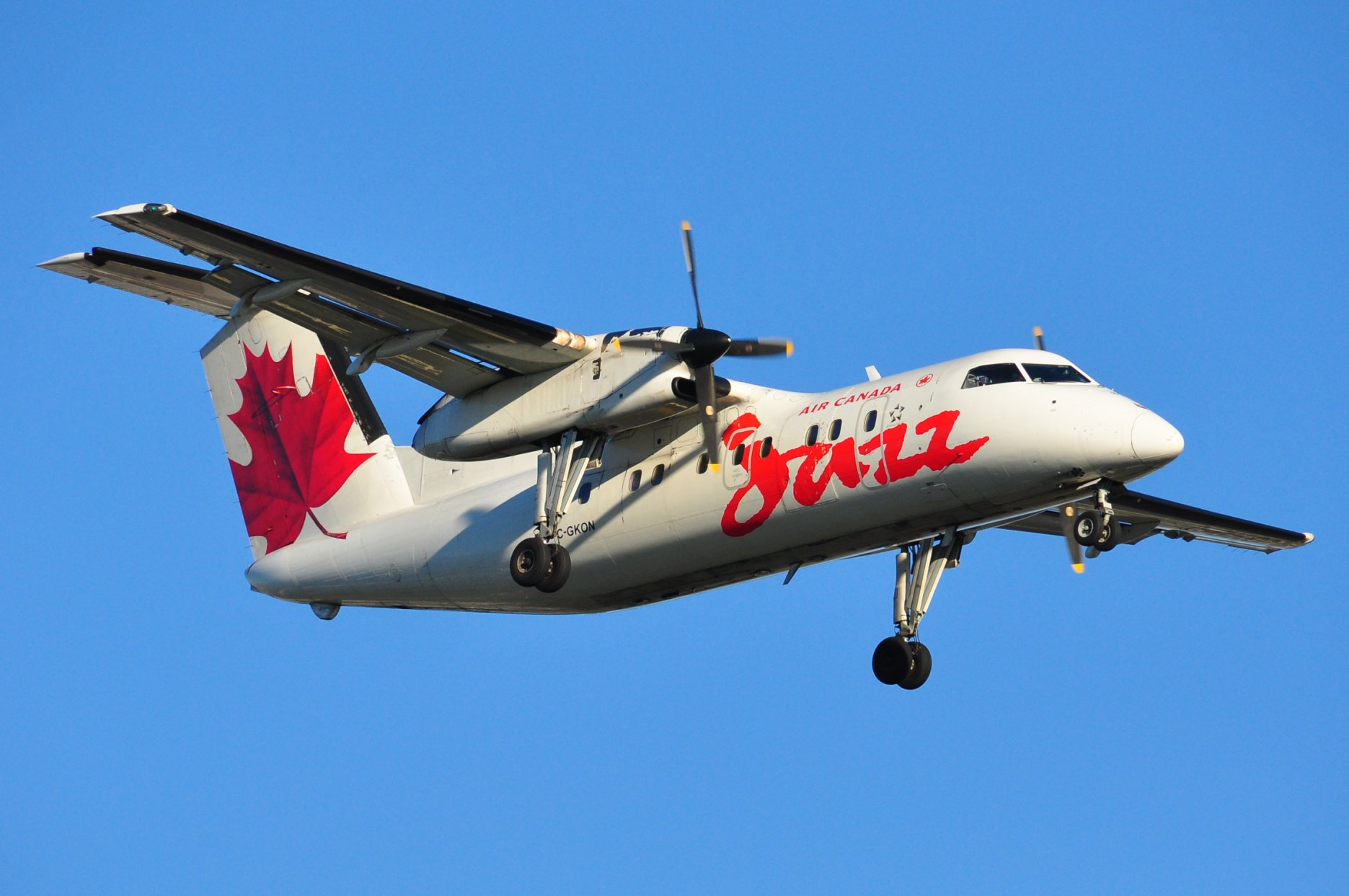
Dash 8-100, in red Jazz livery

Jazz's Dash 8-400 and CRJ-200 fleet feature all Economy Class cabins. The Dash 8-400s feature Bombardier's NextGen interior. The Dash 8-400s, CRJ-200s, and CRJ-900s (Economy Class) feature B/E Aerospace's Premium Economy Spectrum seat. The Economy Class seats on 21 CRJ-900 are equipped with personal audio/video on demand featuring Air Canada's enRoute inflight entertainment system by Thales, with seats from rows 12 to 18 having 120 V power outlets. 14 of the CRJ-900s do not feature seat back screens. Seating is 2 × 2 abreast.

In May 2024, Jazz and Expliseat announced that it will be retrofitting 25 Dash 8-400s with TiSeat 2V seats, replacing the NextGen interior.

== Onboard services ==
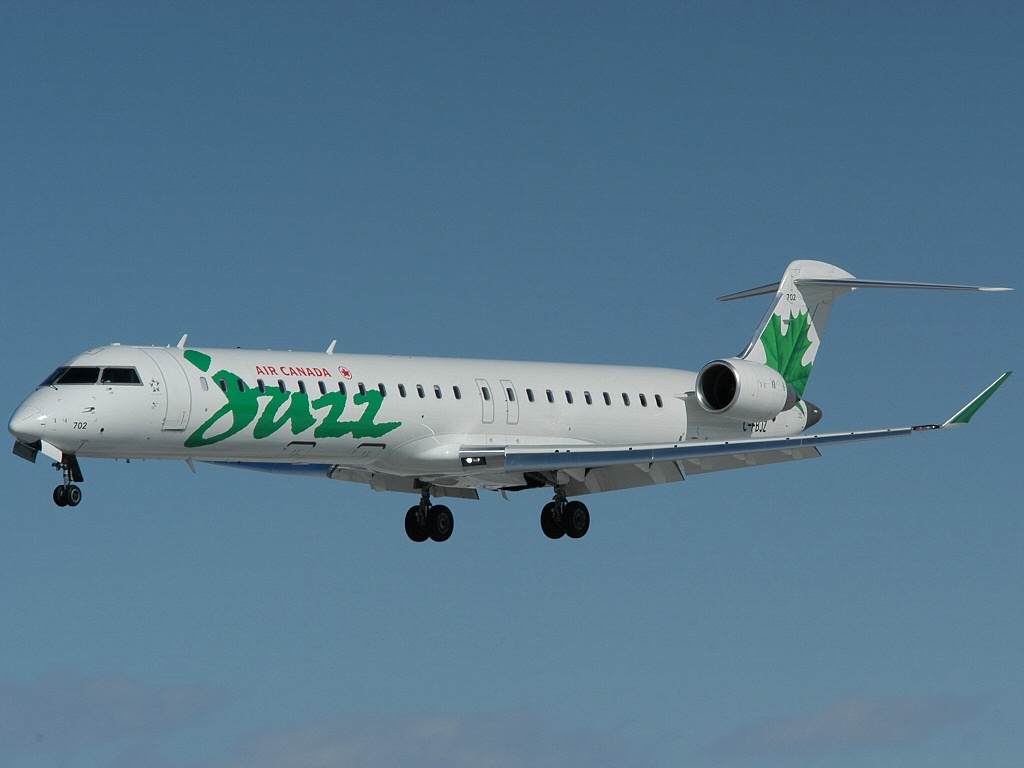
Canadair CL-600-2D15, in green Jazz livery

All Jazz flights operating for Air Canada offer a complimentary hot and cold beverage service as well as sweet or savoury snacks, with alcoholic beverages available for purchase. On flights over 90 minutes, Jazz operates a buy on board service for Air Canada called Air Canada Bistro offering snacks for purchase. On flights three hours and fifteen minutes or more in duration, sandwiches are added to the buy on board offering. Only major credit cards are accepted for payment on board.

== Accidents and incidents ==
- On May 20, 2007, Jazz Aviation flight 8911, operated by a Bombardier CRJ-100 registered C-FRIL, which originated in Moncton, had its main landing gear collapse at Toronto Pearson International Airport while turning from the runway onto the taxiway after an extremely hard landing. There were no injuries. The aircraft was written off and was cancelled from the Canadian Aircraft Register on July 18, 2007.
- On November 6, 2014, a Bombardier Q400 operating as Air Canada Express Flight 8481, originating in Calgary and destined for Grande Prairie, blew a tire upon takeoff. The plane diverted to Edmonton due to high cross winds in Calgary. As the plane landed the right landing gear failed and a propeller blade broke off and impacted the fuselage. Four passengers were injured and taken to hospital, the last being released two days later; all had minor injuries.
- On February 24, 2015, a Dash 8-100 operating Jazz Aviation flight 7795, originating in Toronto and destined for Sault Ste. Marie, struck a runway lead-in light on approach in poor weather conditions and was substantially damaged. No injuries were reported.
- On May 9, 2019, Jazz Aviation Flight 8615, Toronto (CYYZ) to Sudbury (CYSB) was operated by a Dash 8-300 with tail C-FJXZ. The flight departed for Sudbury and diverted back to Toronto due to bad weather in Sudbury. While taxiing back to the gate the plane was struck by a fuel truck. The left side of the aircraft sustained major damage to the nose cone, left propeller and left rear portion of the aircraft. At the time of the incident, there were five reported injuries cared for and transported by Peel Regional Paramedics to hospital.
- On March 22, 2026, Air Canada Express Flight 8646, a CRJ900 operated by Jazz from Montreal-Trudeau to New York-LaGuardia, collided with an airport crash tender crossing the runway while landing. Both pilots were killed, and 39 others were injured.
