= Chorus Aviation =

Canadian holding company

Chorus Aviation Inc.
- Formerly: Jazz Air Income Fund
- Type: Public
- Traded as: TSX: CHR
- Founded: February 2, 2006 as Jazz Air Income Fund
- Headquarters: Halifax, Nova Scotia, Canada
- Key people: Colin Copp (President and CEO) Gary Osborne (Chief Financial Officer) Randolph deGooyer (Chief Operating Officer)
- Subsidiaries: Jazz Aviation LP; Voyageur Airways; Cygnet Aviation Academy; Elisen & Associates; Kadex Aero Supply
- Website: chorusaviation.com

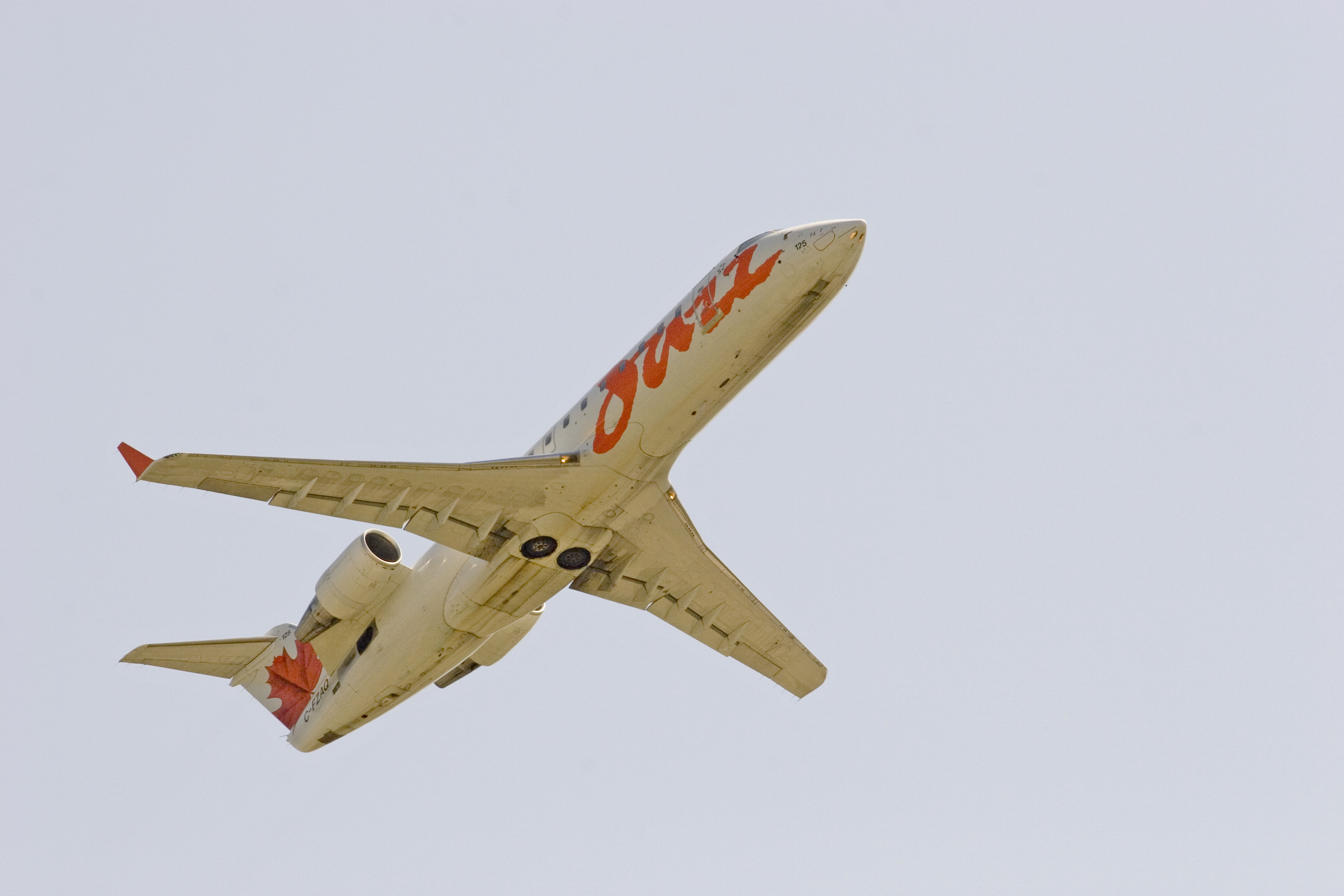
Canadair CL-600 (CRJ 100ER)

Chorus Aviation is a Canadian holding company which owns regional airlines Jazz Aviation LP and Voyageur Airways as well as lessor Chorus Aviation Capital.

Its headquarters is in the Dartmouth area of Halifax, Nova Scotia.

It was founded in 2006 as Jazz Air Income Fund, when then parent company ACE Aviation Holdings divested part of its interests in their regional airline business in an IPO. In 2008, ACE Aviation Holdings sold its remaining participation in the company. In 2011, it became a public corporation and changed its name to Chorus aviation, due to a change in Canadian tax laws which removed tax advantages for income funds, such changes prompting other income funds to restructure similarly.

In February 2011, Chorus reported that revenues had improved and that it had invested in the Uruguayan airline Pluna. After excessive losses, Pluna was shut down by the Uruguayan government on 5 July 2012, and Pluna's entire fleet was auctioned off on 1 October 2012.

Chorus aviation also acquired air charter company Voyageur Airways in 2015. Voyageur Airways provides chartered aircraft to the United Nations in support of various programmes in Africa.

On February 8, 2019, Chorus Aviation agreed to purchase nine CRJ900 regional jets from Bombardier in a deal valued at US$437 million. The aircraft are operated by Chorus subsidiary, Jazz Aviation, and were delivered in 2020.

In May 2022, it was announced Chorus has acquired the UK-based company, Falko Regional Aircraft Limited. In December 2024 Chorus completed the sale of Falko to HPS Investment Partners LLC.

On July 21, 2025 Chorus announced the acquisition of Montreal based Elisen and Associates

On April 1, 2026 Chorus acquired Peterborough ON based Kadex Aero Supply
