= Amin Khoury =

American businessman

- Education: Northeastern University (BS-Chemistry, MS-Chemistry, MBA)
- Occupation: CEO
- Employer: B/E Aerospace
- Organization: Raymond F. Kravis Center for the Performing Arts
- Spouse: Julie Khoury

Amin J. Khoury is an American businessman who has founded and developed companies in the scientific instrument, medical services, medical devices and semiconductor process equipment businesses. He co-founded B/E Aerospace, an S&P 400 and NASDAQ listed manufacturer of aircraft passenger cabin interior products for the commercial and business jet aircraft markets that employs approximately 9,600 people.

== Business history ==
=== Taghleef Industries Inc ===
Khoury founded Taghleef Industries Inc (formerly Applied Extrusion Technologies Inc.) and served as the Chairman from October 1986 to March 2005. He also served as President from August 1988 to November 1992 and as Chief Executive Officer from October 2002 to March 2005.

=== B/E Aerospace ===
Amin Khoury co-founded B/E Aerospace Inc (Nasdaq: BEAV) in July 1987. An investment group led by Khoury purchased Bach Engineering, a company that manufactured passenger control units for airline seats, in 1987. In 1989, the group purchased EECO Avionics, their primary competitor. This formed B/E Avionics and the company went public in 1990. The company changed its name to B/E Aerospace in 1992. Khoury has been a Director at B/E since founding it in 1987. He served as the Chief Executive Officer from July 1987 to April 1996, then again with his brother, Robert's retirement, from December 2005 to December 2014. He is the Executive Chairman of the Board, serving in that capacity since December 2014.

=== Synthes ===
Between 1986 and April 2012, Amin Khoury served as a non-executive Director at Synthes Inc., a medical device manufacturer. He was also a director at Johnson & Johnson.

=== Brooks Automation ===
Between July 1994 to May 2006, Khoury was the Lead Independent Director at Brooks Automation.

=== Advanced Thermal Sciences ===
Amin Khoury co-founded Advanced Thermal Sciences in July 2000 and served as the chief executive officer. He now serves as chairman and a director.

=== KLX Inc. ===
Khoury was the CEO and Chairman of KLX Inc., a provider of aerospace fasteners, consumables, and logistics services. In 2018, Boeing acquired KLX. KLX Energy Services was divested as part of this transaction.

On May 1, 2020, Khoury retired as chairman of KLX Energy Services for family health reasons.

=== Other business ===
Khoury is an advisor at D2K Equity Partners.

== Philanthropy and social responsibility ==
Khoury is involved with numerous charitable organizations. He was a Trustee of the Scripps Research Institute from May 2008 until July 2014. He also serves on the board of directors of the Raymond F. Kravis Center for the Performing Arts and is the chair of the center's Investment Committee.

Khoury and his wife established the Amin and Julie Khoury Endowed Scholarship at Northeastern University.

== Education and honors ==
Amin Khoury holds bachelor's and master's degrees in chemistry. He graduated summa cum laude from Northeastern University with a master's degree in business administration (MBA). He was also awarded the university's prestigious Medallion Achievement Award.

In addition to his academic education, Khoury holds a Masters Professional Director Certification from the American College of Corporate Directors and an Advanced Director Certification from the Corporate Directors Group.

In December 2018, Northeastern University named the Khoury College of Computer Sciences in honor of Khoury, who has endowed more than $50 million to the college.

== Trial ==
Khoury was acquitted in the Varsity Blues scandal.
