= Matías Campiani =

Argentine businessman

Matías Campiani is an American-educated Argentine businessman. He is a former partner of Leadgate, a private equity firm. He is also the former CEO of PLUNA, the national airline of Uruguay.

Campiani was imprisoned in Uruguay without charges from December 2013 to May 2015.

Gustavo Herrero, executive director of the Harvard Business School Latin American Research Center, told The New York Times that local politics were to blame for the imprisonment of Campiani and his private equity partners, stating they were “ideal scapegoats.” A Mercero Press report covering the Pluna imprisonment stated that there was a “political” side to Leadgate. According to this article, when Pluna Leadgate was launched in 2007, Agriculture Minister and future president José Mujica allegedly said: “I don’t like the looks of these cocky Argentines from Buenos Aires.”

In May 2015, the Supreme Court of Uruguay took up Campiani's appeal for release from jail. He was released on May 22, 2015. No formal charges have been filed against Camipani, as of May 2016.

Campiani holds a master's degree in Industrial Management from Carnegie Mellon University and a BA degree in Finance and Economics from Universidad Católica Argentina.
