= PLUNA =

National airline of Uruguay (1936–2012)

PLUNA Líneas Aéreas Uruguayas S.A.

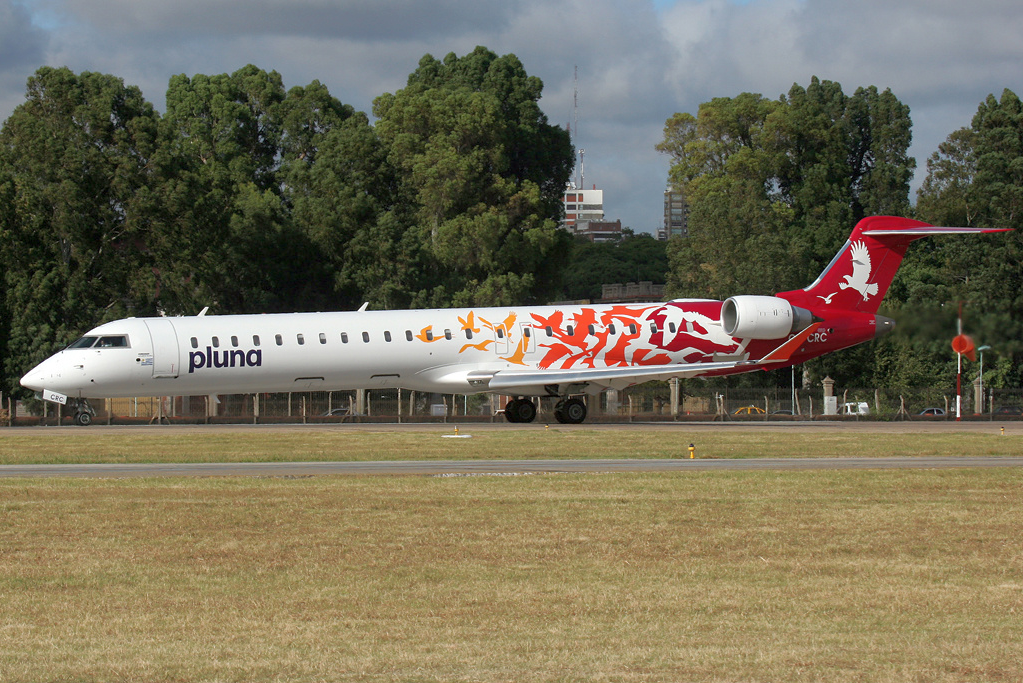
- CRJ-900ER
IATA	ICAO	Call sign
PU	PUA	PLUNA
- Founded: September 1936
- Commenced operations: 19 November 1936
- Ceased operations: 5 July 2012
- Hubs: Carrasco International Airport
- Focus cities: Capitán de Corbeta Carlos A. Curbelo International Airport
- Frequent-flyer program: Flyclub
- Parent company: Government of Uruguay (100%)
- Headquarters: Carrasco, Montevideo, Uruguay
- Key people: Sebastian Hirsch (CEO)

PLUNA Líneas Aéreas Uruguayas S.A. was the flag carrier of Uruguay. It was headquartered in Carrasco, Montevideo and operated scheduled services within South America, as well as scheduled cargo and charter services from its hub at Carrasco International Airport.

On 5 July 2012, only two days after the carrier's employees went on strike amid mounting financial difficulties, the Uruguayan government decided to close the airline down and liquidate it. The carrier was wholly owned by the government at the time of its closure.

== History ==
=== Foundation ===
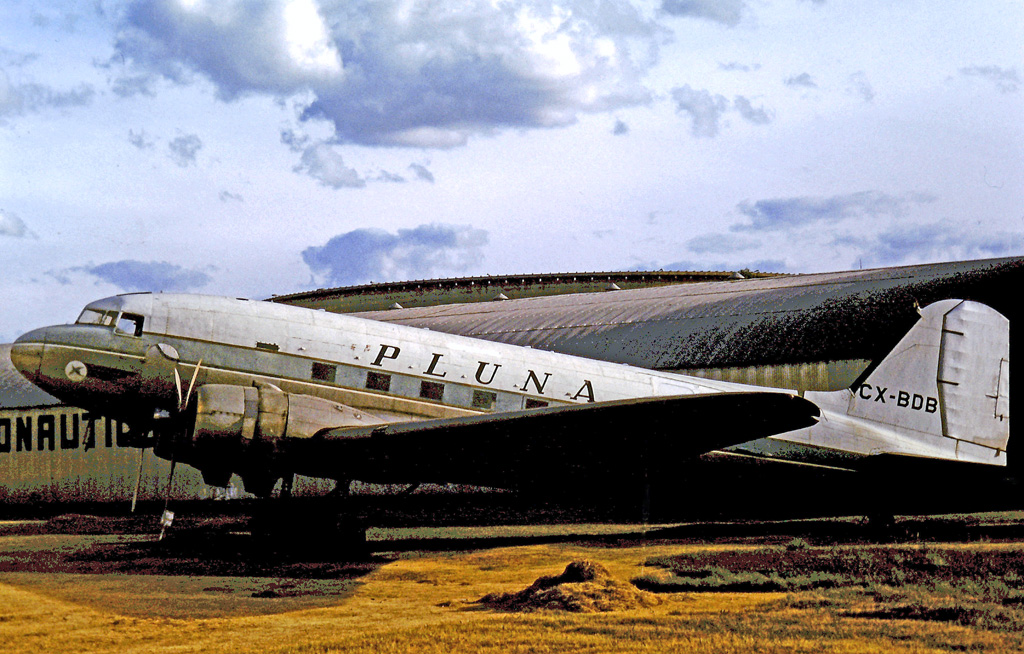
A Douglas DC-3 preserved at Montevideo in 1975

The airline was established in September 1936, and started operations the following month, on 19 November 1936. It was set up by Jorge and Alberto Márquez Vaesa, two brothers who had obtained the necessary financial and technical support through the ambassador of the United Kingdom to Uruguay at the time, Sir Eugen Millington-Drake. Millington-Drake wrote in his memoirs that he suggested the airline be named using a memorable acronym, taking SABENA as an example. It was then decided on "PLUNA", an acronym for Primeras Líneas Uruguayas de Navegación Aérea (English: First Uruguayan Air Navigation Lines). Millington-Drake knew De Havilland's representative in Buenos Aires at the time, which helped in the acquisition of the airline's first aircraft. The airline flew two five-seater de Havilland Dragonflys from Montevideo to Salto and Paysandú. The two planes were christened Churrinche and San Alberto, the latter in honor of the brothers' father. PLUNA flew 2,600 passengers in their first fiscal year, a huge success for that era. It also flew 20,000 pieces of mail and 70,000 newspapers.

The carrier saw the incorporation of both the Potez 62 and the Douglas DC-2 into its fleet in the early 1940s, the latter acquired from the U.S. government. Following the outbreak of World War II, PLUNA was forced to suspend operations between 1942 and 1944, due to the lack of spare parts. The delicate position PLUNA was in at this time led the Uruguayan Government to aid the company by boosting its stake to 85% on 16 October 1944. The first Douglas DC-3 entered PLUNA's fleet in February 1946. The airline launched regular services to Porto Alegre, Brazil, in May 1948. The carrier later added the cities of Santa Cruz in Bolivia and Buenos Aires, Rosario and Córdoba in Argentina to its network.

=== Nationalisation ===
The airline became a wholly government-owned company on 12 November 1951. After World War II, PLUNA's fleet included two Douglas DC-2s which were operated on the Montevideo–Paysandú–Salto route until they were retired in 1951. In the same year, a Douglas DC-3 and four de Havilland Herons were added to the fleet. The Herons only stayed in PLUNA's fleet for a short time and by 1957, they had been sold. The DC-3s remained in service much longer, and in 1971, the last four of them were sold to the Fuerza Aérea Uruguaya.

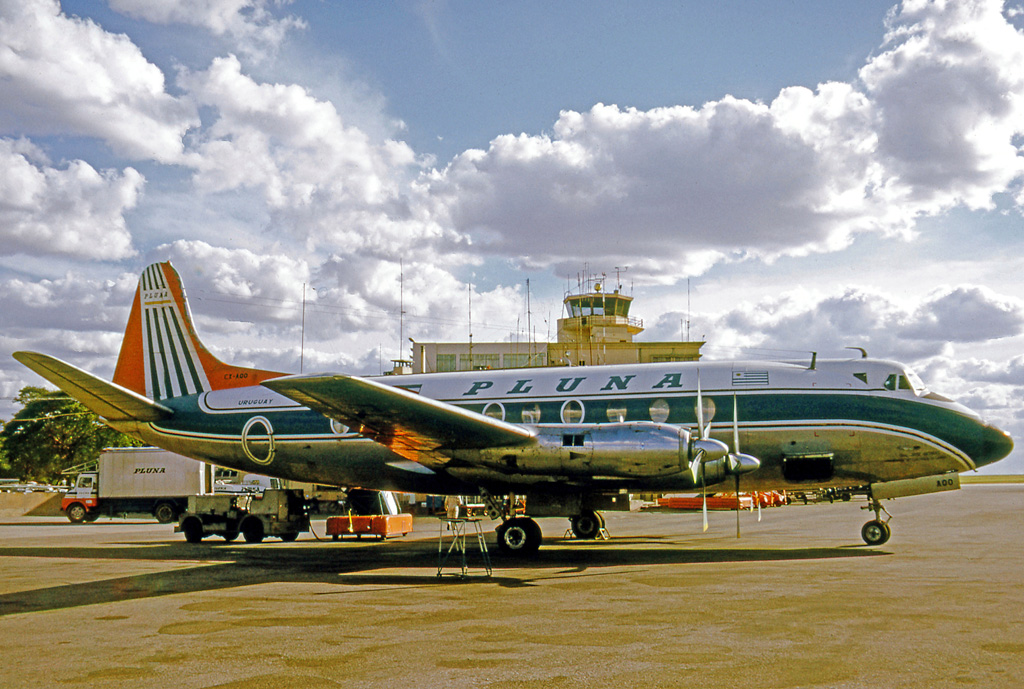
A Vickers Viscount 769D at Montevideo in 1975

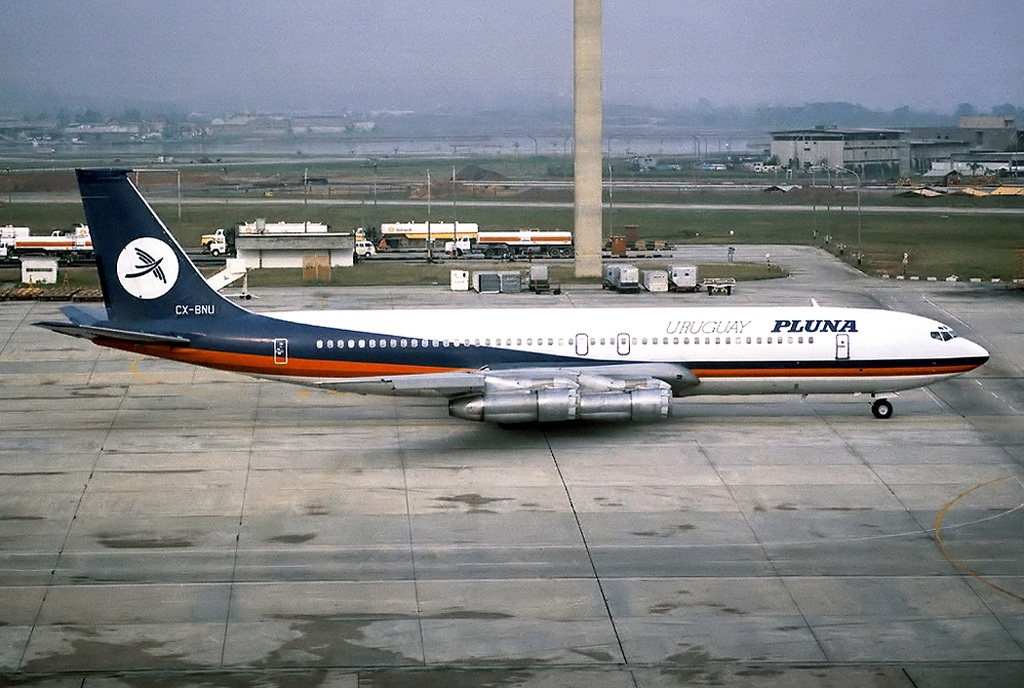
A Boeing 707 of PLUNA

São Paulo was added to the route network in January 1954. On 24 June 1958, the carrier entered the turbine era with the delivery of its first of three Vickers Viscounts four-engined turboprops purchased new from Vickers; it later acquired two Viscount 700s from Alitalia and three Viscount 800s from VASP.

PLUNA's growth slowed considerably for the next three decades, but it entered the jet age soon after jets were introduced to the world, and added John F. Kennedy International Airport (JFK) in New York, and Miami to its destinations, using Boeing 707 and Boeing 737 aircraft.

In the 1980s, PLUNA began flying to Madrid, Asunción, Rio de Janeiro and Santiago, but services to JFK and Miami were suspended. In the meantime, as the city of Punta del Este flourished as a major tourist destination, PLUNA benefited from that. During this time, an office was also opened in Tel Aviv, Israel.

=== Privatisation ===
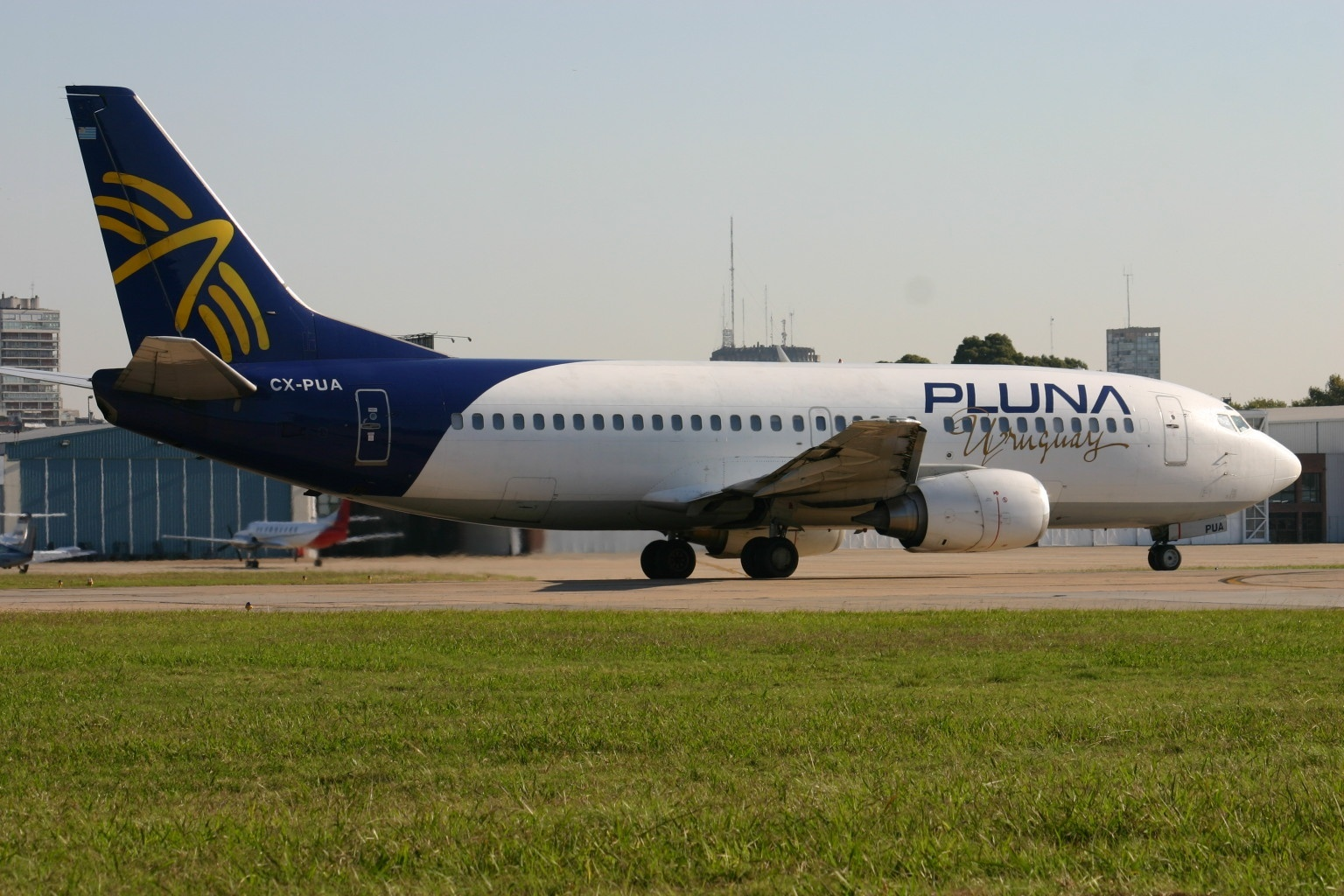
Pluna Uruguay Boeing 737

The 1990s, saw financial trouble loom for PLUNA. In 1995, the company was transformed into a public–private partnership and the government sold 51% of the shares to a holding formed by an Argentine consortium named Tevycom and Uruguayan businessmen; the holding later sold half of its participation in PLUNA to Varig.

At April 2000, the airline had 635 employees. At this time the fleet consisted of six Boeing 737-200 Advanced and one McDonnell Douglas DC-10-30 to serve a network that included Asunción, Buenos Aires, Cordoba, Florianópolis, Madrid, Montevideo, Punta del Este, Rio de Janeiro, Rosario, Salvador, Santiago and São Paulo. By late June 2005, the airline's major shareholders were the Government of Uruguay (49%) and Varig (49%), and private investors held the balance. When Varig entered Chapter 11 bankruptcy protection on 17 June 2005, it sought a bidder for its 49% stake in PLUNA. For almost a year, it looked as if it might go to Venezuela's state-run Conviasa, but the deal officially fell through in July 2006.

On 4 January 2007, the Government of Uruguay started negotiations to sell 75% of it shares to a private consortium of investors from Germany, United States, Uruguay and Argentina called Leadgate Investment, a subsidiary of Latin American Regional Aviation Holding Corporation (LARAH), that committed to inject US$177 million in the company. In July the same year, the government awarded 75% of PLUNA's stock to LARAH, and the acquisition of seven Bombardier CRJ-900s in a deal worth US$261 million was announced.

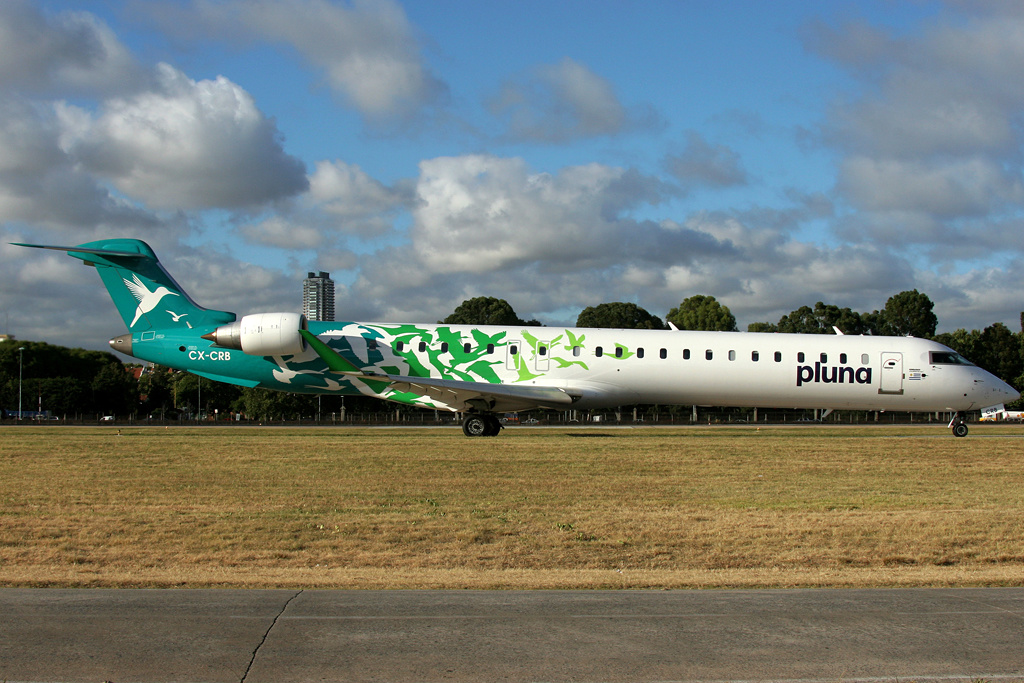
A CRJ900 at Aeroparque Jorge Newbery in 2009.

In late October 2007, PLUNA presented its new corporate image, developed by Australian design company Cato Partners. This new image is based on the interpretation of the name "Uruguay" as meaning "river of the painted birds" or "river of the colorful birds" (Spanish: Río de los pájaros pintados). The first of seven brand new CRJ900s that would be incorporated into the fleet during 2008 arrived in March that year; these new aircraft permitted increasing frequencies to existing routes, as well as expanding services to new destinations.

In April 2010, the Canadian airline holding company Jazz Air Income Fund invested US$15 million in LARAH. The move gave this holding an indirect control of 25% of the Uruguayan flag carrier, as LARAH had a participation of 75% into PLUNA at that time; the Government of Uruguay held the balance.

In September and October 2010, three additional new CRJ900s aircraft were delivered from the Bombardier factory. In April 2011, three options were taken up for delivery at the end of 2011 and these were delivered between September and November 2011. With these additions, PLUNA's fleet consisted of 13 airplanes, the highest number in its history.

=== Collapse ===
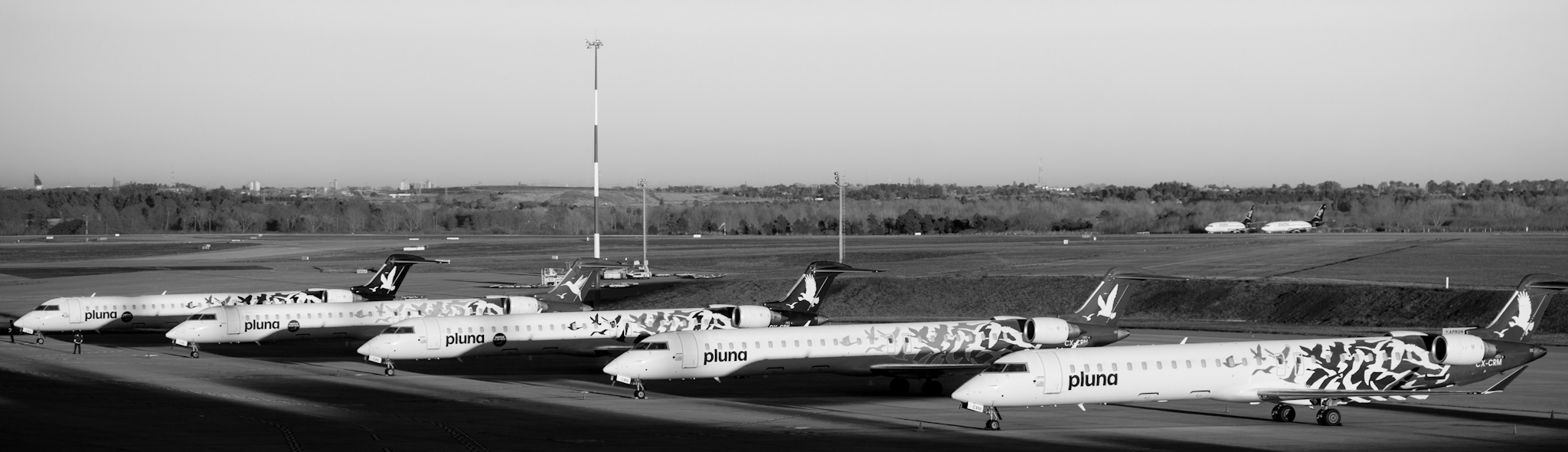
Five Pluna CRJ 900 aircraft

In early June 2012, PLUNA's then CEO, Matías Campiani, disclosed that the airline might face collapse amid a financial distress that led to a loss of US$18 million for the eight months ending in February the same year, partly due to the protectionism of the government of Argentina —where the carrier concentrated 21% of its operations— following the renationalisation of Aerolíneas Argentinas in 2008, and partly due to the slowdown of the Brazilian economy in the preceding months. Later on, with losses totalling US$300 million, Leadgate disposed of their 75% stake in the airline, transferring it back to the Uruguayan government. By that time, that percentage of PLUNA's stock was owned by LARAH, which was in turn 75% owned by Leadgate and 25% by Jazz Air. Despite being initially disclosed that Jazz Air was not interested in taking over the entire 75% stock, and that it was later informed that the Canadian airline was evaluating the acquisition, the government suspended PLUNA's operations on 5 July 2012—following a strike that started two days earlier, after failing to find new investors for the company. The government announced that both PLUNA's fleet and routes would be auctioned. It seemed there were no plans for the government to have any stake in PLUNA's successor.

In September 2012, the auction of the seven Bombardier aircraft that belonged to the liquidated carrier was delayed until October 2012 as there were no bidders. Cosmo Airlines, a Spanish charter carrier, eventually purchased the seven aircraft at a price of $137 million. Regionally, the void created by PLUNA's collapse benefited foreign airlines on some routes.

In 2016, a Uruguayan court concluded that no Leadgate executives were responsible for Pluna's collapse. Two years later, in 2018 a Panamanian-based investment consortium named Caballero Verde S. de R.L. took ownership of LARAH, which still owned 75% of Pluna's shares. The consortium plans to seek compensation from the Uruguayan government for Pluna's demise.

== Destinations ==
As of April 2011, PLUNA linked Uruguay with two destinations in Argentina, one in Chile, one in Paraguay, and eight in Brazil. The following is a list of destinations that were served by PLUNA as part of its scheduled services throughout its history:

Country	City	Airport	Notes	Refs
Argentina	Buenos Aires	Aeroparque Jorge Newbery		
Argentina	Buenos Aires	Ministro Pistarini International Airport		
Argentina	Córdoba	Ingeniero Aeronáutico Ambrosio L.V. Taravella International Airport		
Argentina	Rosario	Islas Malvinas International Airport		
Brazil	Belo Horizonte	Tancredo Neves International Airport		
Brazil	Brasília	Brasília International Airport		
Brazil	Campinas	Viracopos-Campinas International Airport		
Brazil	Curitiba	Afonso Pena International Airport		
Brazil	Florianópolis	Hercílio Luz International Airport		
Brazil	Foz do Iguaçu	Foz do Iguaçu International Airport		
Brazil	Porto Alegre	Salgado Filho International Airport		
Brazil	Rio de Janeiro	Rio de Janeiro/Galeão International Airport		
Brazil	Salvador	Deputado Luís Eduardo Magalhães International Airport		
Brazil	São Paulo	São Paulo/Guarulhos International Airport		
Chile	Santiago	Arturo Merino Benítez International Airport		
Paraguay	Asunción	Silvio Pettirossi International Airport		
Spain	Madrid	Adolfo Suárez Madrid–Barajas Airport		
United States	Miami	Miami International Airport		
Uruguay	Montevideo	Carrasco International Airport	Hub	
Uruguay	Punta del Este	Capitán de Corbeta Carlos A. Curbelo International Airport		

=== Codeshare agreements ===
PLUNA had a codeshare agreement with Iberia, which operates the Montevideo–Madrid–Montevideo route. Under the same codeshare agreement, passengers also connected from Madrid to many destinations within Spain and also to Frankfurt. PLUNA also announced a codeshare agreement with American Airlines, which would have placed PLUNA's code on American's Miami-Montevideo route, if it had government approval.

== Fleet ==
=== Fleet at bankruptcy ===
Prior to its collapse, PLUNA's fleet consisted of the following aircraft, as of June 2012.

PLUNA fleet at bankruptcy
Aircraft	Total	Passengers (Economy)	Notes
Bombardier CRJ900	13	90	
Total	13		

=== Historical fleet ===
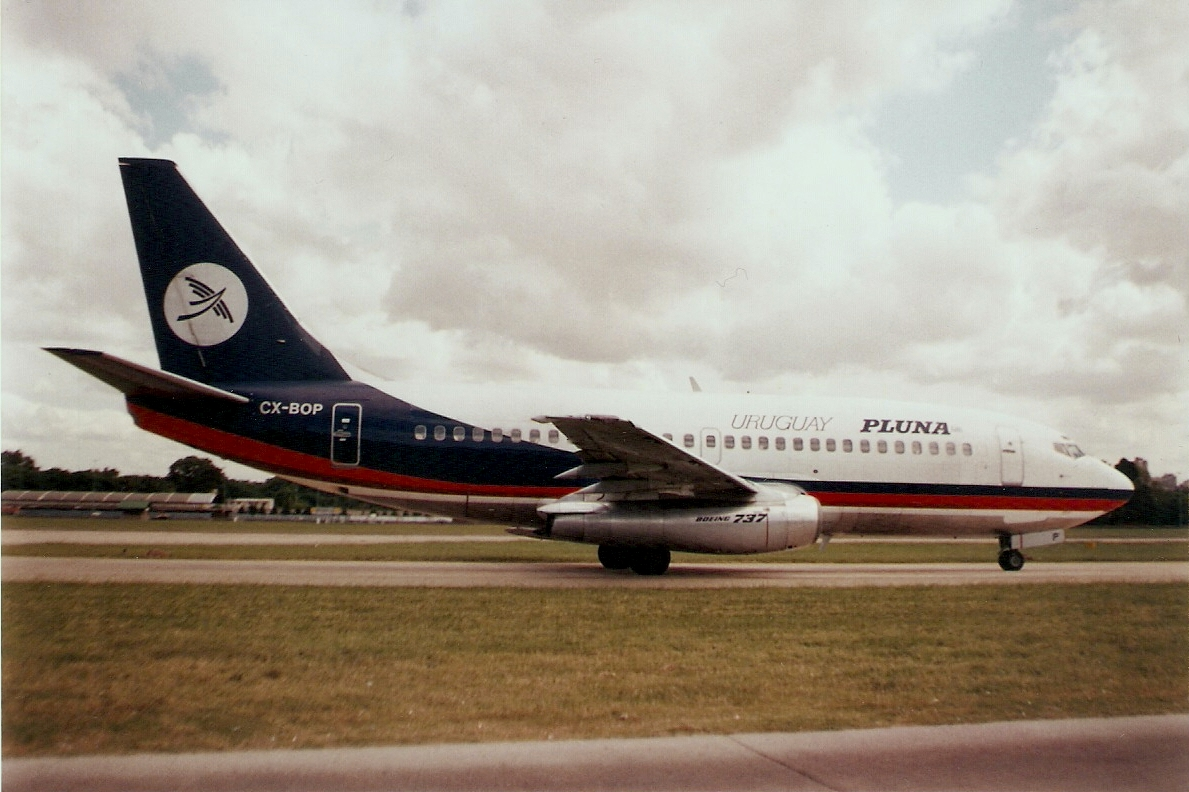
A Boeing 737-200 Advanced in the pre-Varig paint scheme, taxiing at Aeroparque Jorge Newbery in 1993.

The carrier also operated the following aircraft types throughout its history:

PLUNA historical fleet
Aircraft	Total	Introduced	Retired	Notes
ATR 42-320	1	2004	2008	
Airbus A330-200	1	2006	2007	Leased from Middle East Airlines.
Boeing 707-320B	6	1985	1995	
Boeing 727-100C	3	1978	1984	
Boeing 737-200 Advanced	8	1969	2009	
Boeing 737-300	2	1995	2008	
Boeing 737-800	1	2006	2007	Leased from Travel Service.
Boeing 757-200	1	2003	2008	
Boeing 767-300ER	3	2002	2009	
de Havilland Dragonfly	2	1936	1939	
de Havilland D.H.86B Express	2	1937	Unknown	
de Havilland Heron	4	1953	1958	
Douglas C-47 Skytrain	10	1946	1979	Some aircraft were used for spare parts only.
Douglas DC-2	2	1942	1954	
Douglas DC-8-61	1	1991	1992	
Douglas DC-8-62	1	1991	1992	Leased from Nationair.
Embraer EMB-110 Bandeirante	5	1975	Unknown	
Fairchild Hiller FH-227D	2	1975	1990	
Fokker F27-100 Friendship	2	1975	1977	
Lockheed L-1011-500 Tristar	1	2002	2006	Leased from EuroAtlantic Airways.
McDonnell Douglas DC-10-30	1	1994	1997	Leased from Varig.
Potez 62	1	1941	Unknown	
Vickers Viscount 700D	5	1958	1977	
Vickers Viscount 800	3	1975	1986	

== Accidents and incidents ==
PLUNA had only one fatal accident with the loss of ten crew members, the Aviation Safety Network records 3 hull-loss accidents/incidents for the airline.

- 8 January 1946: A Douglas DC-2-124, registration CX-AEG, was destroyed during a thunderstorm in Uruguay.
- 9 October 1962: A Douglas C-47A, registration CX-AGE, crashed during a final test flight. The crash occurred during takeoff from Carrasco International Airport, when the right wing grazed the runway, bouncing the aircraft and causing the right tire to burst, then bouncing the aircraft again causing the engine to smash into the ground at almost full throttle, and finally rolling over and coming to rest upside down. A fire broke out shortly afterwards. All 10 crew members died.
- 11 May 1975: A Vickers 769D Viscount, registration CX-AQO, flying a scheduled Carrasco International Airport–Buenos Aires-Aeroparque service, ran off the end of the runway at the destination airport on landing. The damage wrote off the aircraft. All 57 passengers and crew survived the incident.

== See also ==
- Transport in Uruguay
- List of defunct airlines of South America
