= Voyageur Airways =

Canadian charter airline and medevac service

Voyageur Airways Limited

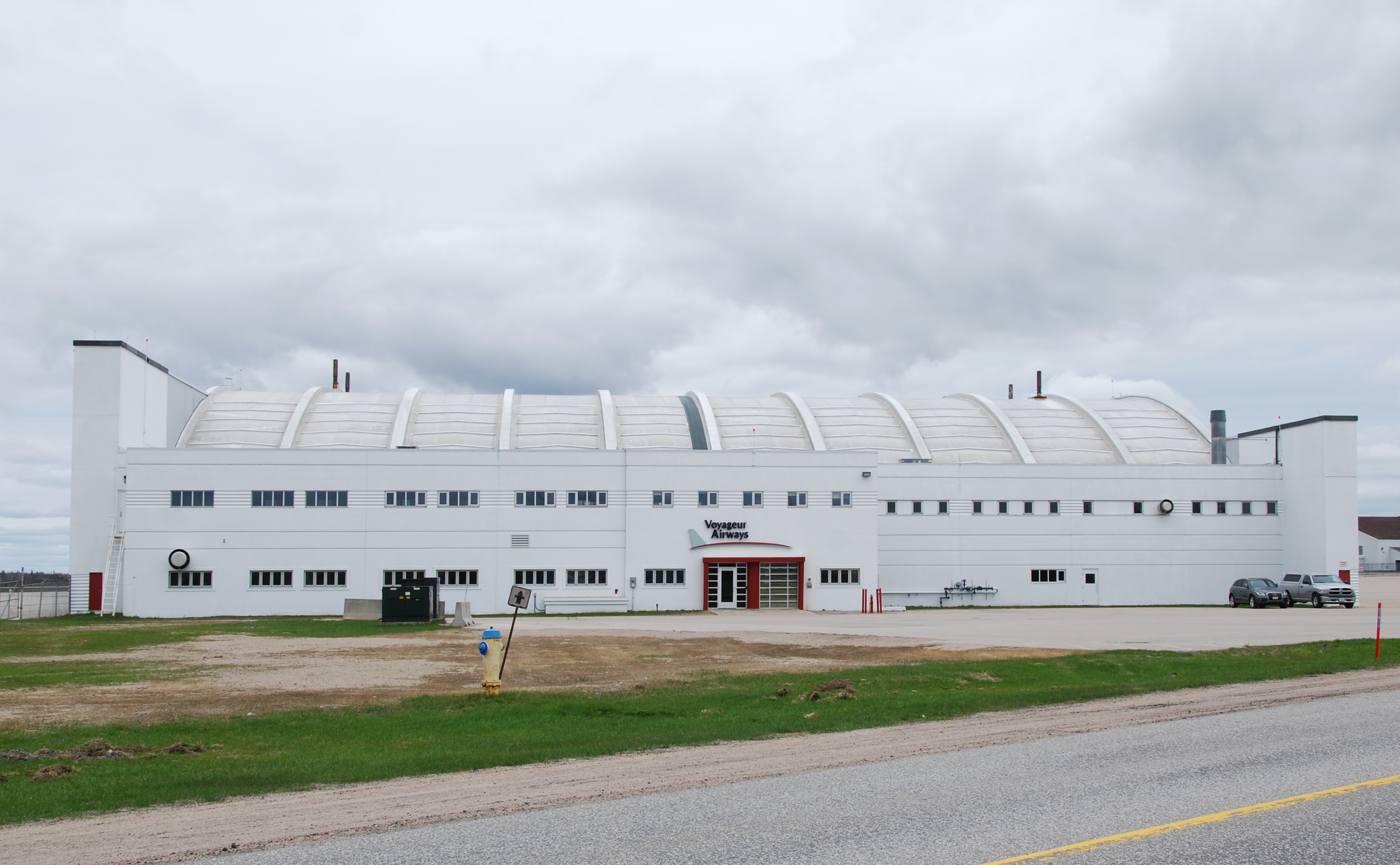
- The headquarters of Voyageur Airways in North Bay, Ontario
IATA	ICAO	Call sign
VC	VAL	VOYAGEUR
- Founded: 1968
- AOC #: Canada: 2473, United States: VEXF827I
- Hubs: North Bay/Jack Garland Airport
- Fleet size: 52
- Parent company: Chorus Aviation
- Headquarters: North Bay, Ontario
- Key people: Cory Cousineau, President
- Website: airways.voyav.com/

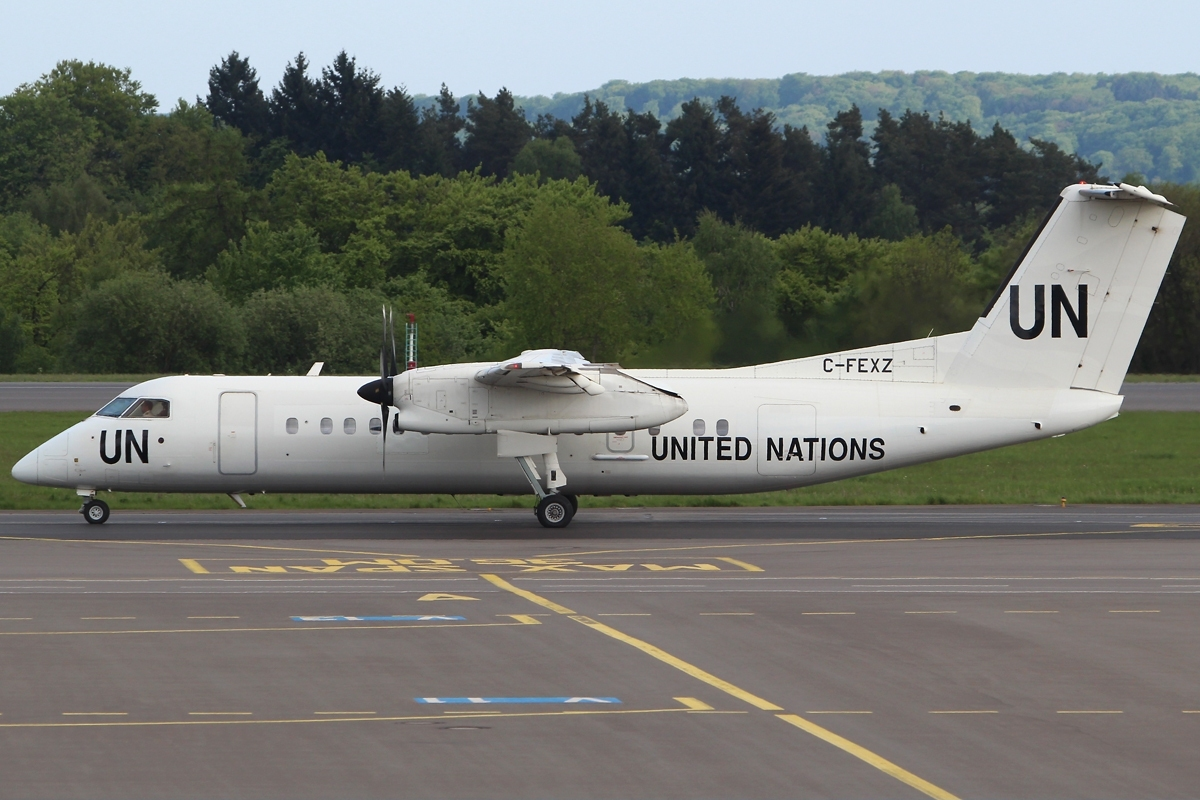
Voyageur Airways Bombardier Dash 8 in Luxembourg

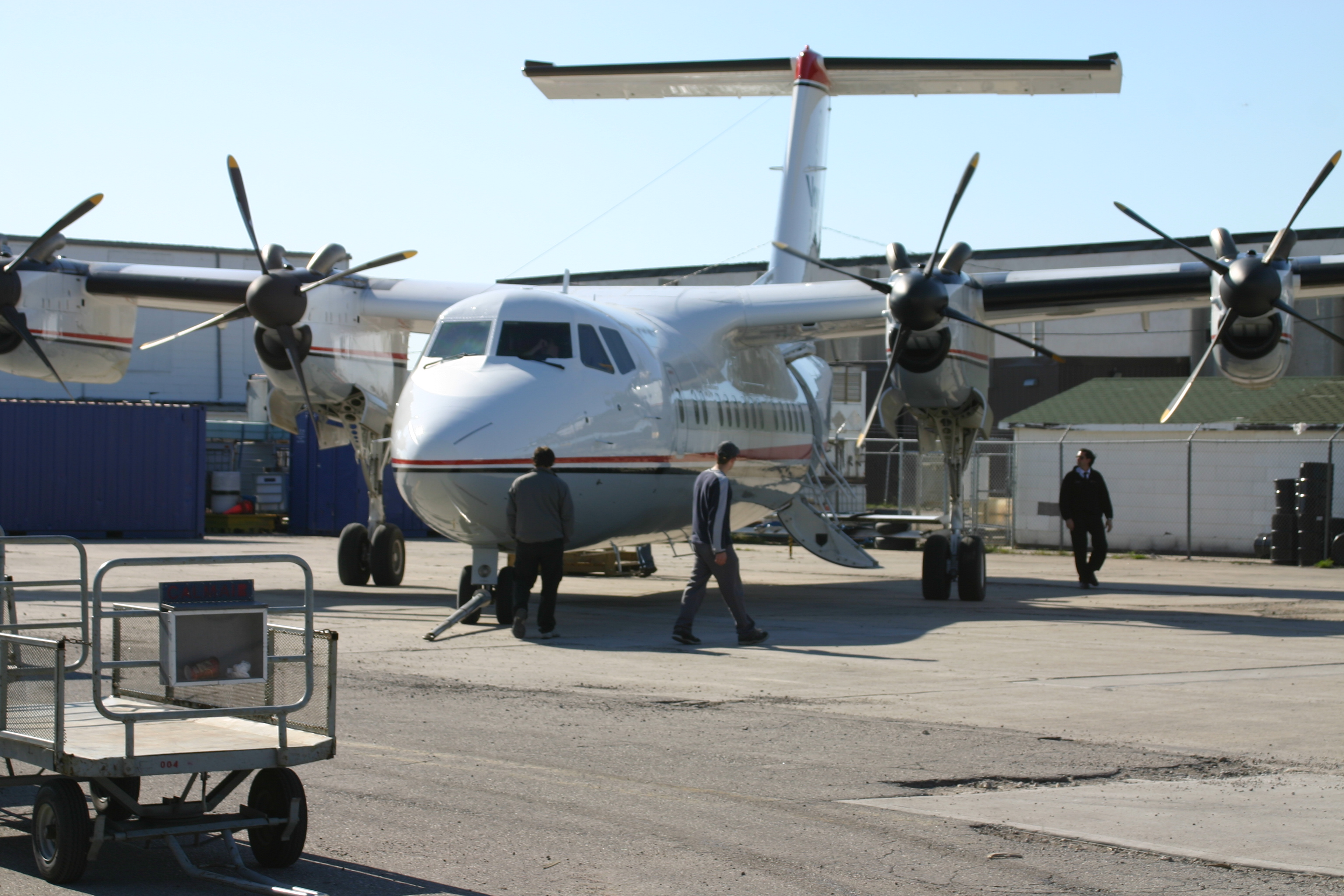
Voyageur Airways Dash 7 in Winnipeg, 2005

Voyageur Aviation operating as Voyageur Airways Limited is an airline based in North Bay, Ontario, Canada that commenced operations in 1968. Along with air charters it also repairs and maintains aircraft, and provides an air ambulance service. It provides ground handling, fuel services and terminal services at the North Bay/Jack Garland Airport. It provides chartered aircraft to the United Nations and NATO, for operations in places such as Afghanistan, Democratic Republic of Congo, Chad, Ivory Coast and Sudan. These aircraft include Bombardier Dash 8 turboprops as well as Bombardier CRJ200 regional jets.

== Fleet ==
As of August 2022, Voyageur Airways had the following aircraft registered with Transport Canada:

Voyageur Airways fleet
Aircraft	Variants	Number	Notes
Beechcraft King Air	Super King Air 200	2	Air ambulance
Bombardier CRJ	CL-600 2B19 (Series 200)	7	Up to 50 passengers
Bombardier Dash 8	DHC-8-102, DHC-8-311, DHC-8-314, DHC-8-402	24	Up to 37 passengers in the 102 and 50 in the 300 series. The 402 can carry 78 passengers but is not listed at the Transport Canada site.
Total		33	

According to Voyageur Airways they also operate de Havilland Canada Dash 7 as air ambulance.

== Destinations in 1987 ==
Although no longer operating scheduled flights, according to its May 10, 1987 system timetable, Voyageur Airways was operating scheduled service at that time to the following destinations in the Canadian provinces of Ontario and Quebec:

=== Ontario ===
- Manitouwadge
- Marathon
- North Bay - home base
- Ottawa
- Peterborough
- Sudbury
- Toronto
- Windsor

=== Quebec ===
- Montreal
- Rouyn
- Val-d'Or

Currently Voyageur Airways operates charters and does aircraft servicing.

== Manned airborne intelligence, surveillance and reconnaissance (MAISR) ==
On May 13, 2021, the Government of Canada announced an 8-year in-service support and maintenance contract to Team CERTAS, consisting of General Dynamics Mission Systems–Canada (from Ottawa, Ontario) and Voyageur Aviation Corporation (from North Bay, Ontario). The estimated contract value is $72 million.
