= OWG =

Canadian airline

IATA	ICAO	Call sign
N5	NRL	NOLINOR
- Founded: July 6, 2020; 6 years ago
- Commenced operations: December 18, 2020; 5 years ago
- Ceased operations: May 1, 2025
- Operating bases: Montréal–Trudeau; Toronto–Pearson
- Fleet size: 3
- Destinations: 6
- Parent company: Nolinor Aviation
- Headquarters: Mirabel, Quebec, Canada
- Key people: Marco Prud’Homme (President)
- Employees: 300
- Website: www.owg.com/en

OWG, standing for Off We Go, was a Canadian virtual airline and division of charter airline Nolinor Aviation. It operated flights to leisure destinations from Montréal Trudeau and Toronto Pearson airports.

== History ==
On July 6, 2020, Nolinor Aviation announced OWG as its new airline. The airline planned to operate a fleet of Boeing 737-400 aircraft in an all-economy configuration of 158 seats, targeting leisure travel to southern destinations. On July 13, 2020, OWG announced that it would partner with Canadian travel operator Hola Sun Holidays to operate dedicated flights to Cuba on behalf of the company. Its inaugural flight to Cuba departed on December 18, 2020, having originally been planned for August 31, 2020, while the airline operated charter flights within Canada for an interim period beginning on October 18, 2020.

The company ceased its flights to the Caribbean in 2021 at the request of the Canadian government, as a result of the COVID-19 pandemic. The company planned to restart flights in late 2021 using one Boeing 737-800 aircraft, although the 737-800 did not enter service until 2022.

== Destinations ==
As of July 2022, OWG has operated to the following destinations:

Country	City	Airport	Start date	End date	Notes	Ref
Canada	Montréal	Montréal–Trudeau International Airport	December 18, 2020	May 1, 2025	Base	
Canada	Toronto	Toronto Pearson International Airport	December 18, 2020	May 1, 2025	Base	
Cuba	Cayo Coco	Jardines del Rey Airport	July 3, 2022	May 1, 2025		
Cuba	Holguín	Frank País Airport	June 30, 2022	May 1, 2025		
Cuba	Santa Clara	Abel Santamaría Airport	December 18, 2020	May 1, 2025		
Cuba	Varadero	Juan Gualberto Gómez Airport	July 2, 2022	May 1, 2025		

== Fleet ==
Prior to closure, the OWG fleet (operated by Nolinor Aviation) under its air operator's certificate (AOC), comprising the following aircraft as of March 2024:

Aircraft	In service	Orders	Passengers	Notes
Boeing 737-400	2	—	158	
Boeing 737-800	1	—	189	
Total	3	—		
