= Dawn Iacobucci =

American Professor at the Owen Graduate School of Management

Dawn Iacobucci (born c. 1960) is an American quantitative psychologist and marketing researcher, Professor in Marketing at the Owen Graduate School of Management, known for her work in the field of foundations of marketing research.

== Biography ==
Iacobucci studied at the University of Illinois at Urbana–Champaign, where she obtained her BSc in Liberal Arts and Sciences in 1982, and both her MA in 1985 and her PhD in 1987 in Quantitative Psychology. In 1999 she also obtained a MS in Theological Studies at Garrett–Evangelical Theological Seminary.

Iacobucci started her academic career at the Kellogg School of Management of the Northwestern University in 1987 as assistant professor of marketing. She became Tenured associate professor of marketing in 1989, Professor of Marketing in 1996, and was Professor of Marketing and Professor of Health Services Management from 1998 to 2004. In 2004 she moved to the Wharton School of the University of Pennsylvania, where she was appointed Professor of Marketing, and was John J. Pomerantz Professor in Marketing from 2005 to 2007. In 2007 she then moved to the Owen Graduate School of Management of the Vanderbilt University appointed as E. Bronson Ingram Professor of Marketing. From 2008 to 2010 she was also Senior Associate Dean of the business school.

Iacobucci was editor of the Journal of Consumer Psychology from 1999 to 2002, editor of Journal of Consumer Research from 2002 to 2005, and Associate Editor for the Methodology, Journal of Consumer Psychology since 2005.

== Selected publications ==
- Iacobucci, Dawn, and Gilbert Churchill. Marketing research: methodological foundations. Cengage Learning, 2009.

Articles, a selection:

- Ostrom, Amy, and Dawn Iacobucci. "Consumer trade-offs and the evaluation of services." The Journal of Marketing (1995): 17–28.
- Bezjian-Avery, Alexa, Bobby Calder, and Dawn Iacobucci. "New media interactive advertising vs. traditional advertising." Journal of advertising research 38 (1998): 23–32.
- Wulf, Kristof De, Gaby Odekerken-Schröder, and Dawn Iacobucci. "Investments in consumer relationships: a cross-country and cross-industry exploration." Journal of marketing 65.4 (2001): 33–50.
