= Nolinor Aviation =

Charter airline of Canada

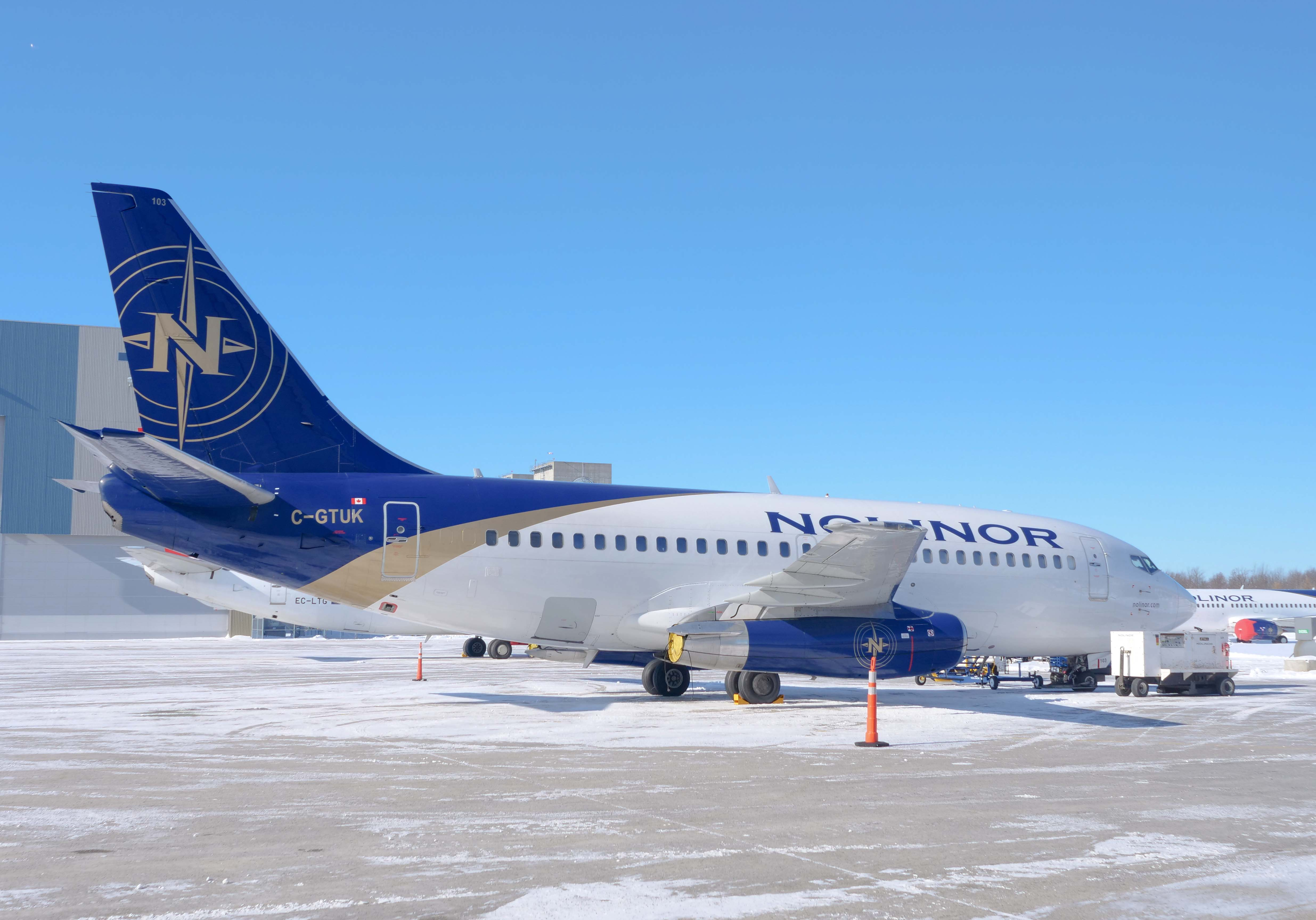
- A 200 series Boeing 737 in Montreal
IATA	ICAO	Call sign
N5	NRL	NOLINOR
- Founded: 1992; 34 years ago
- Commenced operations: 1997; 29 years ago
- AOC #: Canada: 10705; United States: NL1F800F
- Operating bases: Montréal–Mirabel International Airport
- Fleet size: 20 (TC), 13 (NRL)
- Headquarters: Mirabel, Quebec, Canada
- Website: www.nolinor.com/en

Les Investissements Nolinor Inc., trading as Nolinor Aviation, is a charter airline based in Mirabel, a suburb of Montreal, Quebec, Canada. It operates passenger charter and cargo services within Canada and to the United States. Its main base is Montréal–Mirabel International Airport.

As of 23 April 2026, it has 300 employees.

As of 22 April 2026, Nolinor's fleet consists of 20 aircraft, predominantly Boeing 737 variants. Nolinor Aviation is the world's largest operator of the Boeing 737-200 aircraft.

== History ==
The airline was established in 1992 and started operations in 1997. Since June 1999 it has also been authorized to provide its own aircraft maintenance.

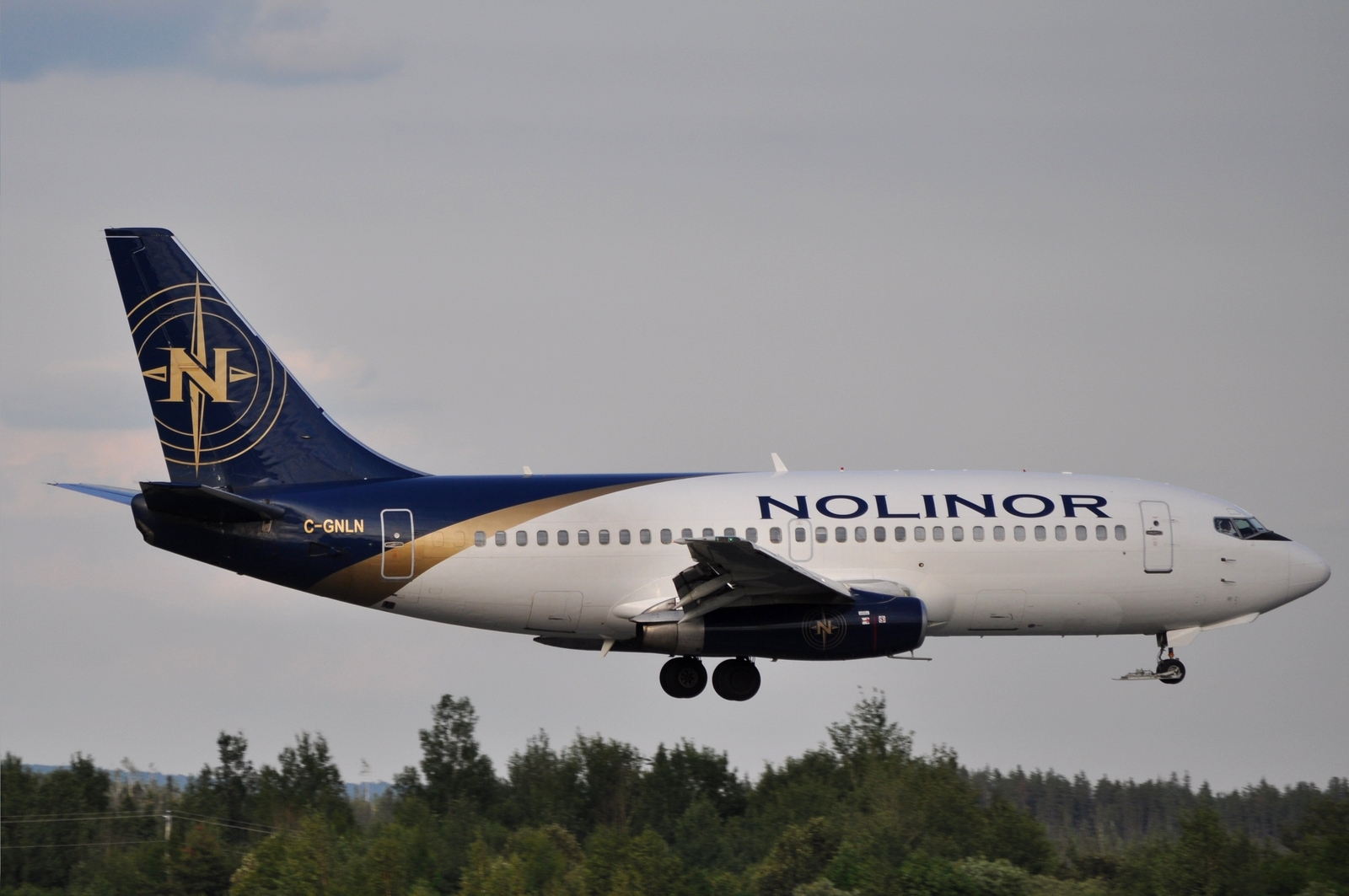
Nolinor Boeing 737-200

In 2001, the company bought its first fully cargo Convair 580 and started providing cargo service to the United States and the northern region of Canada. In order to respond to the growing cargo market, Nolinor Aviation bought two more full cargo Convair 580s in 2004. In 2006, the fourth passenger Convair 580 was purchased.

In 2004, the Prud'Homme family trust became the majority stockholder. Expanding very rapidly, Nolinor needed more space for its Convair 580 fleet; in 2005 the company moved its maintenance facilities to Mirabel International Airport. The new hangar provides more than 9,300 m^{2} (100,000 sq ft) and is able to accommodate aircraft like the Boeing 747-200, 777-300, and 767 as well as the Airbus A310 and A320. The pavement has more than 28,000 m^{2} (300,000 sq ft) and provides sufficient parking space for all the Nolinor Convair 580s and other maintenance clients.

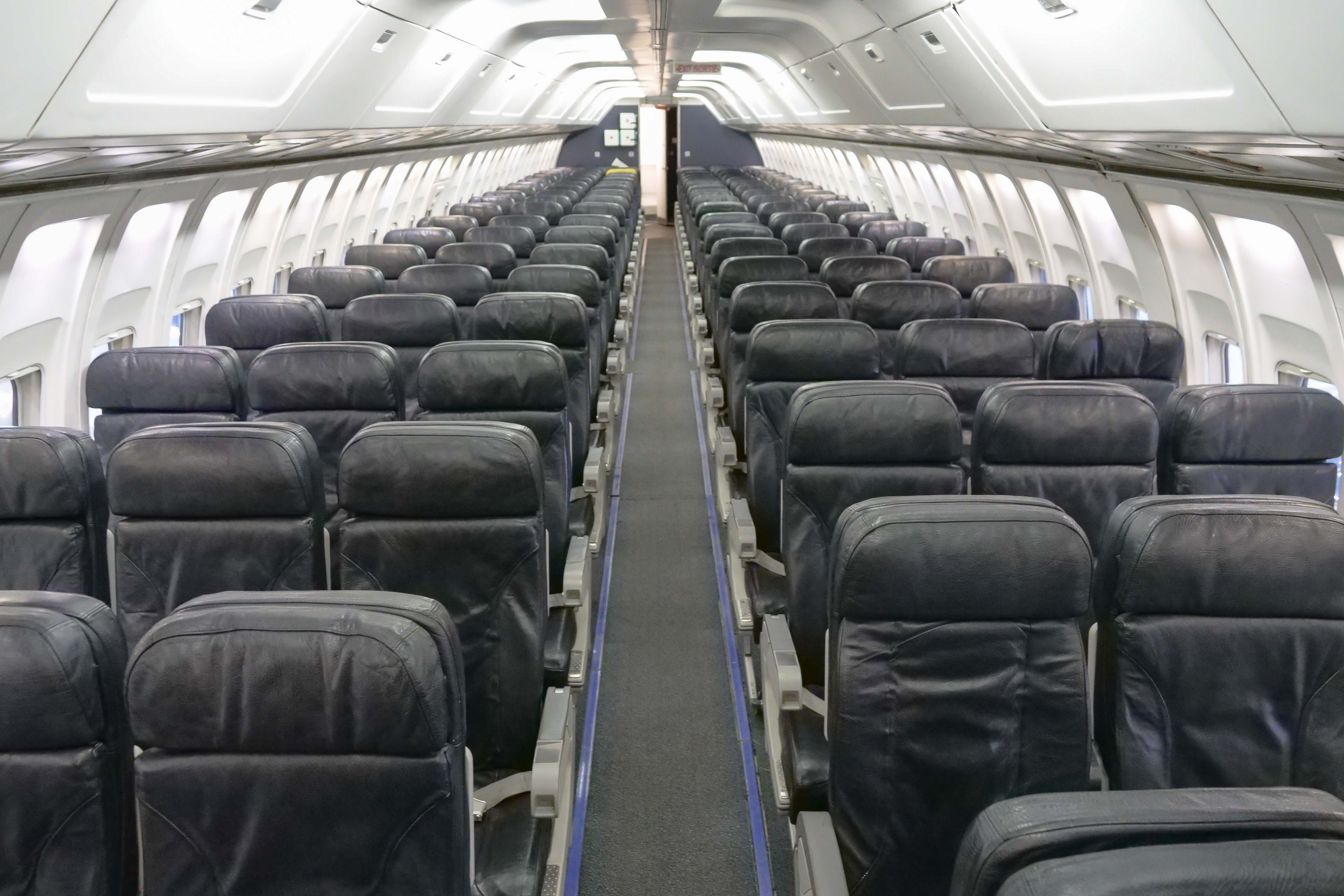
The cabin of a Nolinor 737-200

In 2006, the company was named one of the best enterprises in the province of Quebec by the National Bank of Canada. Nolinor is taking its share of the market outside the Quebec region.

In 2007, Nolinor Aviation acquired two ex-Royal Air Maroc Boeing 737-200 combi aircraft (freight/passenger).

In 2011, Nolinor acquired another 737-200 full freighter, for its cargo operations.

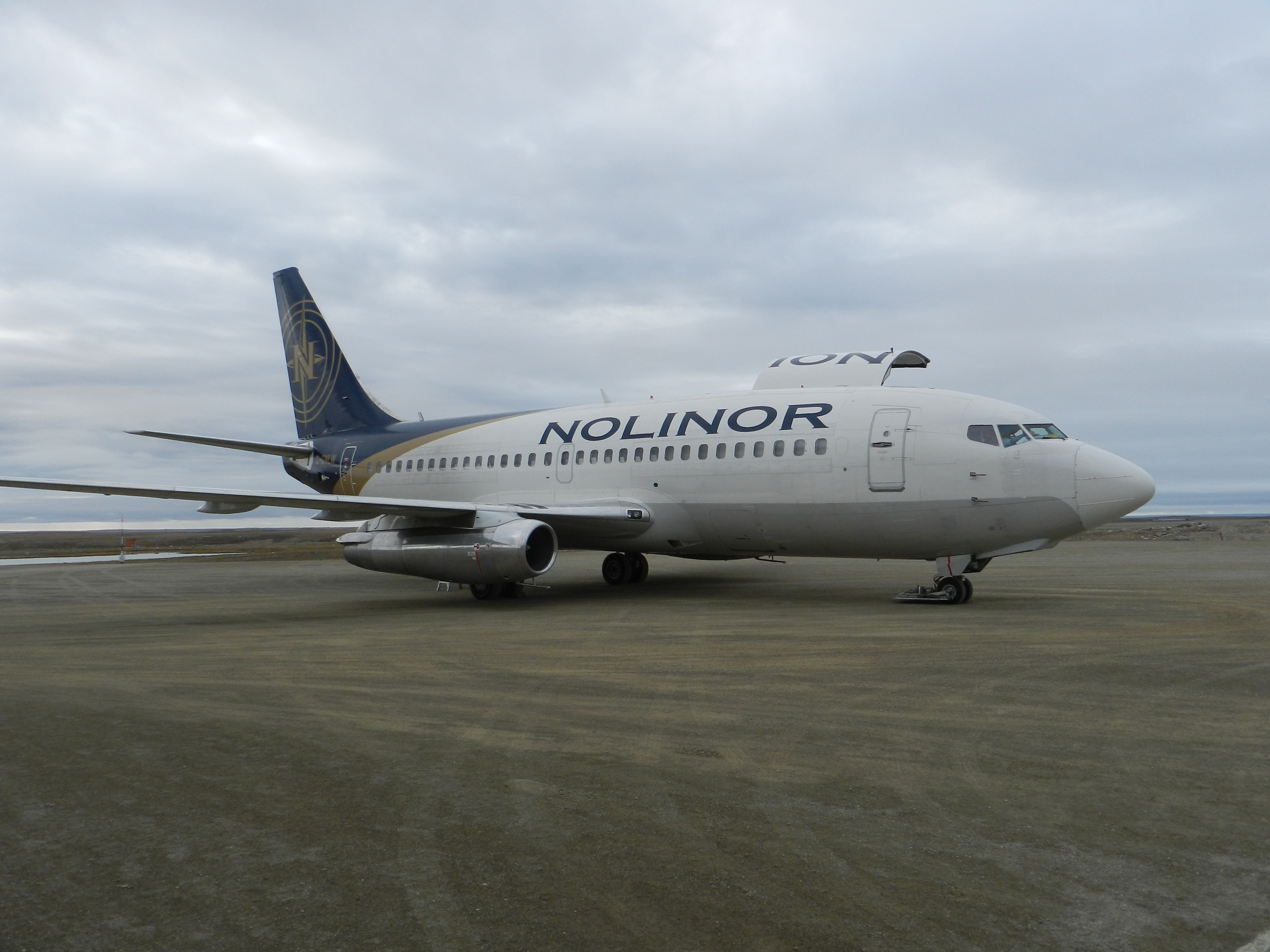
Nolinor charter (operating as First Air) at Cambridge Bay Airport

In 2013, Nolinor began charter service from the Region of Waterloo International Airport to Mary River Aerodrome via Iqaluit Airport using a Boeing 737-200 with three times weekly service and a fourth flight every other week. This service has since ended.

In 2014, Nolinor added a Learjet 31 corporate jet to its fleet.

In 2016, Nolinor Aviation added a 737-300 to its fleet.

In September 2017, Nolinor participated in the rescue of stranded passengers from Air France Flight 066, which made an emergency landing at Goose Bay Airport in Goose Bay, Newfoundland and Labrador, Canada, after experiencing an engine loss over the Atlantic Ocean. Passengers were ferried to their original destination at Los Angeles International Airport, with a stop at Winnipeg James Armstrong Richardson International Airport.

In 2020, the Montreal Alouettes and Nolinor Aviation planned to team up for the next ten years, as Nolinor remained the club's official charter flight partner. This new deal went even further than the previous one, as a Boeing 737 plane was personalized with the team's logo and colours.

Nolinor also launched OWG, a new airline, to offer a unique travel experience to tropical destinations. After just five years of service, OWG ceased operations on May 1, 2025.

As of 23 April 2026, Nolinor Aviation employed approximately 300 people and is the largest operator of Boeing 737-200 aircraft worldwide, with a fleet of ten.

== Operations ==
Nolinor's primary bases of operations include:

- Montréal–Mirabel International Airport (main base)
- Montréal–Trudeau International Airport (Montréal–Dorval International Airport)
- Winnipeg James Armstrong Richardson International Airport
- Region of Waterloo International Airport
- Val-d'Or Airport

== Livery ==
In 2003, the Netherlands-based airline branding firm Lila Design re-designed Nolinor's logo and aircraft paint design into a stylized white, blue and gold image.

== Fleet ==
As of 23 April 2026 Nolinor Aviation fleet includes the following aircraft

Nolinor fleet
Aircraft	TC number	NRL number	Variants	Notes
Aerospatiale AS350	1	-	AS350 B2	Helicopter, not listed at Nolinor web site
Boeing 737	10	10	737-200	All planes combi aircraft, 119 seats maximum, outfitted with gravel kits. Capable of carrying more than 14,000 kg (30,000 lb) of cargo. Aircraft C-GNLK has the distinction of being the oldest 737 and oldest jet airliner in commercial passenger operation today, having operated since delivery in 1974 (52 years).
Boeing 737 Classic	4	3	1 - 737-300, 3 - 737-400	The 300 can be configured for up to 130 seats. The 400 can be configured for 159 passengers maximum. Two 737-400s have been delivered in 2020, one is ex-Xtra Airways and the other is ex-AlbaStar. According to TC there are three 400 series and according to Nolinor there are two.
Cessna 172	2	-	172L	Training plane, not listed at Nolinor web site
Convair CV-340	1	-	CV-340	Not listed at Nolinor web site
Learjet 45	2	-	Lear 45	Nine passenger corporate jet for executive transport. Not listed at Nolinor web site
Total	20	13		
