= Sky Regional Airlines =

Canadian airline

IATA	ICAO	Call sign
KV	SKV	MAPLE
- Founded: 2010
- Ceased operations: March 31, 2021
- AOC #: Canada: 17536; United States: 6SYF337F
- Hubs: Montréal-Trudeau; Toronto-Pearson
- Frequent-flyer program: Aeroplan (Air Canada)
- Alliance: Star Alliance (affiliate)
- Fleet size: 25
- Destinations: 24
- Headquarters: Mississauga, Ontario
- Key people: Kent Woodside - President and COO
- Employees: approx. 700
- Website: skyregional.com

Sky Regional Airlines (SRA) was an airline whose corporate headquarters was located on the property of Toronto Pearson International Airport, Mississauga, Ontario, Canada. Linked with Skyservice Business Aviation, it began operation under the Air Canada Express brand on May 1, 2011. The airline began offering daily flights between Billy Bishop Toronto City Airport and Montréal–Pierre Elliott Trudeau International Airport.

== History ==
In 2010, Air Canada leased the Bombardier Q400s and began sub-leasing them to SRA. The aircraft had been operated by Lynx Aviation of Denver. They were delivered to Sky Regional between November 2010 and the beginning of 2011. The aircraft are configured with 74 seats, similar to the Porter Airlines fleet. The planes are painted in Air Canada Express livery. Russell Payson was founder and chairman of the board of SRA.

In October 2012, SRA added flights between Montreal and Moncton, New Brunswick. Since the early stages of operation the airline has been active in introducing new technology to its operation. Sky Regional was the first airline in Canada to adopt the Electronic Flight Bag (EFB). Each pilot at the company is issued an Apple iPad which is the platform for the EFB allowing crews to not only have quick access to flight plans and manuals but eliminate paper charts and numerous large manuals which previously would have been present on the flight deck.

Air Canada started to transfer its 15 Embraer E175 planes to SRA in April 2013 and completed the transfer in September 2013. In the fall of 2015 SRA added an additional 5 E175 aircraft to its fleet. These aircraft were previously operated by Azul Brazilian Airlines.

SRA introduced a fleet of Embraer E175 jets in March 2013 to serve US destinations such as New York, Newark, Boston, Philadelphia, Chicago, and Dallas/Fort Worth.

Between October and December 2015 the fleet of 20 was expanded to 25 after obtaining 5 additional Embraer E175s previously operated by Azul Brazilian Airlines. These aircraft were put into service in April 2016 allowing the airline to add routes to more US destination such as Denver International Airport, and Hartsfield-Jackson Atlanta International Airport.

In early 2017, SRA's fleet of 5 Bombardier Q400s were transferred to fellow Air Canada Express carrier Jazz Aviation with the last flight arriving into Montreal from Moncton on February 23. SRA received 5 additional E175s in early 2017. The first of the aircraft came into service on May 16 with the last going into service on July 1. These new aircraft features an extra 3 seats in business class for a total of 12 seats. The rest of the fleet were reconfigured by the end of 2017 to a 76-seat configuration.

In 2018, Brent Card was promoted to Vice-president Flight Operations.

On March 1, 2021, Air Canada announced that the airline was going to consolidate all regional flying under the Jazz banner thereby ending the affiliation between Sky Regional and Air Canada. The aircraft flown by Sky Regional, the Embraer E175, will be transferred to Jazz. On March 30, 2021, Sky Regional operated its last flight from Newark, NJ to Toronto.

== Destinations ==
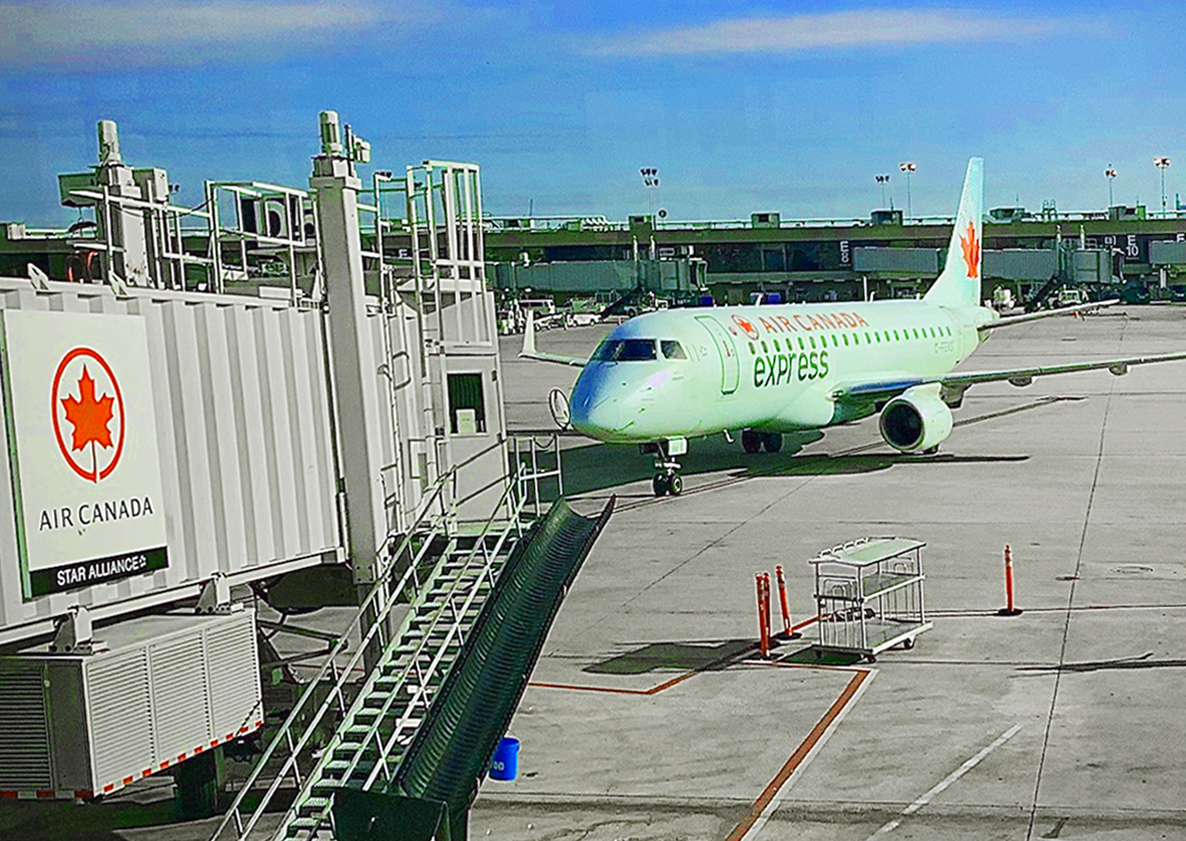
Sky Regional Embraer 175 operated for Air Canada Express

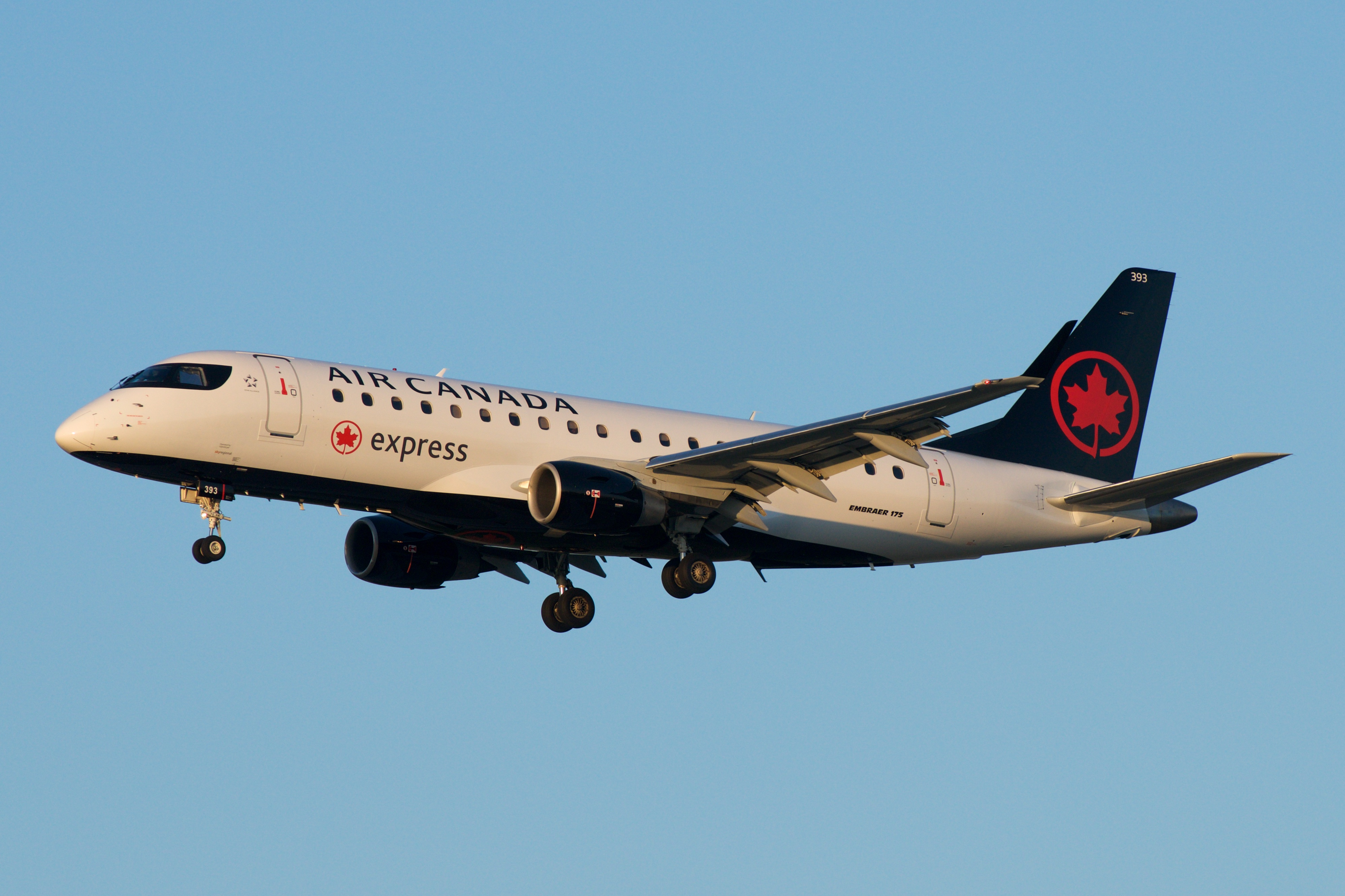
Sky Regional Airlines Embraer 175 operated for Air Canada Express

Prior to March 2021, SRA served the following destinations:

=== Canada ===
- Nova Scotia
  - Halifax (Halifax Stanfield International Airport)
- Newfoundland and Labrador
  - Deer Lake (Deer Lake Regional Airport)
- Ontario
  - Toronto (Toronto Pearson International Airport)
- Prince Edward Island
  - Charlottetown (Charlottetown Airport)
- Quebec
  - Montreal (Montréal–Trudeau International Airport)
  - Quebec City (Québec City Jean Lesage International Airport)

=== United States ===
- Georgia
  - Atlanta (Hartsfield–Jackson Atlanta International Airport)
- Illinois
  - Chicago (O'Hare International Airport)
- Louisiana
  - New Orleans (Louis Armstrong New Orleans International Airport)
- Maryland
  - Baltimore (Baltimore/Washington International Airport)
- Massachusetts
  - Boston (Logan International Airport)
- Minnesota
  - Minneapolis (Minneapolis–Saint Paul International Airport)
- New Jersey
  - Newark (Newark Liberty International Airport)
- New York
  - New York (LaGuardia Airport)
- Pennsylvania
  - Philadelphia (Philadelphia International Airport)
- Texas
  - Dallas/Fort Worth (Dallas/Fort Worth International Airport)
  - Houston (George Bush Intercontinental Airport)
  - San Antonio (San Antonio International Airport)
- Virginia (serving the District of Columbia)
  - Washington, D.C. area (Ronald Reagan Washington National Airport)

== Fleet ==
Prior to March 2021, the fleet of SRA consisted of the following aircraft:

Sky Regional Airlines fleet
Aircraft	In service	Passengers		
Aircraft	In service	J	Y	Total
Embraer E175	25	12	64	76
