= List of defunct Canadian companies =

This is a list of defunct Canadian companies.

== Defunct companies (including acquired and merged) ==
Note: many of these companies are still operating under the same name; they are just owned by others.

- Abitibi Power and Paper Company – part of Abitibi-Consolidated, now part of Resolute Forest Products
- Agricore – merged with United Grain Growers Ltd. to form Agricore United
- Aikenhead's Hardware – hardware store, acquired by Home Depot
- AMC Theatres Canada – some locations acquired by Cineplex Entertainment, others closed
- Bricklin Automobile
- Bytown and Prescott Railway – acquired by Canadian Pacific Railway
- Canada Wire and Cable – manufacturer, acquired by Alcatel
- Carling O'Keefe – brewery, acquired by Molson
- Chapters – acquired by Indigo Books and Music
- China Wind Power – dissolved
- Cineplex Odeon – acquired by Loews Theatres
- Consumers Distributing – catalogue retail store chain
- CTV (Canadian Television) – acquired by Bell Globemedia; formerly Baton Broadcasting, et al
- Diemaco – firearm and defense company; acquired by Colt's Manufacturing Company
- Dow Breweries
- Dylex – acquired by Hardof Wolf Group
- E. B. Eddy Company – acquired by Domtar
- Eaton's – Department store chain – bankrupt in 1999
- Future Shop – acquired by Best Buy
- Honest Ed's – a discount retail store
- Jetsgo
- Job Brothers & Co., Limited
- John Inglis and Company – kitchen appliance maker
- McLaughlin Motor Car Co. – merged with General Motors
- Noranda – merged with Falconbridge
- Nova Scotia Light and Power Company, Limited – acquired by the Province of Nova Scotia; assets leased to * Nova Scotia Power Corporation
- Ontario Malleable Iron Company – iron foundry
- PetroKazakhstan – acquired by China National Petroleum Corporation
- Polymer Corporation – sold to NOVA Corp and then Bayer AG
- Radio Shack (Canadian division) – electronics store
- Seagram – spirits and wine
- Target Canada – closed because of a $2.1 billion loss for Target Corporation
- Terra Transport
- Towers Department Stores – department store chain; acquired by Zellers
- Union Bank of Halifax – now part of the Royal Bank of Canada
- United Grain Growers Ltd. – merged with Agricore to form Agricore United
- Vidéotron – cable; now owned by Quebecor
- Woodward's – acquired by Hudson's Bay Company
- Woolco (Canadian division) – department store chain; acquired by Wal-Mart Canada
- Zellers (Canadian division) – department store chain; acquired by now defunct chain Target Canada

=== Aerospace ===
- Avro Canada – airplane manufacturer, maker of the Avro Arrow and the Avro Aerocar.
- Canadair – acquired by Bombardier
- de Havilland Canada – acquired by Boeing and a few years later acquired by Bombardier
- Spar Aerospace – split up and acquired by MacDonald Dettwiler, L-3 Communications and Bombardier

=== Airlines ===
- Air Atlantic
- Air BC – merged with Air Canada Jazz
- Air Ontario – merged with Air Canada Jazz
- AllCanada Express
- Austin Airways – acquired by Air Ontario
- Canada 3000 – folded, discount airline
- Canadian Airlines – acquired by Air Canada
- Canadian Pacific Airlines – acquired by Canadian Airlines
- Canadian Regional Airlines – merged with Air Canada Jazz
- Eastern Provincial Airways – acquired by Canadian Pacific Airlines
- Globemaster Air Cargo
- Great Lakes Airlines (Canada) – acquired by Air Ontario
- Greyhound Air
- Harmony Airways
- Inter-Canadien
- Jetsgo
- Lamb Air
- Lynx Air
- Maestro
- Nationair
- Nolisair
- NorOntair
- North Canada Air – acquired by Time Air
- Pacific Western Airlines
- Peace Air
- Quebecair Express
- Queen Charlotte Airlines – acquired by Pacific Western Airlines
- QuikAir
- Roots Air
- Royal Aviation – acquired by Canada 3000
- Sonicblue Airways
- Southern Frontier Airlines – acquired by Time Air
- Time Air – acquired by Air Canada Jazz
- Trans-Provincial Airlines – acquired by Harbour Air
- Triton Airlines
- Val Air
- Vision Airways Corporation
- Vistajet
- WardAir – acquired by Canadian Airlines
- Winnport
- World-Wide Airways
- Zip – merged with Air Canada
- Zoom Airlines

=== Banking, finance and insurance ===
- Bank of America Canada – subsidiary of the United States-based bank chain Bank of America
- Bank of British Columbia (1862) – acquired by Canadian Commercial Bank
- Bank of British Columbia (1978) – acquired by HSBC Bank Canada
- Bank of British North America – acquired by Bank of Montreal
- Bank of Hamilton – acquired by Canadian Imperial Bank of Commerce
- Bank of New Brunswick – acquired by Bank of Nova Scotia
- Bank of Upper Canada
- Canada Trust – acquired by Toronto-Dominion Bank
- Canadian Commercial Bank
- City Bank
- Consolidated Bank of Canada
- Continental Bank of Canada – acquired by Lloyds Bank of Canada
- Home Bank of Canada – failed in 1923
- Lloyds Bank of Canada – acquired by HSBC Bank Canada
- Maritime Life – acquired by Manulife Financial
- Royal Trust – acquired by Royal Bank of Canada

=== Biotech, medical ===
- DVS Sciences – acquired by Fluidigm (2014) and changed their name to Standard BioTools (2022)
- Precision Nanosystems Inc. - acquired by Danaher Corporation (2021), then merged with Cytiva (2023-2024)
- Kinetek Pharmaceuticals Inc. - acquired by QLT in 2004 for 2.7 M

=== Computer hardware and software ===
- AliasWavefront – developers of industry leading Maya 3D software; in 2006 it was bought out by Autodesk Inc.
- ATI Technologies – bought out by AMD
- Ferranti-Packard – early mainframe systems
- HCR Corporation – early Unix company, acquired by Santa Cruz Operation, later closed
- I. P. Sharp Associates – time share company
- Imanet – international trade software
- Sitebrand – online marketing company
- Watcom International Corporation – acquired by Sybase

=== Consumer retail, including grocery ===
- Aeropostale Canada – subsidiary of the United States-based retailer Aeropostale, closed all 41 stores in Canada in 2016
- A&A Records – founded in Toronto at the end of WWII, it was the dominant record chain store in Canada until being superseded by Sam the Record Man in the 1960s; it became defunct in 1993
- A&B Sound – home electronics retailer based in Richmond, BC; founded in 1959, it had expanded as far as Winnipeg, Manitoba by 2000, but its subsequent decline saw the company go bankrupt by 2008
- Bata Shoes – shoe retailer and manufacturer
- Beaver Lumber – hardware/lumber store chain; acquired by Home Hardware
- Big Lots Canada
- Dominion – grocery store chain
- Bi-Way – discount store chain
- Eaton's – bankrupt, assets acquired by Sears Canada
- Express – subsidiary of the United States-based clothing retailer Express, closed all 17 stores in Canada in 2017
- Food City – grocery store chain
- Granada TV Rental- electronic consumer goods retail rental outlets
- Hard Rock Cafe -all Canadian Cafe locations closed by 2017 but Hard Rock Casino still exist in Coquitlam, BC, Vancouver, BC, and a new location is set to open in Ottawa in 2021 Hard Rock Cafe still has a location in Niagara Falls, Ontario in Canada.
- HMV Canada – entertainment media chain owned by Hilco; originally a subsidiary of England-based retailer HMV; closed all stores in April 2017, the majority of locations became Sunrise Records
- Kmart Canada – subsidiary of US chain, some assets acquired by Zellers
- Knob Hill Farms – grocery store chain
- Kresge (Canadian division) – discount store chain
- Lumberland Building Materials (BC-based store founded in Surrey; it merged with Revy Home Centres in 1997, which then was acquired by Rona in 2001)
- LW Stores – discount store chain; acquired by Big Lots in 2010 and closed all stores in 2014
- Marks & Spencer – major British retailer; had operated in Canada since 1973; closed all Canadian operations by 1999
- Miracle Mart – discount store owned by the Steinberg family
- Miracle Food Mart – grocery store chain
- Morgan's – department store chain
- Pascal – bankrupt in 1991 (Hardware Stores) – 1994 (furniture stores) – 2008 (Pascal Hotel Supplies)
- RadioShack Canada – renamed The Source by Circuit City in 2005
- Revelstoke Home Centres Ltd. (aka Revy's or Revy Home Centres; owned by the West Fraser Timber Company, this was a major home improvement retailer headquartered in Revelstoke, BC; merged with Rona in 2001)
- Sam The Record Man – record/entertainment media stores
- Sam's Club Canada – warehouse store chain and the subsidiary of Walmart Canada; closed in 2009
- Sears Canada – department store chain and the Canadian subsidiary of the American-based Sears, all stores closed in January 2018
- Shoprite Catalogue order store, went bankrupt in 1970s.
- Simpsons – department store chain (AKA Simpson's Sears and Sears Roebuck)
- Steinberg's – grocery store chain
- Target Canada – Canadian subsidiary of the American-based department store chain Target Corporation, closed all stores in 2015
- Thrifty's – denim/clothing store
- Towers – department store chain
- Toy City – a toy store chain, a subsidiary of Consumers Distributing
- Woodward's – department store chain
- Woolco – discount department store, acquired by Wal-Mart providing an expansion route into the Canadian market
- Zellers – discount department store; store properties bought by Target Corporation and most converted into Target Canada stores

=== Food and beverage ===
- Mitchell's Gourmet Foods – acquired by Maple Leaf Foods
- Mother's Pizza

=== Mining and energy ===
- Bre-X – gold mining company, collapsed in fraud
- Dominion Steel and Coal Corporation
- Eldorado Resources – uranium mining, merged with Saskatchewan Mining Development Corporation to form Cameco (1988)
- Gulf Canada Resources – acquired by Conoco
- Lightstream Resources Ltd. – oil and gas (dissolved under corporate legislation)
- Noranda – mining, merged with Falconbridge Ltd. (2005)
- Saskatchewan Mining Development Corporation (SMDC) – uranium mining, merged with Eldorado Mining and Refining Limited to form Cameco (1988)
- Teck Cominco – mining
- Westcoast Energy – acquired by Duke Energy
- West Kootenay Power & Light – acquired by Fortis Inc

=== Railways, commuter rail and steamship companies ===
==== A-B ====
- Algoma Central and Hudson Bay Railway
- Algoma Central Railway – acquired by Canadian National Railways (CN)
- BC Rail – now part of CN
- Belt Line Railway – acquired by CN

==== C-E ====
- Canada Atlantic Railway
- Canada Eastern Railway
- Canada Southern Railway
- Canadian Government Railways
- Canadian Northern Pacific Railway
- Canadian Northern Railway
- Champlain and St. Lawrence Railroad
- Columbia and Kootenay Railway
- Devco Railway
- Dominion Atlantic Railway

==== E-G ====
- European and North American Railway
- Esquimalt and Nanaimo Railway -acquired by Canadian Pacific Railway
- Grand River Railway – acquired by Canadian Pacific
- Grand Trunk Pacific Railway – acquired by CN
- Great Western Railway

==== H-K ====
- Halifax and Southwestern Railway
- Huntsville and Lake of Bays Transportation Company – steamship and railway
- Intercolonial Railway of Canada
- International Railway
- Kaslo and Slocan Railway
- Kettle Valley Railway

==== M-N ====
- Metropolitan Street Railway of Toronto
- Midland Railway of Canada
- Nakusp and Slocan Railway
- National Transcontinental Railway
- Nelson and Fort Sheppard Railway
- New Brunswick Railway
- Newfoundland Railway
- Northern Alberta Railways
- Northern Railway of Canada
- Nosbonsing and Nipissing Railway
- Nova Scotia Railway

==== O-P ====
- Ontario and Quebec Railway
- Ottawa, Arnprior & Parry Sound Railway
- Parry Sound Colonization Railway
- Port Arthur, Duluth and Western Railway
- Prince Edward Island Railway

==== S-T ====
- Sydney and Louisburg Railway
- Toronto, Hamilton and Buffalo Railway
- Toronto and Mimico Electric Railway and Light Company
- Toronto and Scarboro' Electric Railway, Light and Power Company
- Toronto and York Radial Railway
- Toronto Suburban Railway

=== Telecommunications companies ===
- Nortel – established in 1895; in 2000 accounted for more than a third of the total valuation of all the companies listed on the Toronto Stock Exchange (TSX)

== See also ==
- List of defunct hotels in Canada
