= List of airlines of Ontario =

This is a list of airlines that are based in Ontario which have an air operator's certificate issued by Transport Canada, the country's civil aviation authority.

== Current airlines ==
Airline	Image	IATA	ICAO	Callsign	Hub airport(s) or headquarters	Notes
Adler Aviation			SWH	SHOCKWAVE	Waterloo	Charters, cargo, flight training
AirExpress Ontario					Ottawa Macdonald–Cartier, Chatham-Kent, Oshawa Municipal	Charters
Bearskin Airlines			BLS	BEARSKIN	Sioux Lookout, Thunder Bay	Regional, scheduled passenger service, charters
Brock Air Services			BRD	BROCK AIR	Kingston/Norman Rogers	Charters and MEDIVAC (air ambulance)
Cargojet		W8	CJT	CARGOJET	John C. Munro Hamilton	Cargo
First Air		7F	FAB	FIRST AIR	Yellowknife, Iqaluit	Scheduled passenger service, cargo, charters
Flightexec			FEX		Buttonville, London	Charter airline, MEDIVAC (air ambulance)
Helicopter Transport Services					Carp	Charters, MEDIVAC (air ambulance), aerial firefighting
Nakina Air Service		T2			Nakina	Floatplane charters
Ornge					Thunder Bay, Sioux Lookout, Timmins/Victor M. Power	Air ambulance
Porter Airlines		PD	POE	PORTER AIR	Billy Bishop Toronto	Regional airline
Silverline Helicopters					Holland Landing	
SkyLink Aviation			SKK	SKYLINK	Toronto Pearson	Charters, cargo
SkyLink Express			SLQ	SKYLINK	Toronto Pearson	Charters, cargo
Stanton Airways					Orillia/Lake St John	Floatplanes, charters and fly-in fishing camps
Superior Airways					Red Lake	Charters
Thunder Airlines			THU	AIR THUNDER	Thunder Bay	Scheduled passenger service, charters
Voyageur Airways		VC	VAL	VOYAGEUR	North Bay/Jack Garland	Charters, MEDIVAC (air ambulance)
Wasaya Airways			WSG	WASAYA	Thunder Bay	Scheduled passenger service, charters
White River Air			WRA		White River	Fly-in outposts
Wilderness Air					Vermilion Bay	Floatplanes, fly-in fishing camps

== Defunct airlines ==
Airline	Image	IATA	ICAO	Callsign	Hub airport(s) or headquarters	Notes
30000 Island Air					Parry Sound Harbour	2000? - ?, charter rental and leasing service air operator based in Parry Sound, Ontario using de Havilland Canada DHC-2 Beaver
Air Ontario		GX	ONT	ONTARIO	London	1987 - 2001, to Air Canada Jazz
Air Toronto		CS	CNE	CONNECTOR	Toronto Pearson	1984 - 1991
AllCanada Express			CNX	CANEX	Toronto Pearson	1992 - 2005
Austin Airways		AAW			Timmins/Victor M. Power	1934 - 1987, to Air Ontario
Canada 3000		2T	CMM	ELITE	Toronto Pearson	1988 - 2001, formerly Canada 2000; Canada 3000 Cargo sold to Cargojet and 2005 revival failed
City Express					Peterborough	1971 - 1991, founded as Air Atonabee 1971
Great Lakes Airlines					Sarnia Chris Hadfield	1958 - 1983, to Air Ontario
Intair		ND	INT	INTAIR	Toronto Pearson	1989 - 1991, established by City Express as a successor to Skycraft Air Transport
Millardair					Toronto Pearson	1962 - 1990, continued as aircraft maintenance and servicing firm Millard Air Incorporated (Millardair MRO) 1990–2012
NAC Air			HMR	HAMMER	Thunder Bay	2000 - 2008, North American Charters was 100% First Nations owned
NorOntair			NOA	NORONTAIR	Sault Ste. Marie	1971 - 1996, airline operations of Ontario Northland Transportation Commission
Odyssey International		OL	ODY	ODYSSEY	Toronto Pearson	1988 - 1990, name, aircraft and some employees were merged with Nationair, and operated as a separate division of Nolisair for a short period of time
Ontario Central Airlines			NUN	NUNASI	Kenora	1947 - 1991?, became Nunasi-Central Airlines in 1984 and then to Nunasi-Northland Airlines in 1987
Ontario Express		9X	OEL	PARTNER		1980s - 1998, to Canadian Airlines
Pem-Air		PD	OEM	PEM-AIR	Pembroke	1970 - 2002
Roots Air		6J	SSV	SKYTOUR	Toronto Pearson	2000 - 2001, part of Roots Canada, ceased operations when ownership acquired by Air Canada
Skycraft Air Transport					Oshawa	1977 - 1989, reincarnated in 1989 and operating until 1994.
Skyservice Airlines		5G	SSV	SKYTOUR	Toronto Pearson	1986 - 2010, differs from existing Skyservice Business Aviation - same owners
Soundair			SDR	SOUNDAIR	Toronto Pearson	1973-1990, owned Odyssey International and Air Toronto. Previously Owen Sound Air Services. DBA Soundair Express.
Starratt Airways					Hudson, Kenora District	1932 - 1942, to Canadian Pacific Airlines
Vacationair					Toronto	1988 - 1990, initiated by Gray Coach Lines
Vision Airways Corporation		V6	VSN	VISION	Timmins/Victor M. Power	? - 1994
Vistajet			VJT	VISTA	Ottawa, Toronto, Windsor	1997 - 1997
Zoom Airlines		Z4	OOM	ZOOM	Ottawa Macdonald–Cartier	2002 - 2008, named acquired for new XPO Airlines 2009
