= Alliance Air =

Alliance Air may refer to:

- Alliance Air (India), a regional airline in India
- Alliance Air (Uganda), a defunct multinational airline
- Alliance Airlines, based in Brisbane, Queensland

== See also ==
- Air Alliance, a Canadian airline which was operational from 1988 to 1999
- Airline alliance, a cooperative arrangement between two or more airlines
