= Charlottetown Airport =

Airport in Prince Edward Island, Canada

Charlottetown Alexander B. Campbell Airport

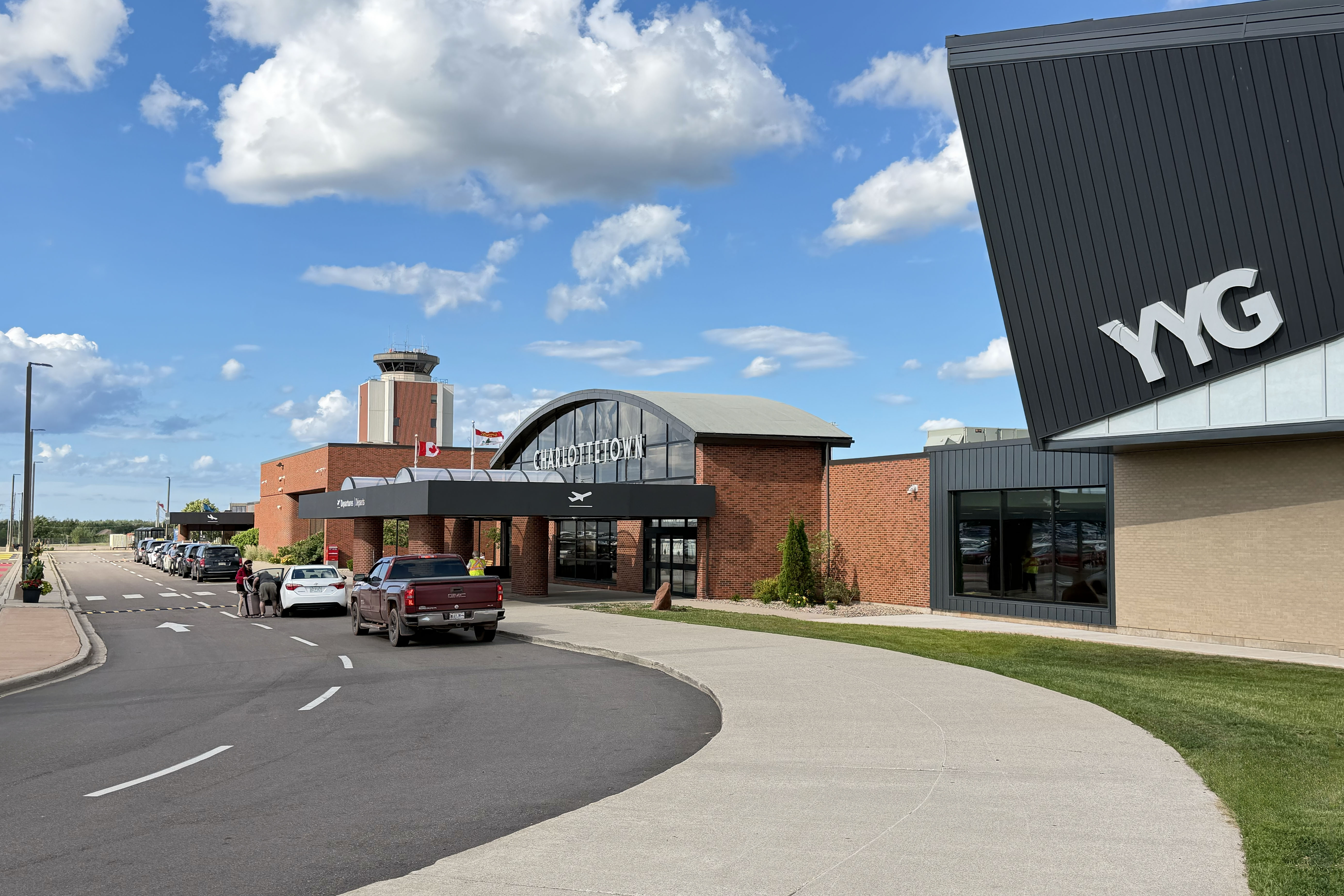
- Terminal Exterior
- IATA: YYG; ICAO: CYYG; WMO: 71706

Summary
- Airport type: Public
- Owner: Transport Canada
- Operator: Charlottetown Airport Authority
- Serves: Charlottetown, Prince Edward Island
- Location: Sherwood, Prince Edward Island
- Time zone: AST (UTC−04:00)
  - Summer (DST): ADT (UTC−03:00)
- Elevation AMSL: 167 ft (51 m)
- Coordinates: 46°17′24″N 063°07′16″W
- Website: flyyyg.com

Map
- Location on Prince Edward Island

Runways
Direction	Length		Surface
Direction	ft	m	Surface
03/21	7,002	2,134	Asphalt
10/28	7,000	2,134	Asphalt

Statistics (2025)
- Number of passengers: 391,086
- Sources: Canada Flight Supplement; Environment and Climate Change Canada; Movements from Statistics Canada

Charlottetown Alexander B. Campbell Airport (IATA: YYG, ICAO: CYYG) is located 3 nautical miles (5.6 km; 3.5 mi) north of Charlottetown, Prince Edward Island, Canada. The airport is currently run by the Charlottetown Airport Authority, is owned by Transport Canada and forms part of the National Airports System.

The airport is classified as an airport of entry by Nav Canada and is staffed by the Canada Border Services Agency. CBSA officers at this airport can handle aircraft with no more than 60 passengers or 368 if off-loaded in stages. They can also unload general aviation aircraft with no more that 15 people on board at the marine terminal.

== History ==
=== Upton Field ===
The first aircraft to operate in the Charlottetown area was one that landed at the exhibition grounds east of the city's central business district in 1912; it was not until 1931 that a permanent airfield was built. The first facility was known as Upton Field (later Upton Airport) and consisted of two turf runways 2,800 ft (850 m) and 1,600 ft (490 m) respectively, opening on January 16, 1932. Upton was a farm located in the western part of Queens Royalty, northwest of the city proper. The airfield was leased to Canadian Airways from October 9, 1932, to October 9, 1938, although the airfield was only licensed until June 30, 1938. Throughout this time, Upton Airport received the first air mail service in Canada.

Today the site is farmland and trees, and a popular area for walking dogs, hiking, cross country skiing, and other recreational activities.

=== Municipal ownership and operation ===
In June 1938, the city government asked the Department of Transport to assist in the development of an expanded municipal airport. Upton Airport was considered a candidate, as was a 300-acre (1.2 km^{2}) property east of Sherwood Station on the Brackley Point Road. Upton Airport was rejected due to lack of space, and the Sherwood Station property in the central part of Charlottetown Royalty was purchased by the city government for $30,000. The provincial government contributed 50% to the development of the new airport in exchange for 50% of its profits while the city would operate it.

=== Military operation ===
In December 1939, the city government offered the airport to the federal government for military use through the duration of World War II. The Royal Canadian Air Force expanded the airport and enlarged the runways in preparation for using the airport to train pilots and aircrew. The runways were altered into a classic triangle configuration seen with most British Commonwealth Air Training Plan aerodromes across Canada. The Royal Air Force used the airfield from June 15, 1941, until February 1944 during which time it was known as RCAF Station Charlottetown. Following the departure of the RAF, the RCAF established training units at the airfield, which was renamed RCAF Station Charlottetown.

=== Federal ownership and operation ===
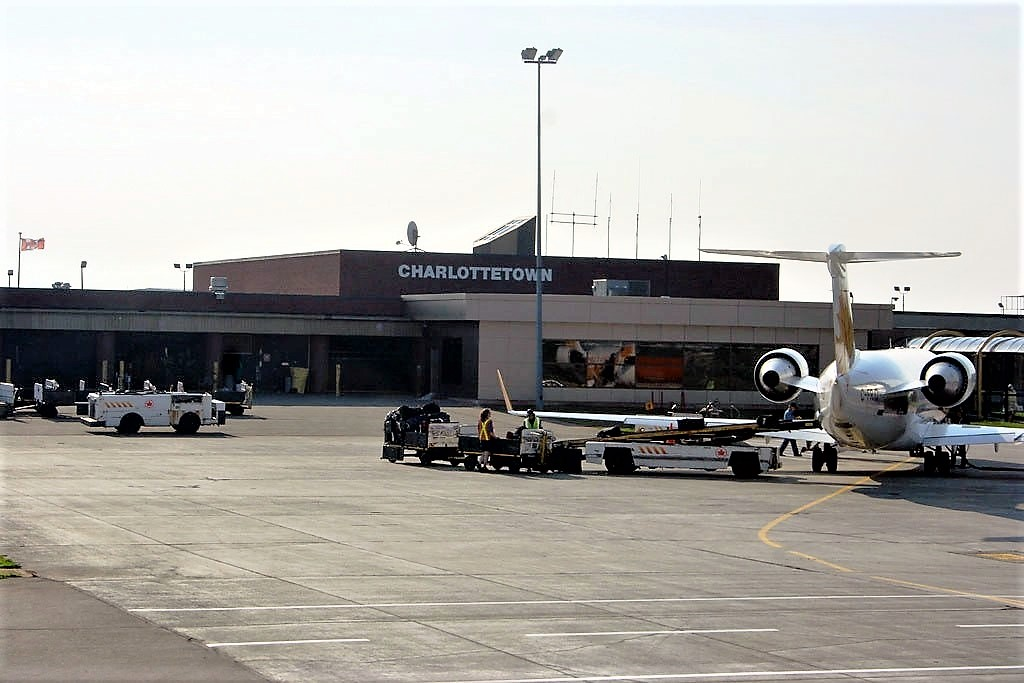
Air Canada Express in Charlottetown

Following the end of World War II, the military presence at the airport diminished by late 1945 and the base was decommissioned and transferred from the RCAF to the federal Department of Transport on February 1, 1946, returning the airfield to civilian use.

Several expansions were subsequently undertaken, including an enlarged civilian air terminal off the Brackley Point Road on the west side of the airfield, as well as a lengthening and realigning of what would become runway 03/21 during the 1960s-1970s to accommodate jet aircraft. A major expansion during the 1980s saw the old terminal become a general aviation facility after a new terminal, control tower and emergency services building were constructed further to the north from a continuation of Sherwood Road. This also saw runway 03/21 lengthened to its current configuration.

Charlottetown Airport saw extensive service during the 1960s-1990s from both Air Canada and Eastern Provincial Airways (EPA) to destinations in Atlantic and Central Canada. Following EPA's sale and merger with CP Air, Charlottetown Airport saw direct CP Air service from Central Canada for several years, continued by Canadian Airlines. The creation of Air Canada subsidiary Air Nova and Canadian subsidiary Air Atlantic saw the beginning of a downgrade in direct service by the major carriers from Central Canada and an increase in service from hub airports such as Halifax and Moncton.

The opening of the Confederation Bridge in 1997 coupled with capacity improvements at Moncton and Halifax airports saw many changes to air traffic through Charlottetown.

=== Charlottetown Airport Authority ===
On February 28, 1999, Transport Canada transferred operational and financial responsibility for the Charlottetown Airport to the Charlottetown Airport Authority under a 60-year lease arrangement, while the federal government remains the owner of the property.

=== 2000s-present: Airport renovation and expansion; airport renaming ===
Passenger traffic by year
Year	Passengers	% Change	Source
1999	187,277	▲5.3%	
2000	166,849	▼11.0%	
2001	176,869	▲6.0%	
2002	158,746	▼10.2%	
2003	163,488	▲3.0%	
2004	168,997	▲3.4%	
2005	189,547	▲12.2%	
2006	224,840	▲18.6%	
2007	253,224	▲12.3%	
2008	282,385	▲11.5%	
2009	278,573	▼1.3%	
2010	289,597	▲4.0%	
2011	285,158	▼1.5%	
2012	297,329	▲4.3%	
2013	296,301	▼0.3%	
2014	317,827	▲7.3%	
2015	316,628	▼0.3%	
2016	354,234	▲12%	
2017	370,688	▲4.6%	
2018	370,730	▲0.1%	
2019	383,183	▲3.4%	
2020	71,480	▼81.3%	
2021	111,160	▲55.5%	
2022	341,649	▲207.3%	
2023	402,686	▲17.9%	
2024	410,773	▲2.0%	
2025	391,086	▼4.8%	

Since the turn of the millennium, and especially since the mid-2000s, Charlottetown Airport has seen a considerable increase in the number of flights. The trend started when Air Canada introduced non-stop flights to Montréal–Trudeau International Airport from Charlottetown after the acquisition of Canadian Airlines. In early 2003, Jetsgo introduced non-stop flights from Charlottetown. The flights didn't last long, as Jetsgo declared bankruptcy and shut down in March 2005.

In 2016 and 2017, the airport underwent major renovations to expand the size of the main terminal apron as well as a major expansion to runway 10/28 to have two 7,000 ft (2,100 m) runways. Runway 10/28 reopened in late summer 2017. The renovations also included remodelling and added amenities within the terminal building, including a Canada Border Services Agency (CBSA) customs office.

During the COVID-19 pandemic, the airport saw greatly diminished air carrier capacity. Only Air Canada Cargo was left operating at the airport in March and April 2020. Limited passenger service returned with Air Canada in May 2020, and continued on its own until late 2021. In late 2021, Flair Airlines announced they would be operating a flight between Toronto and Charlottetown. Then, in May 2022, Swoop Airlines commenced operations between Toronto and Charlottetown, flying three times a week. In the summer of 2021, WestJet began to operate a direct flight between Charlottetown and Calgary. Porter Airlines began operating daily flights to Ottawa from Charlottetown in May 2023. In June 2023, WestJet started operating a direct flight between Charlottetown and Edmonton.

Airport traffic returned to near pre-pandemic levels in 2022, breaking the airport's passenger count records for October and November.

In 2022, the airport began a $20 million expansion to the main terminal building, planning to expand passenger seating as well as to create an outdoor seating area.

In May 2026, the airport was renamed the "Charlottetown Alexander B. Campbell Airport", after Alex Campbell, who served as the Premier of Prince Edward Island from 1966 to 1978.

== Airlines and destinations ==
=== Passenger ===
Airlines	Destinations
Air Canada	Seasonal: Montréal–Trudeau
Air Canada Express	Seasonal: Montréal–Trudeau
Air Canada Rouge	Toronto–Pearson
Air Transat	Seasonal: Cancún, Punta Cana (begins December 16, 2026)
Flair Airlines	Seasonal: Toronto–Pearson
Porter Airlines	Ottawa; Seasonal: Hamilton (ON) (begins June 19, 2027), Toronto–Pearson
WestJet	Seasonal: Calgary, Edmonton

=== Historical passenger airline service: 1960s-2000s ===
Eastern Provincial Airways served the airport during the 1960s with Douglas DC-3 prop aircraft and Handley Page Dart Herald turboprop aircraft. By 1970, Eastern Provincial had introduced jet service with Boeing 737 aircraft and was operating non-stop 737-200 series flights to Halifax and Montreal as well as direct, no change of plane 737 service to Sydney, Nova Scotia, Deer Lake, Newfoundland and Labrador, Gander, Newfoundland and Labrador and St. John's, Newfoundland and Labrador.

In 1975, Eastern Provincial Airlines was the only airline operating scheduled flights into the airport with non-stop Boeing 737-200 jet service from Halifax and Montreal as well as non-stop Handley Page Dart Herald turboprop service from Halifax, the Magdalen Islands and Moncton.

According to the OAG, a second airline was serving the airport by early 1976: Air Canada operating non-stop McDonnell Douglas DC-9 jet service from Ottawa with these flights also providing one stop direct, no change of plane service from Toronto.

This same OAG also lists Eastern Provincial's flights with Boeing 737-200 jet service being operated on the same routes with the airline also having replaced its Handley Page Dart Herald aircraft with Hawker Siddeley HS 748 turboprops by this time.

Air Canada and Eastern Provincial were continuing to serve the airport during the early 1980s with Air Canada operating one daily nonstop to Ottawa with a McDonnell Douglas DC-9-30 with this flight continuing on to Toronto while Eastern Provincial was operating one daily nonstop flight to Montreal with a Boeing 737-200. However, by early 1985, Eastern Provincial, while continuing to serve the airport, was no longer operating nonstop flights to Montreal from Charlottetown. Eastern Provincial then merged with CP Air in 1986 to form Canadian Pacific Air Lines and successor Canadian Airlines was continuing to operate Boeing 737-200 jet service from the airport during the late 1980s.

In the late summer of 1994, three airlines were serving Charlottetown: Air Canada with one daily mainline DC-9-30 jet flight from Toronto which made an en route stop at Moncton, Air Nova operating code sharing service for Air Canada with six non-stop flights from Halifax operated every weekday flown with De Havilland Canada Dash 8 turboprop aircraft and Air Atlantic operating code sharing service for Canadian Airlines with seven non-stop flights from Halifax every weekday also flown with Dash 8 aircraft. According to the OAG, Air Nova and Air Atlantic were also operating direct, no change of plane Dash 8 service into Charlottetown from Boston, Moncton and Saint John, New Brunswick with Air Nova operating direct Dash 8 flights from Fredericton, Quebec City and Yarmouth, Nova Scotia as well while Canadian Airlines was no longer operating mainline jet service into the airport at this time in 1994. By 1995, two airlines were operating non-stop service from the airport to Toronto with each air carrier operating one daily flight: Air Canada with regional jet service using the Canadair CRJ and Atlantic Island Airways with Fokker F28 Fellowship jet service. In 1999, Air Canada was operating its daily mainline non-stop flight to Toronto with a DC-9-30 jet while at the same time Royal Aviation was operating one non-stop flight a week to Toronto with a Boeing 757-200 jet.

During the summer of 2003, Jetsgo, a startup air carrier which flew Fokker 100 and McDonnell Douglas MD-80 jets, was operating three nonstop flights a week to Toronto and one nonstop flight a week to Montreal.
