= Air Toronto =

Canadian airline (1984–1991)

IATA	ICAO	Call sign
CS	CNE	CONNECTOR
- Commenced operations: December 1984
- Ceased operations: December 1991
- Hubs: Toronto Pearson
- Fleet size: See Fleet below
- Parent company: Soundair
- Headquarters: Toronto, Ontario, Canada

Air Toronto (IATA: CS, ICAO: CNE, call sign: CONNECTOR), previously Commuter Express, was a passenger airline based at Toronto Pearson International Airport. It primarily provided connector flights for passengers of Air Canada.

== History ==
Commuter Express was founded in 1984 by Soundair for scheduled commuter flights using Fairchild Metros. In 1988, with a contract to feed Air Canada at Toronto Pearson International Airport the name was changed to Air Toronto and the Metros were replaced with Jetstream 31 aircraft.

In 1990, the airline's parent company, Soundair, entered receivership, but Air Toronto was continued to operate as a separate entity as it was profitable. On October 1, 1991, Air Toronto started flying under Ontario Express and the two airlines merged in December 1991.

== Destinations ==
The following destinations were served by Air Toronto during its existence. All of the destinations served by the airline were in the United States and were served to feed Air Canada's Toronto hub.

- Akron/Canton, Ohio — Akron-Canton Airport
- Allentown / Bethlehem / Easton, Pennsylvania — Lehigh Valley International Airport
- Columbus, Ohio — Port Columbus International Airport
- Dayton, Ohio — Dayton International Airport
- Grand Rapids, Michigan — Gerald R. Ford International Airport
- Harrisburg, Pennsylvania — Harrisburg International Airport
- Indianapolis, Indiana — Indianapolis International Airport
- Kalamazoo, Michigan — Kalamazoo/Battle Creek International Airport
- Louisville, Kentucky — Louisville International Airport
- Toledo, Ohio — Toledo Express Airport

== Fleet ==
Aircraft	Total	Notes
Swearingen Merlin IV/Metro	9-11	Replaced by Jetstream 31s
BAe Jetstream 31	15	
Convair 340/440/580/640	3	
Fairchild F-27	1	

== See also ==
- List of defunct airlines of Canada
