= Jim Carroll (futurist) =

Canadian futurist (born 1959)

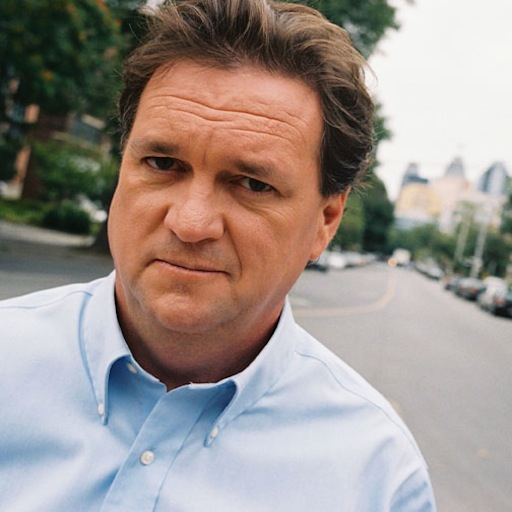
- Born: April 14, 1959 (age 67); Salaberry-de-Valleyfield, Quebec, Canada
- Occupations: Futurist; keynote speaker; author
- Known for: The Canadian Internet Handbook series
- Website: jimcarroll.com

Jim Carroll (born 1959) is a Canadian futurist, author, and keynote speaker. He is the author of The Canadian Internet Handbook, and also served as a technology columnist for The Globe and Mail from 1998 to 2008.

== Early life and education ==
Carroll was born on 14 April 1959 in Valleyfield, Quebec, the son of Alfred and Kathleen (Thompson) Carroll. He earned a Bachelor of Commerce from Dalhousie University in 1979, and qualified as a chartered accountant in 1981. In 2011, he completed the Directors Education Program at the Rotman School of Management at the University of Toronto.

== Career ==
Carroll began his accounting career in 1979 at Thorne Ernst and Whinney (which later became KPMG Canada) in Halifax, Nova Scotia. There, he became interested in personal computers and managed the rollout of the firm's national email and data conferencing systems. He also hosted Micro Minute, a local radio series on microcomputer applications. Carroll left the firm in 1990 to establish an independent technology consulting practice, J. A. Carroll Consulting.

In 1994, Carroll co-authored The Canadian Internet Handbook with Rick Broadhead, which became a bestseller in Canada. Carroll also authored or co-authored Surviving the Information Age (1997) and Selling Online (2000). He also co-hosted NetTalk, a syndicated Canadian radio program on internet trends, and later hosted eBiz with Jim Carroll, a national radio program focused on e-commerce. In September 2001, Carroll was appointed to the federal Government On-Line Advisory Panel to advise on the delivery of government services via the internet. From 1998 to 2008, Carroll wrote a regular technology and business column for The Globe and Mail and contributed columns to other publications.

By the early 2000s, Carroll shifted his professional focus from internet consulting to business futurism and keynote speaking, advocating for an alternative to traditional MBA programs. In 2000, he became a fellow of the Institute of Chartered Accountants of Ontario.

Carroll has also delivered keynote addresses at various international trade, corporate, and government conferences. Internationally, he has presented at the World Government Summit in Dubai. His speaking engagements have included presentations for NASA, the United States Department of Defense, World Bank, The Walt Disney Company and the PGA Tour.

== Recognition ==
- Internet Person of the Year (1996)
- Lifetime Achievement Award, Canadian New Media Awards (2002)
- Kenneth R. Wilson Memorial Award, Canadian Business Press (2004) — for best regularly featured department or column in CAmagazine

== Published works ==
- Carroll, Jim; Broadhead, Rick. The Canadian Internet Handbook. Prentice Hall Canada. 1994. ISBN 978-0-13-304395-2. 1999. ISBN 978-0-7737-6088-2.
- Carroll, Jim; Broadhead, Rick. The Canadian Internet Advantage: Opportunities for Business and Other Organizations. Prentice Hall Canada. 1995. ISBN 978-0-13-226598-0.
- Carroll, Jim; Broadhead, Rick. Canadian Money Management Online: Personal Finance on the Net. Prentice Hall Canada. 1996. ISBN 978-0-13-494832-4.
- Carroll, Jim. Surviving the Information Age. Prentice Hall Canada. 1997. ISBN 978-0-13-629502-0.
- Carroll, Jim; Broadhead, Rick. Small Business Online. Prentice Hall. 1998. ISBN 978-0-13-976895-8.
- Carroll, Jim; McMillan, John. Y2K Planning for Canadians: A Human Approach to a Technical Challenge:. CDG Books Canada. 1999. ISBN 978-0-7715-7680-5.
- Carroll, Jim; Broadhead, Rick. Get a (Digital) Life: An Internet Reality Check. Stoddart Publishing. 2002. ISBN 978-0-7737-6158-2.
- Carroll, Jim; Broadhead, Rick. Selling Online: How to Develop a Successful E-Commerce Business in Canada. CDG Books Canada. 2000. ISBN 978-0-7715-7643-0.
- Carroll, Jim; Broadhead, Rick. Selling Online: How to Become a Successful E-Commerce Merchant. Dearborn Trade Publishing. 2001. ISBN 978-0-7931-4517-1.
- Carroll, Jim. What I Learned from Frogs in Texas: Saving Your Skin with Forward Thinking Innovation. Oblio Press. 2005. ISBN 978-0-9736554-0-7.
- Carroll, Jim. Ready, Set, Done: How to Innovate When Faster is the New Fast Oblio Press. 2007. ISBN 978-0-9736554-2-1.
- Carroll, Jim. The Future Belongs to Those Who Are Fast: The Best of the Insight from JimCarroll.com. Oblio Press. 2012. ISBN 978-0-9736554-5-2.
- Carroll, Jim. Think Big, Start Small, Scale Fast: Stories from the Stage on Disruption, Transformation and the Accelerating Future. Oblio Press. 2017. ISBN 978-0-9736554-7-6.
- Carroll, Jim. Embracing Mediocrity: How to Do Nothing Notable and Accomplish as Little as Possible. Oblio Press. 2025. ISBN 978-0-9736554-9-0.
- Carroll, Jim. Dancing in the Rain: How Bold Leaders Grow Stronger in Stormy Times. Oblio Press. 2025. ISBN 978-1-0694693-1-1.
- Carroll, Jim. Being Unique: Why the Rebels, the Odd Ones Out, and the Crazy Ones Always Win!. Oblio Press. 2026. ISBN 978-1069469328
