= Inter-Canadien =

Regional airline of Canada (1986–1999)

| IATA | ICAO | Call sign |
|---|---|---|
| ND | ICN | INTER-CANADIEN |
- Founded: 1986
- Ceased operations: November 27, 1999
- Hubs: Halifax; Montréal–Dorval; Montréal–Mirabel; Toronto–Pearson
- Frequent-flyer program: Canadian Plus
- Destinations: See list below
- Headquarters: Dorval, Quebec

Inter-Canadien was a Canadian airline headquartered in Dorval, Quebec.

== History ==
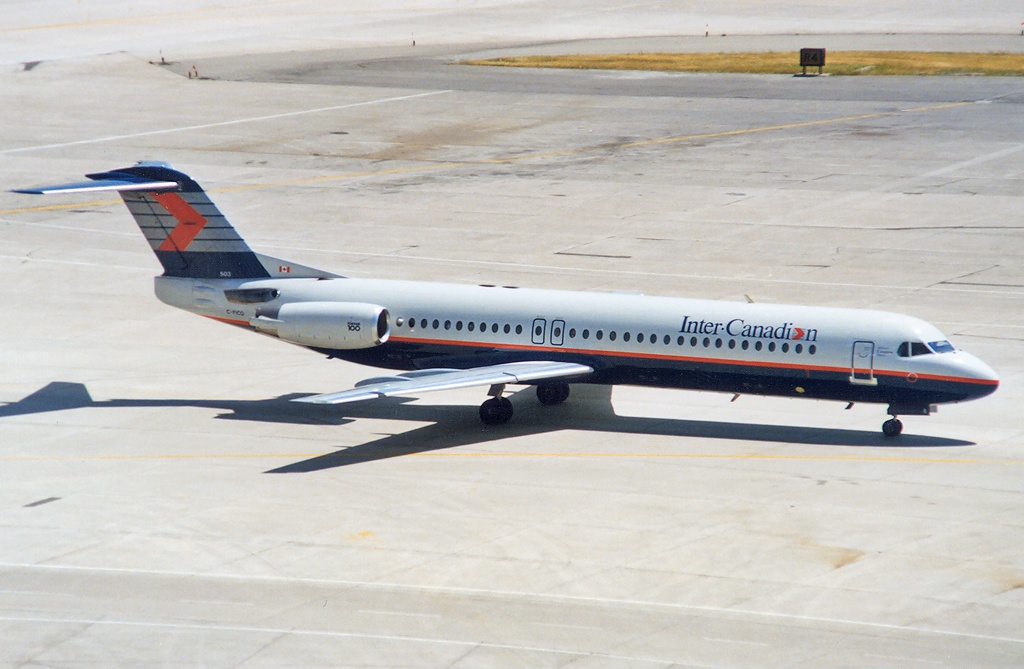
Fokker 100 in 1989

Inter-Canadien traces its roots back to Quebecair, which was founded in 1949. Quebecair grew to become a second-tier regional airline, operating British Aircraft Corporation BAC One-Eleven, Boeing 727-100, Boeing 737-200, and Fokker F28 Fellowship jets, as well as Convair 580, Fairchild F-27, and Hawker Siddeley HS 748 turboprops and other propeller aircraft on routes throughout the province of Quebec, New Brunswick, and elsewhere in eastern Canada. In 1986, Quebecair was purchased by PWA Corporation (owner of Pacific Western Airlines), the parent of Canadian Airlines International, and merged with the regional subsidiary of Nordair, another Montreal-based airline that had also been acquired by PWA Corporation.

In the late 1980s, Inter-Canadien rolled over its fleet, becoming the North American launch customer for the Fokker 100 twin jet and the first Canadian operator of the ATR 42 turboprop. At the same time, Canadian Airlines International sold control of Inter-Canadien to local businessman Michel Leblanc, but the airline continued to operate as a code-share partner of Canadian's.

In 1990, Inter-Canadien cancelled its code-share agreement and began competing with Canadian Airlines International and Air Canada on high density routes between Montreal, Ottawa, Toronto, and Halifax. This new business plan was a failure, ending with Inter-Canadien entering court protection in 1991. Canadian Airlines International then repurchased the airline, returning it to its role as Canadian's Quebec feeder airline, disposing of the Fokker 100s, and standardizing the fleet on the ATR 42. In 1996, Inter-Canadien became a wholly owned subsidiary of Canadian Regional Airlines, then the largest regional carrier in Canada and itself owned by Canadian Airlines International.

In September 1998, Canadian Regional sold Inter-Canadien to Canadian Investors Group, a Toronto-based investment company owned by Robert Myhill and his partners. At the same time, Canadian Airlines International cancelled its code-share agreement with Air Atlantic and transferred Air Atlantic's routes in Atlantic Canada to Inter-Canadien. It also transferred a number of Canadian Regional Airlines routes in Ontario. As a result, Inter-Canadien almost doubled in size, increasing its fleet from ten ATR 42s to 16 ATR propjets and three Fokker F28 Fellowship twin jets operating on a route network that reached from St, John's, Newfoundland, in the east to Sault Ste. Marie, Ontario, in the west. In July 1999, the airline announced an order for six new Embraer ERJ-135 regional jets, but these jets were never operated by the airline.

Inter-Canadien suspended flight operations November 27, 1999, concurrent with the collapse of its code-share partner, Canadian Airlines International (which was acquired by Air Canada). The airline entered bankruptcy in April 2000. Its hangar facilities and maintenance licences were acquired by ExelTech Aerospace.

== Management ==
- CEO Robert Myhill (1998-1999)
- Vice President, Customer Service Michel Gagné (-1999)
- Director, Human Resources Alain Desgagné, CHRP (1995-1999)
- Director, Flight Operations Robert Learchaft (1998-1999)
- Director, Maintenance Wayne Donald (1996-1999)

== Staff ==
- 1,100 staff (1999)
- 400 pilots (1999)

== Fleet ==
- ATR-42-300 (1988-1999)
- Fokker F28 Fellowship (1998-1999)
- Fokker 100 (1987-1991)

== Hubs and destinations ==
When it ceased flight operations in 1999, Inter-Canadien was flying to 28 destinations in Canada:

- Ontario
  - Kingston
  - London
  - Sault Ste Marie
  - Ottawa
  - Toronto - Hub
- Quebec
  - Bagotville
  - Baie Comeau
  - Chibougamau
  - Gaspe
  - Iles de la Madeilaine
  - La Grande
  - Mont Joli
  - Montreal - Hub
  - Quebec City
  - Rouyn-Noranda
  - Sept-Iles
  - Val d'Or
- Atlantic Canada
  - Charlo
  - Charlottetown
  - Chatham
  - Deer Lake
  - Fredericton
  - Gander
  - Halifax - Hub
  - Moncton
  - Saint John
  - St John's
  - Stephenville
  - Sydney
  - Wabush

== See also ==
- List of defunct airlines of Canada
