= Sitebrand =

Canadian digital marketing Firm

Sitebrand Corporation
- Company type: Creditor protection
- Industry: Online marketing
- Founded: 2000; 26 years ago in Ottawa
- Founder: Justin Shimoon
- Defunct: 2011
- Fate: Acquired by Cactus Commerce
- Headquarters: Gatineau, Quebec, Canada
- Website: www.sitebrand.com on Internet Archive

Sitebrand was an online marketing company based in Gatineau, Quebec, Canada. Sitebrand created technology which assisted its clients in expanding the number of purchases of customers who click on advertisement links. One of its biggest clients was Roots Canada.

== History ==
Sitebrand was founded in 2000 by Justin Shimoon, who had previously worked at Nortel. Originally based in Ottawa, the company relocated to Gatineau in September 2002. In August 2000, investors gave the company $1 million, of which 75% came from private an angel investors and 15% came from venture capital. It created InSite, a software it offered for an annual fee of $20,000 to $60,000, that conducts a review of how people access websites and tries to use bargains to lure them. In June 2008, the company was listed on the TSX Venture Exchange and had 40 employees.

== Acquisition ==
In 2008, the company was acquired by Pretium Capital for $5.1 million in a reverse takeover. In December 2008, Sitebrand partnered with email service provider Silverpop to enhance their email product offering to online marketers.

In 2010, Sitebrand obtained creditor protection. Chris Corman, who had taken over as CEO from Shimoon in 2009, resigned. The company had difficulty becoming profitable over the years. While Corman had initially been able to increase sales and decrease expenses, by December 2010 experienced substantial losses in its revenue. During the Great Recession, the company laid off employees.

On February 17, 2011, Cactus Commerce acquired all assets of Sitebrand.com. On October 24, 2011, Sitebrand formally changed its name to Marchwell Ventures. It raised approximately $1 million in a private placement. It transferred its shares from the TSX Venture Exchange to the NEX.

== See also ==
- Insight Online
