= Air BC =

Regional airline of Canada (1980–2001)

Air BC Ltd.

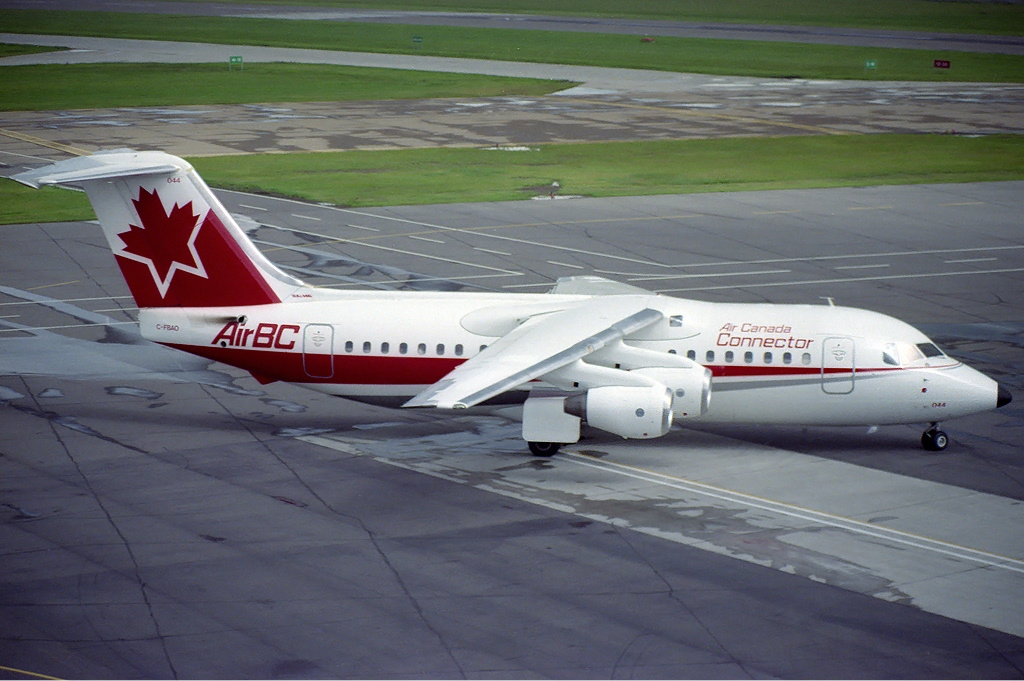
- BAe 146-200 in Air Canada Connector livery in 1989
IATA	ICAO	Call sign
ZX	ABL	AIRCOACH
- Founded: December 1, 1980
- Ceased operations: November 1, 2001 (merged with Air Nova, Air Ontario and Canadian Regional Airlines to form Air Canada Jazz)
- Hubs: Vancouver International Airport
- Frequent-flyer program: Aeroplan
- Alliance: Star Alliance (affiliate; 1997–2001)
- Parent company: Air Canada
- Headquarters: Richmond, British Columbia, Canada

Air BC was a Canadian regional airline headquartered in Richmond, British Columbia, Canada. It later became part of Air Canada Jazz. This regional airline primarily flew turboprop aircraft but also operated jets as well as an Air Canada Connector carrier on behalf of Air Canada via a code share feeder agreement.

== History ==
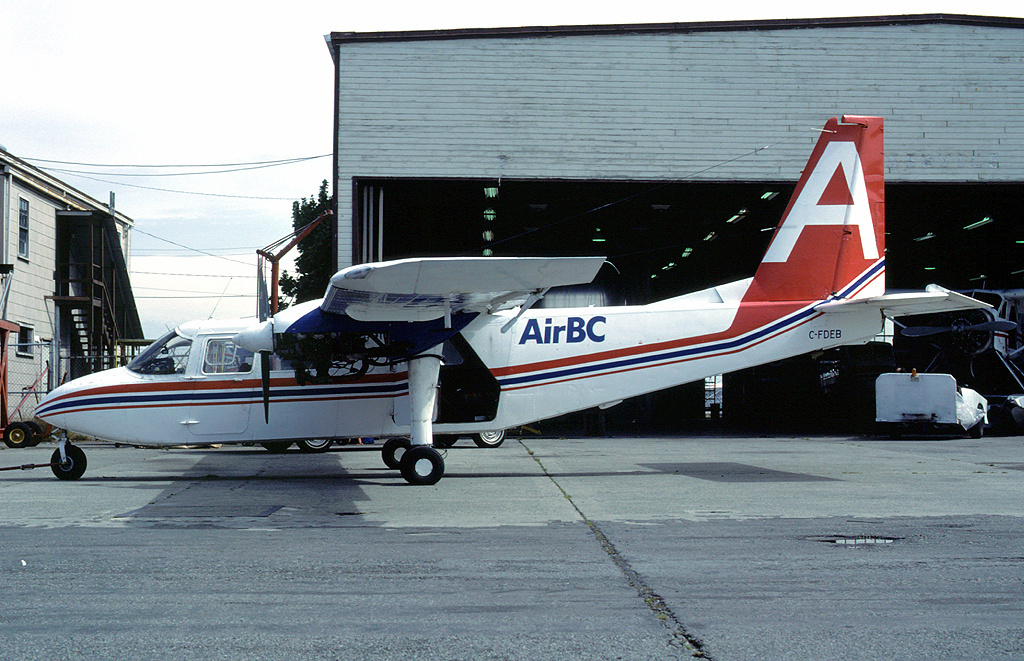
A BN-2 Islander aircraft in 1983 at Vancouver International Airport (YVR)

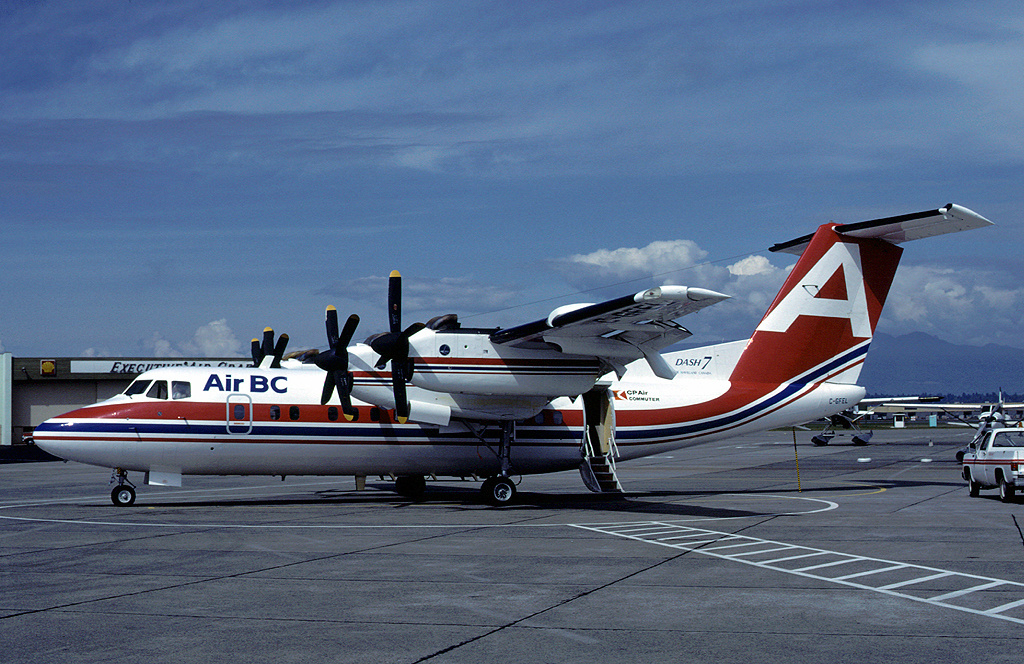
A DHC-7 Dash 7 aircraft in 1983 at Vancouver International Airport (YVR)

Air BC was established in 1980 after the merger (by the Jim Pattison Group) of a number of west coast domestic airlines: Calumet Air Service, Canadian Air Transit, Flight Operation, Gulf Air Aviation, Haida Airlines, Island Airlines, Omineca Air Services, Pacific Coast Air Services and West Coast Air Services. A combined fleet emerged, including STOL capable de Havilland Canada DHC-6 Twin Otters with some Twin Otters being operated as float planes. In 1983, STOL capable DHC-7 Dash 7 turboprop aircraft were delivered and then in 1986 DHC-8 Dash 8-100 turboprops were acquired.

In 1987, Air Canada purchased 85% of Air BC and with Air Nova both air carriers became Air Canada regional partners operating as Air Canada Connector. Air BC entered the jet age in 1988 with British Aerospace BAe 146-200 aircraft which was the only jetliner type ever operated by the air carrier. In 1994, the airline was operating British Aerospace Jetstream 31 propjets as part of their Air Canada Connector code share feeder services. Stretched DHC-8 Dash 8-300 turboprop aircraft were introduced as well. In March 1995, Air Canada purchased the remaining shares of Air BC.

In January 2001, a newly merged carrier called Air Canada Regional Inc was established. A wholly owned subsidiary of Air Canada, this company combined the individual strengths of five regional airlines – Air BC, Air Nova, Air Ontario, Air Alliance and Canadian Regional Airlines. Consolidation of these five companies was completed in 2002 and was marked by the launch of a new name and brand: Air Canada Jazz.

AirBC logo during the late 1980s, before being bought by Air Canada.

== Destinations ==
Air BC served the following destinations in the fall of 1991 in Canada and the U.S. according to the Air BC – Air Canada Connector November 3, 1991, system timetable route map; by 1999, Air BC had expanded its Air Canada Connector service and was flying BAe 146-200 jet service nonstop between Edmonton and Denver. In 2001, Air BC was operating Air Canada Connector service with its BAe 146-200 jets nonstop to Denver from Edmonton, Winnipeg and Vancouver.

Alberta

- Calgary — Calgary International Airport
- Edmonton
  - Edmonton City Centre Airport
  - Edmonton International Airport
- Fort McMurray — Fort McMurray International Airport
- Grande Prairie — Grande Prairie Airport
- Lethbridge — Lethbridge Airport
- Lloydminster — Lloydminster Airport
- Medicine Hat — Medicine Hat Airport

British Columbia

- Abbotsford — Abbotsford International Airport
- Campbell River — Campbell River Airport
- Castlegar — West Kootenay Regional Airport
- Comox — Comox Valley Airport
- Cranbrook — Cranbrook/Canadian Rockies International Airport
- Dawson Creek — Dawson Creek Airport
- Kamloops — Kamloops Airport
- Kelowna — Kelowna International Airport
- Nanaimo — Nanaimo Airport
- Penticton — Penticton Regional Airport
- Powell River — Powell River Airport
- Prince George — Prince George Airport
- Prince Rupert — Prince Rupert Airport
- Quesnel — Quesnel Airport
- Sandspit — Sandspit Airport
- Terrace — Northwest Regional Airport Terrace-Kitimat
- Vancouver — Vancouver International Airport
- Victoria — Victoria International Airport
- Williams Lake — Williams Lake Airport

Manitoba

- Winnipeg — Winnipeg James Armstrong Richardson International Airport

Saskatchewan

- Regina — Regina International Airport
- Saskatoon — Saskatoon John G. Diefenbaker International Airport

United States

- Denver, Colorado — Denver International Airport
- Las Vegas, Nevada — McCarran International Airport
- Portland, Oregon — Portland International Airport
- Seattle, Washington — Seattle–Tacoma International Airport

== Fleet ==
Air BC operated the following aircraft:

Air BC fleet
Aircraft	Total	Introduced	Retired	Notes
BAe 146-100	1	1980	2002	
BAe 146-200	7	1988	2001	
BAe Jetstream 31	Unknown	Unknown	Unknown	
Britten-Norman BN-2A Islander	Unknown	Unknown	Unknown	
de Havilland Canada DHC-6 Twin Otter	8	1980	1996	
de Havilland Canada DHC-7 Dash 7	Unknown	Unknown	Unknown	
de Havilland Canada DHC-8-100 Dash 8	15	1985	2002	
de Havilland Canada DHC-8-300 Dash 8	6	1990	2002	

== See also ==
- List of defunct airlines of Canada
