= Ontario Express =

Regional airline of Canada (1987–1993)

IATA	ICAO	Call sign
9X	OEL	PARTNER
- Commenced operations: July 15, 1987
- Ceased operations: April 1993 (merged with Time Air to form Canadian Regional Airlines)
- Hubs: Toronto Pearson International Airport
- Frequent-flyer program: Canadian Plus
- Parent company: Canadian Airlines International
- Headquarters: Toronto, Ontario, Canada

Ontario Express was a regional airline in Canada.

== History ==
Ontario Express first started operations on July 15, 1987 as a regional feeder airline for Canadian Airlines based at the Toronto Pearson International Airport. It began service to Hamilton in March 1989. This was a way to apply the newly designed commercial aviation strategy at the time: use smaller aircraft to gather passengers from various locations and "feed" the main airline which would then carry those passengers worldwide. The term "feeder airline" became a standard in all commercial aviation. The other term employed was a "spoke and wheel" type of organization, the spoke being the centre where all the feeder airlines would fly in the passengers from around the area. Operations started with 4 Jetstream 31 aircraft, manufactured by British Aerospace. ATR 42 aircraft, built by a Franco-Italian consortium Avions de transport régional, were added to the fleet in 1988. Ontario Express was the first airline to import and operate those 2 aircraft in Canada. The first cities that were connected to Toronto were: Windsor, Sault Ste. Marie, Sarnia, London, Kingston, Thunder Bay, Ottawa, and Sudbury.
