= Insight Online =

New Zealand-based online marketing agency

- Type: Private company
- Industry: Online marketing
- Founded: 2012; 14 years ago
- Founder: Kim Voon
- Headquarters: Auckland, New Zealand
- Area served: New Zealand
- Products: Search engine marketing and search engine optimization
- Website: insightonline.co.nz

Insight Online is a New Zealand-based online marketing agency that provides search engine marketing (SEM), search engine optimization (SEO) and Google Analytics services. The company has offices based in Auckland, New Zealand and has been running since 2012.

== History ==
Insight Online was founded by Kim Voon who had previously worked as a consultant at SureFire Search, a search marketing company. Prior to that, Kim worked for just over two years as an online marketing analyst at Westpac New Zealand and also worked at Lloyds TSB and BP in London, UK.

The company's services are based on a monthly retainer model which varies depending on the scope and length of the engagement and expected return on investment for their clients.

Since 2012, Insight Online have been featured in The New Zealand Herald, Workflow Max, Auckland Chamber of Commerce and Web Torque websites giving advice on online marketing and the challenges of setting up a small business in New Zealand.
