= Air Nova =

Regional airline of Canada (1986–2001)

Air Nova Inc.
IATA	ICAO	Call sign
QK	ARN	NOVA
- Founded: July 1986
- Ceased operations: November 1, 2001 (merged with Air BC, Air Ontario and Canadian Regional Airlines to form Air Canada Jazz)
- Hubs: Halifax Stanfield International Airport
- Frequent-flyer program: Aeroplan
- Alliance: Star Alliance (affiliate; 1997–2001)
- Parent company: Air Canada
- Headquarters: Enfield, Nova Scotia, Canada

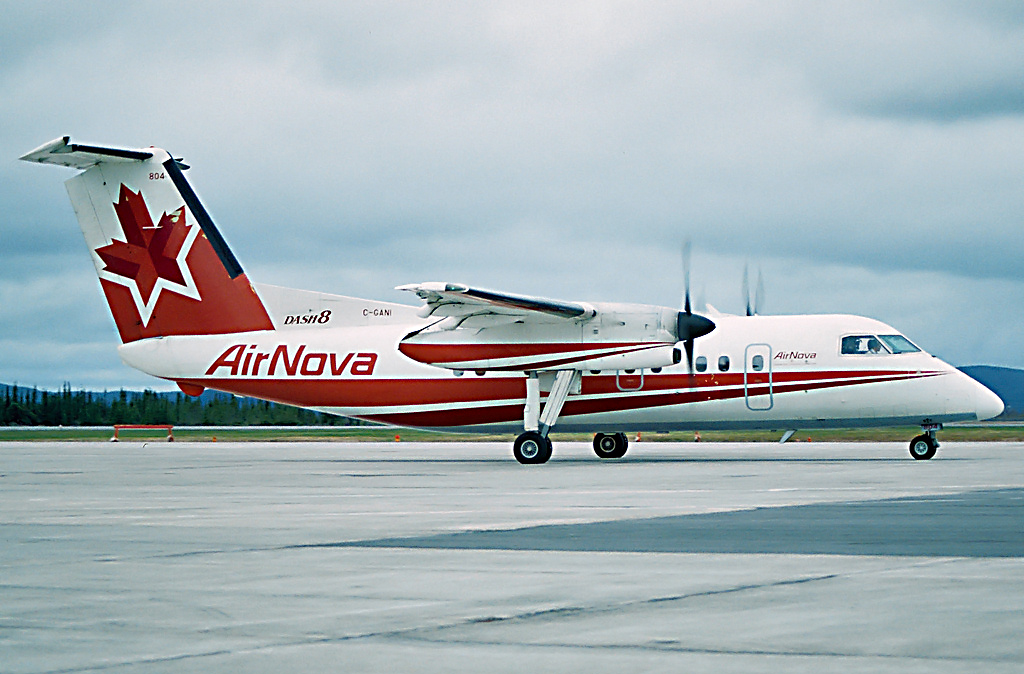
De Havilland Canada Dash 8-102

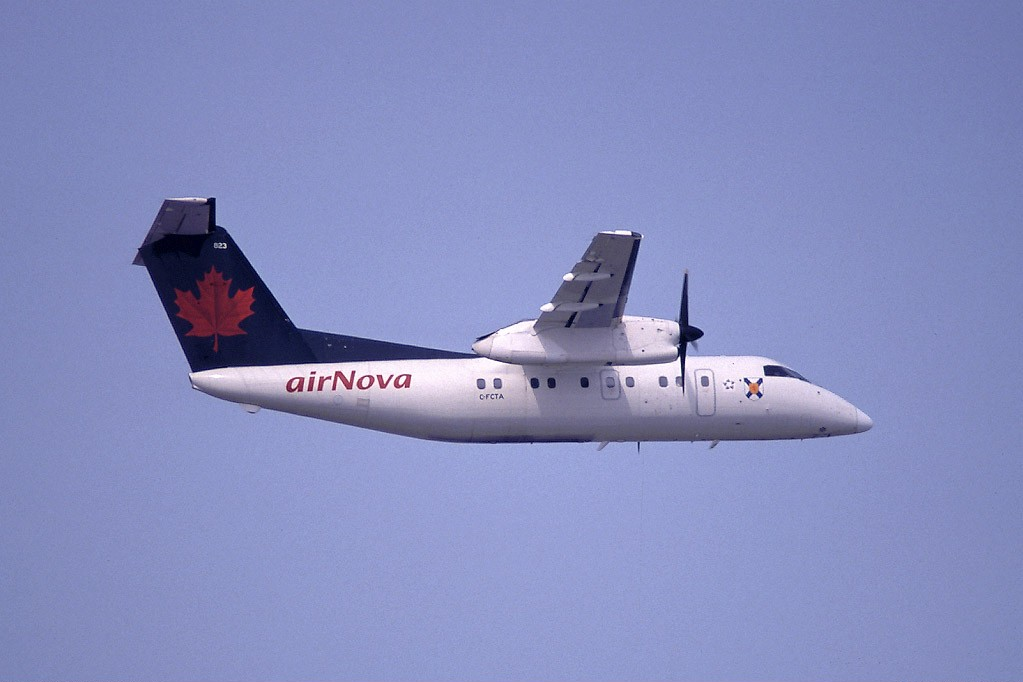
De Havilland Canada Dash 8-102

Air Nova was a Canadian regional airline based in Enfield, Nova Scotia, Canada that became part of Air Canada Regional in 2001. In 2002, the airlines Air BC, Air Ontario, Air Nova and Canadian Regional Airlines were merged to form a new airline, named Air Canada Jazz.

== History ==
After the consolidation of Air Alliance, Air Nova served 28 destinations throughout eastern Canada and the United States.

Air Nova was a wholly owned subsidiary of Air Canada.

== Fleet ==
During Air Nova's service they operated the following aircraft:

Air Nova fleet
Aircraft	Total	Introduced	Retired	Notes
BAe 146-100	2	1988	1989	
BAe 146-200	9	1989	2001	
Beechcraft 1900D	5	Unknown	Unknown	
de Havilland Canada DHC-8-100 Dash 8	30	1986	2002	
de Havilland Canada DHC-8-300 Dash 8	7	1989	2002	

== See also ==
- List of defunct airlines of Canada
