= AllCanada Express =

Canadian cargo airline from 1992 to 2005

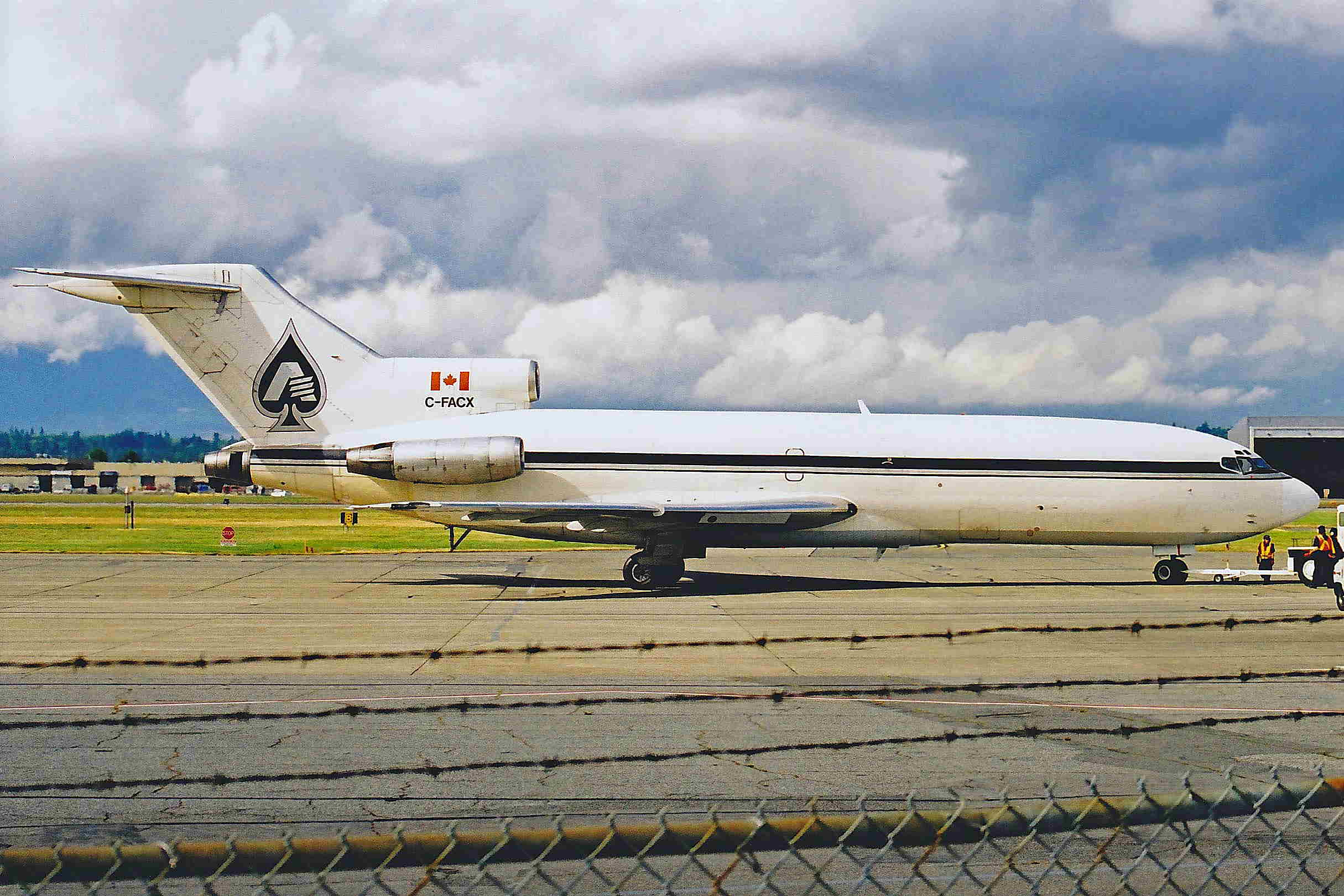
IATA	ICAO	Call sign
—	CNX	Canex
- Founded: 1992
- Ceased operations: 2005
- Headquarters: Mississauga, Ontario, Canada

AllCanada Express was a cargo airline based in Mississauga, Ontario, Canada. It operated nightly flights to some of the major United States cargo hubs and to Central America, South America and the Caribbean.

== History ==
The Canadian airline AllCanada Express (ACE) was established in October 1992 by John MacKenzie and Murray Lantz after they sold their 30% stake in CanAir Cargo.

Canair had been founded by MacKenzie, Lantz, Goliger and Ontario Express Ltd. O/A Canadian Partner through a restructuring of Tempus Air in 1989. By 1992 Ontario Express had been rolled into Canadian Regional Airlines and wanted to sell its 55% stake in Canair. Goliger bought out the Canadian Regional, MacKenzie and Lantz interest in Canair in September 1992.

In 1992 ACE operations started as a cargo airline with one Convair 580 doing ad hoc cargo charter work. ACE built up to four CV 580s flying primarily for Canadian Airlines and in August 1994 received its first contract to fly a Boeing 727-100 for Burlington Air Express (BAX Global). A second B727 and a CV 580 was added for in 1995. In 1997 ACE picked up the UPS contract for domestic Canada line-haul and added two more B727-200Fs. The ACE aircraft were very noticeable in their silver and black livery with the "ACE of Spades" on the tail.

By 2001–2002, ACE had grown to a fleet of twelve Boeing 727s operating for BAX, UPS, DHL, and Canada 3000 Cargo and was earning approximately $60 million in annual revenue.

By the end of 2004, ACE Inc. had three B727 freighters dedicated to flying perishables, flowers and cargo between Toronto, Havana, Caracas, Bogotá, Quito, and Mexico City. ACE became the first truly international Canadian heavy jet cargo carrier.

In late 2004, ACE committed to Finova to take a former Canadian Airlines DC10-30F on lease to commence operations between Canada, Europe and South America. The company signed an agreement with Omni Air in Tulsa, Oklahoma to write manuals and commence pilot training.

Ultimately a new agreement was reached in October 2005 where Cargojet assumed the Bermuda and BAX business, assets and certain employees of ACE went over to Cargojet.

The former ACE B727s were sold to Allied Air Cargo in Nigeria, a subsidiary of DAS, or were parted out.

== Fleet ==
The AllCanada Express fleet consists of the following aircraft (at August 2006):

- 2 Boeing 727-200F
- 1 Convair 580 (C-FHEL)

Previously operated:

- 1 Bombardier Learjet 35A

== See also ==
- List of defunct airlines of Canada
