= Canadian Internet Handbook =

Series of non-fiction books

The cover of the 1994 edition of the Canadian Internet Handbook

The Canadian Internet Handbook was a series of non-fiction books written by Jim Carroll and Rick Broadhead. It was first published in March 1994 aimed at an audience new to computers, describing the basics of how to use the Internet. Books contained information on what the Internet is, how to get connected, how it works, as well as a directory of internet-based services.

== Reception ==
Within 6 weeks of the initial publication on March 7, 1994, the Canadian Internet Handbook was the number 1 best selling book according to The Globe and Mail and the National Post. Reviews of the initial and later editions were mostly favourable, citing the expertise of the authors as well as the comprehensiveness of the books. Success continued throughout the 1990s, but the dot-com bubble of 2001 eventually resulted in the downfall of the series. No further editions were released.
