= Soundair =

Canadian airline

Soundair Corporation Soundair Express
IATA	ICAO	Call sign
?	SDR	SOUNDAIR
- Commenced operations: 1973
- Ceased operations: April 1990
- Subsidiaries: Air Toronto; Odyssey International
- Fleet size: See Fleet below
- Headquarters: Toronto, Ontario, Canada

Soundair (ICAO: SDR, call sign: SOUNDAIR), previously Owen Sound Air Services, dba Soundair Express, was a freight airline based in Mississauga, Ontario, Canada. The airline was the parent company of Air Toronto and Odyssey International and operated freight flights under the brand Soundair Express.

== History ==
In 1973, Owen Sound Air Services was founded as a flying school and charter airline. Over the years, the airline grew by flying cargo for Purolator, Airborne Express, and Emery using Douglas DC-3s. In 1984, Soundair Corp. was created as a parent company. That same year, the airline acquired Aero Trades Western as well as its DC-3s and DC-4s.

In 1984, Soundair created two new airlines, Commuter Express and Odyssey International. Commuter Express was to provide local airline service to Toronto Pearson International Airport. In 1986, The DC-4s were replaced with Convair CV-580s and the DC-3s with Fokker F27 Friendships.

In 1988, Commuter Express became an Air Canada Connector and was renamed to Air Toronto. That same year, Odyssey International, a Toronto-based leisure airline, was founded and contracted cargo flights were rebranded as Soundair Express.

In 1990, the company entered receivership due to financial troubles and fell under control of Ernst & Young. Odyssey and Soundair Express ceased operations in April 1990 when Odyssey was purchased by Nation Air and Soundair Express was purchase by Canair Cargo.

In 1991, Air Toronto was purchased by Ontario Express (Air Ontario) in November of that year.

== Fleet ==
=== Fleet as of receivership ===
Aircraft	Total
Dassault Falcon 2000	2
Douglas DC-8	1

=== Historic fleet ===
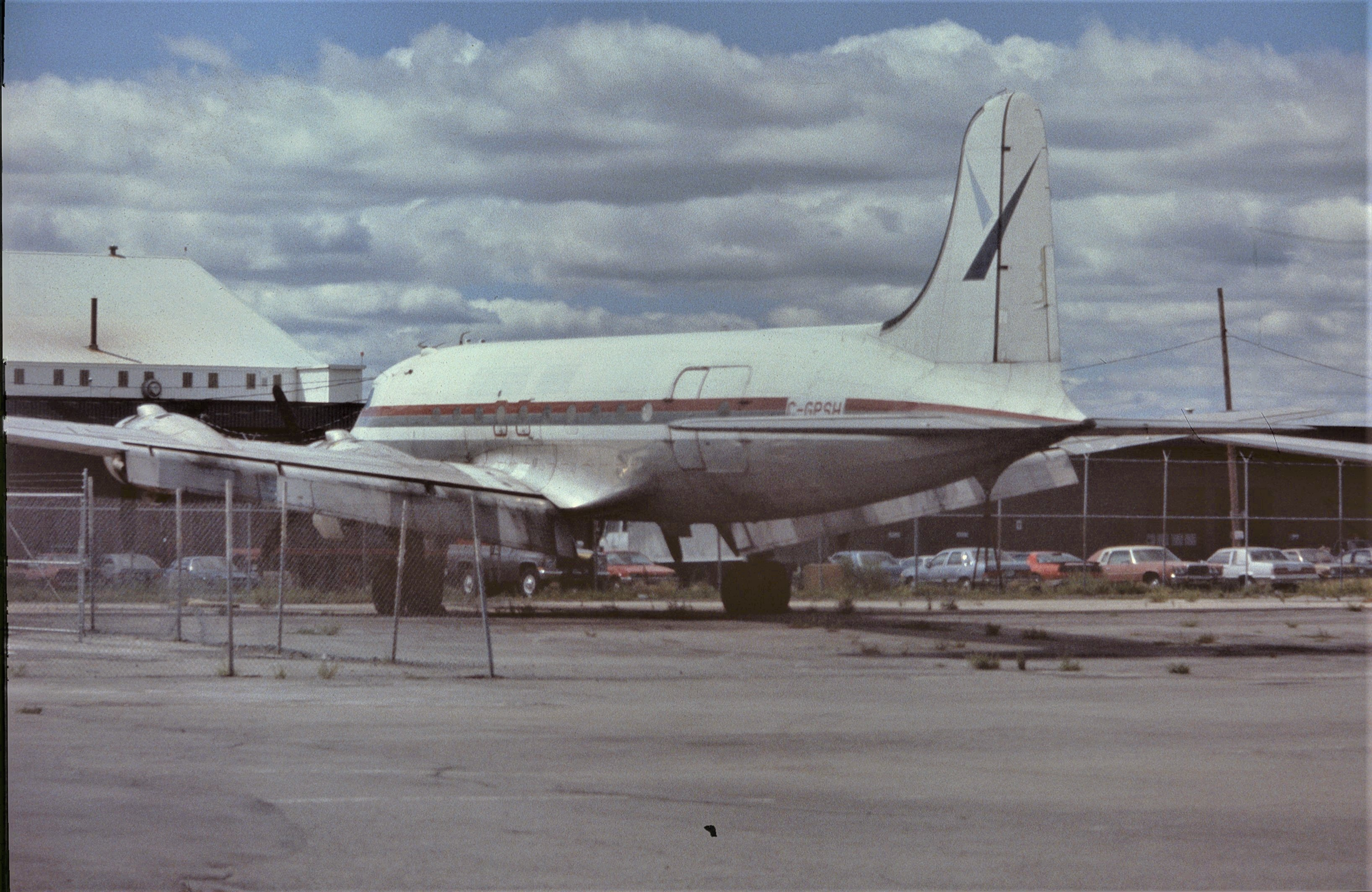
Soundair Douglas DC-4

Aircraft	Total
Douglas DC-4	3
Douglas DC-3	5
Piper PA-31T Cheyenne	1

=== Subsidiary fleet ===
Aircraft	Total	Airline	Notes
Swearingen Merlin IV/Metro	9-11	Air Toronto	Replaced by Jetstream 31s
BAe Jetstream 31	15	Air Toronto	
Convair 340/440/580/640	3	Air Toronto	
Fairchild F-27	1	Air Toronto	
Boeing 757	5	Odyssey International	
Boeing 737 -200 & -300	3	Odyssey International	

== See also ==
- List of defunct airlines of Canada
