= Odyssey International =

IATA	ICAO	Call sign
OL	ODY	ODYSSEY
- Commenced operations: November 1988
- Ceased operations: April 1990
- Fleet size: See Fleet below
- Parent company: Soundair
- Headquarters: Toronto, Ontario, Canada

Odyssey International (IATA: OL, ICAO: ODY, call sign: Odyssey) was a charter airline based in Toronto, Ontario, Canada.

== History ==
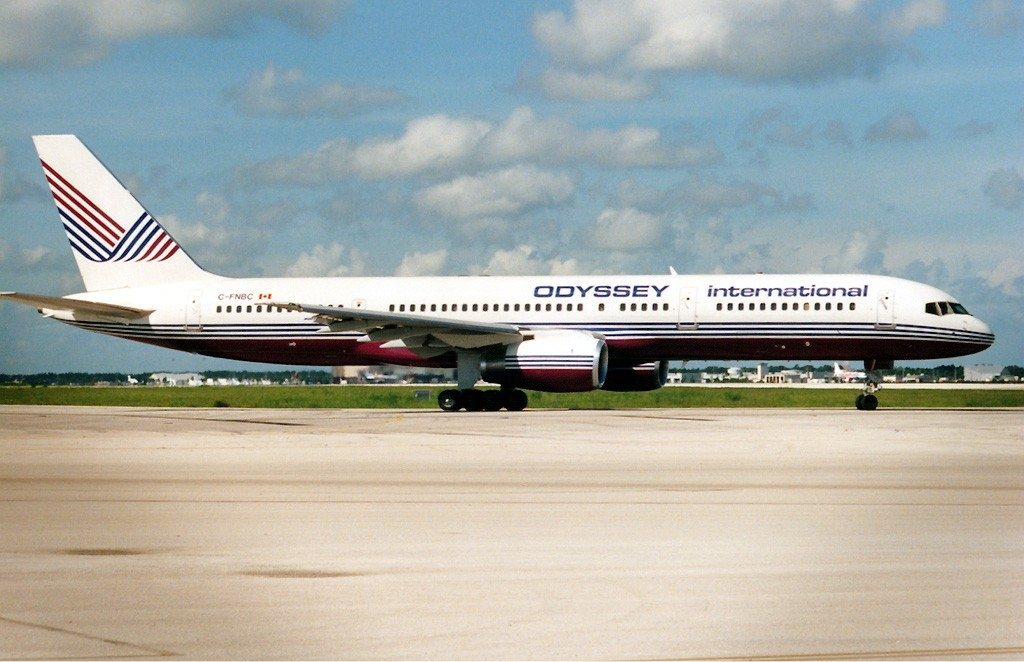
A Odyssey International Boeing 757

In June 1988, Odyssey International was founded by Soundair. Flights began using Boeing 757-28A between Toronto and Las Vegas. Odyssey used the 757s to operate to winter seasonal destinations in the Caribbean and for the summer season Leeds Bradford International Airport and Newcastle in England were served. In order to serve smaller markets, two Boeing 737-3S3 were leased. A Boeing 767-200ER was also placed on order to expand the fleet and entertain more European destinations with fewer stops.

In 1990, the parent company Soundair, was closed causing Odyssey International to cease operations by April 1990.

The Odyssey name, aircraft and some employees were merged with Nationair, and operated as a separate division of Nolisair for a short period of time. Within several months, the Odyssey livery and all references to Odyssey were dropped and employees uniforms changed to those of Nationair, which went bankrupt in 1993.

== Fleet ==
Aircraft	Total
Boeing 757	3
Boeing 737 -200 & -300	2

== See also ==
- List of defunct airlines of Canada
