= Canadian Airlines =

Airline of Canada (1987–2001)

Canadian Airlines International
- last logo, from 1999 to 2001.

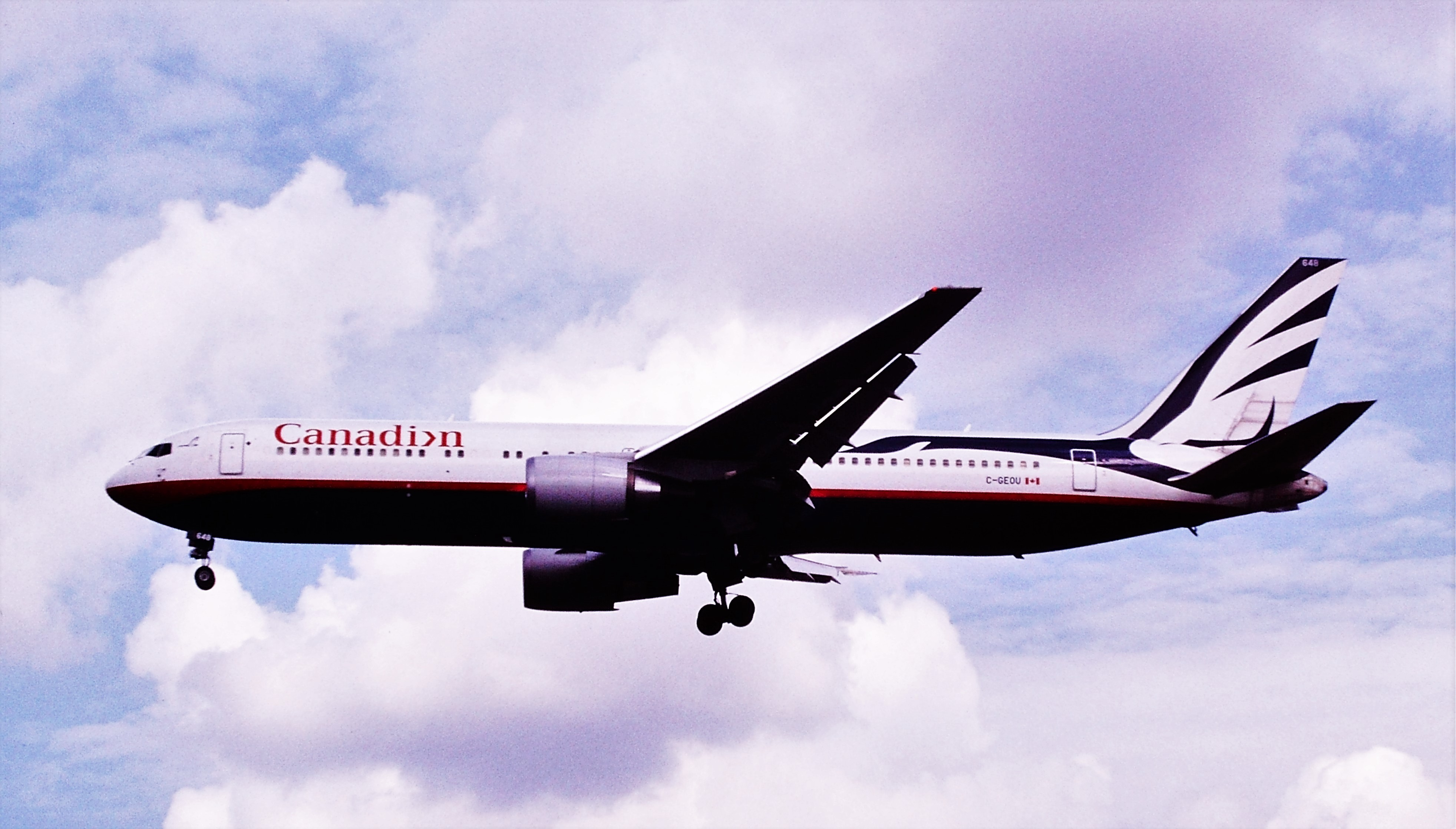
- A Boeing 767 of Canadian Airlines
IATA	ICAO	Call sign
CP	CDN	CANADIAN
- Founded: March 27, 1987; 39 years ago (amalgamation)
- Ceased operations: January 1, 2001; 25 years ago (acquired by and integrated into Air Canada)
- Hubs: Calgary; Montréal–Dorval; Montréal–Mirabel; Toronto–Pearson; Vancouver
- Focus cities: Edmonton; Halifax; Ottawa
- Frequent-flyer program: Canadian Plus
- Alliance: Oneworld (1999–2000)
- Subsidiaries: Air Atlantic; Calm Air; Canadian North; Canadian Regional Airlines (1993–2001); Inter-Canadien; Ontario Express (until 1993); Time Air (until 1993)
- Parent company: Canadian Airlines Corporation
- Headquarters: Calgary, Alberta, Canada
- Key people: Kevin Benson (president & CEO)

Canadian Airlines International Ltd. (stylized as Canadi›n Airlines or Canadi‹n Airlines, or simply Canadian) was a major Canadian airline that operated from 1987 until 2001. The airline was Canada's second largest airline after Air Canada, carrying more than 11.9 million passengers to over 160 destinations in 17 countries on five continents at its height in 1996. Canadian Airlines served 105 destinations in Canada, more than any other airline. It was a founding member of the Oneworld airline alliance. Canadian Airlines was headquartered in Calgary, and had revenue of approximately $3 billion at the end of 1999.

The airline and its aircraft were acquired by Air Canada in 2000, and the merger was officially completed on January 1, 2001.

== History ==
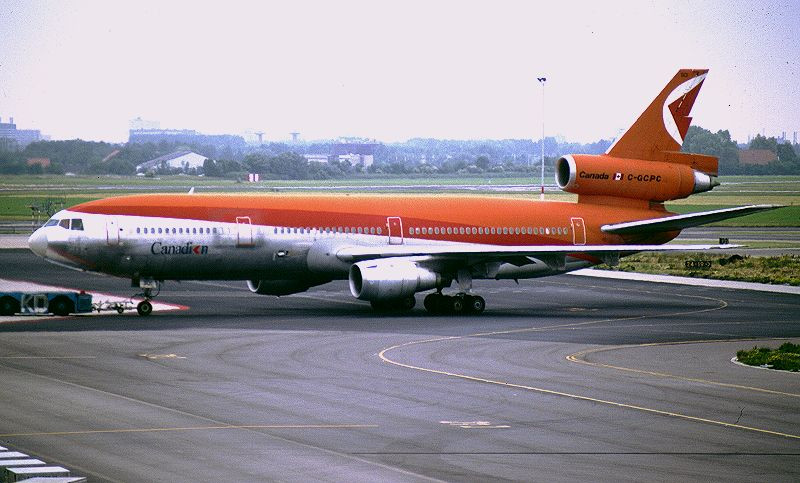
A McDonnell Douglas DC-10-30 in crossover CP Air livery at Amsterdam Airport Schiphol in 1988

Canadian Airlines International was the principal subsidiary of Canadian Airlines Corporation. The new airline was formed on March 27, 1987, when Pacific Western Airlines purchased Canadian Pacific Air Lines (also known as CP Air), which in turn had recently acquired Eastern Provincial Airways and Nordair.

In 1989, Canadian Airlines acquired Wardair, giving it access to new routes including long-sought-after routes to the UK and Europe. Its major hubs were at Montréal-Dorval International Airport (now known as Montréal-Pierre Elliott Trudeau International Airport), Toronto Pearson International Airport, Vancouver International Airport and Calgary International Airport.

After the 1991 airline industry slump, Canadian Airlines streamlined its operations and went through the financial restructuring of over $700 million in debt. It was further aided by an injection of cash from AMR Corp., the parent of American Airlines.

On November 1, 1996, Kevin Benson, then president and CEO, unveiled a restructuring strategy to improve the profitability of Canadian Airlines International. The operational restructuring plan was supposed to be phased in over a four-year period, addressing the main issues of cost control, revenue growth, capitalization and fleet renewal. It was also one of the founding members of the Oneworld airline alliance, along with American Airlines, British Airways, Cathay Pacific and Qantas. The plan started off well but with the effects of the 1997 Asian financial crisis, air traffic decreased and Canadian suffered heavy losses on previously profitable trans-Pacific routes.

The first Canadian Airlines logo

Canadian Plus was the largest frequent flyer program in Canada with more than 60 airline, hotel, car rental, and financial partners worldwide. The program had more than three million members.

In its last few years of operation, Canadian Airlines extended its international route network in Asia, with the last being the addition of service to the Philippines, which gave it seven destinations in Asia. At that time Canadian Airlines had the distinction of flying to more places in Asia with more frequency than any other Canadian carrier.

Canadian Airlines' core business strategy focused on building its Vancouver hub into the leading gateway between North America and Asia. It leveraged its codesharing agreement with American Airlines in order to help capture a greater share of U.S.-Asia traffic flows.

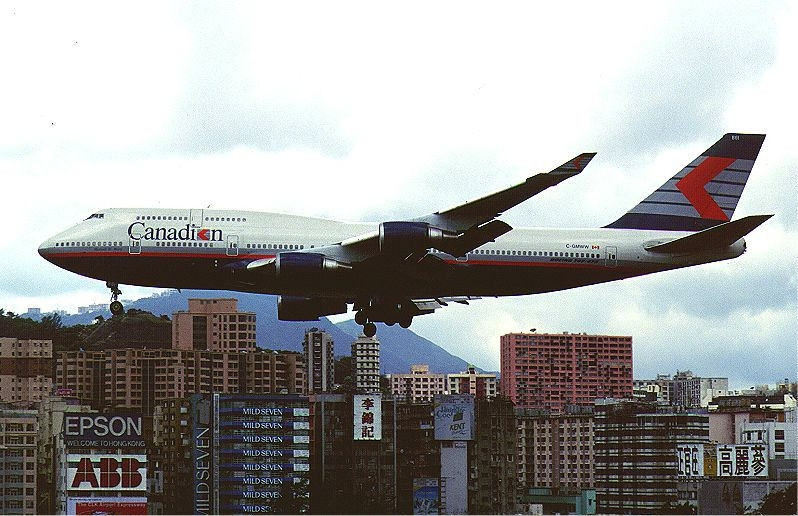
A Boeing 747-400 landing at Kai Tak Airport in 1998

=== Onex bid and Air Canada takeover ===
On August 20, 1999, Air Canada proposed a financial offer to Canadian Airlines which would see Canadian's international routes and airport slots sold to Air Canada for an undisclosed amount. Canadian Airlines would be relegated to be a regional carrier providing a feeder network to Air Canada. This offer was rejected. This financial offer evolved from a merger proposal between Canadian Airlines and Air Canada which had been ongoing since early 1999.

The proposed merger was backed by American Airlines, who had already owned a 25% stake in Canadian Airlines, the maximum allowed under Canadian foreign ownership restrictions. Then-American CEO Donald Carty, who had formerly headed Canadian predecessor Canadian Pacific Air Lines, planned to acquire a controlling interest in the enlarged Air Canada, with the purpose of moving it from the Star Alliance to Oneworld alliance. American Airlines was unsuccessfully lobbying Canadian federal government to ease foreign ownership restrictions on Canadian airlines. Afterwards, American sold its shares in Air Canada as the company decided to change its corporate strategy regarding the Canadian aviation market.

Four days later, on August 24, 1999, Onex Corporation announced a takeover bid for Canadian Airlines, backed by American Airlines's parent company AMR Corporation, consisting of $1.8B in cash and the assumption of $3.9B in debt. Canadian Airlines announced that it would support this and recommend acceptance from its shareholders. Air Canada rejected the offer. On August 31, 1999, Air Canada adopted a poison pill aimed at thwarting any takeover bid.

On October 19, 1999, Air Canada, backed by Star Alliance partners Lufthansa, United Airlines and CIBC announced a $930M counter bid to the Onex offer. Air Canada offered $92M for Canadian Airlines and committed to running it as a separate company. On November 2, Air Canada increased its offer to $16 per share to buy back 36.4 percent of the airline.

On November 5, 1999, a Quebec judge ruled that the Onex takeover was illegal, breaking the law that stipulates that no more than 10 percent of the company can be controlled by a single shareholder. Onex subsequently withdrew its offer and Air Canada stated it would proceed with the takeover of Canadian Airlines.

On December 4, the board of directors at Canadian Airlines recommended the $92M merger offer from Air Canada to the shareholders. The offer from Air Canada originally expired at 5pm on December 7, 1999, but Air Canada extended their offer until December 23, 1999. Air Canada officially took control of Canadian Airlines, pending government approval, on December 8, 1999. The Federal Competition Bureau cleared the way for the takeover on December 21, 1999, and Canadian Airlines officially became a subsidiary of Air Canada on December 23, 1999.

Canadian Airlines operated as a subsidiary company through most of 2000. In October 2000, all of Canadian Airlines' systems and employees became fully integrated. With both companies fully integrated, Air Canada began massive cuts to employees starting with the announcement that there would be 3500 cuts in the workforce on December 22, 2000. September 26, 2001 saw an additional 5000 cuts primarily driven from the worldwide impact to the travel sector caused by the 9/11 attacks.

At the time of merger, Canadian Airlines carried over 40% of the domestic share of passengers in Canada. Following the completion of the acquisition, Air Canada controlled over 90% of the domestic share of passengers, and dominated international and US-Canada transborder traffic.

== Internet presence ==
Canadian Airlines has the distinction of being the first airline in the world to have a website on the Internet (www.cdnair.ca). The website was launched in April 1994 and is recognized in the Canadian Internet Handbook 1994 and 1995 editions.

== Destinations ==
This is a list of airports that Canadian Airlines International flew to during the 1980s and 1990s until its purchase.

=== Asia ===
==== East Asia ====
- China
  - Beijing - Beijing Capital International Airport
  - Shanghai - Shanghai Hongqiao International Airport
- Hong Kong
  - Hong Kong International Airport (after 1998)
  - Kai Tak Airport (terminated due to airport closure in 1998)
- Japan
  - Nagoya - Nagoya Komaki Airport
  - Tokyo - Narita International Airport
- Taiwan
  - Taipei - Taoyuan International Airport

==== Southeast Asia ====
- Malaysia
  - Kuala Lumpur
    - Kuala Lumpur International Airport
    - Subang International Airport (before 1998)
- Philippines
  - Manila - Ninoy Aquino International Airport
- Singapore
  - Changi Airport
- Thailand
  - Bangkok - Don Mueang International Airport

=== Europe ===
==== Eastern Europe ====
- Hungary
  - Budapest - Budapest Ferenc Liszt International Airport
- Russia
  - Moscow - Sheremetyevo International Airport

==== Northern Europe ====
- Denmark
  - Copenhagen - Copenhagen Airport
- United Kingdom
  - London
    - Gatwick Airport
    - Heathrow Airport
  - Manchester - Manchester Airport

==== Southern Europe ====
- Italy
  - Milan - Milan Malpensa Airport
  - Rome - Rome Fiumicino Airport

==== Western Europe ====
- France
  - Paris - Charles de Gaulle Airport
- Germany
  - Frankfurt - Frankfurt Airport
  - Munich
    - Munich Airport
    - Munich-Riem Airport (terminated due to airport closure)
- Netherlands
  - Amsterdam - Amsterdam Airport Schiphol
- Switzerland
  - Zurich - Zurich Airport

=== North America ===
==== Canada ====
  - Alberta
    - Calgary - Calgary International Airport (hub)
    - Edmonton
      - Edmonton City Centre Airport (terminated due to airport closure)
      - Edmonton International Airport
    - Fort McMurray - Fort McMurray International Airport
  - British Columbia
    - Campbell River - Campbell River Airport
    - Comox - Comox Airport
    - Kamloops - Kamloops Airport
    - Kelowna - Kelowna International Airport
    - Nanaimo - Nanaimo Airport
    - Penticton - Penticton Regional Airport
    - Prince George - Prince George Airport
    - Prince Rupert - Prince Rupert Airport
    - Sandspit - Sandspit Airport
    - Smithers - Smithers Airport
    - Terrace - Northwest Regional Airport Terrace-Kitimat
    - Vancouver - Vancouver International Airport (hub)
    - Victoria - Victoria International Airport
  - Manitoba
    - Churchill - Churchill Airport
    - Flin Flon - Flin Flon Airport
    - Gillam - Gillam Airport
    - The Pas - The Pas Airport
    - Thompson - Thompson Airport
    - Winnipeg - Winnipeg James Armstrong Richardson International Airport
  - Newfoundland and Labrador
    - Deer Lake - Deer Lake Regional Airport
    - Gander - Gander International Airport
    - Goose Bay - Goose Bay Airport
    - Stephenville - Stephenville International Airport
    - St. John's - St. John's International Airport
    - Wabush - Wabush Airport
  - New Brunswick
    - Charlo - Charlo Airport
    - Fredericton - Greater Fredericton Airport
    - Moncton - Greater Moncton International Airport
    - Saint John - Saint John Airport
  - Northwest Territories
    - Fort Smith - Fort Smith Airport
    - Hay River - Hay River/Merlyn Carter Airport
    - Inuvik - Inuvik (Mike Zubko) Airport
    - Norman Wells - Norman Wells Airport
    - Yellowknife - Yellowknife Airport
  - Nova Scotia
    - Halifax - Halifax Stanfield International Airport
    - Sydney - JA Douglas McCurdy Sydney Airport
  - Nunavut
    - Cambridge Bay - Cambridge Bay Airport
    - Iqaluit - Iqaluit Airport
    - Nanisivik - Nanisivik Airport
    - Rankin Inlet - Rankin Inlet Airport
    - Resolute - Resolute Bay Airport
  - Ontario
    - Kingston - Kingston Norman Rogers Airport
    - London - London International Airport
    - Ottawa - Ottawa Macdonald–Cartier International Airport
    - Sault Ste. Marie - Sault Ste. Marie Airport
    - Sudbury - Sudbury Airport
    - Sarnia - Sarnia Chris Hadfield Airport
    - Thunder Bay - Thunder Bay International Airport
    - Toronto - Toronto Pearson International Airport (hub) (Terminal 3)
    - Windsor - Windsor Airport
  - Quebec
    - Bagotville - Bagotville Airport
    - Baie-Comeau - Baie-Comeau Airport
    - Kuujjuarapik - Kuujjuarapik Airport
    - Kuujjuaq - Kuujjuaq Airport
    - Montreal
      - Montréal–Mirabel International Airport
      - Montréal–Trudeau International Airport (hub)
    - Radisson - La Grande Rivière Airport
    - Sept-Îles - Sept-Îles Airport
    - Val-d'Or - Val-d'Or Airport
  - Saskatchewan
    - Regina - Regina International Airport
    - Saskatoon - John G. Diefenbaker International Airport
  - Prince Edward Island
    - Charlottetown - Charlottetown Airport
  - Yukon
    - Whitehorse - Whitehorse International Airport

==== Mexico ====
  - Mexico City - Mexico City International Airport
  - Monterrey - Monterrey International Airport
  - Puerto Vallarta - Licenciado Gustavo Díaz Ordaz International Airport

==== United States ====
  - Boston - Boston Logan International Airport
  - Chicago - Chicago O'Hare International Airport
  - Dallas/Fort Worth - Dallas/Fort Worth International Airport
  - Erie - Erie International Airport
  - Fort Lauderdale - Fort Lauderdale-Hollywood International Airport
  - Honolulu - Daniel K. Inouye International Airport
  - Las Vegas - Harry Reid International Airport
  - Los Angeles - Los Angeles International Airport
  - Miami - Miami International Airport
  - New York City
    - John F. Kennedy International Airport
    - LaGuardia Airport
  - Orlando - Orlando International Airport
  - San Diego - San Diego International Airport
  - San Francisco - San Francisco International Airport
  - Seattle/Tacoma - Seattle–Tacoma International Airport
  - Washington, D.C. - Washington Dulles International Airport

=== Oceania ===
- Australia
  - Sydney - Sydney Airport
- Fiji
  - Nadi - Nadi International Airport
- New Zealand
  - Auckland - Auckland Airport

=== South America ===
- Argentina
  - Buenos Aires - Ministro Pistarini International Airport
- Brazil
  - Rio de Janeiro - Rio de Janeiro/Galeão International Airport
  - São Paulo - São Paulo/Guarulhos International Airport
- Chile
  - Santiago - Arturo Merino Benítez International Airport
- Peru
  - Lima - Jorge Chávez International Airport

== Livery ==
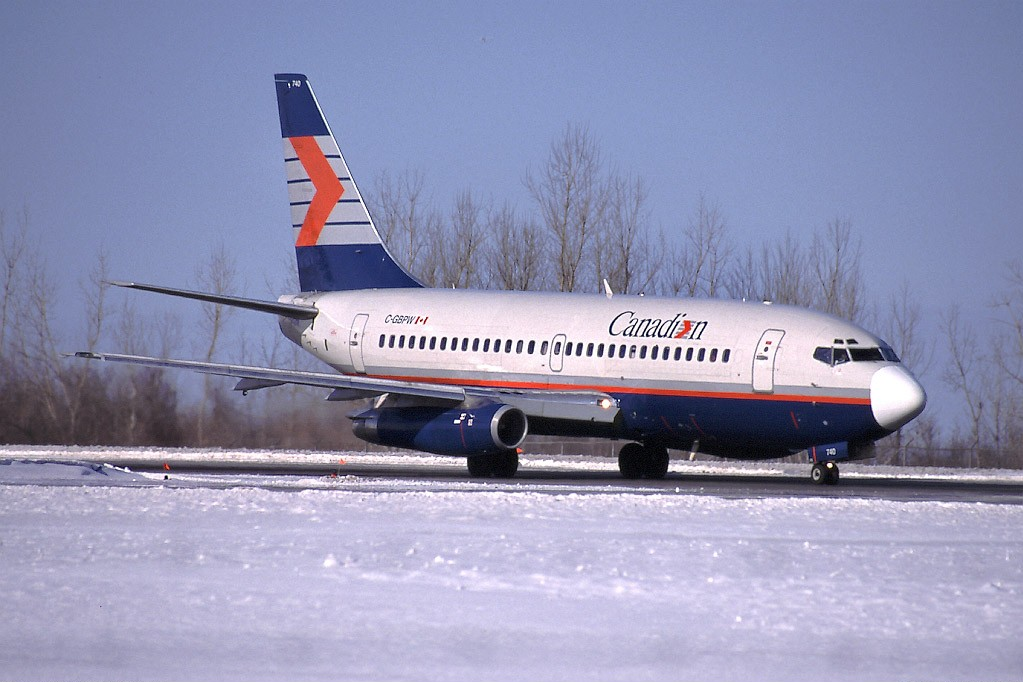
Boeing 737-200 at Ottawa Macdonald–Cartier International Airport in 2001

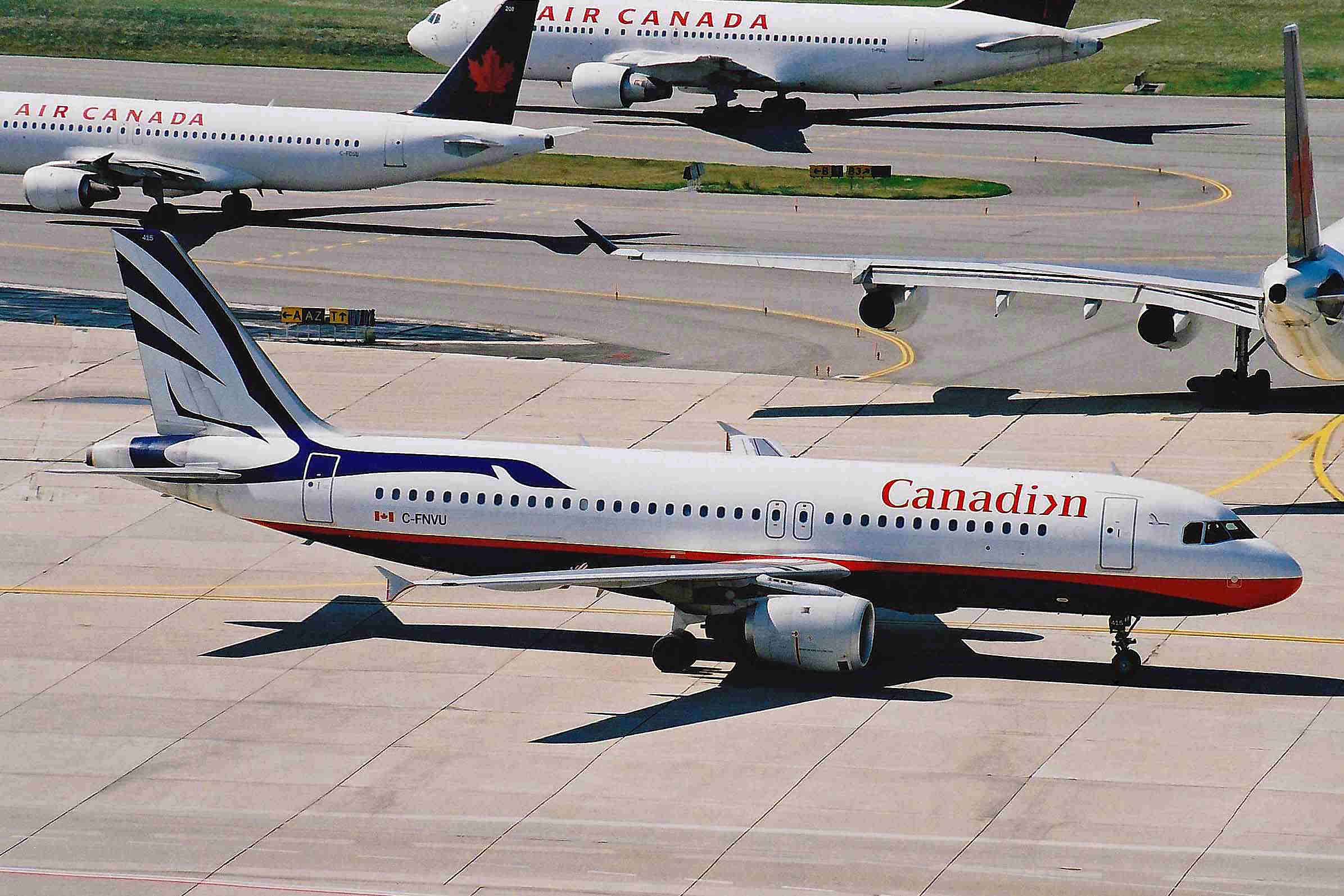
Airbus A320-200

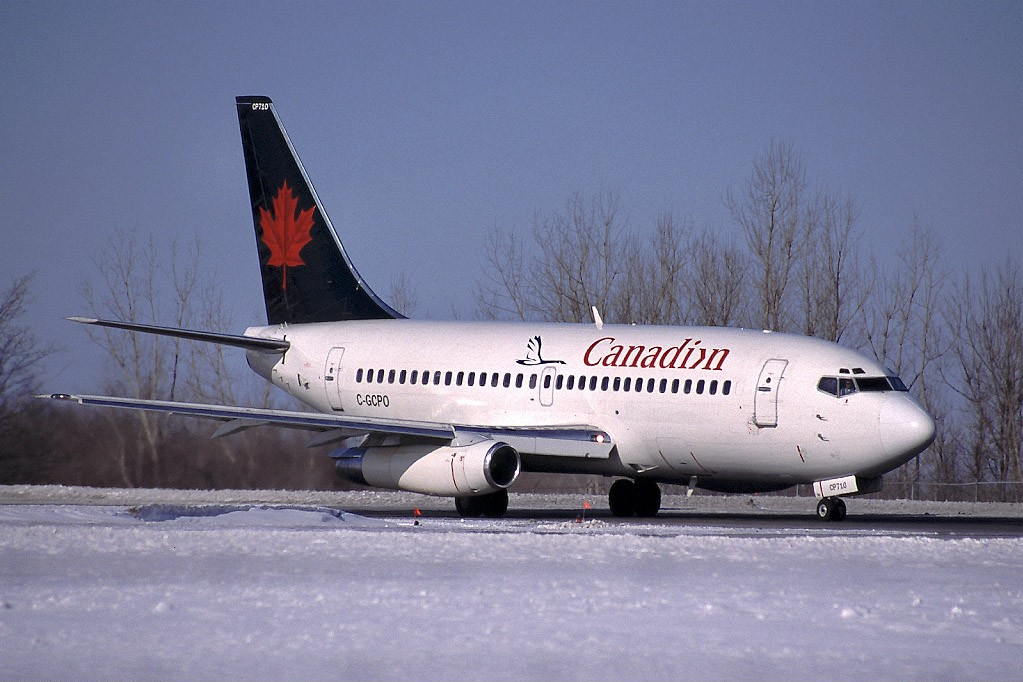
Boeing 737-200 with an Air Canada hybrid livery at Ottawa Macdonald–Cartier International Airport in 2001

Upon its founding in 1987, Canadian Airlines revealed its new livery using the colours light grey, dark grey, navy blue, and red. The paint scheme was an adaptation of the recently introduced livery from predecessor Canadian Pacific Airlines. The lower half of the aircraft's body was navy blue, topped with light grey and red stripes, while the tail was blue, with approximately one third taken up by the carrier's new logo. The new Canadian Airlines logo was a combination of Canadian Pacific's five grey stripes, representing the five continents served by the carrier. Over these stripes was a thick, bright red chevron. The chevron was a simplification of the Pacific Western Airlines logo. The chevron was placed over the stripes, which then represented "Wings over 5 continents".

Canadian adopted a short-lived new livery in January 1999, less than a year before the airline was merged into Air Canada. The livery, known as "Proud Wings", featured a large Canada goose painted at the tail of the aircraft and the airline's name in a new Celeste font. This new font included a new chevron character, to again replace the French "e", and third "a" in English (Canadian/Canadien). The new livery, however, came so late that most of the fleet still retained the existing chevron livery by the time of the merger. Until the merger process with Air Canada was completed in 2001, most Canadian aircraft featured a transition livery with an Air Canada maple leaf on the tail while retaining the name "Canadian" on the fuselage.

== Fleet ==
When Canadian Airlines International was acquired by Air Canada in 2001, its fleet contained these aircraft:

Canadian Airlines international fleet
Aircraft	Total	Orders	Passengers			Notes
Aircraft	Total	Orders	C	Y	Total	Notes
Airbus A320-200	13	—	24	108	132	Fleet was transferred to Air Canada. 1 aircraft remain in service with Air Canada Jetz.
Boeing 737-200/Adv	43	—	12	88	100	All aircraft transferred to Air Canada (or later to Air Canada Tango or Zip) were retired in 2004.
Boeing 737-200/Adv	43	—	—	112	112	All aircraft transferred to Air Canada (or later to Air Canada Tango or Zip) were retired in 2004.
Boeing 747-400	4	—	42	379	421	Fleet was transferred to Air Canada and retired in 2004.
Boeing 767-300ER	23	—	25	180	205	All aircraft transferred to Air Canada (or later to Air Canada Rouge) were retired by 2020. However, certain aircraft re-entered service, and converted into freighters to Air Canada Cargo by 2021.
McDonnell Douglas DC-10-30	14	—	28	228	256	Fleet was not transferred to Air Canada. Sold or retired by completion of merger.
Total	97	—				

=== Historical fleet ===
- Airbus A310-300 (from Wardair, five aircraft sold to Canadian Forces in 1992 and the rest sold to other airlines in the 1990s; replaced by Boeing 767-300ER)
- Airbus A320-200
- Boeing 737-200, 200-ELR and 200-Combi
- Boeing 737-300 (leased only by Canadian Pacific Air at the time of merger, returned to lessor in the late 1980s)
- Boeing 767-300ER
- Boeing 747-400
- McDonnell Douglas DC-10-10 (Operated by Canadian Pacific Air. Leased from United Airlines, returned in 1987)
- McDonnell Douglas DC-10-30

=== Regional fleet ===
Canadian Airlines operated a diverse fleet of turboprops and regional jets through a system of partnerships and codesharing agreements with various regional airlines, some of which later merged to form Canadian Regional Airlines:

Turboprops

- de Havilland Canada DHC-8 (-100 and -300, operated by Time Air and Air Atlantic)
- de Havilland Canada DHC-7 (operated by Time Air)
- de Havilland Canada DHC-6 (operated by Calm Air)
- Short 360 (operated by Time Air and Pacific Coastal Airlines)
- Beechcraft 1900C (operated by Air Georgian as Ontario Regional and Frontier Air Service as Canadian Frontier)
- Beechcraft 1900D (operated by Air Georgian as Ontario Regional)
- Beechcraft 99 (operated by Pacific Coastal Airlines)
- Beechcraft King Air 100 (operated by Frontier Air Service)
- Beechcraft King Air 200 (operated by Pacific Coastal Airlines)
- Grumman G-21 Goose (operated by Pacific Coastal Airlines)
- Saab 340 (operated by Calm Air)
- Hawker Siddeley HS 748 (operated by Calm Air)
- British Aerospace Jetstream 31 (operated by Ontario Express)
- British Aerospace Jetstream 41 (operated by Air Atlantic)
- Embraer EMB 110 Bandeirante (operated by Air Alma)
- Embraer EMB 120 Brasilia (operated by Ontario Express, operated by Air Alma as Air Quebec/Metro)
- ATR-42 (operated by Ontario Express, later transferred to Inter-Canadien)
- Fairchild Swearingen Metroliner (operated by Inter-Canadien)
- Convair 340 (operated by Inter-Canadien)
- Convair 580 (operated by Time Air and Inter-Canadien)
- Convair 640 (operated by Time Air)

Jets

- British Aerospace 146 (-200, operated by Air Atlantic)
- Fokker F28 (-1000, operated by Time Air, Inter-Canadien, and Canadian North)
- Fokker 100 (operated by Inter-Canadien)

== In-flight services ==
Canadian Airlines offered three classes:

- First Class (F)
- Business Class (J)
- Canadian Class (Y)
  - referred to as Economy Class on turboprop aircraft

First Class was available on flights using wide body jets and Business Classes on flights not using regional jets or turboprop aircraft.

In 1987, Canadian Airlines banned smoking on all domestic flights.

=== Food ===
Meals provided on flights within Canada were catered by LSG Sky Chefs and all other flights by local contractors.

=== Maintenance ===
Maintenance was provided by in-house operations during the existence of the airlines. Aircraft would be serviced by other airlines at airports without CA operations.

=== Ground handling ===
Ground handling was provided by in-house operations during the existence of the airlines. Aircraft baggage would be handled by in-house operations and the interior cleaning and lav and potable service, carpet replacement, seat back and seat covered replacement was handled by Canadian Airlines Cleaning department at airports within CA operations.

=== Entertainment ===
Most international and medium haul flights provided both video and audio entertainment. Short haul flights provided audio entertainment only.

=== Newspapers and magazines ===
Newspapers provided in-flight on most aircraft:

- Canadian – the official in-flight magazine of Canadian Airlines
- newspapers – The Globe and Mail, USA Today
- magazines – Maclean's

=== Lounges ===
Canadian lounges were called Empress Lounge and were located at several airports in Canada and abroad:

- Calgary International Airport, Calgary, Alberta
- Blatchford Field, Edmonton, Alberta
- Edmonton International Airport, Edmonton, Alberta
- Robert L. Stanfield Airport, Halifax, Nova Scotia
- Dorval Airport, Montréal, Quebec
- Mirabel Airport, Montréal, Quebec
- Macdonald-Cartier International Airport, Ottawa–Gatineau
- San Francisco International Airport, San Francisco, California, United States
- Toronto Pearson International Airport Terminal 3, Ontario
- Vancouver International Airport, British Columbia
- Ezeiza Airport, Buenos Aires, Argentina
- Mexico City International Airport, Mexico City, Mexico
- Galeão Airport, Rio de Janeiro, Brazil
- Guarulhos Airport, São Paulo, Brazil
- Don Muang Airport Terminal 2, Bangkok, Thailand
- Beijing Capital International Airport, Beijing, China
- Kai Tak Airport, British Hong Kong
- Chek Lap Kok Airport, Hong Kong
- Komaki Airport, Nagoya, Japan
- Taoyuan International Airport, Taipei, Taiwan
- Narita Airport, Tokyo, Japan
- Auckland Airport, Auckland, New Zealand
- Sydney Airport, Sydney, Australia
- Frankfurt Airport, Frankfurt, Germany
- Heathrow Airport, London, England, United Kingdom
- Malpensa Airport, Milan, Italy
- Charles de Gaulle Airport, Paris, France
- Leonardo da Vinci–Fiumicino Airport, Rome, Italy

== Subsidiaries ==
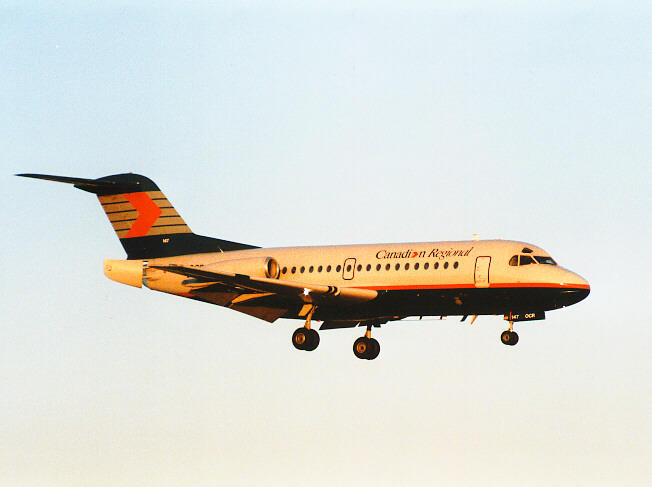
Canadian Regional Airlines Fokker F-28-1000 at Toronto Pearson International Airport in 1998

Canadian Airlines' domestic network was broken down into five divisions:

- Canadian Partner operated by Ontario Express served Ontario province.
- Canadian Regional Airlines, which served 69 destinations in British Columbia, Alberta, Saskatchewan, Manitoba, the Northwest Territories, Ontario, and the United States. Canadian Regional was 100 percent owned by Canadian Airlines. The predecessors of Canadian Regional were Time Air (which operated Canadian Partner service) and Ontario Express.
- Calm Air which served 27 destinations in Manitoba, northwestern Ontario, and the Northwest Territories. Calm Air was 45 percent owned by Canadian Regional and continues to operate under separate management.
- Inter-Canadien served Ottawa, Toronto, Labrador, and 26 destinations throughout Quebec. Inter-Canadien was 100 percent owned by Canadian Regional.
- Air Atlantic, a regional partner of Canadian Airlines, served 16 destinations throughout the Atlantic provinces, Quebec, Ontario, and the United States.
- Canadian North was a division of Canadian Airlines created to serve the northern regions. Canadian North had a network of 10 destinations that expanded from its southern bases of Edmonton and Winnipeg. Canadian North also had a commercial agreement with Aklak Air, an Inuit-owned and operated airline in the Northwest Territories. Canadian North was sold in 1998 to Norterra and continues to operate as an independent airline.

In addition to flight providers, Canadian Airlines operated the largest tour operator in Canada called Canadian Holidays and the Canadian Getaways program. The operator flew to destinations which included destinations throughout North and South America. Their freight operation, Canadian Air Cargo, provided general air cargo services in Canada and the United States.

== Media appearances ==
In 1994, the Canadian Children's show Mighty Machines filmed one of their episodes (Mighty Machines at the Airport) at Toronto Pearson International Airport, starring a couple of Canadian Airlines jets (a McDonnell Douglas DC-10, a Boeing 737-200 and an Airbus A320) and several other of the carrier's vehicles.

In the 1996 film Homeward Bound 2: Lost in San Francisco, the family is flying to Canada on Canadian Airlines when their pets escape. The animals then chase after a Canadian Airlines 737 and lay on the runway as the jet takes off over their heads. Many other Canadian Airlines planes are visible during this scene, including a DC-10 seen taking off as the animals evade airport security. While set at San Francisco International Airport, the scene was actually filmed at Abbotsford International Airport in Abbotsford, British Columbia.

== Accidents and incidents ==
No fatalities occurred on Canadian Airlines International flights. There were only two major incidents:

- On October 19, 1995, Canadian Airlines International Flight 17 rejected takeoff due to compressor stall and subsequently over-ran the end of the runway at Vancouver International Airport.
- On September 6, 1997, Canadian Airlines International Flight 30 aborted takeoff after experiencing an engine fire at Beijing Capital International Airport.
