= Air Atlantic =

Regional airline of Canada (1985–1998)

IATA	ICAO	Call sign
9A	ATL	DASH
- Founded: 1985
- Ceased operations: October 1998
- Hubs: Halifax Stanfield International Airport
- Alliance: CP, AA
- Destinations: 25
- Headquarters: St. John's, Newfoundland and Labrador
- Key people: Craig Dobbin (founder)

Air Atlantic was a Canadian airline, operating a fleet of BAe 146-200, BAe 4100 and Dash 8-100 aircraft.

Founded and majority owned by Craig Dobbin, Air Atlantic was established in 1986 and operated Dash 7 aircraft as an interim solution until delivery of their first Dash 8's. Air Atlantic functioned as a feeder airline for Canadian Pacific Airlines and later Canadian Airlines International throughout Atlantic Canada and offered limited service from that region to Quebec, Ontario and New England. It ceased operations in October 1998.

== Destinations ==
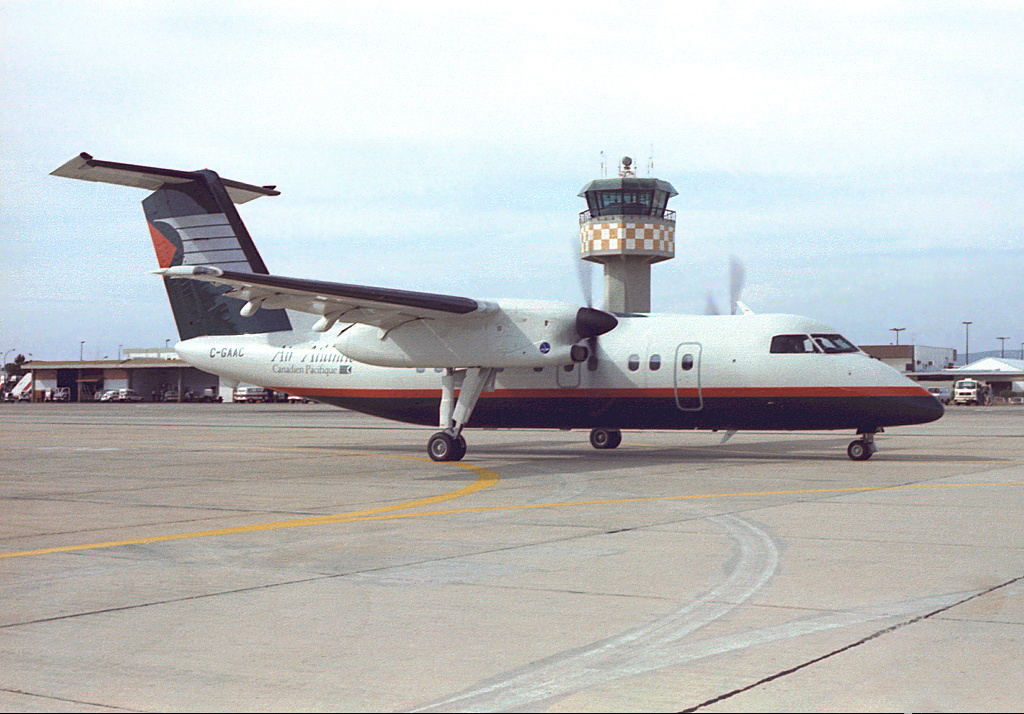
Air Atlantic De Havilland Canada DHC-8-102 at Faro Airport

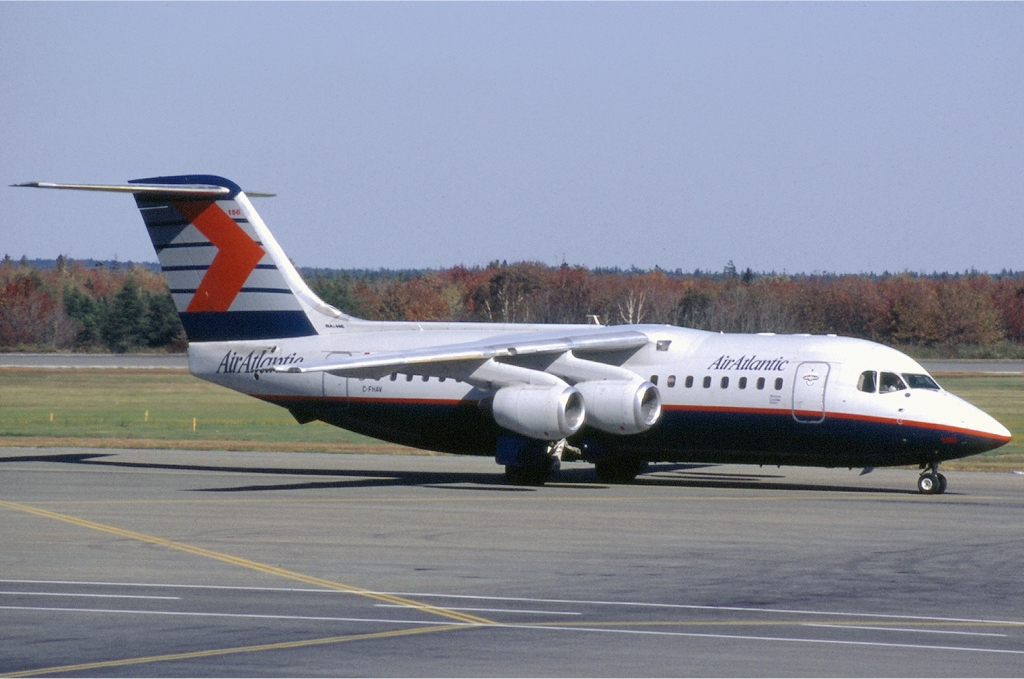
Air Atlantic BAE 146-200

=== Canada ===
- New Brunswick
  - Charlo - Charlo Airport
  - Fredericton - Fredericton International Airport
  - Miramichi - Miramichi Airport
  - Moncton - Greater Moncton International Airport
  - Saint John - Saint John Airport
- Newfoundland and Labrador
  - Churchill Falls - Churchill Falls Airport
  - Deer Lake - Deer Lake Regional Airport
  - Gander - Gander International Airport
  - Goose Bay - CFB Goose Bay
  - Stephenville - Stephenville International Airport
  - St. John's - St. John's International Airport
  - Wabush - Wabush Airport
- Nova Scotia
  - Halifax - Halifax Stanfield International Airport
  - Sydney - Sydney/J.A. Douglas McCurdy Airport
  - Yarmouth - Yarmouth Airport
- Ontario
  - Ottawa - Ottawa Macdonald–Cartier International Airport
  - Toronto - Toronto Pearson International Airport and Buttonville Municipal Airport
- Prince Edward Island
  - Charlottetown - Charlottetown Airport
- Québec
  - Montréal - Montréal–Dorval International Airport
  - Québec City - Québec City Jean Lesage International Airport
  - Iles-de-Madeleine - Îles-de-la-Madeleine Airport

=== United States ===
- Bangor - Bangor International Airport
- Boston - Logan International Airport
- Portland (Maine) - Portland International Jetport

== See also ==
- List of defunct airlines of Canada
