= Air Alliance =

Regional airline of Canada (1987–1999)

Air Alliance Inc.

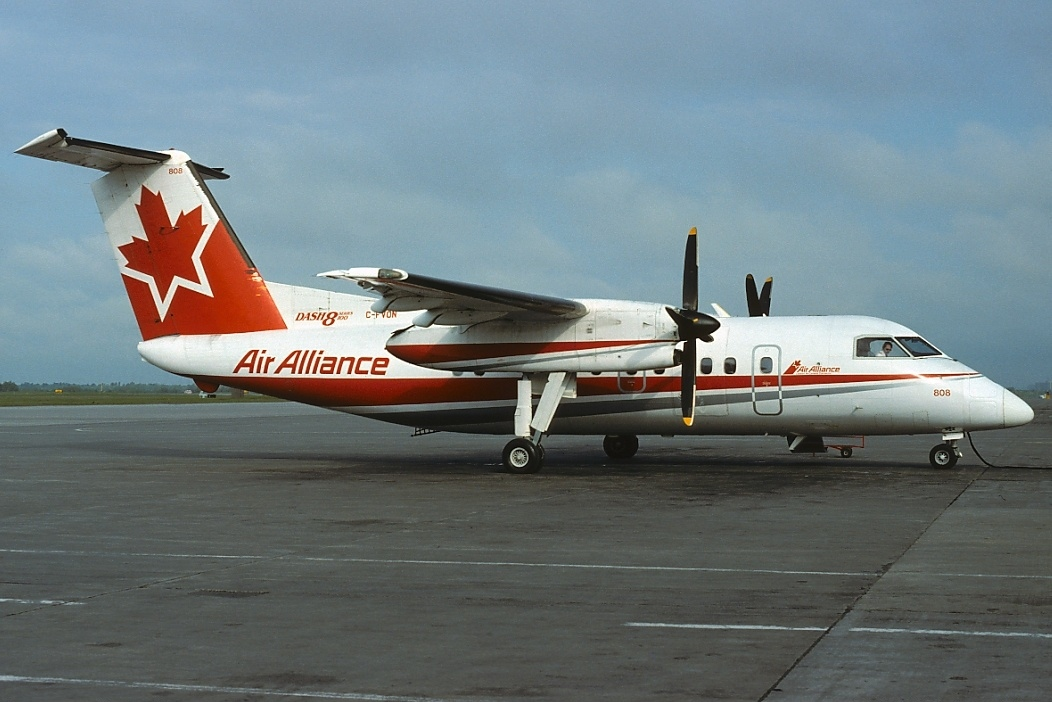
IATA	ICAO	Call sign
3J	AAQ	LIAISON
- Founded: 1987
- Ceased operations: April 5, 1999 (merged into Air Nova)
- Hubs: Québec City Jean Lesage International Airport
- Frequent-flyer program: Aéroplan
- Alliance: Star Alliance (affiliate; 1997–1999)
- Parent company: Air Canada
- Headquarters: Quebec City, Quebec, Canada

Air Alliance was a Canadian regional airline based in Quebec City, Quebec, Canada, which was operational from its formation in 1987 until 1999, when it was absorbed into Air Nova. The brand name Alliance was then used by Air Canada until 2011 to refer to its eastern Tier III operation operated by Air Georgian.

== Fleet ==
Air Alliance operated the following aircraft:

Air Alliance fleet
Aircraft	Total	Introduced	Retired	Notes
Beechcraft 1900D	12	1996	1999	
De Havilland Canada Dash 8-100	18	1988	1999	

== See also ==
- List of defunct airlines of Canada
