= Canadian Regional Airlines =

Regional airline of Canada (1993–2000)

Canadian Regional Airlines Ltd.

- A Canadian Regional Fokker F28 Fellowship
| IATA | ICAO | Call sign |
|---|---|---|
| KI | CDR | CANADIAN REGIONAL |
- Founded: January 1991
- Commenced operations: April 1, 1993 (amalgamation)
- Ceased operations: November 1, 2001 (merged with Air BC, Air Nova and Air Ontario to form Air Canada Jazz)
- Hubs: Calgary International Airport
- Frequent-flyer program: Canadian Plus
- Alliance: Oneworld (affiliate; 1999–2000)
- Subsidiaries: Inter-Canadien (1996–1999)
- Parent company: Canadian Airlines International
- Headquarters: Calgary, Alberta, Canada

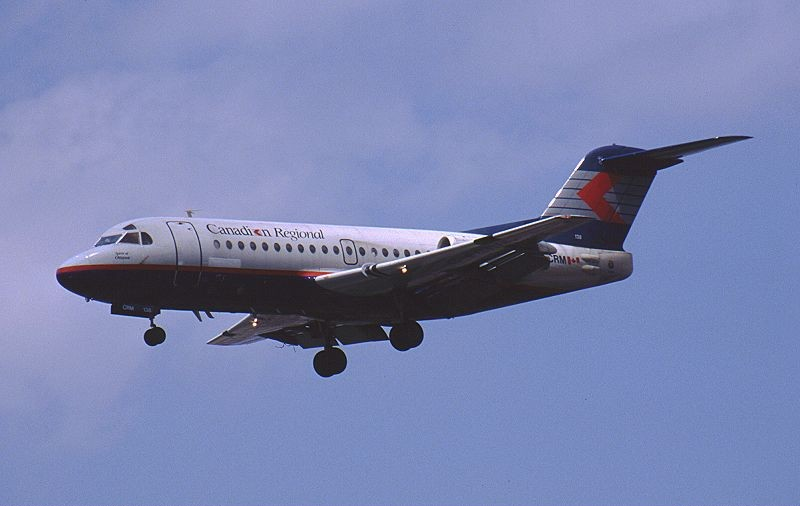
Canadian Regional Fokker F28

Canadian Regional Airlines was a regional airline headquartered in Calgary, Alberta, Canada. It is now part of Air Canada Jazz.

== Accidents and incidents ==
- On February 5, 2001, at Vancouver International Airport, a passenger was severely burned after sulphuric acid leaked from carry-on baggage in an overhead rack on a Canadian Regional Fokker F28 with ten passengers. A second passenger suffered lesser burns after the acid struck both their faces. Six people received medical attention for inhaling fumes.

== See also ==
- List of defunct airlines of Canada
