= St. Pete–Clearwater International Airport =

Third busiest airport serving the Tampa Bay area, Florida, United States

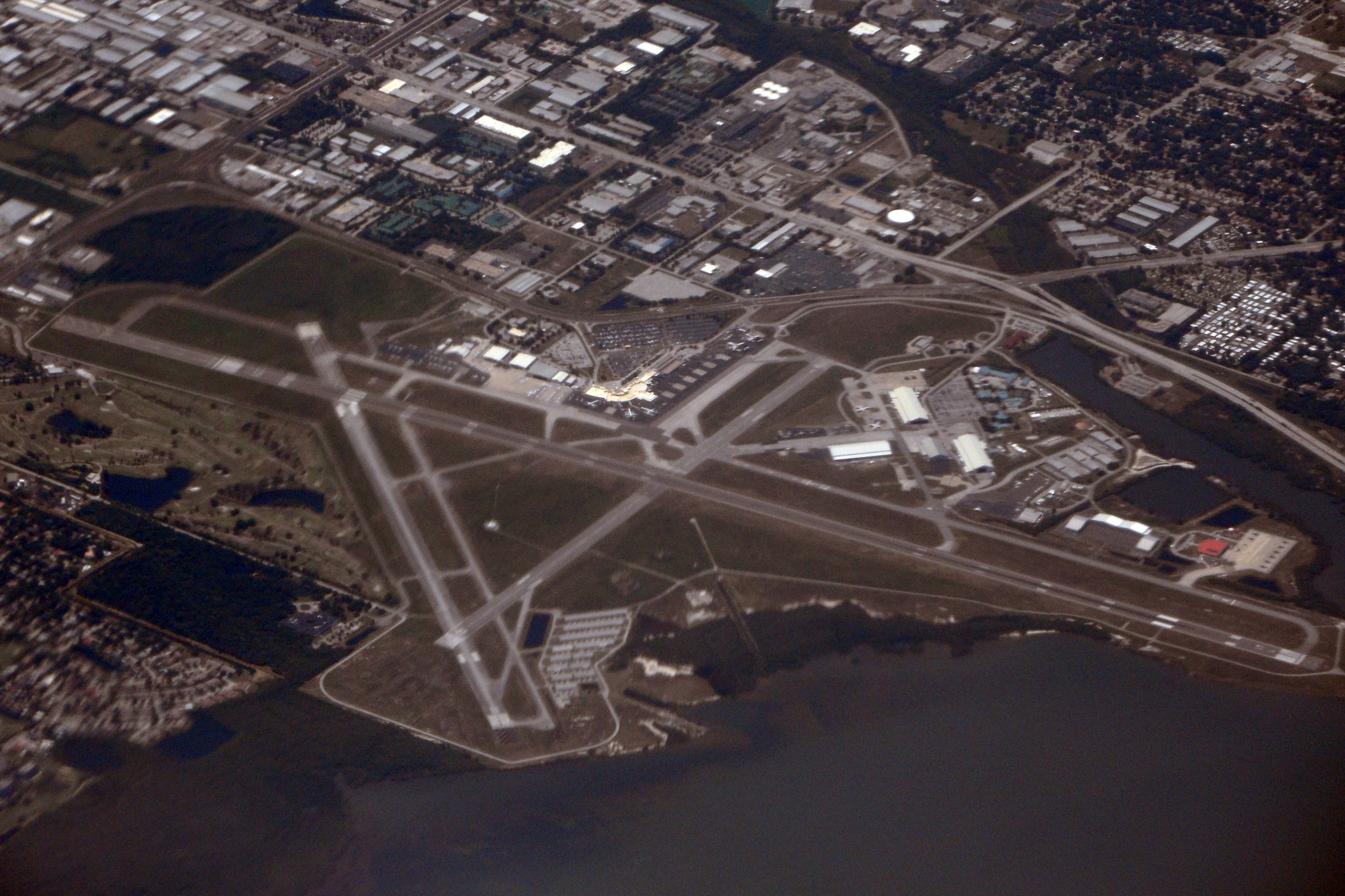
- Aerial view of the airport in 2010
- IATA: PIE; ICAO: KPIE; FAA LID: PIE

Summary
- Airport type: Public
- Owner: Pinellas County
- Serves: Tampa Bay area
- Location: Unincorporated Pinellas County, adjacent to Pinellas Park
- Operating base for: Allegiant Air
- Elevation AMSL: 11 ft (3.4 m)
- Coordinates: 27°54′36″N 82°41′15″W
- Website: fly2pie.com

Maps
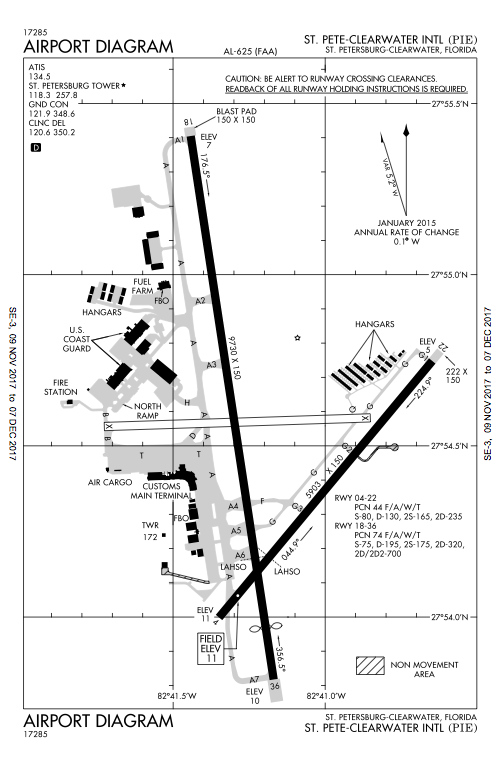
- FAA airport diagram
- Interactive map of St. Pete–Clearwater International Airport

Runways
Direction	Length		Surface
Direction	ft	m	Surface
18/36	9,730	2,966	Asphalt
04/22	6,000	1,829	Asphalt

Statistics (2025)
- Aircraft operations (2024): 175,093
- Passengers: 2,794,067▲13.64%
- Sources: FAA, airport website

St. Pete–Clearwater International Airport (IATA: PIE, ICAO: KPIE, FAA LID: PIE) is a public/military airport in Pinellas County, Florida, United States, serving the Tampa Bay area. It is right on the northeast municipal boundary of Pinellas Park, 9 miles (14 km) north of downtown St. Petersburg, 7 miles (11 km) southeast of Clearwater, and 17 miles (27 km) southwest of Tampa.

The Federal Aviation Administration (FAA) National Plan of Integrated Airport Systems for 2023–2027 categorized it as a small-hub primary commercial service facility. In 2014, it showed double-digit growth and handled more than one million passengers, setting a record.

The airport uses "Tampa Bay The Easy Way" as an advertising slogan and "Fly2PIE" in reference to its three-letter IATA and FAA codes.

== History ==
The airport is on the west shoreline of Tampa Bay, six miles (10 km) north of St. Petersburg, Florida (the "birthplace of commercial air transportation"). Barely a decade after the pioneer flight of the Wright brothers at Kitty Hawk in 1903, the first tickets for airline travel were sold by the St. Petersburg-Tampa Airboat Line of Tony Jannus to fare-paying passengers. Using a Benoist XIV amphibious aircraft, the inaugural flight took place from a location near the downtown St. Petersburg Pier. Mayor Abram C. Pheil of St. Petersburg and Mae Peabody of Dubuque, Iowa, were the first passengers, flying across the bay to Tampa and, according to a United Press account, reportedly reaching the maximum speed of 75 miles per hour (121 km/h) during the flight. Other reports indicate that they reached an altitude of 50 feet (15 m).

This was the beginning of commercial air transportation anywhere in the world and is commemorated by a replica of the Benoist aircraft and a plaque at the airport terminal baggage claim area. Another replica is displayed at the St. Petersburg Museum of History adjacent to the Pier. Since 1991, the terminal holds the archives of the Florida Aviation Historical Society.

=== Construction and wartime ===
Construction of the airport at its present site started in March 1941. After the attack on Pearl Harbor, the airport was acquired by the United States Army Air Forces, which used it as a military flight training base assigned to Third Air Force.

The 304th Fighter Squadron, a combat training unit of the 337th Fighter Group based P-40 Warhawks and, later, P-51 Mustangs at Pinellas Army Airfield (as it was then known) for the duration of World War II. Antisubmarine patrols against German U-boats in the Gulf of Mexico were also flown from the airfield.

To commemorate the airport's vital role during that conflict, a plaque was dedicated at the airport terminal in 1994 by the P-51 Fighter Pilots Association and Brigadier General James H. Howard, who was the only European Theater fighter pilot to be awarded the Medal of Honor in World War II and later served as the last wartime base commander of Pinellas Army Airfield. A permanent exhibit honoring General Howard is located in the terminal.

=== Postwar operation ===
After World War II, the property was returned to Pinellas County by the U.S. government to operate as a civil airport. It was originally called Pinellas International Airport and given the IATA designation, PIE, which it still uses, because PIA was already taken by Peoria International Airport. In 1958, the name was changed to St. Petersburg–Clearwater International Airport because, according to airport manager "Bobo" Hayes, tourists didn't know where Pinellas County was.

The airport was the original home to two of the first scheduled air freight airlines in the United States, U. S. Airlines (dating to 1946) and Aerovias Sud Americana (1947), which was also known as ASA International Airlines. U. S. Airlines had domestic routes to the northern cities, whereas ASA had routes to Latin America. One of ASA's specialities was flying livestock, and consequently the airport had animal pens to allow ASA to assemble the animals they were flying south.

=== Airline service: 1950s to mid-2000s ===
During the 1950s until the mid 1960s, several major U.S. airlines served both St. Petersburg–Clearwater (PIE) and Tampa International Airport (TPA), including Delta Air Lines, Eastern Air Lines, National Airlines and Northwest Airlines. The April 1957 Official Airline Guide lists 17 airline departures from PIE: ten by Eastern, six by National and one by Mackey Airlines. Four departures flew nonstop beyond Florida, including an Eastern Douglas DC-4 to Chicago and a Lockheed L-1049G Super Constellation to Pittsburgh. In 1956, Mackey Airlines Douglas DC-4s flew to Nassau, Bahamas, via Tampa and Fort Lauderdale. In 1959, a National Airlines Douglas DC-7B flew to New York City Idlewild Airport (now JFK Airport) and Boston via Jacksonville. In 1960, Delta was operating "Flying Scot" Douglas DC-6s on a St. Petersburg - Atlanta - Knoxville - Cincinnati - Chicago Midway Airport routing.

With the advent of the jet age, runway 17/35 was extended north into Tampa Bay; the first scheduled jets were Northwest Airlines Boeing 720Bs from Chicago in late 1961 (the 1961 Aviation Week directory says PIE's longest runways were 5,700 feet, but it appears 17/35 was 8,000 feet when the 720B arrived). The increased capacities of Boeing 707 and Douglas DC-8 jets prompted the Civil Aeronautics Board (CAB) to approve consolidation of airline service for the Tampa Bay area at TPA in the early 1960s.

In 1963, Northwest was flying Lockheed L-188 Electra propjet service Miami–Fort Lauderdale–St. Petersburg–Atlanta–Chicago O'Hare–Minneapolis/St. Paul–Fargo, ND–Grand Forks, ND–Winnipeg, Canada. Eastern was the last scheduled airline at PIE during the mid-1960s and it ended flights from the airport in 1964. The year before, Eastern had been operating prop flights from St. Petersburg nonstop to Charlotte, Chicago O'Hare Airport, Cleveland and Louisville as well as direct one-stop service to Columbus, OH, Detroit and Indianapolis.

Scheduled air service returned to PIE in 1972, when Air Florida began intrastate airline flights to Miami and Orlando with Boeing 707s. Air Florida replaced its 707s with Lockheed L-188 Electras out of PIE, and in 1974 was flying nonstop to Miami, Orlando and Tallahassee. According to the Official Airline Guide (OAG), only one airline was serving St. Petersburg in the fall of 1979: regional air carrier Red Carpet Airlines operating Convair 440 prop aircraft five days a week nonstop from Miami and two days a week nonstop from Grand Cayman in the Caribbean. According to the OAG, by 1981 the airport still had only one air carrier operating scheduled passenger service: commuter airline Sun Air operating small Embraer EMB-110 Bandeirante turboprops with one weekday nonstop flight from Miami as well as one weekday nonstop flight from nearby Tampa.

Jet service returned in 1982 with Northeastern International Airways flying Douglas DC-8 nonstop flights to Long Island MacArthur Airport in Islip, New York. By 1983, Northeastern was flying Boeing 727-100 nonstop flights to Fort Lauderdale and New Orleans, in addition to its nonstop service to Islip. Also in 1983, People Express was flying nonstop to New York/Newark Liberty International Airport with Boeing 727-200s, 737-100s and 737-200s. Locally based regional air carrier Atlantic Gulf Airlines was flying Vickers Viscount turboprops nonstop to Miami in 1983, and by 1984 was operating Convair 580 turboprops to Atlanta, Fort Lauderdale, Miami and Tallahassee. By 1984, Northeastern had added nonstop West Palm Beach jet flights as well as direct jet flights to Hartford/Springfield, Kansas City, Las Vegas, Little Rock, Oklahoma City, San Diego and Tulsa. People Express then expanded its flights from the airport, and in 1985 was flying nonstop to Charlotte and New York/Newark as well as operating direct, no change of plane jet service to Boston, Detroit and Syracuse. Also in 1985, Florida Express British Aircraft Corporation BAC One-Eleven jets were serving PIE with four daily nonstops to its Orlando hub with direct flights to Columbus, OH, Fort Lauderdale, Indianapolis and Nashville via Orlando. In 1987, American Airlines initiated nonstop mainline jet flights to its Raleigh-Durham hub while Midway Airlines (1976-1991) commenced nonstop Boeing 737-200 jet flights in 1988 from its Chicago Midway Airport hub with direct one stop service from Cleveland; however, by October 1989 PIE once again had no scheduled airline service.

American Trans Air (ATA) and Air South began jet flights from PIE in the 1990s. In the fall of 1991, American Trans Air was the only airline serving the airport with just three nonstop Boeing 727 flights a week from Indianapolis. By early 1994, ATA was operating nonstop Boeing 757-200s from Chicago Midway Airport, nonstop Boeing 727-200s from Indianapolis, nonstop Boeing 727-200s from Milwaukee and weekly nonstop wide body Lockheed L-1011 TriStars from Philadelphia. By late 1994, American Trans Air had expanded its service and was operating domestic nonstop service to Fort Lauderdale and St. Louis as well as international nonstop flights to Nassau, Bahamas, in addition to its flights to Chicago Midway, Indianapolis and Milwaukee. ATA was primarily operating Boeing 727-200 jets on these services in late 1994 but was also operating larger Boeing 757-200 jetliners on some nonstop flights between the airport and Chicago Midway at this time as well. In the summer of 1995, Air South was flying nonstop Boeing 737-200 jet service to Atlanta, Columbia, SC, Miami and Tallahassee. The Air South service to Miami in 1995 included up to five 737 nonstops on weekdays while at the same time commuter air carrier Gulfstream International Airlines was operating twice daily nonstop flights to Miami with small Beechcraft 1900C turboprops. In 1997, Reno Air was operating "Gulf Coast Flyer" service nonstop to Gulfport/Biloxi with McDonnell Douglas MD-80s. By 1999, the OAG listed four airlines operating jets to St. Petersburg: American Trans Air Boeing 727-200 nonstops from Chicago Midway Airport and Indianapolis, Canada 3000 Airbus A320 nonstops from Toronto, Nations Air Boeing 737-200 nonstops from Gulfport/Biloxi and Royal Aviation Boeing 757-200 nonstops from Toronto. Also in 1999, Air Transat, a Canadian-based scheduled and charter airline, was operating wide body Lockheed L-1011 TriStar jets on its flights into the airport. In the late spring of 2004, Southeast Airlines was operating nonstop McDonnell Douglas DC-9-30 jet service from the airport to Allentown, PA (ABE), Columbus, OH (LCK), Gary, IN (GYY), and Newburgh, NY (SWF). Southeast Airlines went out of business in the fall of 2004, while Air South had previously ceased serving the airport back in 1996, and subsequently went out of business as well.

According to the Official Airline Guide (OAG), five airlines were operating jet service into the airport in the spring of 2005 including two U.S.-based air carriers and three Canadian-based air carriers with ATA Airlines (formerly American Trans Air) operating Boeing 757-200 as well as Boeing 757-300 nonstop flights from Chicago Midway Airport (MDW) and Indianapolis (IND), CanJet operating nonstop Boeing 737-500 flights from Halifax, Nova Scotia (YHZ) and Hamilton, Ontario (YHM), Jetsgo operating Fokker 100 as well as McDonnell Douglas MD-83 nonstop flights from Toronto (YYZ), Skyservice Airlines operating nonstop Airbus A320 flights also from Toronto (YYZ), and USA 3000 Airlines operating nonstop Airbus A320 flights from Chicago O'Hare Airport (ORD), Cleveland (CLE), Detroit (DTW), New York Newark Airport (EWR), Philadelphia (PHL), Pittsburgh (PIT) and St. Louis (STL).

=== Recent developments ===
In September 2006, Allegiant Air announced scheduled service from St. Petersburg–Clearwater to cities in Iowa, Illinois, Indiana, Michigan, Missouri, New York, Ohio, Pennsylvania, South Carolina, Tennessee, and Virginia. Allegiant's destination count from PIE has since increased to 59 airports in the eastern United States. In February, the Lansing, Michigan service shifted to Grand Rapids, Michigan, with four weekly flights. Allegiant operates Airbus A319 and A320 jets on its flights from the airport.

In 2009, the airport completed a US$22 million renovation, including, among other things, larger gates, new plumbing, and building passenger jet bridges.

In January 2015, Silver Airways announced it was beginning service to PIE, but in March the company had cancelled its plans.

As of 2021, the airport is planning to convert decommissioned runway 9/27 into a taxiway to enhance service for air carriers, the U.S. Coast Guard, and Pinellas County Sheriff's Office aircraft.

== Facilities ==
The airport covers 1900 acres (769 ha) at an elevation of 11 feet (3 m). It has two asphalt runways: 18/36 is 9,730 by 150 feet (2,966 x 46 m) with an ILS approach, and 04/22 is 6,000 by 150 feet (1,829 x 46 m).

The airport is also the home of Coast Guard Air Station Clearwater, the largest and busiest U.S. Coast Guard Air Station in the United States, operating HC-27J Spartan and MH-60T Jayhawk aircraft.

The U.S. Army Reserve formerly maintained an Army Aviation Support Facility (AASF) at PIE immediately west of the approach end of Runway 18 for Companies A and F, 5th Battalion, 159th Aviation Regiment and Medical Evacuation Unit, operating UH-60 Black Hawk helicopters. The companies and their helicopters relocated to a new Army Aviation Support Facility at MacDill Air Force Base in Tampa, which officially opened in April 2022.

U.S. Customs and Border Protection, the Federal Aviation Administration (FAA)-operated control tower, the FAA's Central Florida Region Automated Flight Service Station (AFSS) (which is the busiest AFSS in the United States) and the St. Petersburg VORTAC for airways navigation are also important federal government services at the airport.

The entire tract of the airport is designated as a Foreign Trade Zone (FTZ) and a large Airport Industrial Park developed in the 1980s is a major center of commerce. The airport and its tenants employ over 3,000 people and have an economic benefit of more than $400 million yearly to the Tampa Bay area.

The airport has a 24-hour airport rescue and fire-fighting (ARFF) department (Index C), along with operations, facilities, engineering, security, and administrative personnel.

== Events ==
Aside from the year of the COVID-19 pandemic, St. Petersburg–Clearwater International Airport serves as the base for the Honor Flight of West Central Florida. American veterans partake in a flight to Washington D.C. annually to visit memorials dedicated to individuals who fought for the United States in various wars. About 75 to 80 veterans participate in the program annually which is designed to fly older veterans who typically could not visit Washington, D.C., otherwise.

== Terminals ==
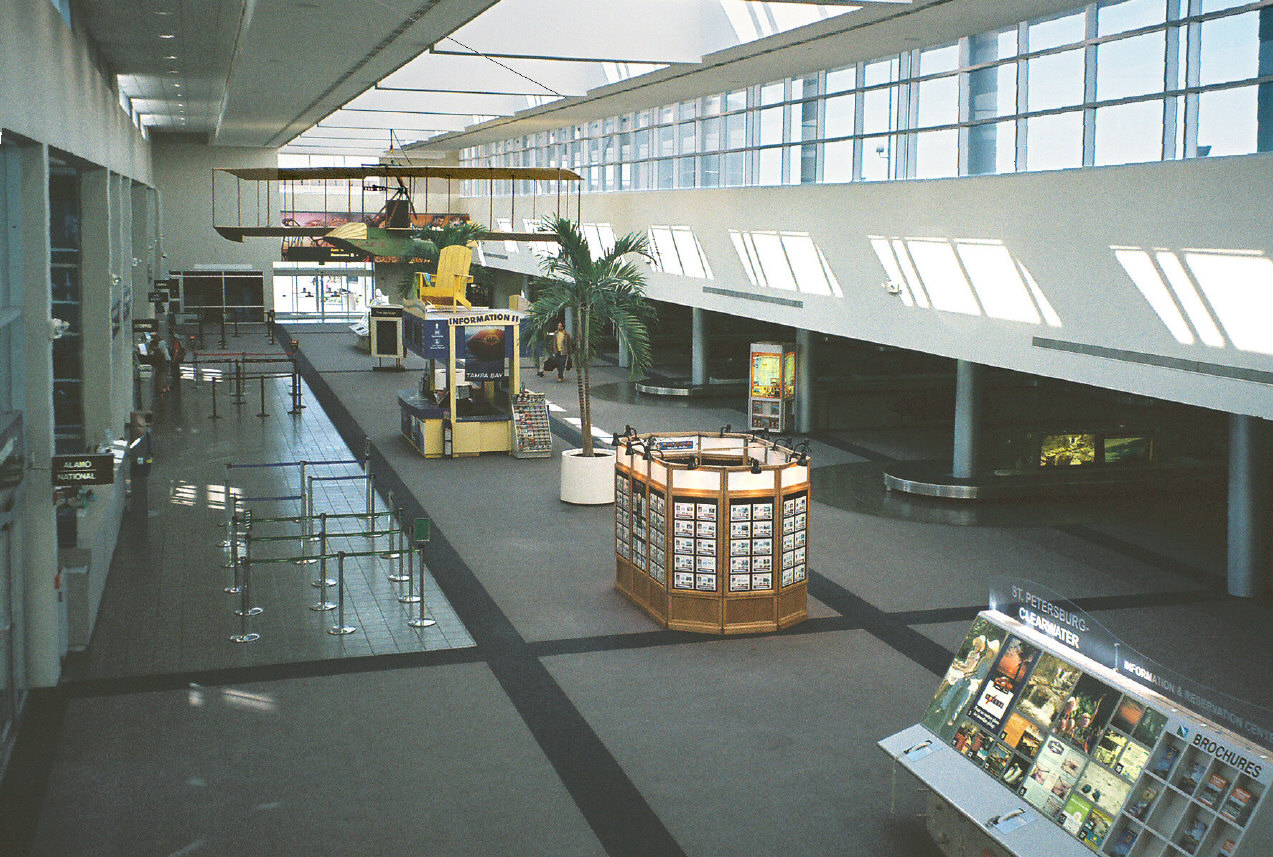
Baggage-claim area, with replica of Benoist XIV flying boat flown by aviation pioneer Tony Jannus in 1914 (2009 photo)

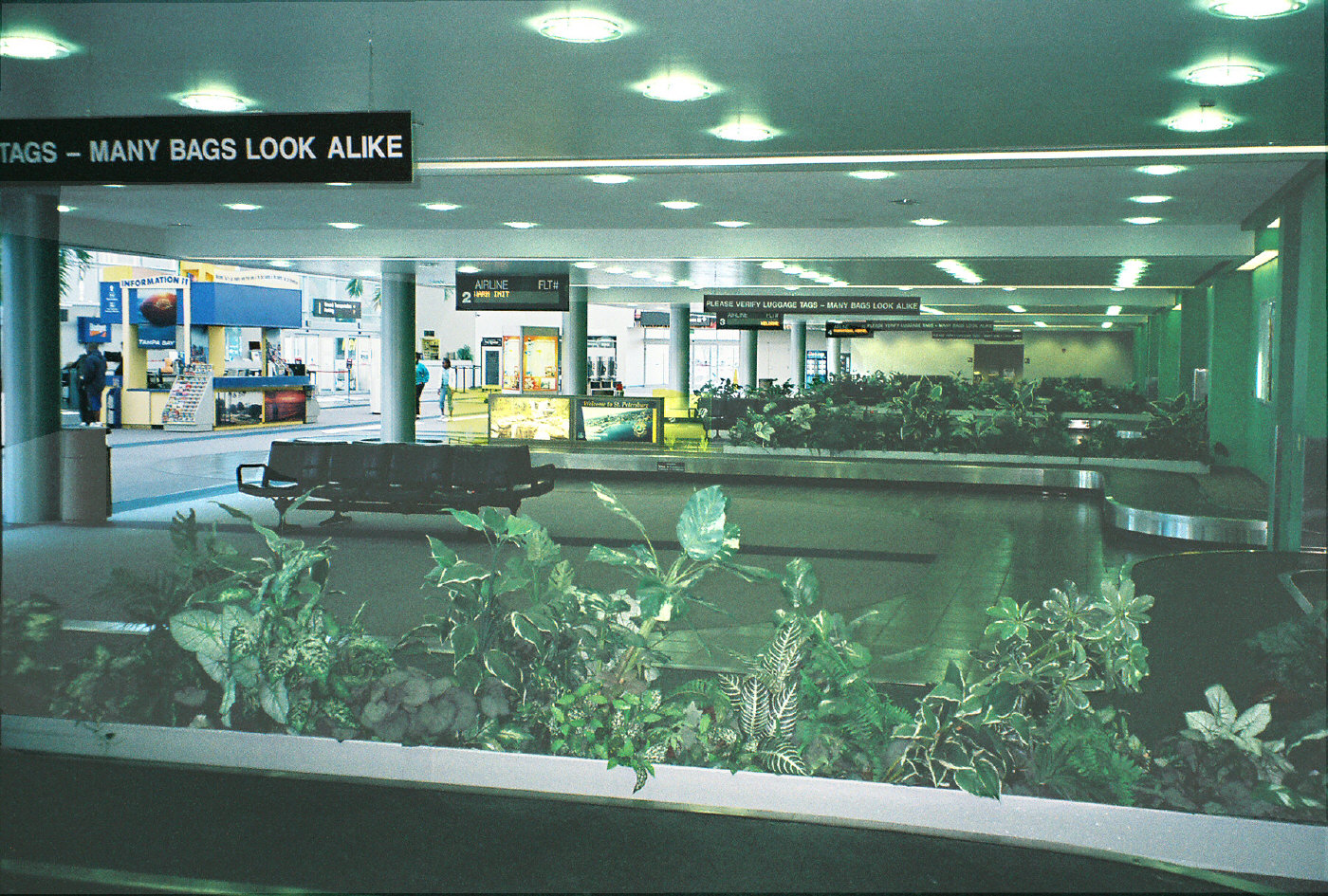
PIE's baggage-claim area has four baggage carousels (2009 photo).

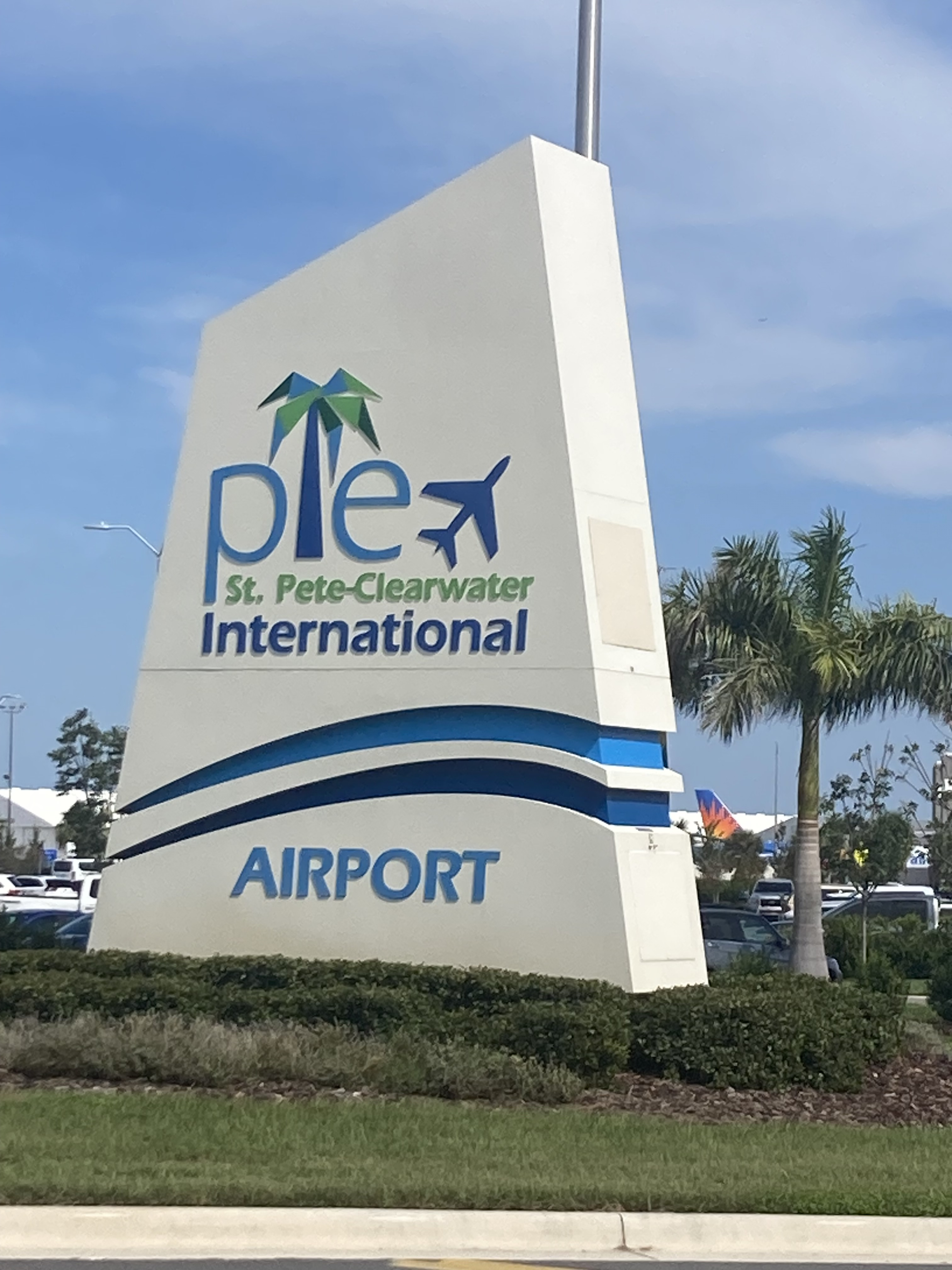
PIE Airport Sign

St. Petersburg–Clearwater International Airport has one terminal with two gate areas, known as A-Side & B-Side. A-Side has gates 1-6 and B-Side has gates 7-12. Gates 1 & 12 are Arrivals Only gates, with gate 1 exiting into the Ticketing A lobby and gate 12 exiting into the baggage claim.

== Airlines and destinations ==
Airlines	Destinations
Allegiant Air	Akron/Canton, Albany (NY), Allentown, Appleton, Asheville, Atlantic City, Bangor, Belleville/St. Louis, Bloomington/Normal, Cedar Rapids/Iowa City, Charlotte/Concord, Chattanooga, Chicago/Rockford, Cincinnati, Clarksburg, Colorado Springs, Columbia (MO), Columbus–Rickenbacker, Dayton, Des Moines, Elmira, Evansville, Fayetteville/Bentonville, Flint, Fort Wayne, Grand Rapids, Greensboro, Greenville/Spartanburg, Hagerstown, Harrisburg, Huntington, Huntsville, Indianapolis, Kansas City, Key West, Knoxville, Lexington, Louisville, Memphis, Moline/Quad Cities, Nashville, Newburgh, Niagara Falls, Omaha, Peoria, Philadelphia, Pittsburgh, Plattsburgh, Richmond, Roanoke, Sioux Falls, South Bend, Springfield/Branson, Syracuse, Toledo, Traverse City, Trenton; Seasonal: Boston (begins February 13, 2027), Fargo, Little Rock, Portsmouth, Tri-Cities (TN)
BermudAir	Seasonal: Anguilla (begins December 24, 2026), Belize City (begins December 20, 2026), Providenciales (begins December 21, 2026)
Sun Country Airlines	Seasonal: Minneapolis/St. Paul

== Statistics ==
Airline Market Share (September 2025 – August 2026)
Rank	Carrier	Passengers	Market Share
1	Allegiant	2,730,000	99.43%
2	Sun Country	15,720	0.57%

=== Top destinations ===
Top domestic destinations (September 2025 – August 2026)
Rank	City	Passengers	Carriers
1	Knoxville, Tennessee	76,580	Allegiant
2	Asheville, North Carolina	76,350	Allegiant
3	Grand Rapids, Michigan	61,920	Allegiant
4	Cincinnati, Ohio	57,060	Allegiant
5	Allentown, Pennsylvania	46,000	Allegiant
6	Flint, Michigan	43,460	Allegiant
7	Indianapolis, Indiana	36,430	Allegiant
8	Charlotte-Concord, North Carolina	32,240	Allegiant
9	Bangor, Maine	31,110	Allegiant
10	Fort Wayne, Indiana	29,090	Allegiant

=== Annual traffic ===
Annual passenger traffic (enplaned + deplaned) at St Pete–Clearwater Airport, 2022 thru Present
Year	Passengers	Year	Passengers	Year	Passengers
2004	1,333,069	2014	1,247,987	2024	2,458,674
2005	596,510	2015	1,645,402	2025	2,794,067
2006	389,997	2016	1,837,035	2026	
2007	747,369	2017	2,055,269	2027	
2008	742,380	2018	2,237,446	2028	
2009	776,535	2019	2,288,692	2029	
2010	776,087	2020	1,394,573	2030	
2011	833,068	2021	2,036,251	2031	
2012	865,942	2022	2,445,919	2032	
2013	1,017,049	2023	2,494,952	2033	

== Accidents and incidents ==
- On January 10, 1955, National Airlines Flight 1 (Lockheed Lodestar N33369) was departing the airport for Sarasota when the copilot lost directional control and the pilot was unable to regain control of the aircraft. The plane ended up in a sodded area off of the runway and all 13 onboard safely evacuated; the plane was damaged beyond repair.
- On May 30, 1969, a USAF Lockheed C-130E Hercules (AF Ser. No. 62-1831) was damaged beyond repair in a ground incident.
- On June 6, 1982, a Douglas C-47 (N95C) owned by Fromhagen Aviation crashed during a training flight; all 5 onboard survived but the aircraft was destroyed. The copilot had never flown a DC-3 before.
- On September 30, 2015, the pilot of a Piper PA-30, registered to Jet Aircraft Management, crashed and died while practicing takeoffs and landings.
- On January 4, 2016, a Beechcraft 200 Super King Air (N275X) of Skyway Aircraft Inc. was being flown from Albert Whitted to PIE for flap examination when the pilot failed to configure the landing gear, resulting in a gear-up landing. The plane was written off due to substantial damage; the pilot survived.

== See also ==
- Coast Guard Air Station Clearwater
- List of airports in Florida
- Pinellas Army Air Field
