= GWY =

GWY may refer to:

- Galway Airport, in Ireland
- Glen Waverley railway station, in Melbourne, Australia
- River Wye (Welsh: Afon Gwy)
- USA3000 Airlines, a defunct American passenger airline

== See also ==
- Cherokee language, in Cherokee syllabics: ᏣᎳᎩ
