= Royal Aviation Company =

Royal Aviation Company may refer to:

- KLM, The Netherlands
- Royal Aviation, Canada
- Royal Aviation Company KSCC, subsidiary of Kuwait Airways
