= Michel Leblanc =

Canadian businessman

Michel Leblanc is a Canadian entrepreneur responsible for starting up seven airlines in 20 years, including Royal Aviation (sold to Canada 3000 in 2001 and bankrupt soon after) and Jetsgo (2002–2005).
