= CanJet =

Low-cost airline of Canada (2002–2015)

IATA	ICAO	Call sign
C6	CJA	CANJET
- Founded: June 20, 2002
- Ceased operations: September 1, 2015
- Operating bases: Halifax; Toronto–Pearson; Vancouver
- Fleet size: 6
- Destinations: 37
- Parent company: IMP Group International
- Headquarters: Enfield, Nova Scotia, Canada
- Key people: Kenneth C. Rowe (CEO)
- Website: canjet.com

CanJet was a Canadian low-cost airline headquartered in Enfield, Nova Scotia and based at Halifax Stanfield International Airport. In addition to initially flying scheduled passenger service, CanJet operated air charter flights using its own brand as well as flying contract and ad hoc charters for other tour operators and airlines throughout Canada and the United States. CanJet was wholly owned by IMP Group International and had 572 employees as of March 2007. The airline ceased operations in 2015.

== History ==
=== Before the merger with Canada 3000 ===
The airline was established in 1999 and started operations on September 5, 2000. It was launched as a division of IMP Group and merged with Canada 3000 in May 2001 shortly before Canada 3000's bankruptcy.

=== Scheduled operations from 2002-2006 ===
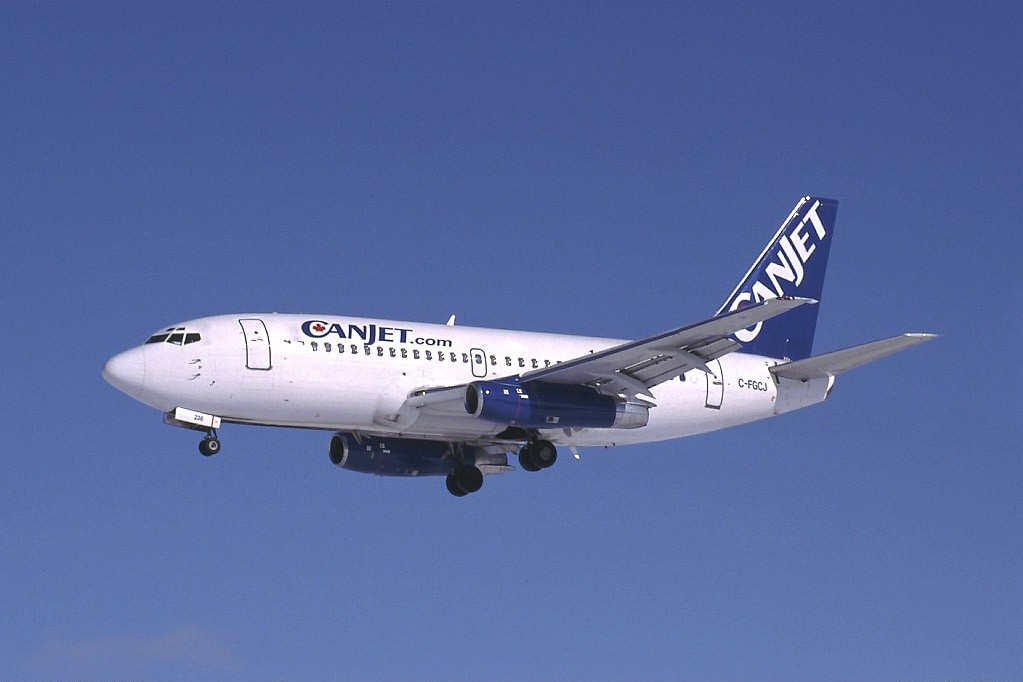
A former CanJet Boeing 737-200

CanJet was relaunched on June 20, 2002, as an independent airline. The relaunched airline flew to three destinations, but quickly expanded. Canjet operated a fleet of nine Boeing 737-500 — seven of which were previously operated by United Airlines and one by Sabena — and one Boeing 737-300. These airframes date back to the early 1990s. There were plans to expand the airline's fleet of Boeing 737-500 aircraft to 20 by 2006; however, the plans were not realized.

In April 2004, CanJet launched services at Hamilton/John C. Munro International Airport, Hamilton to fill a void left after WestJet shifted its eastern Canada hub to Toronto Pearson International Airport.

In May 2005, the company began to expand into the western Canadian market with a flight between Calgary and Toronto, with plans to slowly expand to other western markets. In the wake of the bankruptcy of Jetsgo, the company hoped to fill some of that company's market share, and hoped to expand slowly to avoid the fate of other companies such as Canada 3000. In June 2005, two weeks after Air Canada Jazz announced new service to Hamilton/John C. Munro International Airport from Montreal and Ottawa, CanJet announced it would end its service to Hamilton. In August 2005, CanJet announced new service to Fort Lauderdale, Florida from Toronto.

In May 2006, CanJet and Harmony Airways signed a marketing pact to allow greater cross country service. CanJet would end flights west of Toronto, and focus more on Atlantic flights. This pact allowed consumers to book flights with both companies and have their luggage transferred between the two airlines.

=== Charter operations since 2006 ===
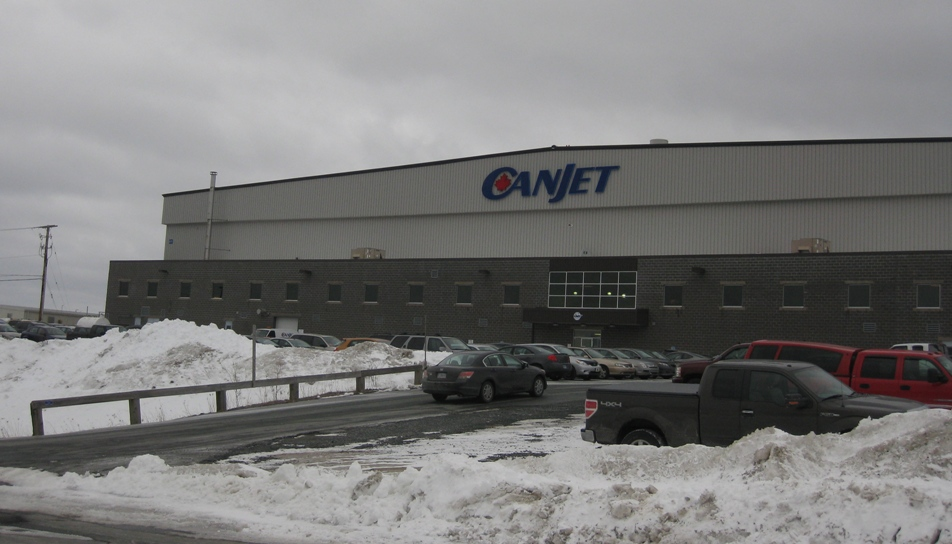
Headquarters of CanJet in Enfield

On September 5, 2006, CanJet announced that on September 10, 2006, it would cancel all regularly scheduled services and focus instead on charter service because of the highly competitive nature of the airline industry in Canada, and the resulting slim profit margins. Ken Rowe, IMP Chairman and CEO, said, "with the rising business risks of operating a scheduled airline, IMP has decided to suspend year-round scheduled airline service and focus on their increasing charter business." CanJet stated that any passengers who had bought tickets for travel dates after September 10, 2006, would be provided a full refund, or alternative travel arrangements. Before the announcement, CanJet had been operating scheduled services and served 15 cities in Canada and the United States.

On September 27, 2006, CanJet announced that it would rehire more than 100 airline pilots and flight attendants; about 20% of the number laid-off on September 10, 2006, as the company regained a contract to fly chartered flights for tour operator, Sunquest.

On February 13, 2009, CanJet announced a five-year partnership with Montreal based Transat AT. Since 1 May 2009, Transat Tours Canada has chartered CanJet's Boeing 737 aircraft flying from Canadian cities to various destinations. This replaced an agreement with Calgary-based WestJet.

In 2014, CanJet started to sell holiday packages branded CanJet Vacations in addition to its charter activities.

On April 14, 2015, the company laid off approximately half of its flight staff and eliminated its planned summer European operations. It also planned to park five of its six aircraft in the wake of the termination of the cooperation with Air Transat and the insufficient sales of holiday packages. A few weeks later the shut down of its CanJet Vacations holiday package operations was announced after 10 months of service due to much lower demand than expected.

On September 1, 2015, CanJet announced that it was ceasing flight operations indefinitely and effective immediately. Its corporate website www.canjet.com is no longer in operation.

== Fleet ==
=== Fleet at closing ===
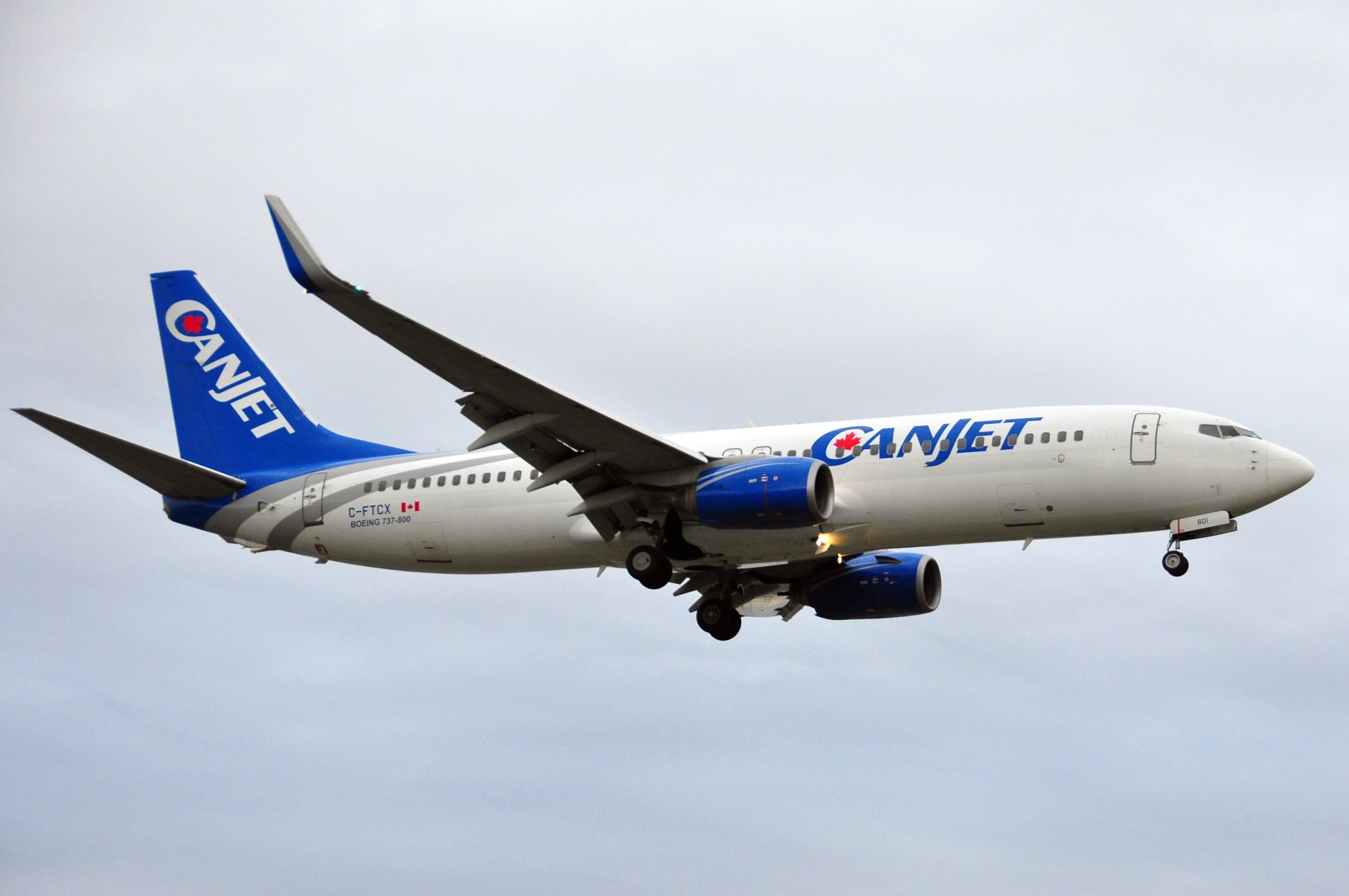
CanJet Boeing 737-800

As of December 2014, the CanJet fleet consisted of the following aircraft:

CanJet fleet
Aircraft	In fleet	Passengers	Notes
Boeing 737-800	6	189	3 were planned to be stored

=== Historical fleet ===
CanJet has also operated the following aircraft types:

CanJet fleet development
Aircraft	Introduced	Retired
Boeing 737-200	2000	2005
Boeing 737-300	2006	2010
Boeing 737-500	2004	2008

== Onboard service ==
CanJet provided free hot meals on all flights (except USA flights) with a free glass of wine, non-alcoholic beverages, coffee and tea on all flights. Pizza and sandwiches were available for purchase on USA flights, with free non-alcoholic beverages, coffee and tea. Snacks and alcoholic beverages were available for sale. On southbound flights, a free glass of sparkling wine was provided on board. Pillow & blanket comfort travel kits, and headsets for in-flight entertainment were available for purchase on board.

== Incidents and accidents ==
- On April 19, 2009, CanJet Flight 918 was taken over by an armed man who slipped through security checks at Sangster International Airport, Montego Bay, Jamaica. All passengers were released early on, but six CanJet crew members were kept as hostages for several hours. The hostages were eventually rescued by Jamaican Police, who successfully stormed the aircraft, following negotiations that involved Jamaican Prime Minister Bruce Golding.

== See also ==
- List of defunct airlines of Canada
