= CanJet Flight 918 =

2009 attempted airliner hijacking

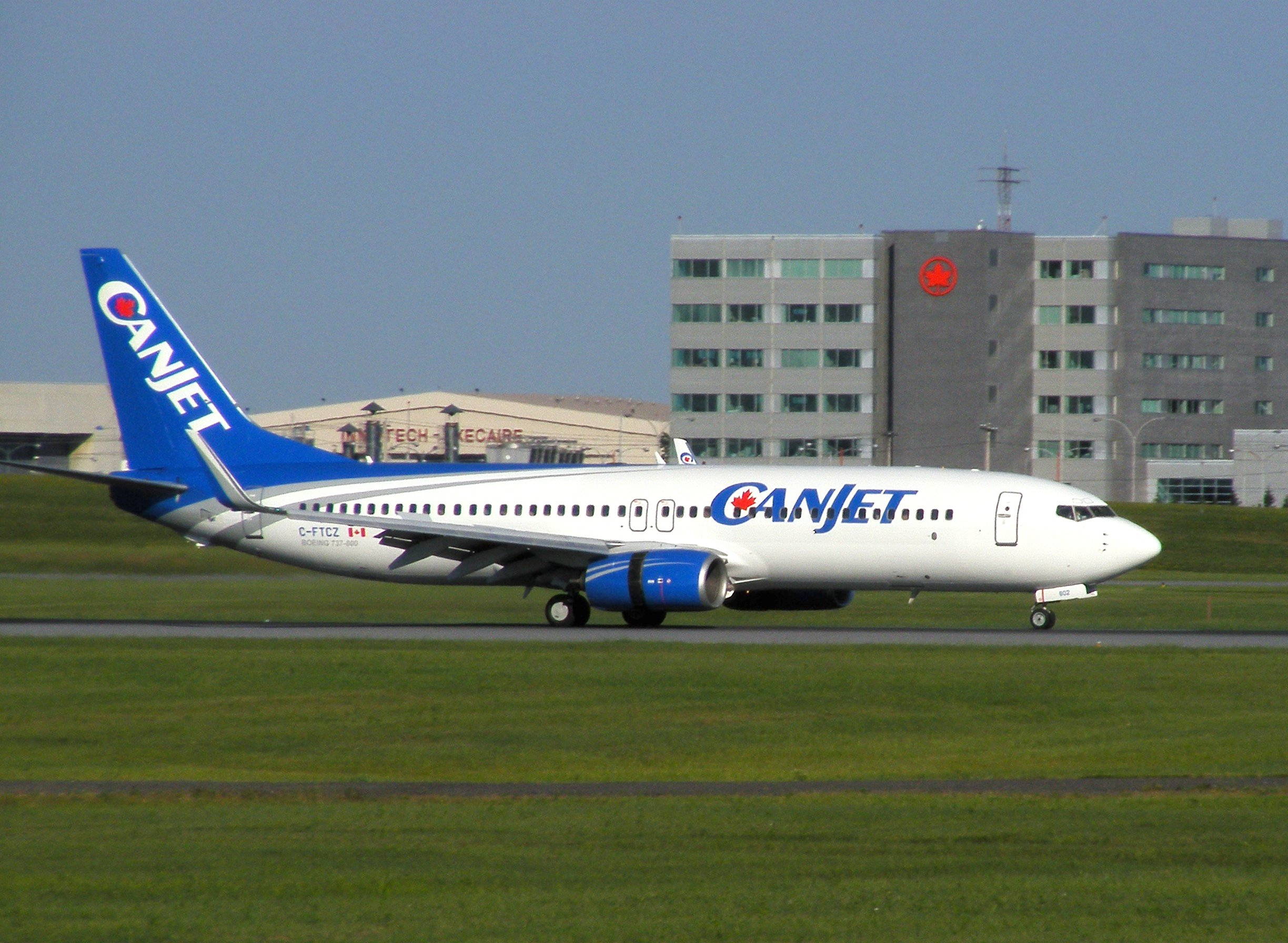
- C-FTCZ, the aircraft involved in the incident

Hijacking
- Date: 19 April 2009
- Summary: Attempted hijacking
- Site: Sangster International Airport, Montego Bay, Jamaica; 18.4999°N 77.9164°W

Aircraft
- Aircraft type: Boeing 737-8AS
- Operator: CanJet
- Registration: C-FTCZ
- Flight origin: Sangster International Airport, Montego Bay, Jamaica
- Destination: Halifax Stanfield International Airport, Halifax, Canada
- Passengers: 174
- Crew: 8
- Fatalities: 0
- Survivors: 182

CanJet Flight 918 (CJA 918, C6 918) was a flight that was scheduled to take off from Sangster International Airport (MBJ), Montego Bay, Jamaica, on 19 April 2009, bound for Halifax Stanfield International Airport (YHZ), Halifax, Canada, but was instead seized before takeoff for hours by an armed, lone hijacker. This was likely the fourth hijacking on Jamaican soil, and the second time a Canadian airliner had been hijacked.

== Hijacking ==
The flight was operated by a nine year old Boeing 737-800 built in 2000, with the registration of C-FTCZ by the Canadian airline CanJet. Carrying 174 passengers and 8 crew, all Canadian, the plane was originally scheduled to leave MBJ at 11:00pm on 19 April 2009, due for arrival at YHZ at 7:15am the following day. However, at 10:30pm, Flight 918 was boarded by a lone, armed hijacker – 20-year-old Stephen Fray of Montego Bay, calling himself "Rico" – who gained access to the plane brandishing a firearm and demanded to be taken to Cuba so he could defect there. The passengers were soon released, as a flight attendant had convinced Fray to allow the passengers to leave in exchange for money. However, he still held five crew members hostage while negotiations continued. According to CNN, Fray's father and the Prime Minister of Jamaica, Bruce Golding, were both flown in by helicopter to assist in the negotiating process.

Following the breakdown of negotiations, the police were ordered to take the aircraft, and, at approximately 6:40am, the Jamaica Defence Force Counter Terrorism Operations Group members stormed Flight 918 and took the gunman into custody. Two special operations operatives entered through the cockpit window and replaced the copilot, while one of the operatives, impersonating the copilot, met with and overpowered the hijacker, who was reported to be "mentally challenged."

== Reactions ==
At the time of the hijacking, the Prime Minister of Canada, Stephen Harper, was in the midst of a visit to Jamaica, and, when informed of the event and release of some hostages, offered the use of his government aircraft to fly the passengers back to Canada.

Michel Juneau-Katsuya, a security analyst for CTV News and former Canadian Security Intelligence Service officer, expressed concern over airport security in Jamaica, given the visit by the Canadian Prime Minister at the time of the hijacking, which he opined should have placed security on high alert. The Jamaica Observer similarly reported on concerns raised in Jamaica over the privatised airport security's quality; the security was managed by a consortium, MBJ Airports Ltd., headed by the Canadian firm Vancouver Airport Services (25% stakeholder), with Abertis as a partner.

== Aftermath ==
After CanJet sent an aircraft from its hub Montreal to retrieve passengers from Montego Bay and return them to Canada, Bruce Golding advised Governor-General Sir Patrick Allen to order an investigation into how a gunman was able to board an airliner in Jamaica. The Governor-in-Council further issued an apology to the passengers and crew of Flight 918 and offered a one-week vacation at a Sandals resort in Jamaica. Transport Minister Mike Henry also ordered a security review, which covered both MBJ and Norman Manley International Airport in the capital, Kingston.

The Airline Pilots Association (ALPA) commended the crew for their efforts in thwarting the skyjacking, and on 15 June 2009, the crew of Flight 918 was invited to meet with the Governor General of Canada, Michaëlle Jean, at Rideau Hall.

On 1 May 2009, Stephen Fray was officially charged with assault, robbery with aggravation, illegal possession of a firearm, illegal possession of ammunition, shooting with intent, and breaching the Civil Aviation Act in connection with the hijacking. Fray was convicted and sentenced to a total of 20 years in prison.

On 20 May 2011, an appeal of Fray's conviction and sentence was launched in Jamaica's Court of Appeal. Fray's lawyer claimed in court that when Fray committed the offence, he was "suffering from a mental illness as understood in Jamaican law, specifically the Mental Health Act," adding that spending time in jail "would not help Fray or the society at large".
