= USA3000 Airlines =

Airline of the United States (2001–2012)

IATA	ICAO	Call sign
U5	GWY	GETAWAY
- Founded: December 26, 2001
- Ceased operations: January 30, 2012
- Fleet size: 2 (at closure)
- Destinations: 2 (at closure)
- Parent company: Apple Vacations
- Headquarters: Newtown Township, Pennsylvania, U.S.
- Key people: John J. Mullen, (Former President, Chairman & CEO)

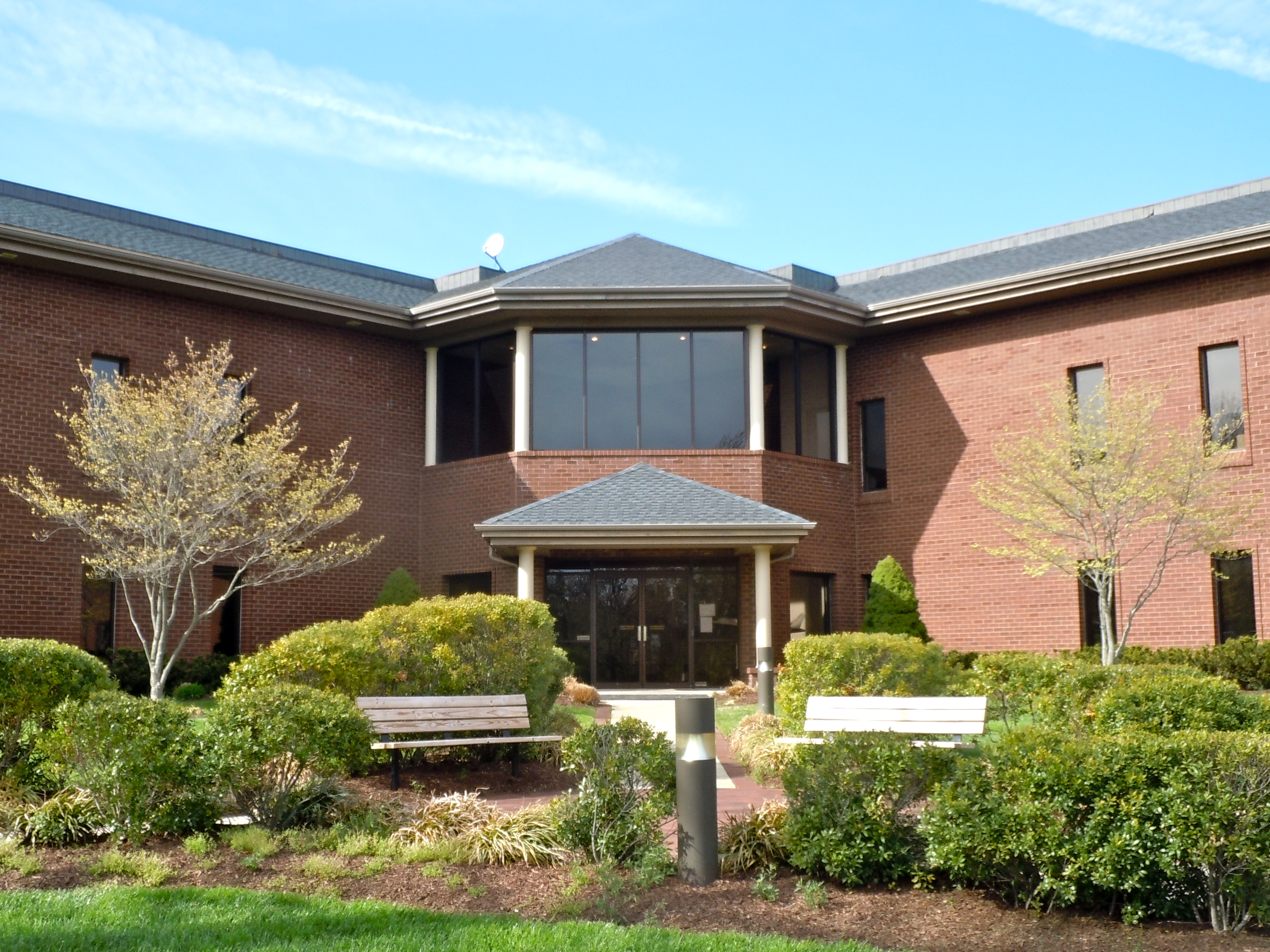
Headquarters in Newtown Square, PA

Brendan Airways, LLC, doing business as USA3000 Airlines, was an airline in the United States headquartered in Newtown Township, Delaware County, Pennsylvania. It operated both scheduled and charter service with a fleet of five Airbus A320 aircraft. The airline's last flight departed on January 30, 2012.

== History ==
=== Launch & Apple Vacation Charters: 2000–2002 ===
USA 3000 Airlines began operations with one Airbus A320. The inaugural flight on December 28, 2001, flew from Philadelphia to Cancun. By early 2002, USA 3000 Airlines exclusively operated charter flights, from Philadelphia, Newark, Hartford and Columbus, with two aircraft. A third aircraft, an A320 was added to the fleet in 2002 and based at Chicago O’Hare International Airport.

=== Expansion & Scheduled service: 2003–2007 ===
In order for USA 3000 to generate additional revenue, the existing charter flights were also offered as scheduled, allowing passengers to book flights without purchasing an Apple Vacation package.

In 2003, additional scheduled service was launched from northeastern U.S. cities to Florida, Bermuda, and throughout the Caribbean. Scheduled domestic destinations eventually included Fort Lauderdale, Fort Myers, Raleigh, St. Petersburg/Clearwater, Orlando, Melbourne, Florida, and Sarasota. Northern cities or "Gateway cities" included Newark, Philadelphia, Pittsburgh, Baltimore, Cleveland, Columbus, Cincinnati, Detroit, Chicago (O'Hare), and St. Louis. Additionally, USA 3000 offered seasonal service from Hartford, Boston, and Milwaukee.

By late 2004, USA 3000 Airlines operated 12 permanent A320 aircraft, plus 2 additional seasonal aircraft leased from Condor Airlines.

=== Cutbacks & Military Charters: 2008–2012 ===
In early 2008, it was announced that USA 3000 Airlines would be pulling out of Newark Liberty Airport due to increased competition from discount carriers.

By Summer 2008, USA3000 Airlines began a major reduction of its Florida service, closing all stations except Fort Myers. USA3000 has cited record-high fuel prices as reason for the service cuts. According to former USA 3000 COO Angus Kinnear, "Florida has some of the lowest domestic air fares in the country and only Fort Myers fetches ticket prices high enough to make money with oil at $125 a barrel." In the same announcement, the airline confirmed the continuation of its remaining scheduled service, with a strong focus on maintaining the more profitable international routes. However seasonal service was restored in late 2008 to St. Petersburg/Clearwater Airport from Chicago (O'Hare) due to a decrease in oil prices, reduction in flights by competitors, and a demonstration of customer support.

In November 2008, Steven Harfst was named CEO.

In January 2009, USA 3000 submitted a Statement of Intent to the United States Transportation Command (USTRANSCOM) based at Scott Air Force Base to be certified into the country's Civil Reserve Air Fleet (CRAF). USA 3000 became a certified CRAF air carrier, and was able to bid on the military's domestic and short-range international charters. USA 3000 also sought “Ad Hoc” charter opportunities to improve aircraft utilization and enhanced their website to improve sales, customer service, and ancillary revenue opportunities.

USA 3000 ended all of its services from Detroit and Milwaukee in April 2009. citing poor demand and the economic downturn. USA 3000 also ended service from Baltimore and Pittsburgh later that summer for the same reasons. However, those services were later offered seasonally, with USA3000 restoring service to Detroit in October 2009.

The Fort Myers crew base closed in March 2010. However, flight schedules from Southwest Florida International Airport were not impacted, according to the USA 3000 CEO.

In 2011, USA 3000 operated a fleet of 5 Airbus A320 aircraft.

In November 2011, Apple Vacations decided to dissolve USA 3000 Airlines. Apple Vacations subsequently used other carriers such as Frontier Airlines, Sun Country Airlines, (Now Allegiant Air) AirTran Airways, Alaska Airlines and Aeroméxico to transport its customers to the Caribbean and Central America.

The airline's last scheduled flight arrived on January 30, 2012. The airline intended to serve all existing charters through May 2012.

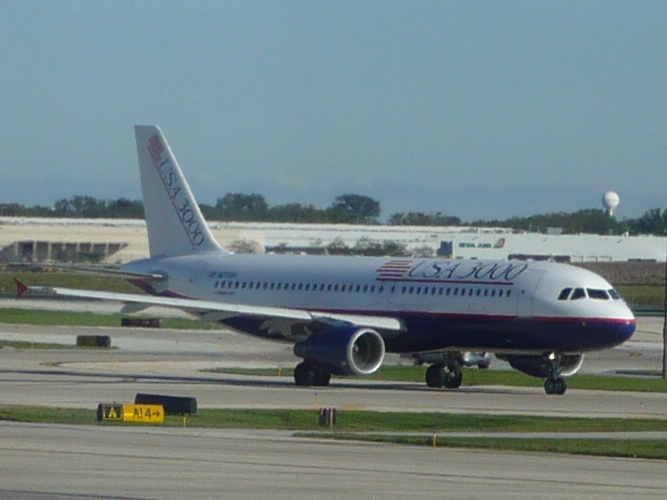
USA3000 Airbus A320 at Pittsburgh International Airport

== Similarly named airlines ==
- Canada 3000

== See also ==
- List of defunct airlines of the United States
