= Canada 3000 =

Discount charter airline of Canada (1988–2001)

Canada 3000 Airlines

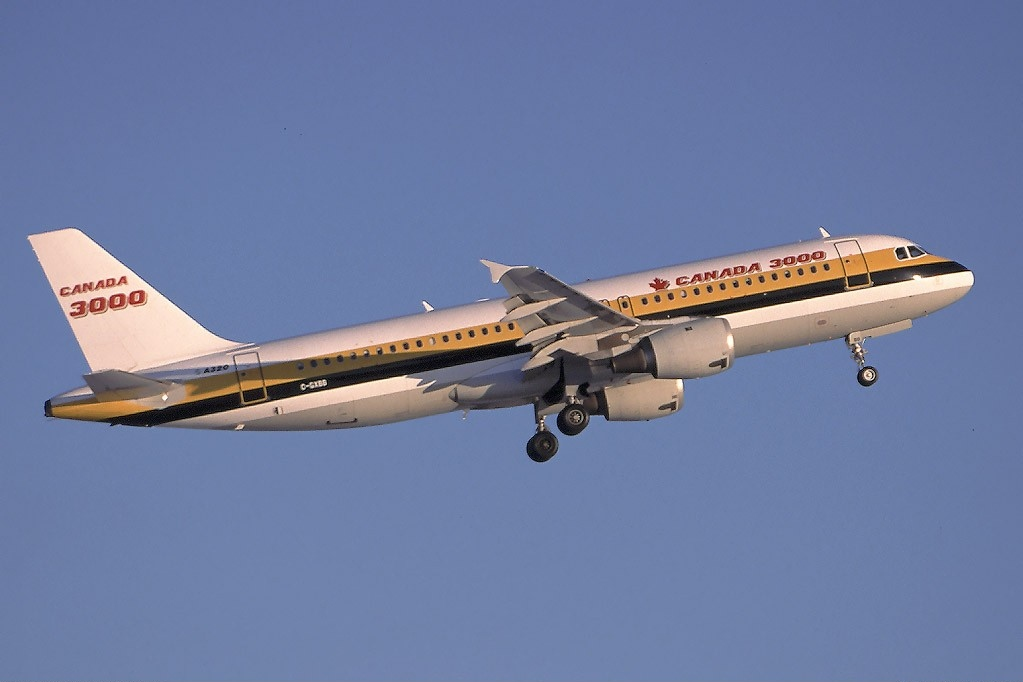
| IATA | ICAO | Call sign |
|---|---|---|
| 2T | CMM | ELITE |
- Founded: 1988
- Ceased operations: November 8, 2001
- Hubs: Toronto–Pearson; Vancouver
- Focus cities: Calgary; Montréal–Mirabel
- Frequent-flyer program: AAdvantage (only for miles earning)
- Fleet size: 51
- Parent company: Air 2000
- Headquarters: Etobicoke, Toronto, Ontario
- Key people: Robert Deluce (CEO; 1988–1995); Angus Kinnear (CEO; 1995–2001)
- Website: canada3000.ca

Canada 3000 Airlines Inc. was a Canadian discount charter airline offering domestic and international flights. It was the largest charter airline in the world at the time of its operation, with over 90 destinations worldwide, although it changed to scheduled service in 2000 after the Canadian Airlines and Air Canada merger. Canada 3000 competed with Air Canada, WestJet, and fellow charter airline Air Transat. In November 2001, the airline went out of business after a sharp decline in revenues following the September 11 attacks in the United States. There have been several attempts to restart the airline since then. The airline was headquartered in Etobicoke in the west-end of Toronto, Ontario.

== History ==
=== Operations ===
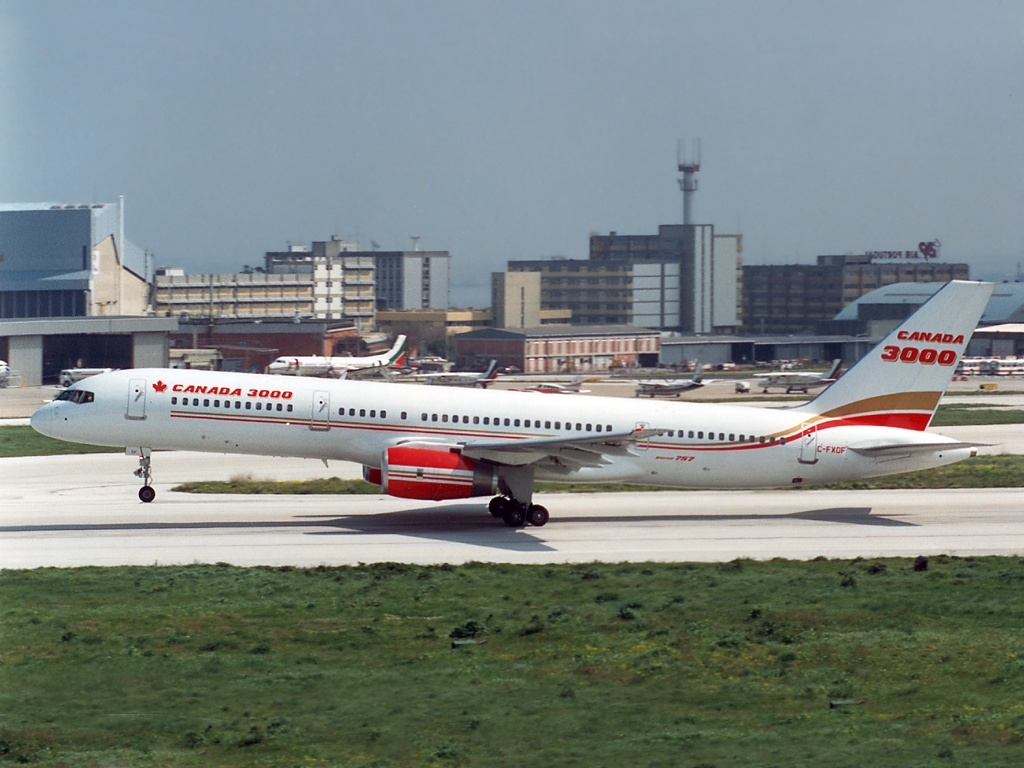
A Canada 3000 Boeing 757-200 at Lisbon Airport in 1991

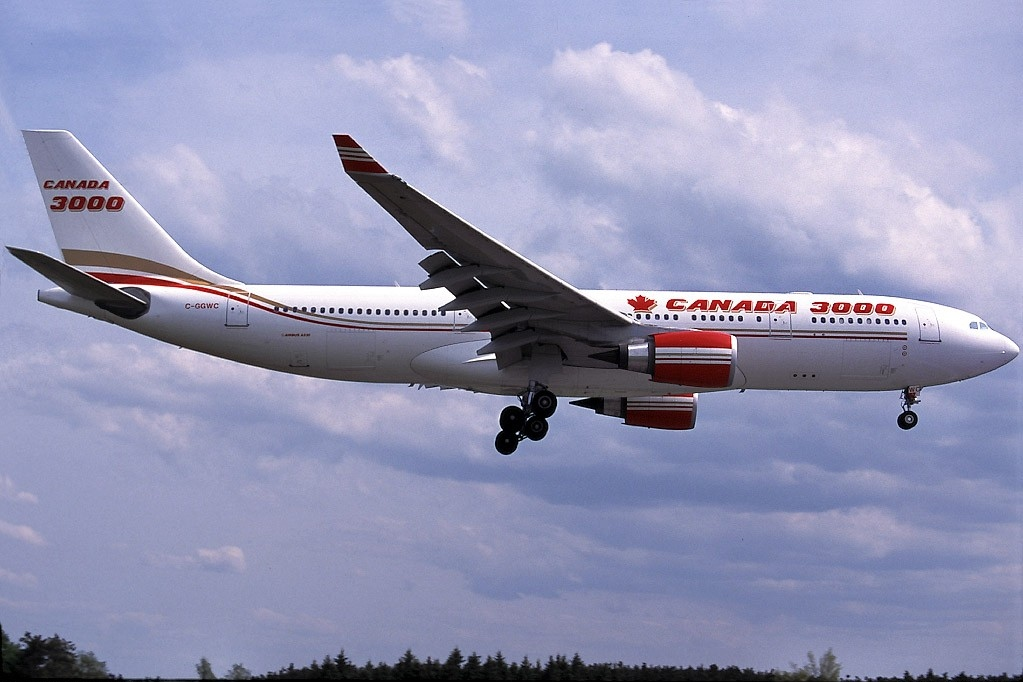
Canada 3000 was the first A330-200 operator in April 1998

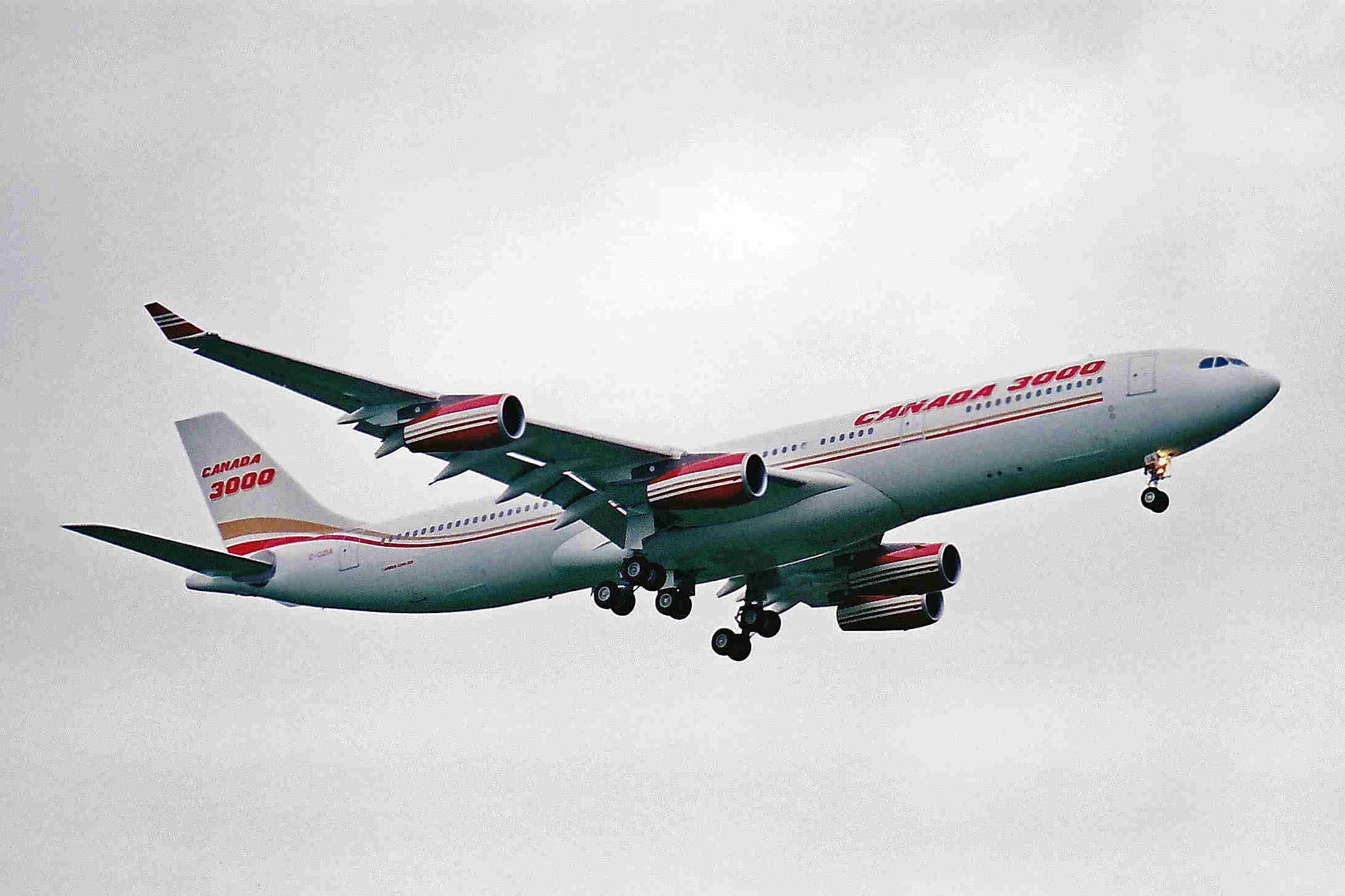
A Canada 3000 Airbus A340-300 at Manchester Airport in 2001

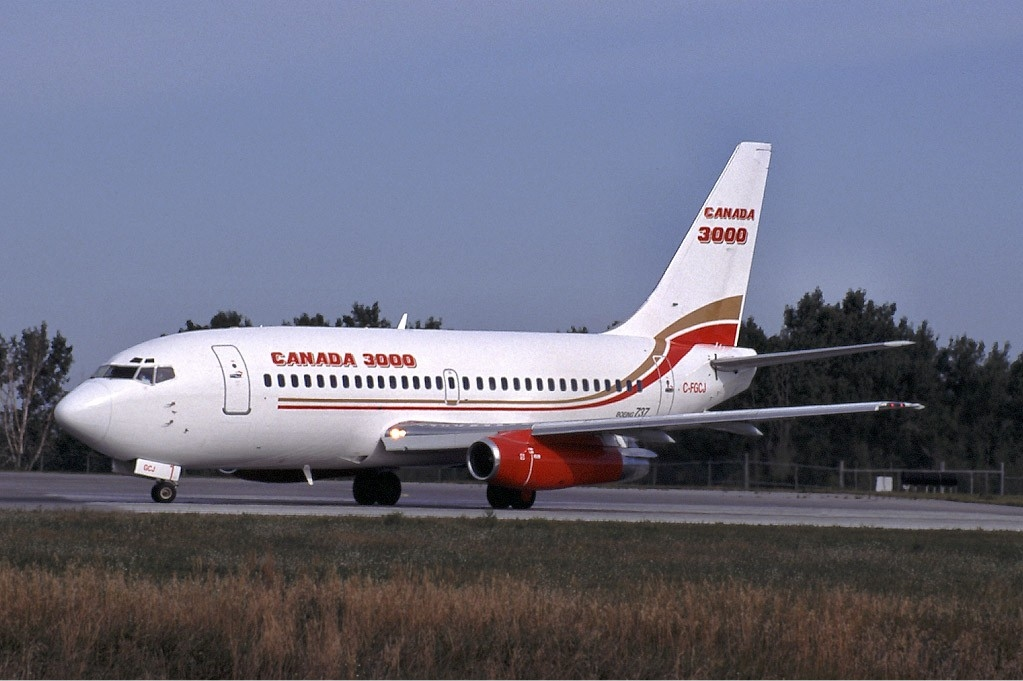
A Canada 3000 Boeing 737-200 at Ottawa Macdonald–Cartier International Airport in 2001

The airline was created in 1988 by British airline Air 2000, initially for charter service to lease some of its airplanes for Canadian charter travel (dubbed as Air 2000 Airline Ltd). The airline was denied a license to operate by the National Transport Agency (NTA) because of the control and ownership of the UK firm. Air 2000 dropped out of an ownership position, and the airline started operations in December 1988. On May 1, 1989, by order of the NTA, it changed its name to Canada 3000. The next year the airline acquired Vacationair and a subsidiary was created in Mexico with the name Aerofiesta (not to be confused with the similarly named Aero Fiesta Mexicana, which was founded in 1993). The company's owners were the Deluce family (25%), chairman John Lecky (45%) and Adventure Tours (30%). Following the demise of Wardair, the company's goal was to become Canada's largest charter carrier, a position it attained in 1991.

The cover of the Canada 3000 summer of 1997 flight schedule stated the airline was serving destinations in Belgium, Denmark, England, Fiji, France, Germany, Iceland, the Netherlands, Portugal, Scotland and the U.S. as well as Canada.

In 1998, co-founder and CEO Angus Kinnear was the recipient of the Tony Jannus Award for his contributions to commercial air transportation. As of 1998, the airline carried over 2.5 million passengers annually, and had destinations in 22 countries. In April 1998, Canada 3000 became the launch customer and first commercial operator of the Airbus A330-200.

In 1999, Canada 3000 purchased Holiday Travel Consultants based out of Vancouver from Richard and Shelley Carlin, which expanded to become Canada 3000's retail division under the name Canada 3000 Tickets. By the time it closed its doors, Canada 3000 had expanded its retail division to include 40 branch offices as well as three call centers in Montreal, Toronto and Vancouver.

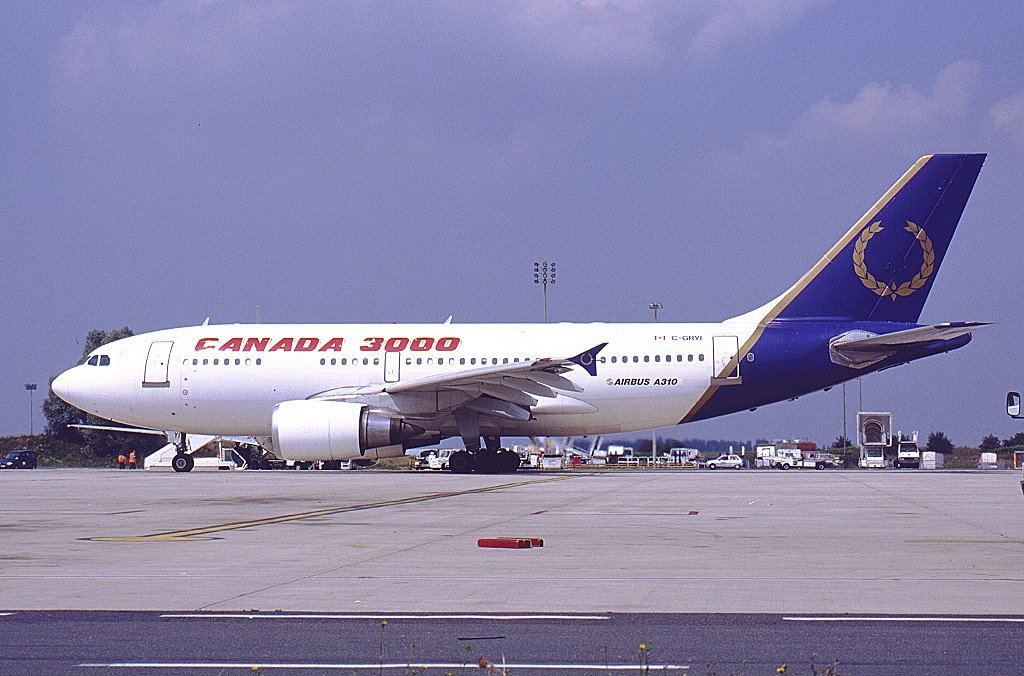
A Canada 3000 Airbus A310-300 at Paris-Charles de Gaulle Airport in 2001. It was carrying a Canada 3000/Royal Aviation hybrid livery after they purchased the latter

In 2000, Canada 3000 went public, raising $30 million in an IPO. In January 2001, Canada 3000 bought charter carrier Royal Aviation of Montreal, Quebec for $84 million. The company also acquired Royal Cargo Airlines' cargo division, renaming it to Canada 3000 Cargo. In March 2001 it also took over CanJet for $7.5 million in stock. In May 2001, following the merger of Canadian Airlines International with Air Canada, Canada 3000 also started operating scheduled flights. In October 2001, one month before its demise, Canada 3000 became the first airline to operate non-stop service from North America to India.

=== Collapse ===
On November 8, 2001 the company suddenly collapsed with no warning for travelers or employees. The company filed for bankruptcy, citing a downturn in air travel during the weeks following the September 11 terrorist attacks on the United States. The fleet was left grounded at various airports around the world, leaving 50,000 vacationers stranded. September 10, 2001 was a record booking day, but within a few days air traffic declined by 50%. The airline was offered a $75 million loan guarantee from the Canadian government under the condition of a 'viable business plan' being produced. By November 7, 2001, the airline had $260 million in debt, and only had $1.49 million in cash. In secret, it had applied to the Canada Labour Board for permission to cut labour costs by 30% by closing its Royal division immediately. The Board would not approve without union agreement. Union offers to cut 700 pilot and flight attendant positions did not provide enough savings immediately and the airline applied for bankruptcy protection on November 8, while it planned to continue flying. By the end of the day, airport authorities in Toronto and St. John's, Newfoundland had seized planes under court authority and the company directors decided to cease operations.

Out of bankruptcy, the Canada 3000 Cargo operation, which was still operating, was sold off and became Cargojet Airways, run by former Canada 3000 executive Ajay Virmani. In 2002, Michel Leblanc, the former owner of Royal Airlines and later a director with Canada 3000 went on to form another scheduled discount airline, Jetsgo, which lasted almost three years before it too collapsed and filed for bankruptcy protection on March 11, 2005. The CEO, Robert Deluce continued in the airline business with the successful Porter Airlines out of Billy Bishop Toronto City Airport.

In 2005, a group of investors had planned to launch a new Canada 3000, with two Boeing 757-200s.

== Fleet ==
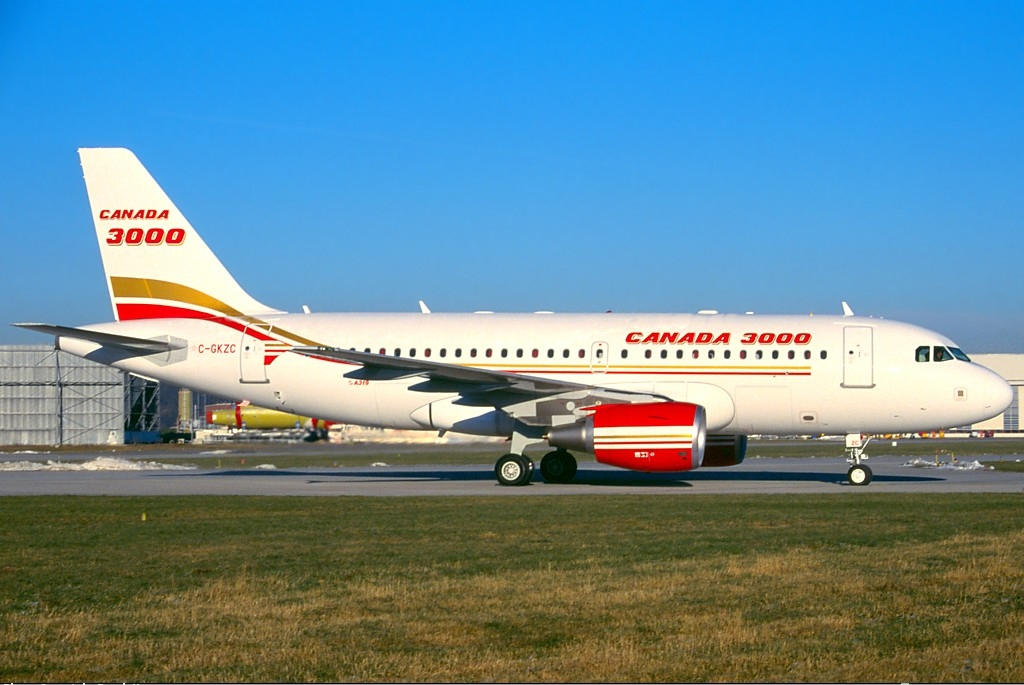
A Canada 3000 Airbus A319-100 at Hamburg Finkenwerder Airport in 2002

During its 13-year existence, Canada 3000 operated the following aircraft:

Canada 3000 fleet
| Aircraft | Total | Introduced | Retired | Notes |
|---|---|---|---|---|
| Airbus A310-300 | 4 | 2001 | 2001 | Taken from Royal Aviation. |
| Airbus A319-100 | 1 | 2001 | 2001 | Transferred to Skyservice Airlines. |
| Airbus A320-200 | 10 | 1993 | 2001 | |
| Airbus A330-200 | 4 | 1998 | 2001 | Launch customer. |
| Airbus A340-300 | 1 | 2001 | 2001 | Transferred to Air Tahiti Nui. |
| Boeing 737-200 | 17 | 2001 | 2001 | |
| Boeing 757-200 | 14 | 1990 | 2001 | |

== See also ==
- List of defunct airlines of Canada
