= Royal Aviation =

Charter airline of Canada (1991–2001)

Royal Airlines

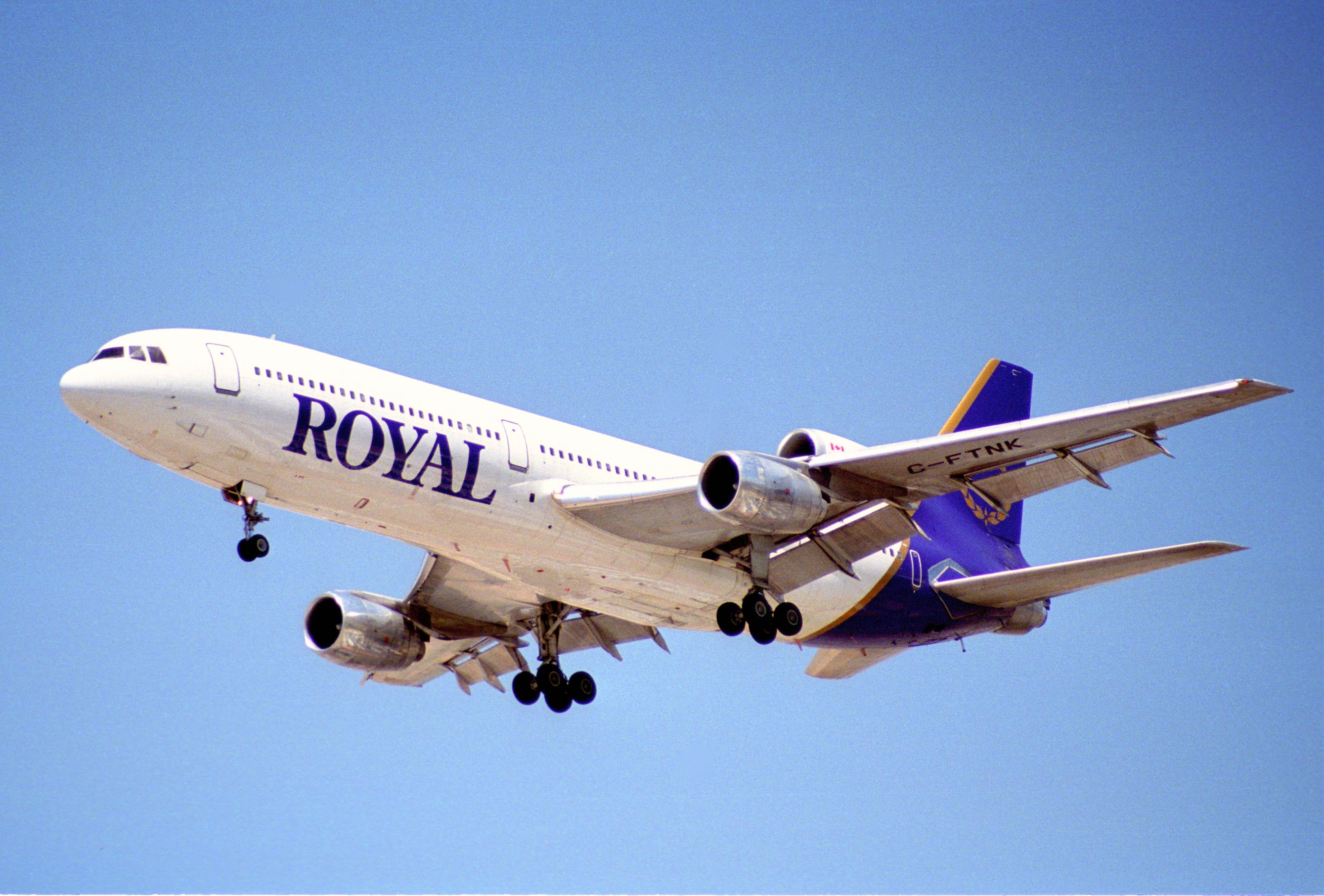
- L 1011 Tristar of Royal Aviation
IATA	ICAO	Call sign
QN	ROY	ROY
- Founded: 1991
- Ceased operations: May 1, 2001 (acquired by Canada 3000)
- Hubs: Montréal–Dorval International Airport
- Focus cities: Toronto Pearson International Airport
- Subsidiaries: Royal Cargo Airlines
- Fleet size: 22
- Destinations: 14
- Parent company: ROYAL AVIATION
- Headquarters: Montreal, Quebec, Canada
- Founder: Michel Leblanc

Royal Aviation Incorporated was the parent of Canadian scheduled passenger and charter airline, Royal Airlines, which was based in Montréal–Dorval International Airport. The airline was acquired in 2001 by Canada 3000, which in turn went bankrupt in the months following the September 11 attacks.

== History ==
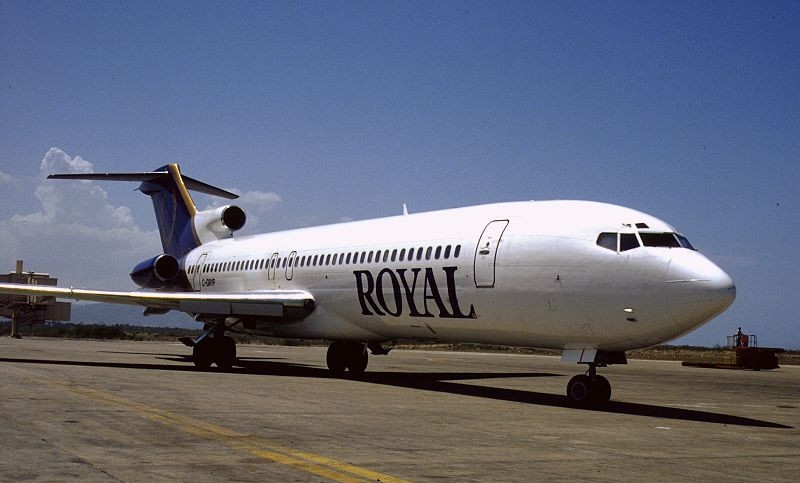
A Royal Airlines Boeing 727-200 parked at Gregorio Luperón International Airport in 1994

The airline was founded by Michel Leblanc in 1991. According to the June 1, 1999, North American edition of the Official Airline Guide, Royal was operating Airbus A310, Boeing 737-200 and Boeing 757-200 aircraft in scheduled passenger service to several destinations in Canada and the U.S., including Charlottetown, PEI, Edmonton, Fort Lauderdale, Halifax, Honolulu, Montreal (Dorval Airport), Orlando, St. Petersburg, FL, Toronto and Vancouver. The airline also operated transatlantic scheduled passenger flights between Canada and Europe during its existence, including service to Berlin, Frankfurt and Munich in Germany as well as destinations in the U.K.

Royal was acquired by Canada 3000 on January 29, 2001 in an all-stock deal. While the takeover/merger was touted in glowing terms in press releases, analysts quietly shared the opinion that, based on the terms of the transaction, Royal had few options and little time left. Michel Leblanc received Canada 3000 shares worth $84 million and became a Canada 3000 vice-chairman.

Almost all of Royal Aviation's Royal Airlines aircraft were re-painted into the Canada 3000 livery, although some maintained a mixed livery with the Canada 3000 logo and Royal Aviation tail design, to recognize the merger between the two airlines. Canada 3000 also purchased Royal Cargo Airlines, renaming it Canada 3000 Cargo. Canada 3000 Cargo was later sold off and became Cargojet Airways.

Only a few months after the merger closed in June 2001, Leblanc was fired from Canada 3000 in a bitter feud, as Canada 3000 filed a lawsuit against him for allegations of fraud and misrepresentation. However, the allegations were never proven in court and Leblanc claimed to have subsequently sold off all his shares of Canada 3000 before they stopped trading. However, a review of the cumulative trading volume in Canada 3000 shares over the period in question (June 2001 - November 10, 2001) shows that nowhere near that volume of shares crossed the trading floor, indicating that either the “glowing terms” referenced above were a continuing fabrication, or there were restrictions on the sale of these shares.

On November 8, 2001, the entire Canada 3000 company suddenly ceased operations with no warning for travelers or employees. The company filed for bankruptcy, citing a downturn in air travel during the weeks following the September 11, 2001 terrorist attacks in the United States. All Canada 3000 workers as well as the former Royal Aviation workers lost their jobs.

Leblanc went on to create a discount airline named Jetsgo in 2002. It went bankrupt in 2005, in a similar unexpected manner akin to Canada 3000's demise.

== Destinations ==
Royal Airlines served the following cities and airports:

Canada

- Charlottetown (Charlottetown Airport)
- Edmonton (Edmonton International Airport)
- Halifax (Halifax Stanfield International Airport)
- Montréal (Montréal–Dorval International Airport) Hub
- Toronto (Toronto Pearson International Airport) Focus city
- Vancouver (Vancouver International Airport)

Sydney, NS J.A. Douglas McCurdy Sydney, NS

Germany

- Berlin (Berlin Tempelhof Airport)
- Munich (Munich Airport)

United Kingdom

- London
  - (Gatwick Airport)
  - (London Stansted Airport)
- Manchester (Manchester Airport)

United States

- Fort Lauderdale (Fort Lauderdale–Hollywood International Airport)
- Honolulu (Daniel K. Inouye International Airport)
- Orlando (Orlando International Airport)
- Tampa (St. Pete–Clearwater International Airport)

== Fleet ==
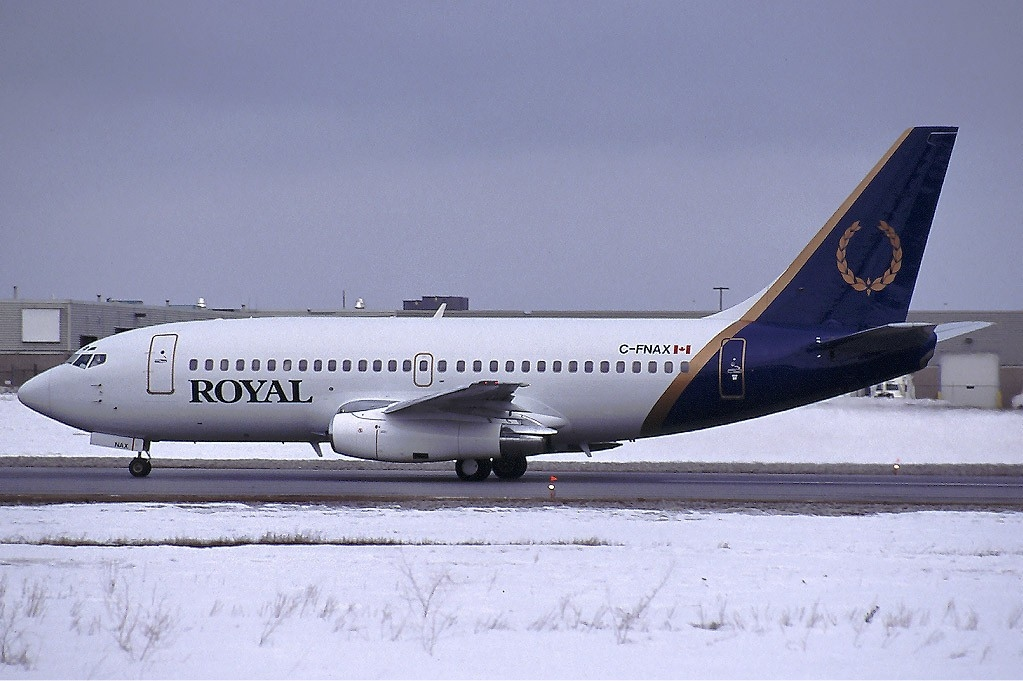
A Royal Airlines Boeing 737-200 at Ottawa Macdonald–Cartier International Airport in 2001

Royal Airlines formerly operated the following mainline jet aircraft types:

Royal Aviation fleet
Aircraft	Total	Introduced	Retired	Notes
Airbus A310-300	4	1997	2001	
Airbus A320-200	2	1995	1996	
Boeing 727-200	8	1991	2000	
Boeing 737-200	10	1997	2001	5 leased from US Airways.
Boeing 737-200F	2	1997	2001	Freighter aircraft operated as Royal Cargo Airlines.
Boeing 757-200	6	1998	2001	3 leased from Air 2000.
Lockheed L-1011 TriStar	4	1996	2001	

== See also ==
- List of defunct airlines of Canada
