= Jetsgo =

Low-cost airline of Canada (2002–2005)

IATA	ICAO	Call sign
SG	JGO	JETSGO
- Founded: June 12, 2002
- Ceased operations: March 11, 2005
- Operating bases: Montréal–Trudeau; Toronto–Pearson
- Frequent-flyer program: JetSmiles
- Fleet size: 29
- Destinations: 41
- Headquarters: 7800 chemin Côte de Liesse, Saint-Laurent, Quebec
- Key people: Michel Leblanc (CEO)
- Website: Jetsgo.net

Jetsgo Corporation was a short-lived Canadian low-cost airline based in the Saint-Laurent borough of Montreal. Jetsgo served 19 destinations across Canada, 10 destinations in the United States, and 12 scheduled weekend-charter destinations in the Caribbean. At the time the third-largest carrier in the country, Jetsgo abruptly ended service and entered bankruptcy protection on March 11, 2005, leaving thousands of passengers stranded at the beginning of the busy March-break travel season. According to news outlets, the airline was processing orders and taking payments for flights the night before they claimed insolvency and ceased operations.

Soon after its demise, the company pledged to make a comeback as a charter-only airline. However, on May 13, 2005, the airline filed for bankruptcy protection, cancelled plans to relaunch service and began the process of liquidation.

== History ==
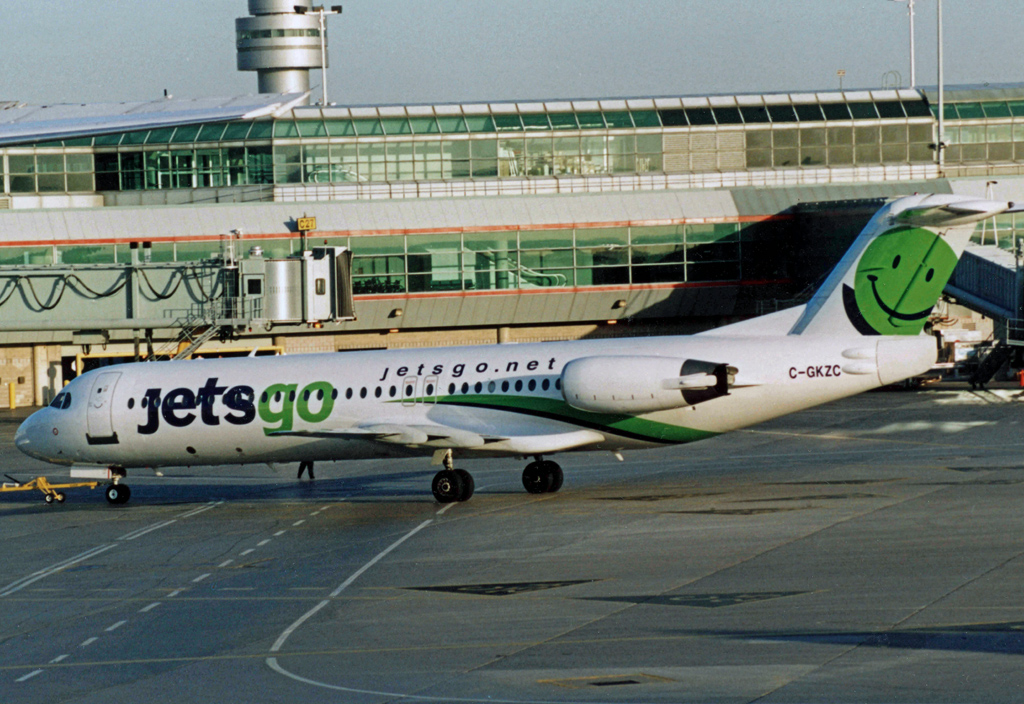
Fokker 100 of Jetsgo at Toronto Pearson International Airport’s Terminal 3 in September 2004.

Jetsgo was launched on June 12, 2002, and ceased operations on March 11, 2005. The airline was Canada's third-largest airline at the time, controlling up to 10% of the domestic market. Expert analysts widely blame the airline for poor management. Founder Michel Leblanc had previously founded Royal Aviation, which he later sold to Canada 3000.

On March 11, 2005, Jetsgo abruptly announced that it had ceased operations. The action stranded thousands of passengers in airports and at their travel destinations with no way home, the defunct airline having made no arrangements with other carriers to handle their passengers. This occurred on the Friday morning before the March Break holiday season, one of the busiest air travel days in 8 of 10 provinces.

1200 employees lost their jobs. Jetsgo had accumulated $55 million in debt in the last eight months before it closed. Employees were finally paid for the time prior to the airline's shutdown on March 14, 2005. Passengers who had purchased Jetsgo tickets were forced to apply for refunds through their credit card companies or travel agencies. Air Canada and WestJet ran additional flights to bring the stranded passengers home.

Because of its abrupt shutdown, the Jetsgo name was frequently corrupted to "Jetsgone" in some media reports. Passenger Satoshi Takano also used this term for a website which he created for former employees. It operated under that name for some time after the company's demise.

In February 2007 the media reported that the United States military was using the former call sign assigned to Jetsgo during flights over European Union (EU) territory. The Sunday Times said that the call sign had been used by military flights involving so-called "extraordinary rendition" of political detainees to black site destinations.

== Staff ==
The airline employed 1,350 people at the time that it filed for bankruptcy.

== Incidents and accidents ==
In March 2005 Transport Canada said that investigators found issues with the operating methods of Jetsgo. The deficiencies were discovered during "a special inspection" into engine problems revealed after a forced landing in Toronto in January 2005.

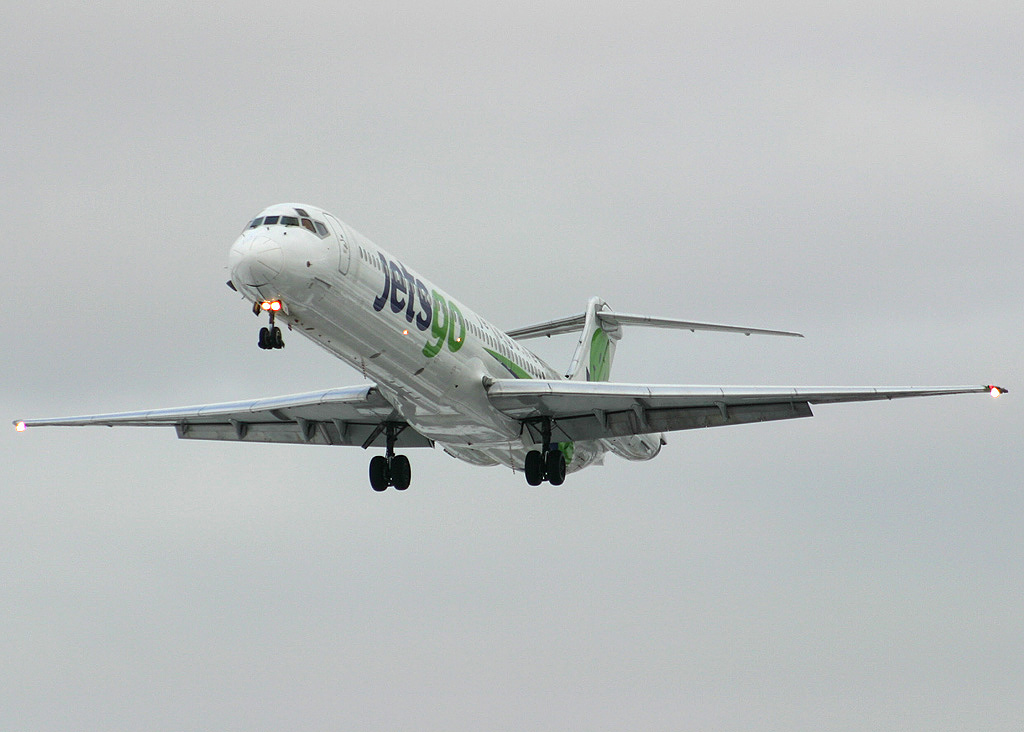
Jetsgo Airlines MD-83 landing at Toronto in January 2005

Number of incidents reported on a yearly basis concerning Jetsgo:

- 2002: 5
- 2003: 15
- 2004: 32
- 2005: 7
- Total (2002–2005): 60

On 20 January 2005 a Jetsgo McDonnell Douglas MD-83 landing in poor weather and low visibility at Calgary International Airport, in Calgary, Alberta, veered left off runway 34 and hit a runway hold-short sign, damaging landing gear and flaps. The plane then declared a missed approach, took off and landed again. There were no casualties.

== Destinations ==
=== Canada ===
- Alberta
  - Calgary – Calgary International Airport
  - Edmonton – Edmonton International Airport
  - Fort McMurray – Fort McMurray International Airport
- British Columbia
  - Abbotsford – Abbotsford International Airport
  - Kelowna – Kelowna International Airport
  - Prince George – Prince George Airport
  - Vancouver – Vancouver International Airport
  - Victoria – Victoria International Airport
- Manitoba
  - Winnipeg – Winnipeg James Armstrong Richardson International Airport
- Newfoundland and Labrador
  - Stephenville – Stephenville International Airport
  - St. John's – St. John's International Airport
- Nova Scotia
  - Halifax – Halifax Stanfield International Airport
  - Sydney – JA Douglas McCurdy Sydney Airport
- New Brunswick
  - Moncton – Greater Moncton International Airport
  - Saint John – Saint John Airport
- Ontario
  - Ottawa – Ottawa Macdonald–Cartier International Airport
  - Thunder Bay – Thunder Bay International Airport
  - Toronto – Toronto Pearson International Airport
  - Timmins – Timmins Victor M. Power Airport
- Prince Edward Island
  - Charlottetown – Charlottetown Airport
- Quebec
  - Montreal – Montréal–Trudeau International Airport
  - Quebec City – Québec City Jean Lesage International Airport
- Saskatchewan
  - Saskatoon – Saskatoon John G. Diefenbaker International Airport

=== United States ===
- California
  - Los Angeles – Los Angeles International Airport
- Florida
  - Fort Lauderdale – Fort Lauderdale–Hollywood International Airport
  - Fort Myers – Southwest Florida International Airport
  - Orlando/Sanford – Orlando Sanford International Airport
  - Sarasota – Sarasota–Bradenton International Airport
  - St. Petersburg – St. Pete–Clearwater International Airport
  - West Palm Beach – Palm Beach International Airport
- Nevada
  - Las Vegas – Harry Reid International Airport
- New Jersey
  - Newark – Newark Liberty International Airport
- New York
  - New York City – LaGuardia Airport

== Charter operations ==
Jetsgo also operated weekend scheduled charter services from Toronto and Montreal to destinations in Cuba, the Dominican Republic and Mexico.

== Fleet ==
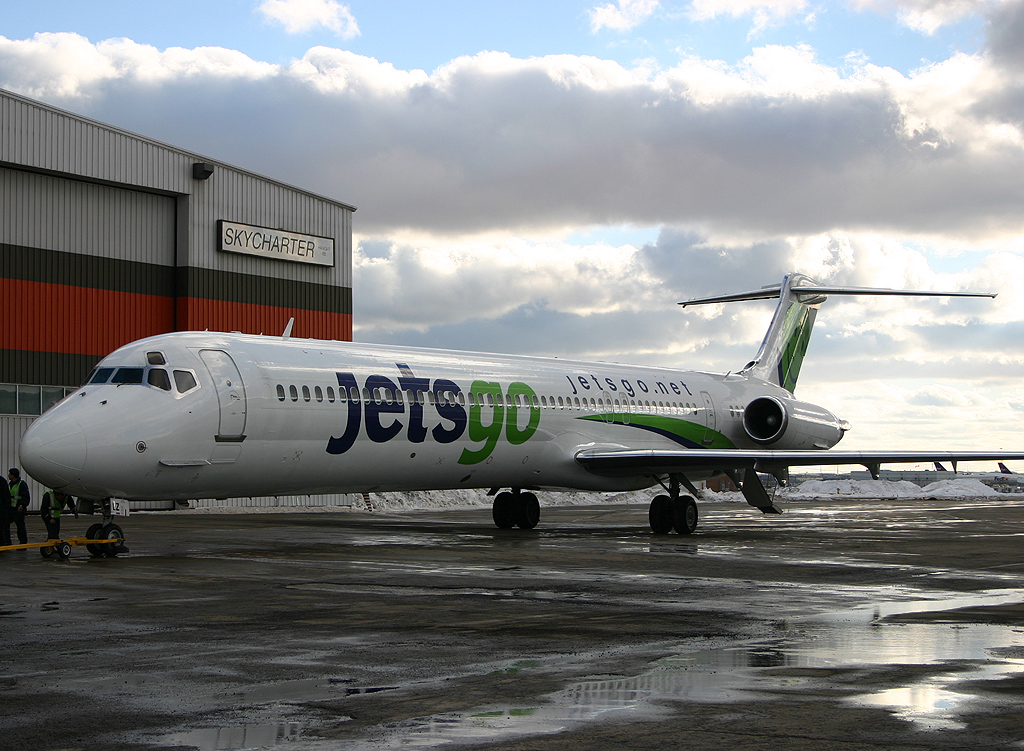
Jetsgo Airlines MD-83 parked outside a hangar at Toronto Pearson Int'l Airport

Jetsgo operated a fleet of 14 McDonnell Douglas MD-83 and 11 Fokker 100 (plus six Fokker 100 in storage); three more Fokker 100s were due for delivery in 2005. Seating in all aircraft was configured in an "all-economy" setting typical of low-cost carriers. Jetsgo also had special "comfort plus" sections on most of their planes, which featured more leg room on seats A and B in rows 1 - 12, as well as no middle seat.

== Slogan ==
- "Jetsgo. Pay a little. Fly a lot." /"Jetsgo. Moins cher, plus souvent."

== See also ==
- List of defunct airlines of Canada
