= Skyservice Airlines =

Charter airline based in Canada, 1986–2010

IATA	ICAO	Call sign
5G	SSV	SKYFINDER/SKYTOUR
- Founded: 1986
- Ceased operations: March 31, 2010
- Operating bases: Toronto Pearson Airport; Montreal Trudeau Airport
- Fleet size: 18
- Destinations: 78
- Parent company: Gibralt Capital Corporation, Vancouver
- Headquarters: Toronto, Ontario
- Key people: Rob Giguere, President and CEO; Ronald Patmore, former President of Skyservice; Russell Payson, former CEO and President
- Website: www.skyservice.com (redirects to current Business Aviation site)

Skyservice Airlines Inc. was a charter airline (Skyservice Airlines) based in Etobicoke, Toronto, Ontario, Canada. It employed more than 2,000 people. Skyservice Airlines Inc. flew within Canada and to the United States, Caribbean, Mexico, Venezuela, Israel and Europe. During the summer, Skyservice sold tickets to Europe from Toronto using a Boeing 757-200WL. It also used an Airbus A330-300 for other chartered flights to Europe from Canada. Scheduled services to some destinations were offered during the summer season. Skyservice offered online-booking for those who wished to travel on Skyservice's scheduled destinations in the summer. Skyservice Airlines began operations in 1994.

Skyservice was forced into receivership on March 31, 2010, as a result of a near $9 million debt to its long-term partner Sunquest Vacations. As a result, Skyservice abruptly ceased operations. Roughly 860 jobs were expected to be lost.

== History ==
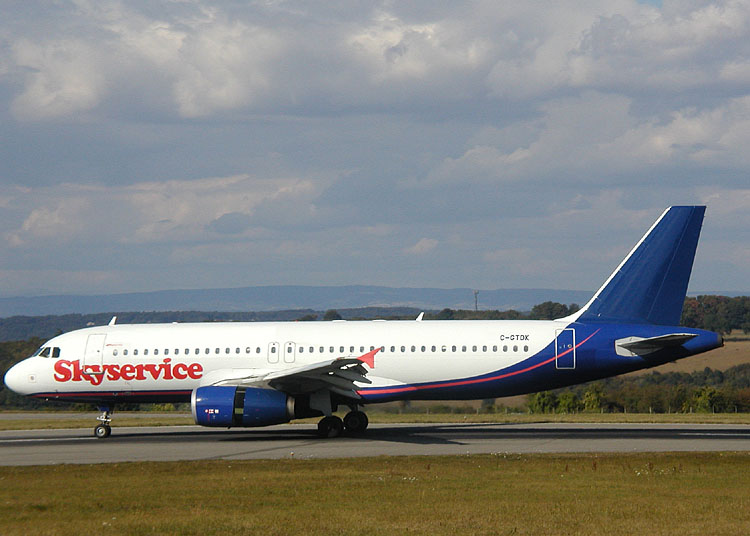
Skyservice Airbus A320.

The airline was started in 1986. On May 2, 2005, Skyservice introduced the first of two Boeing 767-300 aircraft to its fleet, the first of which entered service on that date with a flight from Toronto to Puerto Vallarta. The aircraft (both formerly with MyTravel Airways) operated summer charters from Toronto to the United Kingdom and Europe for Sunquest Vacations, and in the winter flew from Vancouver to the Caribbean and Mexico. It was one of the few discount airlines operating in Canada which still offered full meal service.

On August 28, 2007, it was announced that Skyservice had sold a majority interest in its airlines business to Vancouver-based private equity company Gibralt Capital Corp. No changes in senior management, operations or staffing levels were planned.

In March 2009, Skyservice partnered with Inflite Media to offer tray table advertising across its fleet of aircraft, the first such advertising network available in Canada.

Skyservice was forced into receivership on March 31, 2010, as a result of an $8.8 million debt to its long-term partner Sunquest Vacations. The last Skyservice flight, from Punta Cana to Winnipeg, took place on the same day.

The private charter portion of the airline continues to operate today under Skyservice Business Aviation with fixed base operations in Toronto, Ottawa, Montreal and Calgary.

== Fleet ==
The Skyservice fleet consisted of the following aircraft on 20 November 2009:

Skyservice fleet
Aircraft	Total	Passengers (Class Superiore/Star Class/Economy)	Registrations	Notes
Airbus A320-200	11	180 (0/0/180)	C-GTDP, C-GTDH, C-FZAZ, C-FRAA	Used on North/South American flights.
Boeing 757-200	10	233 (0/0/233); 197 (0/36/161) C-GMYH	C-GTSJ, C-GTBB, C-GMYH, C-FLOX, C-FFAN	C-GMYH & C-GTBB were equipped with winglets and used on North/South American and European flights. C-FLOX was leased to Arkefly during summer 2009.
Total	21			

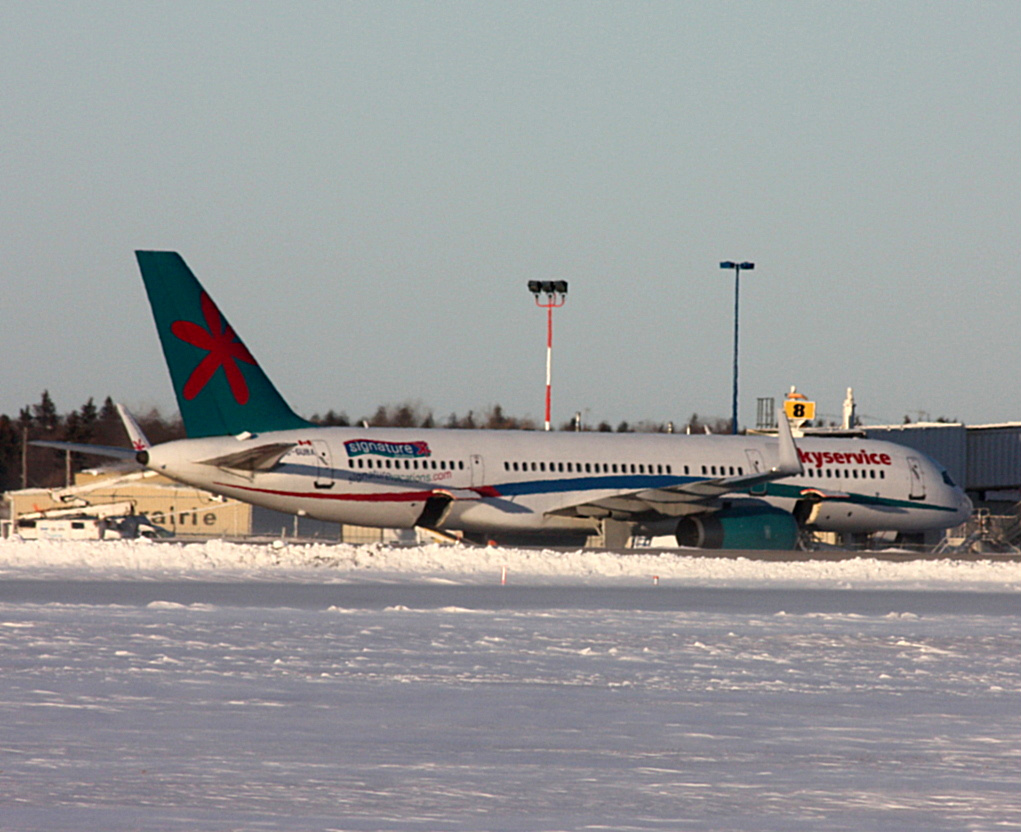
Skyservice B757-200 with winglets in Signature Vacations livery at Regina International Airport

=== Historical fleet ===
- 2 Boeing 767-300
- 4 Airbus A319
- 1 Airbus A330-300

== Classes ==
- Economy Class
- Star Class
- Superior Class
- Premier Class

== Awards and recognition ==
Skyservice was recognized for its exceptional safety record during its 25 years of operation, distinguishable by the highest Platinum rating awarded to Skyservice by the Aviation Research Group/US - North America's most rigid rating for operational safety.

== Skyservice Business Aviation ==
While the airline ceased operations, the business aviation section remains in operation today in Toronto, Ottawa, Calgary and Montreal.

== See also ==
- List of defunct airlines of Canada
