= List of Air Canada destinations =

Air Canada is the largest airline and flag carrier of Canada. Founded in 1937 as Trans-Canada Air Lines, it provides scheduled services to 195 destinations on six continents. Its largest hub is Toronto Pearson International Airport, followed by Montréal–Trudeau International Airport and Vancouver International Airport. Air Canada is the world's 10th largest passenger airline by fleet size, and the airline is a founding member of Star Alliance. In 2014, Air Canada together with its Air Canada Express regional partners carried over 38 million passengers. Between them, they operate on average more than 1,500 scheduled flights daily. Halifax to Vancouver is the longest domestic Canadian flight

The list shows airports that are served by Air Canada as part of its scheduled service. It includes destinations operated by Air Canada Rouge and Air Canada Express regional partners, and other charter services. The list includes the International Civil Aviation Organization (ICAO) code, city, province, country, the airport's name—with the airline's hubs and focus cities marked, airports served by main-haul operation of Air Canada, terminated and seasonal routes.

== List of destinations served by Air Canada ==
Country/region	City	Airport	Notes	Refs
Algeria	Algiers	Houari Boumediene Airport	Seasonal	
Argentina	Buenos Aires	Ministro Pistarini International Airport		
Aruba	Oranjestad	Queen Beatrix International Airport	Resumes December 6, 2026	
Australia	Brisbane	Brisbane Airport		
Australia	Melbourne	Melbourne Airport	Terminated	
Australia	Sydney	Sydney Airport		
Austria	Vienna	Vienna International Airport		
Bahamas	George Town, Exuma	Exuma International Airport	Seasonal	
Bahamas	Freeport	Grand Bahama International Airport	Terminated	
Bahamas	Nassau	Lynden Pindling International Airport		
Bahamas	San Salvador	San Salvador Airport		
Barbados	Bridgetown	Grantley Adams International Airport		
Belgium	Brussels	Brussels Airport		
Bermuda	Hamilton	L.F. Wade International Airport		
Brazil	Rio de Janeiro	Rio de Janeiro/Galeão International Airport		
Brazil	São Paulo	São Paulo/Guarulhos International Airport		
Canada (Alberta)	Calgary	Calgary International Airport	Focus city	
Canada (Alberta)	Edmonton	Edmonton International Airport		
Canada (Alberta)	Edmonton	Edmonton City Centre Airport	Airport closed	
Canada (Alberta)	Fort McMurray	Fort McMurray International Airport		
Canada (British Columbia)	Abbotsford	Abbotsford International Airport	Terminated	
Canada (British Columbia)	Comox	Comox Valley Airport		
Canada (British Columbia)	Kelowna	Kelowna International Airport		
Canada (British Columbia)	Nanaimo	Nanaimo Airport		
Canada (British Columbia)	Vancouver	Vancouver International Airport	Hub	
Canada (British Columbia)	Victoria	Victoria International Airport		
Canada (Manitoba)	Winnipeg	Winnipeg James Armstrong Richardson International Airport		
Canada (New Brunswick)	Fredericton	Fredericton International Airport		
Canada (New Brunswick)	Moncton	Greater Moncton Roméo LeBlanc International Airport		
Canada (Newfoundland and Labrador)	Deer Lake	Deer Lake Regional Airport		
Canada (Newfoundland and Labrador)	St. John's	St. John's International Airport		
Canada (Northwest Territories)	Yellowknife	Yellowknife Airport		
Canada (Nova Scotia)	Halifax	Halifax Stanfield International Airport	Focus city	
Canada (Nova Scotia)	Sydney	JA Douglas McCurdy Sydney Airport		
Canada (Ontario)	Hamilton	John C. Munro Hamilton International Airport	Terminated	
Canada (Ontario)	Ottawa	Ottawa Macdonald–Cartier International Airport	Focus city	
Canada (Ontario)	Thunder Bay	Thunder Bay Airport		
Canada (Ontario)	Toronto	Toronto Pearson International Airport	Hub	
Canada (Quebec)	Montreal	Montréal–Trudeau International Airport	Hub	
Canada (Quebec)	Montreal	Montréal–Mirabel International Airport	Terminated	
Canada (Quebec)	Quebec City	Québec City Jean Lesage International Airport		
Canada (Saskatchewan)	Regina	Regina International Airport		
Canada (Saskatchewan)	Saskatoon	Saskatoon John G. Diefenbaker International Airport		
Canada (Yukon)	Whitehorse	Erik Nielsen Whitehorse International Airport		
Cayman Islands	George Town	Owen Roberts International Airport		
Chile	Santiago	Arturo Merino Benítez International Airport	Seasonal	
China	Beijing	Beijing Capital International Airport		
China	Guangzhou	Guangzhou Baiyun International Airport	Begins May 4, 2027	
China	Shanghai	Shanghai Pudong International Airport		
Colombia	Bogotá	El Dorado International Airport		
Colombia	Cartagena	Rafael Núñez International Airport		
Costa Rica	Liberia	Guanacaste Airport		
Costa Rica	San José	Juan Santamaría International Airport		
Croatia	Dubrovnik	Dubrovnik Airport	Begins May 11, 2027	
Croatia	Zagreb	Zagreb Airport	Terminated	
Cuba	Cayo Coco	Jardines del Rey Airport	Terminated	
Cuba	Cayo Largo del Sur	Vilo Acuña Airport	Terminated	
Cuba	Havana	José Martí International Airport	Terminated	
Cuba	Holguín	Frank País Airport	Terminated	
Cuba	Santa Clara	Abel Santamaría Airport	Terminated	
Cuba	Varadero	Juan Gualberto Gómez Airport	Terminated	
Czech Republic	Prague	Václav Havel Airport Prague	Seasonal	
Denmark	Copenhagen	Copenhagen Airport		
Dominican Republic	La Romana	La Romana International Airport		
Dominican Republic	Puerto Plata	Gregorio Luperón International Airport		
Dominican Republic	Punta Cana	Punta Cana International Airport		
Dominican Republic	Samana	Samaná El Catey International Airport		
Dominican Republic	Santo Domingo	Las Américas International Airport	Resumes December 10, 2026	
Ecuador	Quito	Mariscal Sucre International Airport	Begins December 5, 2026	
Egypt	Cairo	Cairo International Airport	Terminated	
France	Bordeaux	Bordeaux–Mérignac Airport	Terminated	
France	Fort-de-France	Martinique Aimé Césaire International Airport		
France	Lyon	Lyon–Saint-Exupéry Airport		
France	Nantes	Nantes Atlantique Airport	Seasonal	
France	Nice	Nice Côte d'Azur Airport	Seasonal	
France	Paris	Charles de Gaulle Airport		
France	Pointe-à-Pitre	Pointe-à-Pitre International Airport		
France	Toulouse	Toulouse–Blagnac Airport		
Germany	Berlin	Berlin Brandenburg Airport	Seasonal	
Germany	Berlin	Berlin Schönefeld Airport	Airport closed	
Germany	Berlin	Berlin Tegel Airport	Airport closed	
Germany	Düsseldorf	Düsseldorf Airport	Terminated	
Germany	Frankfurt	Frankfurt Airport		
Germany	Munich	Munich Airport		
Greece	Athens	Athens International Airport	Seasonal	
Grenada	St. George's	Maurice Bishop International Airport		
Guatemala	Guatemala City	La Aurora International Airport	Seasonal	
Haiti	Port-au-Prince	Toussaint Louverture International Airport	Terminated	
Honduras	Roatán	Juan Manuel Gálvez International Airport	Begins December 12, 2026	
Hong Kong	Hong Kong	Hong Kong International Airport		
Hong Kong	Hong Kong	Kai Tak Airport	Airport closed	
Hungary	Budapest	Budapest Ferenc Liszt International Airport	Seasonal	
Iceland	Reykjavík	Keflavík International Airport	Seasonal	
India	Delhi	Indira Gandhi International Airport		
India	Mumbai	Chhatrapati Shivaji Maharaj International Airport	Seasonal	
Ireland	Dublin	Dublin Airport		
Ireland	Shannon	Shannon Airport	Resumes June 10, 2027	
Israel	Tel Aviv	Ben Gurion Airport	Resumes November 30, 2026	
Italy	Catania	Catania–Fontanarossa Airport	Seasonal	
Italy	Milan	Milan Malpensa Airport		
Italy	Naples	Naples International Airport	Seasonal	
Italy	Rome	Rome Fiumicino Airport		
Italy	Venice	Venice Marco Polo Airport	Seasonal	
Jamaica	Kingston	Norman Manley International Airport		
Jamaica	Montego Bay	Sangster International Airport		
Japan	Nagoya	Chubu Centrair International Airport	Terminated	
Japan	Osaka	Kansai International Airport		
Japan	Sapporo	New Chitose Airport	Begins December 17, 2026	
Japan	Tokyo	Haneda Airport		
Japan	Tokyo	Narita International Airport		
Mexico	Acapulco	Acapulco International Airport	Terminated	
Mexico	Cancún	Cancún International Airport		
Mexico	Cozumel	Cozumel International Airport		
Mexico	Guadalajara	Guadalajara International Airport	Seasonal	
Mexico	Bahías de Huatulco	Bahías de Huatulco International Airport	Seasonal	
Mexico	Ixtapa/Zihuatanejo	Ixtapa-Zihuatanejo International Airport	Seasonal	
Mexico	Mérida	Mérida International Airport	Begins November 21, 2026	
Mexico	Mexico City	Mexico City International Airport		
Mexico	Monterrey	Monterrey International Airport		
Mexico	Puerto Vallarta	Licenciado Gustavo Díaz Ordaz International Airport		
Mexico	San José del Cabo	Los Cabos International Airport	Seasonal	
Mexico	Tulum	Tulum International Airport	Seasonal	
Morocco	Casablanca	Mohammed V International Airport		
Netherlands	Amsterdam	Amsterdam Airport Schiphol		
New Zealand	Auckland	Auckland Airport	Seasonal	
Norway	Oslo	Oslo Gardermoen Airport	Begins June 2, 2027	
Panama	Panama City	Tocumen International Airport	Terminated	
Peru	Lima	Jorge Chávez International Airport		
Philippines	Manila	Ninoy Aquino International Airport		
Poland	Warsaw	Warsaw Chopin Airport	Terminated	
Portugal	Lisbon	Lisbon Airport		
Portugal	Ponta Delgada	John Paul II Ponta Delgada Airport	Seasonal	
Portugal	Porto	Porto Airport	Seasonal	
Qatar	Doha	Hamad International Airport	Terminated	
Russia	Moscow	Sheremetyevo International Airport	Terminated	
Saint Kitts and Nevis	Basseterre	Robert L. Bradshaw International Airport		
Saint Lucia	Vieux-Fort	Hewanorra International Airport		
St. Vincent & the Grenadines	St. Vincent	Argyle International Airport		
Singapore	Singapore	Changi Airport		
Sint Maarten	Philipsburg	Princess Juliana International Airport	Seasonal	
South Korea	Seoul	Gimpo International Airport	Terminated	
South Korea	Seoul	Incheon International Airport		
Spain	Barcelona	Josep Tarradellas Barcelona–El Prat Airport		
Spain	Madrid	Madrid–Barajas Airport		
Spain	Palma de Mallorca	Palma de Mallorca Airport	Seasonal	
Spain	Tenerife	Tenerife South Airport		
Sweden	Stockholm	Stockholm Arlanda Airport	Seasonal	
Switzerland	Geneva	Geneva Airport		
Switzerland	Zurich	Zurich Airport		
Switzerland; France; Germany	Basel; Mulhouse; Freiburg	EuroAirport Basel Mulhouse Freiburg	Begins June 16, 2027	
Taiwan	Taipei	Taoyuan International Airport	Terminated	
Thailand	Bangkok	Suvarnabhumi Airport		
Trinidad and Tobago	Port of Spain	Piarco International Airport		
Turkey	Istanbul	Atatürk Airport	Airport closed	
Turks and Caicos Islands	Providenciales	Providenciales International Airport		
United Arab Emirates	Dubai	Dubai International Airport	Suspended until January 18, 2027	
United Kingdom	Edinburgh	Edinburgh Airport	Seasonal	
United Kingdom	Glasgow	Glasgow Airport	Terminated	
United Kingdom	London	Gatwick Airport	Terminated	
United Kingdom	London	Heathrow Airport		
United Kingdom	Manchester	Manchester Airport		
United States	Anchorage	Ted Stevens Anchorage International Airport	Seasonal	
United States	Atlanta	Hartsfield–Jackson Atlanta International Airport		
United States	Austin	Austin–Bergstrom International Airport		
United States	Boston	Logan International Airport		
United States	Charleston	Charleston International Airport	Terminated	
United States	Charlotte	Charlotte Douglas International Airport		
United States	Chicago	O'Hare International Airport		
United States	Cleveland	Cleveland Hopkins International Airport		
United States	Columbia	Columbia Metropolitan Airport	Terminated	
United States	Columbus	John Glenn Columbus International Airport		
United States	Dallas/Fort Worth	Dallas Fort Worth International Airport		
United States	Denver	Denver International Airport		
United States	Fort Lauderdale	Fort Lauderdale–Hollywood International Airport		
United States	Fort Myers	Southwest Florida International Airport		
United States	Honolulu	Daniel K. Inouye International Airport		
United States	Houston	George Bush Intercontinental Airport		
United States	Jacksonville	Jacksonville International Airport		
United States	Kahului	Kahului Airport	Seasonal	
United States	Kona	Kona International Airport	Seasonal	
United States	Las Vegas	Harry Reid International Airport		
United States	Lihue	Lihue Airport	Terminated	
United States	Los Angeles	Los Angeles International Airport		
United States	Memphis	Memphis International Airport	Terminated	
United States	Miami	Miami International Airport		
United States	Minneapolis–Saint Paul	Minneapolis–Saint Paul International Airport	Seasonal	
United States	Myrtle Beach	Myrtle Beach International Airport	Terminated	
United States	Newark	Newark Liberty International Airport		
United States	New York City	John F. Kennedy International Airport		
United States	New York City	LaGuardia Airport		
United States	Ontario	LA/Ontario International Airport	Terminated	
United States	Santa Ana	John Wayne Airport		
United States	Orlando	Orlando International Airport		
United States	Palm Springs	Palm Springs International Airport	Seasonal	
United States	Philadelphia	Philadelphia International Airport	Seasonal	
United States	Phoenix	Phoenix Sky Harbor International Airport		
United States	Portland	Portland International Airport		
United States	Raleigh/Durham	Raleigh–Durham International Airport	Seasonal	
United States	Richmond	Richmond International Airport	Terminated	
United States	Salt Lake City	Salt Lake City International Airport	Seasonal	
United States	Sacramento	Sacramento International Airport	Seasonal	
United States	San Antonio	San Antonio International Airport		
United States	San Diego	San Diego International Airport	Seasonal	
United States	San Francisco	San Francisco International Airport		
United States	San Jose, CA	Norman Y. Mineta San Jose International Airport	Terminated	
United States	San Juan	Luis Muñoz Marín International Airport		
United States	Seattle	Seattle–Tacoma International Airport		
United States	St. Louis	St. Louis Lambert International Airport		
United States	Tampa	Tampa International Airport		
United States	Vail	Eagle County Regional Airport	Terminated	
United States	Washington, D.C.	Dulles International Airport		
United States	Washington, D.C.	Ronald Reagan Washington National Airport		
United States	West Palm Beach	President Donald J. Trump International Airport	Seasonal	
Venezuela	Caracas	Simón Bolívar International Airport	Terminated	
Venezuela	Porlamar	Santiago Mariño Caribbean International Airport	Terminated	

== List of destinations served by Air Canada Cargo ==
Country	City	Airport	Notes	Refs
Belgium	Liège	Liège Airport		
Canada	Halifax	Halifax Stanfield International Airport		
Canada	Montreal	Montréal–Trudeau International Airport	Hub	
Canada	St. John's	St. John's International Airport		
Canada	Toronto	Toronto Pearson International Airport	Hub	
Canada	Vancouver	Vancouver International Airport	Hub	
Costa Rica	San José	Juan Santamaría International Airport		
Ecuador	Quito	Mariscal Sucre International Airport		
Germany	Cologne	Cologne Bonn Airport		
Germany	Frankfurt	Frankfurt Airport		
Mexico	Guadalajara	Guadalajara International Airport		
Mexico	Mexico City	Felipe Ángeles International Airport		
Mexico	Mexico City	Mexico City International Airport	Terminated	
Peru	Lima	Jorge Chávez International Airport		
Puerto Rico	San Juan	Luis Muñoz Marín International Airport		
Spain	Madrid	Adolfo Suárez Madrid–Barajas Airport		
Switzerland; France; Germany	Basel; Mulhouse; Freiburg	EuroAirport Basel Mulhouse Freiburg		
Turkey	Istanbul	Istanbul Airport		
United States	Atlanta	Hartsfield–Jackson Atlanta International Airport		
United States	Chicago	O'Hare International Airport		
United States	Dallas	Dallas Fort Worth International Airport		
United States	Miami	Miami International Airport		

== List of destinations served by Air Canada Rouge ==
Country	City	Airport	Notes	Refs
Algeria	Algiers	Houari Boumediene Airport	Terminated	
Antigua and Barbuda	St. John's	V. C. Bird International Airport		
Bahamas	San Salvador	San Salvador Airport		
Bahamas	Nassau	Lynden Pindling International Airport		
Barbados	Bridgetown	Grantley Adams International Airport		
Belize	Belize City	Philip S. W. Goldson International Airport	Seasonal	
Bermuda	Hamilton	L.F. Wade International Airport		
Canada	Abbotsford	Abbotsford International Airport	Terminated	
Canada	Calgary	Calgary International Airport		
Canada	Charlottetown	Charlottetown Airport		
Canada	Deer Lake	Deer Lake Regional Airport		
Canada	Edmonton	Edmonton International Airport		
Canada	Fort McMurray	Fort McMurray International Airport		
Canada	Fredericton	Fredericton International Airport	Seasonal	
Canada	Halifax	Halifax Stanfield International Airport		
Canada	Hamilton	John C. Munro Hamilton International Airport	Terminated	
Canada	Kamloops	Kamloops Airport		
Canada	Kelowna	Kelowna International Airport		
Canada	Montréal	Montréal–Trudeau International Airport	Hub	
Canada	Moncton	Greater Moncton Roméo LeBlanc International Airport	Seasonal	
Canada	Nanaimo	Nanaimo Airport	Seasonal	
Canada	Ottawa	Ottawa Macdonald–Cartier International Airport	Seasonal	
Canada	Quebec City	Québec City Jean Lesage International Airport		
Canada	Regina	Regina International Airport		
Canada	Saint John	Saint John Airport	Seasonal	
Canada	St. John's	St. John's International Airport		
Canada	Saskatoon	Saskatoon John G. Diefenbaker International Airport		
Canada	Sydney	JA Douglas McCurdy Sydney Airport	Seasonal	
Canada	Thunder Bay	Thunder Bay Airport	Seasonal	
Canada	Toronto	Toronto Pearson International Airport	Hub	
Canada	Vancouver	Vancouver International Airport	Hub	
Canada	Victoria	Victoria International Airport		
Canada	Yellowknife	Yellowknife Airport		
Cayman Islands	George Town	Owen Roberts International Airport		
Colombia	Bogotá	El Dorado International Airport	Terminated	
Colombia	Cartagena	Rafael Núñez International Airport		
Costa Rica	Liberia	Daniel Oduber International Airport		
Costa Rica	San José	Juan Santamaría International Airport		
Croatia	Zagreb	Zagreb Airport	Terminated	
Cuba	Cayo Coco	Jardines del Rey Airport	Terminated	
Cuba	Cayo Largo del Sur	Vilo Acuña Airport	Terminated	
Cuba	Havana	José Martí International Airport	Terminated	
Cuba	Holguín	Frank País Airport	Terminated	
Cuba	Santa Clara	Abel Santamaría Airport	Terminated	
Cuba	Varadero	Juan Gualberto Gómez Airport	Terminated	
Curaçao	Curaçao	Hato International Airport		
Czech Republic	Prague	Václav Havel Airport Prague	Terminated	
Dominican Republic	La Romana	La Romana International Airport		
Dominican Republic	Puerto Plata	Gregorio Luperón International Airport		
Dominican Republic	Punta Cana	Punta Cana International Airport		
Dominican Republic	Santo Domingo	Las Américas International Airport		
Dominican Republic	Samana	Samaná El Catey International Airport		
Ecuador	Quito	Mariscal Sucre International Airport	Terminated	
France	Bordeaux	Bordeaux-Mérignac Airport	Terminated	
France	Marseille	Marseille Provence Airport	Terminated	
France	Nice	Nice Côte d'Azur Airport	Terminated	
Germany	Berlin	Berlin Brandenburg Airport	Terminated	
Germany	Berlin	Berlin Tegel Airport	Airport closed	
Greece	Athens	Athens International Airport	Terminated	
Grenada	St. George's	Maurice Bishop International Airport		
Haiti	Port-au-Prince	Toussaint Louverture International Airport	Terminated	
Hungary	Budapest	Budapest Ferenc Liszt International Airport	Terminated	
Iceland	Reykjavík	Keflavík International Airport		
Italy	Rome	Leonardo da Vinci–Fiumicino Airport	Terminated	
Italy	Venice	Venice Marco Polo Airport	Terminated	
Jamaica	Kingston	Norman Manley International Airport		
Jamaica	Montego Bay	Sangster International Airport		
Japan	Nagoya	Chubu Centrair International Airport	Terminated	
Japan	Osaka	Kansai International Airport	Terminated	
Mexico	Cancún	Cancún International Airport		
Mexico	Cozumel	Cozumel International Airport		
Mexico	Huatulco	Bahías de Huatulco International Airport		
Mexico	Ixtapa	Ixtapa-Zihuatanejo International Airport	Seasonal	
Mexico	Mexico City	Mexico City International Airport		
Mexico	Puerto Escondido	Puerto Escondido International Airport	Seasonal	
Mexico	Puerto Vallarta	Licenciado Gustavo Díaz Ordaz International Airport		
Mexico	San José del Cabo	Los Cabos International Airport		
Mexico	Tulum	Tulum International Airport		
Morocco	Casablanca	Mohammed V International Airport	Terminated	
Panamá	Panama City	Tocumen International Airport	Terminated	
Peru	Lima	Jorge Chávez International Airport	Terminated	
Poland	Warsaw	Warsaw Frédéric Chopin International Airport	Terminated	
Portugal	Lisbon	Lisbon Airport	Terminated	
Portugal	Porto	Porto Airport	Terminated	
Puerto Rico	San Juan	Luis Muñoz Marín Airport	Seasonal	
Romania	Bucharest	Henri Coanda International Airport	Terminated	
Saint Kitts and Nevis	Basseterre	Robert L. Bradshaw International Airport	Seasonal	
Sint Maarten	Philipsburg	Princess Juliana International Airport		
Spain	Barcelona	Josep Tarradellas Barcelona-El Prat Airport	Terminated	
Saint Kitts and Nevis	Basseterre	Robert L. Bradshaw International Airport	Seasonal	
St. Lucia	Vieux Fort	Hewanorra International Airport		
St. Vincent & the Grenadines	St. Vincent	Argyle International Airport		
Trinidad and Tobago	Port of Spain	Piarco International Airport		
Turks and Caicos Islands	Providenciales	Providenciales International Airport		
United Kingdom	Edinburgh	Edinburgh Airport	Terminated	
United Kingdom	Glasgow	Glasgow Airport	Terminated	
United Kingdom	London	Gatwick Airport	Terminated	
United Kingdom	Manchester	Manchester Airport	Terminated	
United States	Anchorage	Ted Stevens Anchorage International Airport		
United States	Austin	Austin–Bergstrom International Airport	Seasonal	
United States	Fort Lauderdale	Fort Lauderdale–Hollywood International Airport		
United States	Fort Myers	Southwest Florida International Airport		
United States	Honolulu	Daniel K. Inouye International Airport		
United States	Kahului	Kahului Airport		
United States	Kona	Kona International Airport		
United States	Las Vegas	Harry Reid International Airport		
United States	Los Angeles	Los Angeles International Airport		
United States	Miami	Miami International Airport		
United States	Nashville	Nashville International Airport		
United States	New Orleans	Louis Armstrong New Orleans International Airport		
United States	Orlando	Orlando International Airport		
United States	Palm Springs	Palm Springs International Airport	Seasonal	
United States	Phoenix	Phoenix Sky Harbor International Airport		
United States	Portland	Portland International Airport	Terminated	
United States	San Diego	San Diego International Airport		
United States	San Francisco	San Francisco International Airport		
United States	Sarasota	Sarasota–Bradenton International Airport	Seasonal	
United States	Tampa	Tampa International Airport		
United States	West Palm Beach	Palm Beach International Airport		

== List of destinations served by Air Canada Express ==
Country	City	Airport	Notes	Refs
Canada	Abbotsford	Abbotsford International Airport	Terminated	
Canada	Bagotville	Bagotville Airport		
Canada	Baie-Comeau	Baie-Comeau Airport	Terminated	
Canada	Bathurst	Bathurst Airport	Terminated	
Canada	Calgary	Calgary International Airport	Focus city	
Canada	Campbell River	Campbell River Airport	Terminated	
Canada	Castlegar	West Kootenay Regional Airport		
Canada	Charlottetown	Charlottetown Airport		
Canada	Comox	Comox Airport		
Canada	Cranbrook	Cranbrook/Canadian Rockies International Airport		
Canada	Deer Lake	Deer Lake Regional Airport		
Canada	Edmonton	Edmonton International Airport		
Canada	Fort McMurray	Fort McMurray International Airport		
Canada	Fort St. John	Fort St. John Airport		
Canada	Fredericton	Fredericton International Airport		
Canada	Gander	Gander International Airport		
Canada	Gaspé	Michel-Pouliot Gaspé Airport	Terminated	
Canada	Grande Prairie	Grande Prairie Airport		
Canada	Halifax	Halifax Stanfield International Airport	Focus city	
Canada	Hamilton	John C. Munro Hamilton International Airport	Terminated	
Canada	Happy Valley-Goose Bay	Goose Bay Airport		
Canada	Îles de la Madeleine	Îles-de-la-Madeleine Airport	Seasonal	
Canada	Iqaluit	Iqaluit Airport	Terminated	
Canada	Kamloops	Kamloops Airport		
Canada	Kelowna	Kelowna International Airport		
Canada	Kingston	Kingston Norman Rogers Airport	Terminated	
Canada	Lethbridge	Lethbridge Airport	Terminated	
Canada	London	London International Airport		
Canada	Medicine Hat	Medicine Hat Airport	Terminated	
Canada	Moncton	Greater Moncton Roméo LeBlanc International Airport		
Canada	Mont-Joli	Mont-Joli Airport	Terminated	
Canada	Mont-Tremblant	Mont Tremblant International Airport	Terminated	
Canada	Montreal	Montréal-Trudeau International Airport	Hub	
Canada	Nanaimo	Nanaimo Airport		
Canada	North Bay	North Bay/Jack Garland Airport	Terminated	
Canada	Ottawa	Ottawa/Macdonald-Cartier International Airport	Focus city	
Canada	Penticton	Penticton Regional Airport	Terminated	
Canada	Prince George	Prince George Airport		
Canada	Prince Rupert	Prince Rupert Airport		
Canada	Quebec City	Québec/Jean Lesage International Airport		
Canada	Quesnel	Quesnel Airport	Terminated	
Canada	Red Deer	Red Deer Regional Airport	Terminated	
Canada	Regina	Regina International Airport		
Canada	Rouyn-Noranda	Rouyn-Noranda Airport		
Canada	Saint John	Saint John Airport		
Canada	Saint-Léonard	Saint-Léonard Aerodrome	Terminated	
Canada	Sandspit	Sandspit Airport		
Canada	Sarnia	Sarnia Chris Hadfield Airport	Terminated	
Canada	Saskatoon	Saskatoon/John G. Diefenbaker International Airport		
Canada	Sault Ste. Marie	Sault Ste. Marie Airport		
Canada	Sept-Îles	Sept-Îles Airport		
Canada	Smithers	Smithers Airport		
Canada	Stephenville	Stephenville International Airport	Terminated	
Canada	St. John's	St. John's International Airport		
Canada	Sudbury	Greater Sudbury Airport		
Canada	Sydney	J.A. Douglas McCurdy Sydney Airport		
Canada	Terrace	Northwest Regional Airport Terrace-Kitimat		
Canada	Thunder Bay	Thunder Bay Airport		
Canada	Timmins	Timmins/Victor M. Power Airport		
Canada	Toronto	Billy Bishop Toronto City Airport		
Canada	Toronto	Toronto Pearson International Airport	Hub	
Canada	Val-d'Or	Val-d'Or Airport	Terminated	
Canada	Vancouver	Vancouver International Airport	Hub	
Canada	Victoria	Victoria International Airport		
Canada	Wabush	Wabush Airport	Terminated	
Canada	Whitehorse	Erik Nielsen Whitehorse International Airport		
Canada	Williams Lake	Williams Lake Airport	Terminated	
Canada	Windsor	Windsor International Airport		
Canada	Winnipeg	Winnipeg James Armstrong Richardson International Airport		
Canada	Yarmouth	Yarmouth Airport	Terminated	
Canada	Yellowknife	Yellowknife Airport		
United States	Albany	Albany International Airport	Terminated	
United States	Allentown	Lehigh Valley International Airport	Terminated	
United States	Atlanta	Hartsfield–Jackson Atlanta International Airport		
United States	Atlantic City	Atlantic City International Airport	Terminated	
United States	Austin	Austin-Bergstrom International Airport	Terminated	
United States	Baltimore	Baltimore/Washington International Airport	Terminated	
United States	Boston	Boston Logan International Airport		
United States	Charleston (SC)	Charleston International Airport		
United States	Charlotte	Charlotte Douglas International Airport		
United States	Chicago	Chicago O'Hare International Airport		
United States	Cincinnati/Covington	Cincinnati/Northern Kentucky International Airport		
United States	Cleveland	Cleveland Hopkins International Airport		
United States	Columbus	John Glenn Columbus International Airport		
United States	Dallas/Fort Worth	Dallas Fort Worth International Airport	Seasonal	
United States	Dayton	Dayton International Airport	Terminated	
United States	Denver	Denver International Airport		
United States	Detroit	Detroit Metropolitan Wayne County Airport		
United States	Fresno	Fresno Yosemite International Airport	Terminated	
United States	Grand Rapids	Gerald R. Ford International Airport	Terminated	
United States	Harrisburg	Harrisburg International Airport	Terminated	
United States	Hartford	Bradley International Airport	Terminated	
United States	Houston	George Bush International Airport		
United States	Indianapolis	Indianapolis International Airport		
United States	Jacksonville	Jacksonville International Airport		
United States	Kansas City	Kansas City International Airport	Terminated	
United States	Las Vegas	Harry Reid International Airport		
United States	Los Angeles	Los Angeles International Airport		
United States	Manchester	Manchester-Boston Regional Airport	Terminated	
United States	Memphis	Memphis International Airport	Terminated	
United States	Midland/Odessa	Midland International Air and Space Port		
United States	Milwaukee	Milwaukee Mitchell International Airport	Terminated	
United States	Minneapolis–Saint Paul	Minneapolis–Saint Paul International Airport		
United States	Nashville	Nashville International Airport		
United States	Newark	Newark Liberty International Airport		
United States	New Orleans	Louis Armstrong International Airport	Terminated	
United States	New York City	John F. Kennedy International Airport		
United States	New York City	LaGuardia Airport		
United States	Norfolk	Norfolk International Airport	Terminated	
United States	Omaha	Eppley Airfield	Terminated	
United States	Palm Springs	Palm Springs International Airport		
United States	Philadelphia	Philadelphia International Airport		
United States	Phoenix	Phoenix Sky Harbor International Airport	Seasonal	
United States	Pittsburgh	Pittsburgh International Airport		
United States	Portland (ME)	Portland International Jetport	Terminated	
United States	Portland (OR)	Portland International Airport		
United States	Providence	Rhode Island T. F. Green International Airport	Terminated	
United States	Raleigh/Durham	Raleigh-Durham International Airport		
United States	Richmond	Richmond International Airport	Terminated	
United States	Rochester	Greater Rochester International Airport	Terminated	
United States	Sacramento	Sacramento International Airport		
United States	San Antonio	San Antonio International Airport	Terminated	
United States	San Diego	San Diego International Airport		
United States	San Jose	Norman Y. Mineta San José International Airport	Terminated	
United States	San Francisco	San Francisco International Airport		
United States	Savannah	Savannah/Hilton Head International Airport	Terminated	
United States	Seattle/Tacoma	Seattle–Tacoma International Airport		
United States	St. Louis	St. Louis Lambert International Airport		
United States	Syracuse	Syracuse Hancock International Airport	Terminated	
United States	Washington D.C.	Ronald Reagan Washington National Airport		
United States	Washington D.C.	Washington Dulles International Airport		
United States	White Plains	Westchester County Airport	Terminated	
