= Great North Airlines =

Canadian charter airline

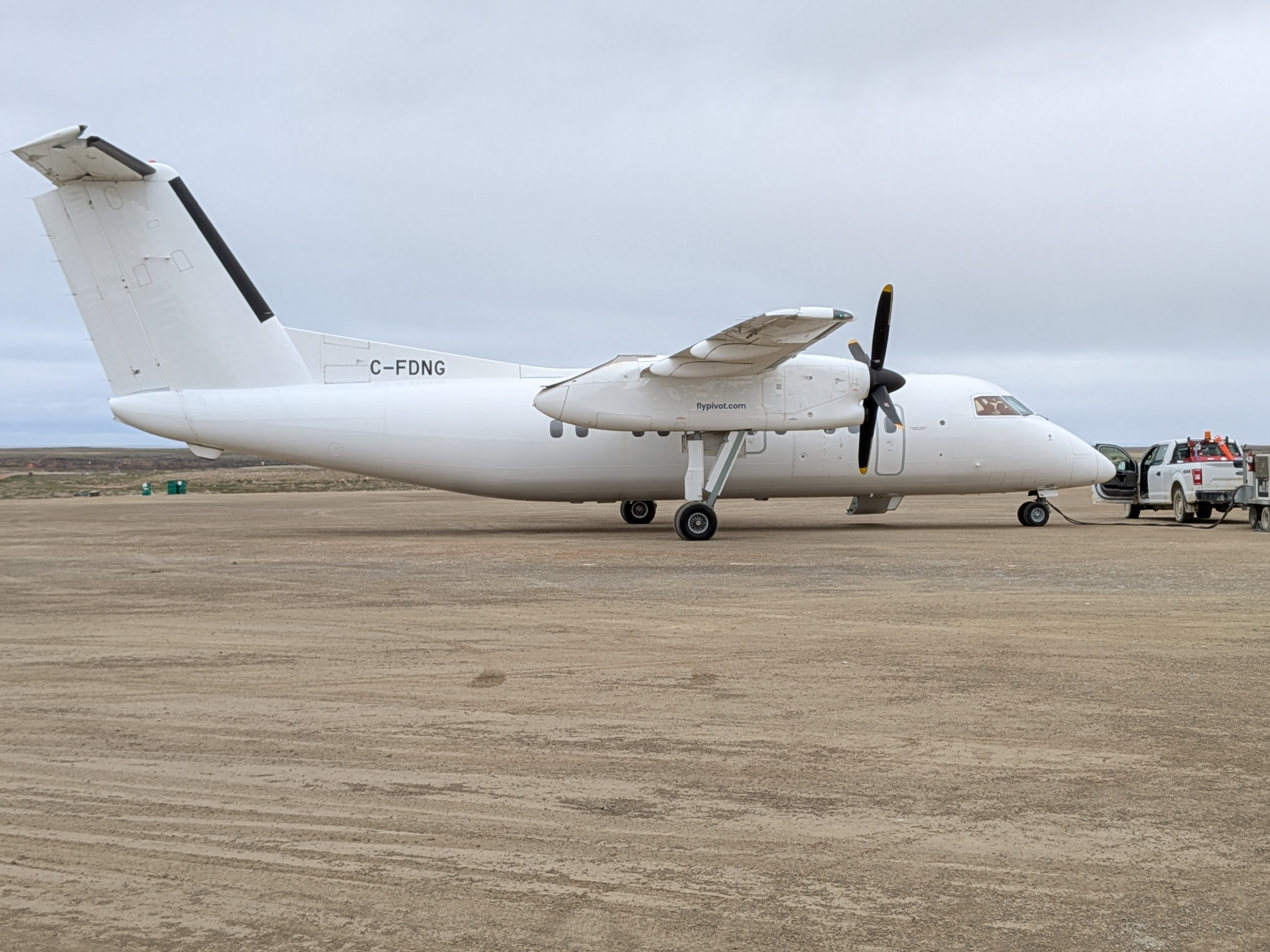
- Great North Airlines Dash 8-100
IATA	ICAO	Call sign
—	GGN	GREAT NORTH
- Founded: 2020; 6 years ago
- AOC #: Canada: 19227; United States: SMQF162F
- Operating bases: Toronto–Pearson
- Fleet size: 3
- Destinations: Planned: Ottawa, Montreal, Toronto, Waterloo and Windsor
- Headquarters: Mississauga, Ontario
- Key people: Eric Edmondson (CEO); Brock Henderson (VP Operations Control)
- Website: www.greatnorthairlines.com

2746904 Ontario Inc., doing business as Great North Airlines, and formerly as Pivot Airlines, is a Canadian charter airline, created in 2020 after purchasing the assets of defunct airline Air Georgian. In 2026, Pivot Airlines rebranded to Great North Airlines. Its air operator certificate allows for the operation of CRJ-100/200 and Dash-8 series aircraft. It is headed at Region of Waterloo International Airport in Breslau.

In 2022, a Pivot Airlines charter flight was found to have millions of dollars' worth of cocaine onboard after landing in the Dominican Republic, and the crew on the flight were detained for 8 months due to the incident.

The airline rebranded as Great North Airlines in January 2026.

== Former destinations ==
Destinations
Country	Province	City	Airport	Notes	Refs
Canada	Ontario	Ottawa	Ottawa Macdonald–Cartier International Airport		
Canada	Ontario	Kitchener / Waterloo	Region of Waterloo International Airport	Base	
Canada	Quebec	Montreal	Montréal–Trudeau International Airport		

== Fleet ==
As of April 2026, Great North Airlines operates the following aircraft.

Great North Airlines fleet
Aircraft	In service	Variants	Notes
Bombardier CRJ100/200	2	CRJ200	
De Havilland Canada Dash 8	2	DHC-8-102; DHC-8-311	One -315 variant on order
Total	4		
