= Air Canada Alliance =

Regional airline of Canada (2002–2011)

| IATA | ICAO | Call sign |
|---|---|---|
| ZX | GGN | GEORGIAN |
- Commenced operations: 2002
- Ceased operations: 2011 (merged into Air Canada Express)
- Hubs: Calgary; Halifax; Toronto–Pearson
- Frequent-flyer program: Aeroplan (Air Canada)
- Alliance: Star Alliance (affiliate)
- Parent company: Air Canada

Air Canada Alliance was a brand name under which Air Georgian operated short-haul flights on behalf of Air Canada. The Air Canada Alliance was used from 2002, until Air Canada Express was formed in 2011. Air Georgian operated a fleet of Beechcraft 1900Ds on behalf of Air Canada Alliance. Air Canada Alliance operated from three bases in Calgary, Toronto–Pearson, and Halifax. Air Canada Alliance was designed to allow passengers connecting through one of their three base airports to fly short connecting flights to nearby airports; for example from Toronto, Ontario to Syracuse, New York.

== Operators and fleet ==
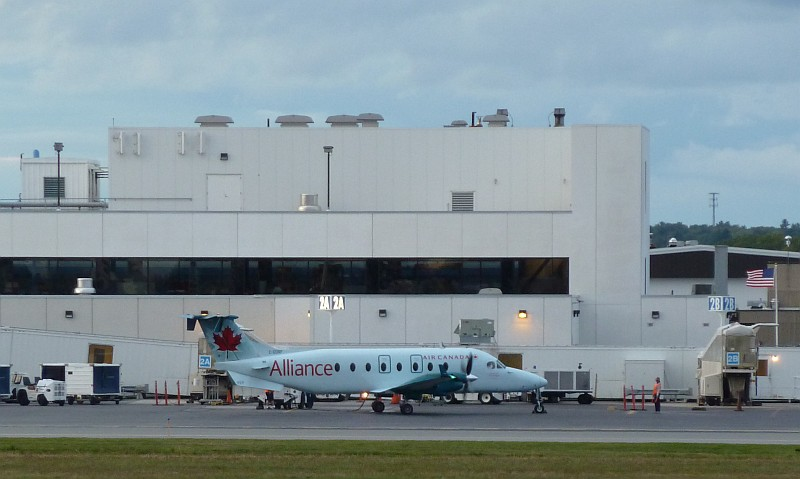
Air Georgian Beechcraft 1900D in Air Canada Alliance livery.

Air Canada Alliance Fleet
| Airline | IATA Service | ICAO Code | Callsign | Aircraft | Passengers | Parent |
|---|---|---|---|---|---|---|
| Air Georgian | ZX | GGN | Georgian | Beechcraft 1900D | 18 | Georgian International |
