= Air Georgian =

Canadian airline

Air Georgian Limited

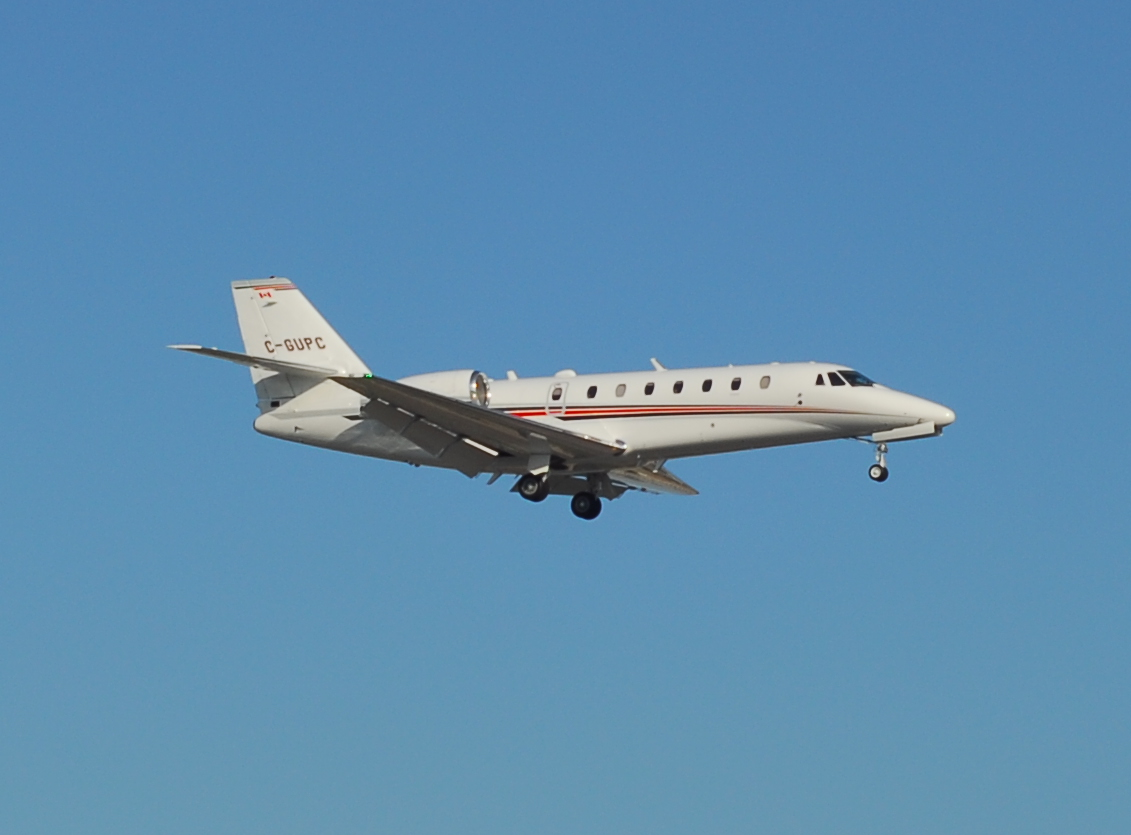
- A Cessna Citation Sovereign formerly owned by Air Georgian
| IATA | ICAO | Call sign |
|---|---|---|
| ZX | GGN | GEORGIAN |
- Founded: 1994
- Ceased operations: May 29, 2020
- AOC #: Canada 5559; United States SMQF162F
- Headquarters: Shell Aerocentre at Toronto Pearson International Airport; Mississauga, Ontario
- Key people: Eric Edmondson (President & CEO); Troy Stephens (VP Flight Operations); Scott Monsen (VP Finance); Adeeb Haddadi (VP Maintenance)
- Website: www.airgeorgian.ca

Air Georgian Limited was a privately owned charter airline based at Toronto Pearson International Airport in Mississauga, Ontario, Canada. Between 2000 and 2020 its main business was its operation as Air Canada Express on a Tier III codeshare with Air Canada for scheduled services on domestic and trans-border routes. Starting in 2020 Air Georgian began focusing on air charters, before ceasing operations in May, after a sale of its assets to Pivot Airlines, a company run by the same executives.

Air Georgian operated under the Subparts 704 and 705 of the Canadian Aviation Regulations (CAR 704, CAR 705) and had completed the IATA Operational Safety Audit. Air Georgian pilots were represented by the Air Line Pilots Association (ALPA).

== History ==
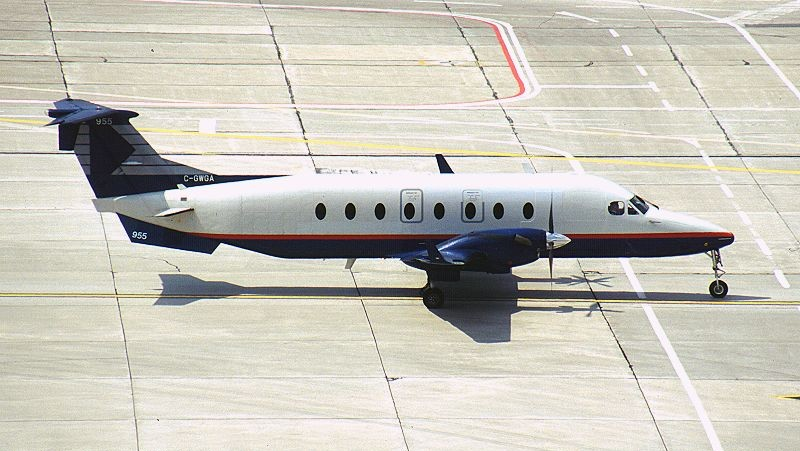
Air Georgian Beechcraft 1900D in Canadian Airlines livery

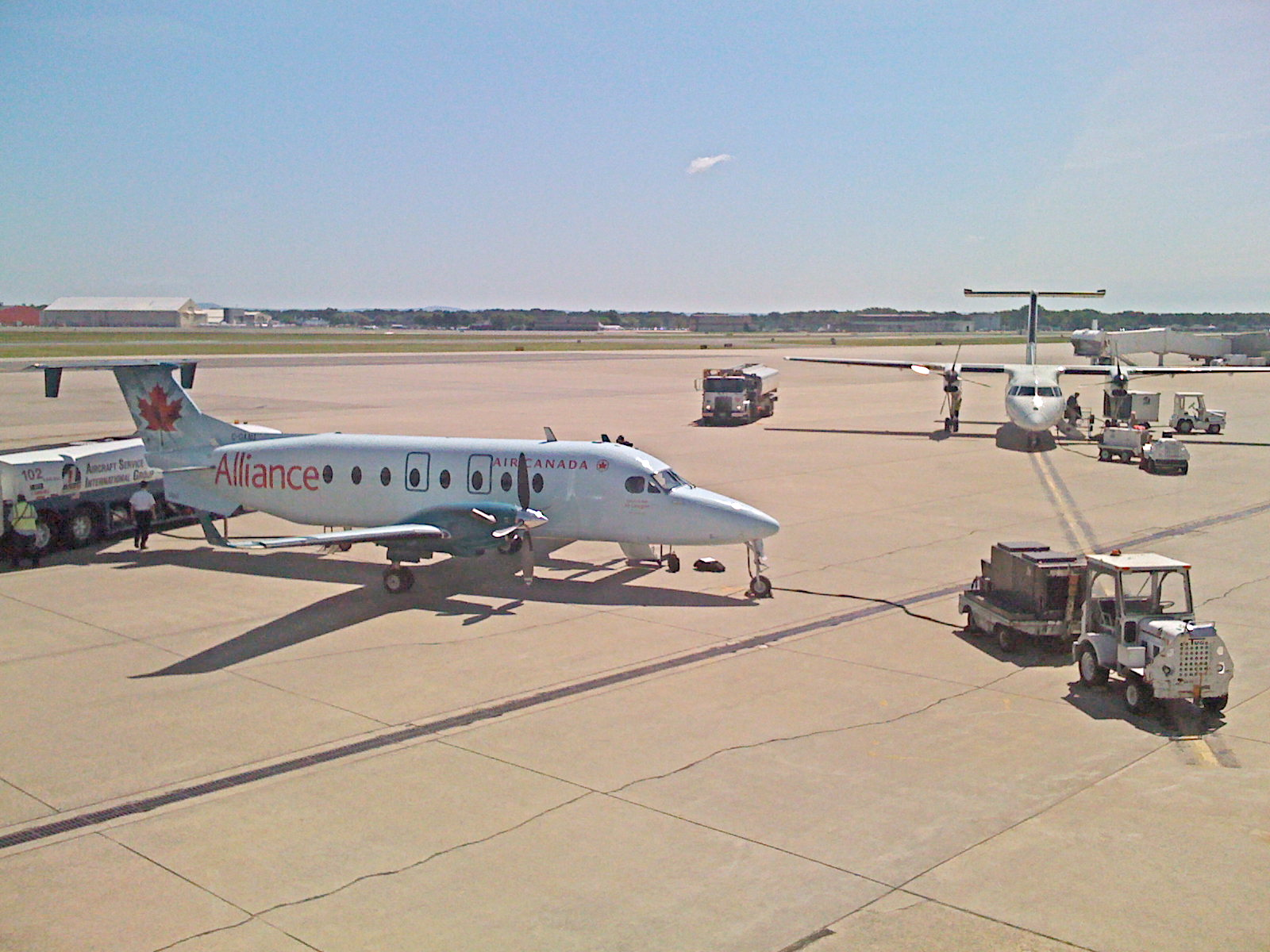
Air Georgian Beechcraft 1900D (left) at Bradley International Airport in the Air Canada Alliance livery

Air Georgian began as an airport developer in 1985. It began commercial operations in 1994 and subsequently developed its commercial air carrier business, which as of 2011 represented 87 percent of its total business. In 1997 It became a code share partner of Canadian Airlines, operating under the banner of Ontario Regional. Air Georgian was a partner of Canadian Airlines. In 2000 Air Georgian became a Tier III partner of Air Canada and operated as Air Canada Alliance.

It had a long time cargo operation known as Georgian Express which was sold to Cargojet in 2007.

On November 15, 2013, Air Georgian and Regional 1 merged operations through the creation of a parent company, Regional Express Aviation Ltd. (REAL), based in Calgary, Alberta. This joint venture ended in February 2016.

In December 2013, Air Canada announced that commencing in mid-2014, Air Georgian would operate additional routes in Canada and the United States using Air Canada CRJ100/200 aircraft. CRJ operations on behalf of Air Canada Express began on May 1, 2014.

In 2019, Air Canada indicated it was ending its relationship with the company, consolidating its CRJ regional capacity into the Jazz Aviation operation. On January 31, 2020, Air Georgian filed notice of intent for bankruptcy protection. On March 16, 2020, Air Georgian received court approval for an asset purchase agreement with Pivot Airlines (2746904 Ontario Inc) for substantially all the assets, properties and undertakings of the company. Pivot Airlines is a new company whose CEO as well as Maintenance Operations and Flight Operations Vice Presidents are the same as Air Georgian's. On May 29, 2020, the transaction was completed, however, the June 1 deadline to make a proposal to exit bankruptcy protection passed and no proposal having been made, the company was declared bankrupt the following day.

In the wake of the COVID-19 pandemic, Air Georgian had begun offering repatriation flights.

== Fleet ==
At the time of bankruptcy, the Canadian Civil Aircraft Register showed 14 aircraft registered for Air Georgian Limited. As of August 2021, Transport Canada shows that Air Georgian had operated the following 89 aircraft:

Former Air Georgian aircraft
| Aircraft | No. of aircraft | Variants | Notes |
|---|---|---|---|
| Beechcraft King Air | 2 | Model 90 series | An F90 and a C90GT |
| Beechcraft Super King Air | 1 | 300 Series | |
| Beechcraft 1900 | 22 | 1900C, 1900D | Two 1900C and twenty 1900D |
| Beechcraft Premier I | 2 | 390 | |
| Bombardier Challenger 600 series | 18 | 100 Series | Also listed as the Canadair CL-600 |
| Cessna 152 | 5 | | |
| Cessna 172 | 2 | 172M | |
| Cessna 180 Skywagon | 1 | 180K | |
| Cessna 185 Skywagon | 3 | A185F | |
| Cessna 206 | 12 | U206F, TU206G | See Cessna U206 |
| Cessna 208 Caravan | 7 | 208 Caravan, 208B Grand Caravan | Two 208s and five 208B |
| Cessna 414 | 1 | | |
| Cessna Citation II | 2 | Model 550 | |
| Cessna Citation Sovereign | 1 | Model 680 | |
| de Havilland Canada DHC-2 Beaver | 1 | DHC-2 MK. I | |
| Hawker 800 | 2 | Series 800, 800XP | One listed as a British Aerospace 125 |
| Pilatus PC-12 | 1 | PC-12/45 | |
| Piper PA-23 | 1 | PA-23-250 Aztec | |
| Piper PA-31 Navajo | 1 | PA-31-350 Chieftain | |
| Piper PA-32 Cherokee Six | 2 | PA-32-260, PA-32-300 | One of each |
| Piper PA-32R | 1 | PA-32RT-300T | |
| Piper PA-34 Seneca | 1 | PA-34-200T Seneca II | |
| Total | 89 | | |
