= Air Canada Express =

Regional airline of Canada

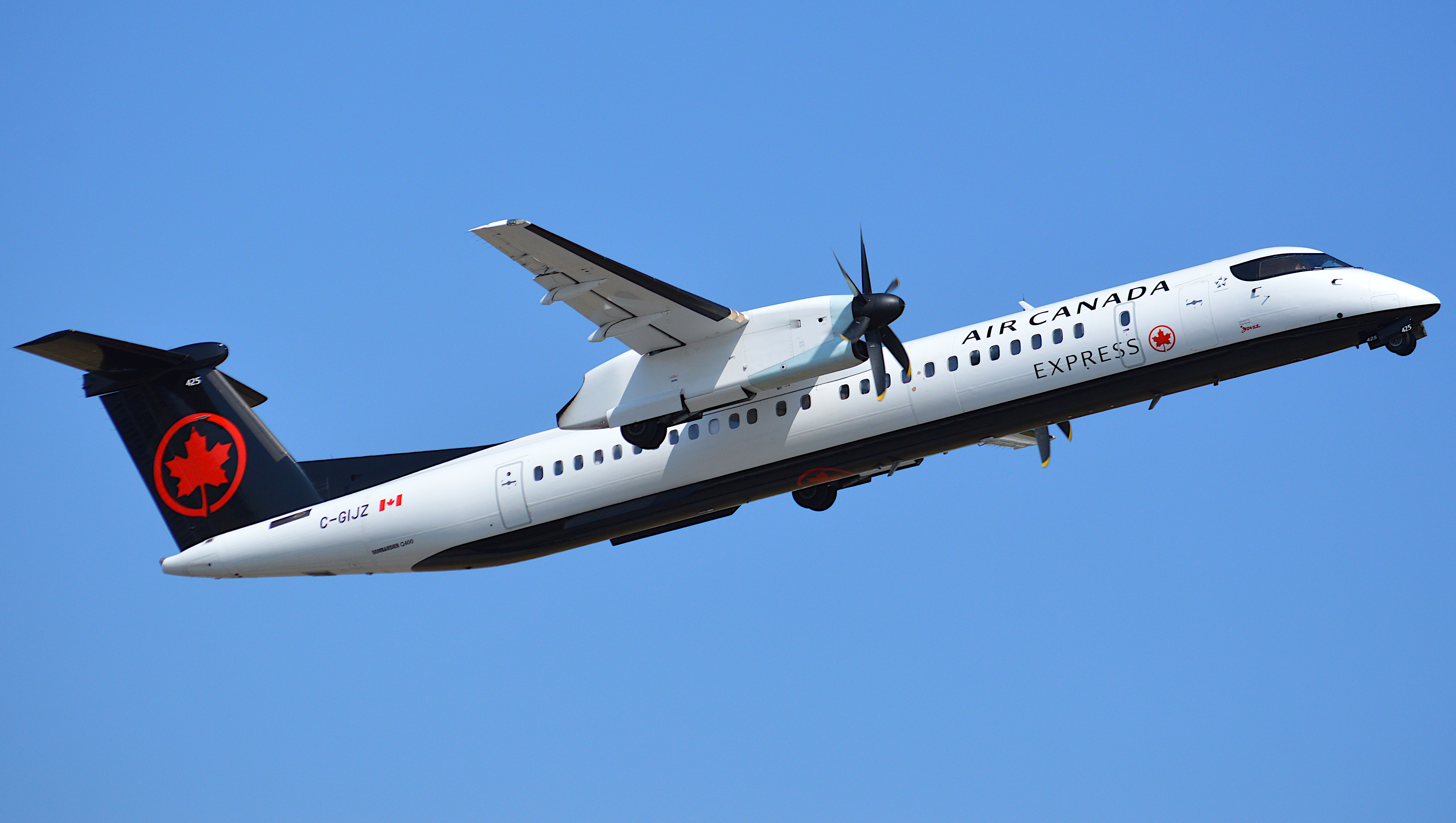
- An Air Canada Express De Havilland Canada Dash 8
IATA	ICAO	Call sign
AC	JZA / PVL	JAZZ / PROVINCIAL
- Founded: May 3, 2011; 15 years ago
- Hubs: Montréal–Trudeau; Toronto–Pearson; Vancouver
- Focus cities: Calgary; Halifax; Ottawa
- Frequent-flyer program: Aeroplan
- Alliance: Star Alliance (affiliate)
- Fleet size: 85
- Parent company: Air Canada
- Headquarters: Montreal, Quebec, Canada
- Website: www.aircanada.com

Air Canada Express is a brand name of regional feeder flights for Air Canada that are subcontracted to other airlines. Presently, Jazz Aviation and PAL Airlines are the sole operators of Air Canada Express flights. They primarily connect smaller cities with Air Canada's domestic hub airports and focus cities, although they offer some point-to-point and international service to the United States.

== History ==
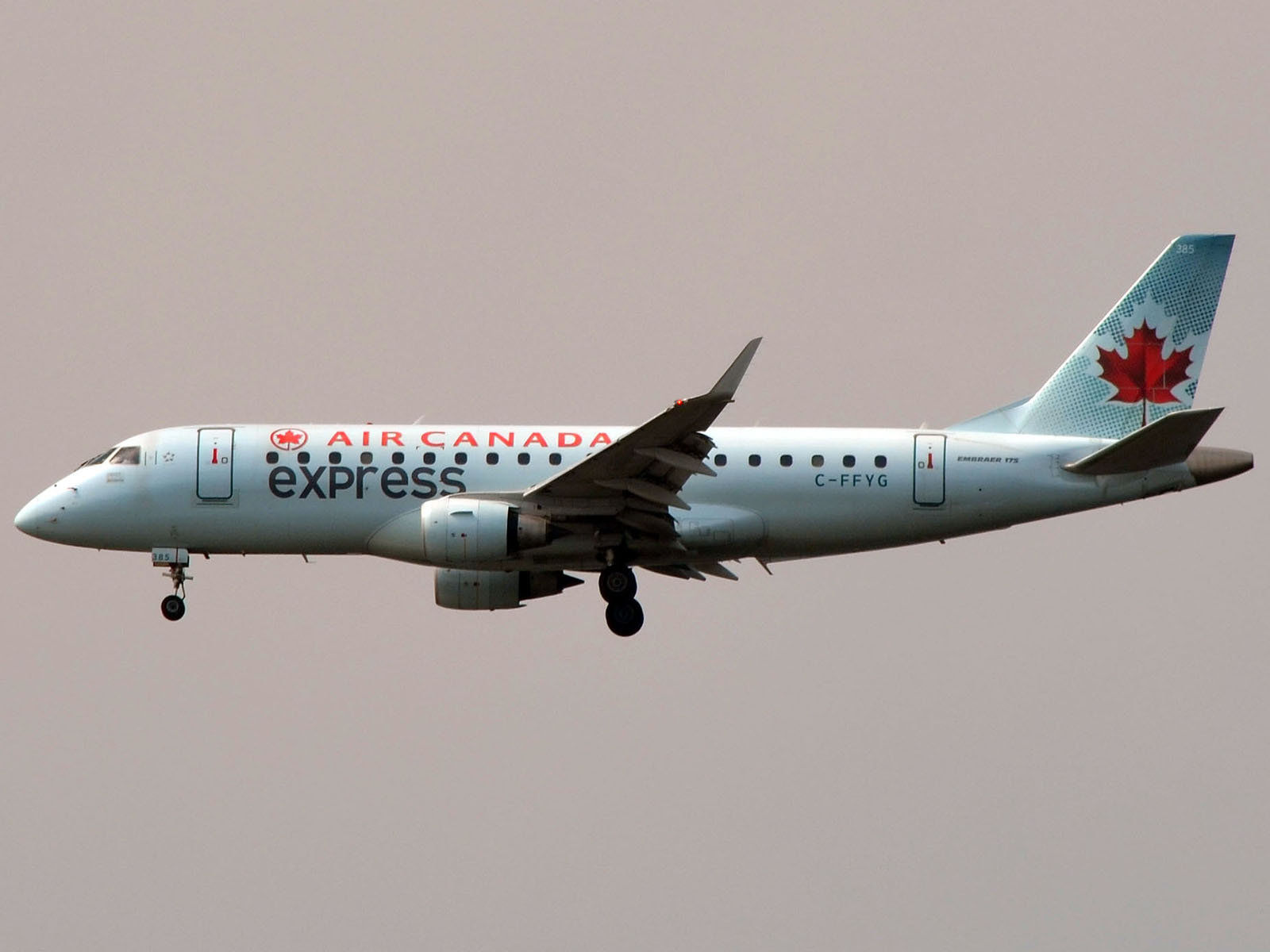
Air Canada Express Embraer E175 in a former livery

On April 26, 2011, Air Canada announced its intention to retire the Air Canada Jazz brand and create the Air Canada Express brand. Prior to establishing the Express name, the flights operated primarily under the Air Canada Jazz or Air Canada Alliance banners.

As of January 2020, Air Georgian no longer provided services under the capacity purchase agreement. Those services were transferred back to Jazz Aviation. On March 1, 2021, it was also announced that Sky Regional Airlines would also no longer provide services under the capacity purchase agreement and therefore Jazz Aviation would become the sole operator of the express brand.

However, in May 2023, Air Canada signed a letter of intent with PAL Airlines for a five-year capacity purchase agreement. This deal involved the purchase of up to six Bombardier Q400s from Air Canada, which PAL Airlines would operate under the Air Canada Express brand in addition to their existing schedule and charter business. In the announcement, Air Canada described the prospective agreement with PAL Airlines as a "bridging arrangement" due to a need for additional regional capacity as a result of industry-wide pilot shortages. Service with PAL began in July 2023. On January 9, 2026, Air Canada and PAL renewed the agreement through 2032, adding five additional Q400s into the fleet, as well as protecting services from Montréal–Trudeau to destinations in Quebec and New Brunswick.

== Fleet ==
=== Current fleet ===
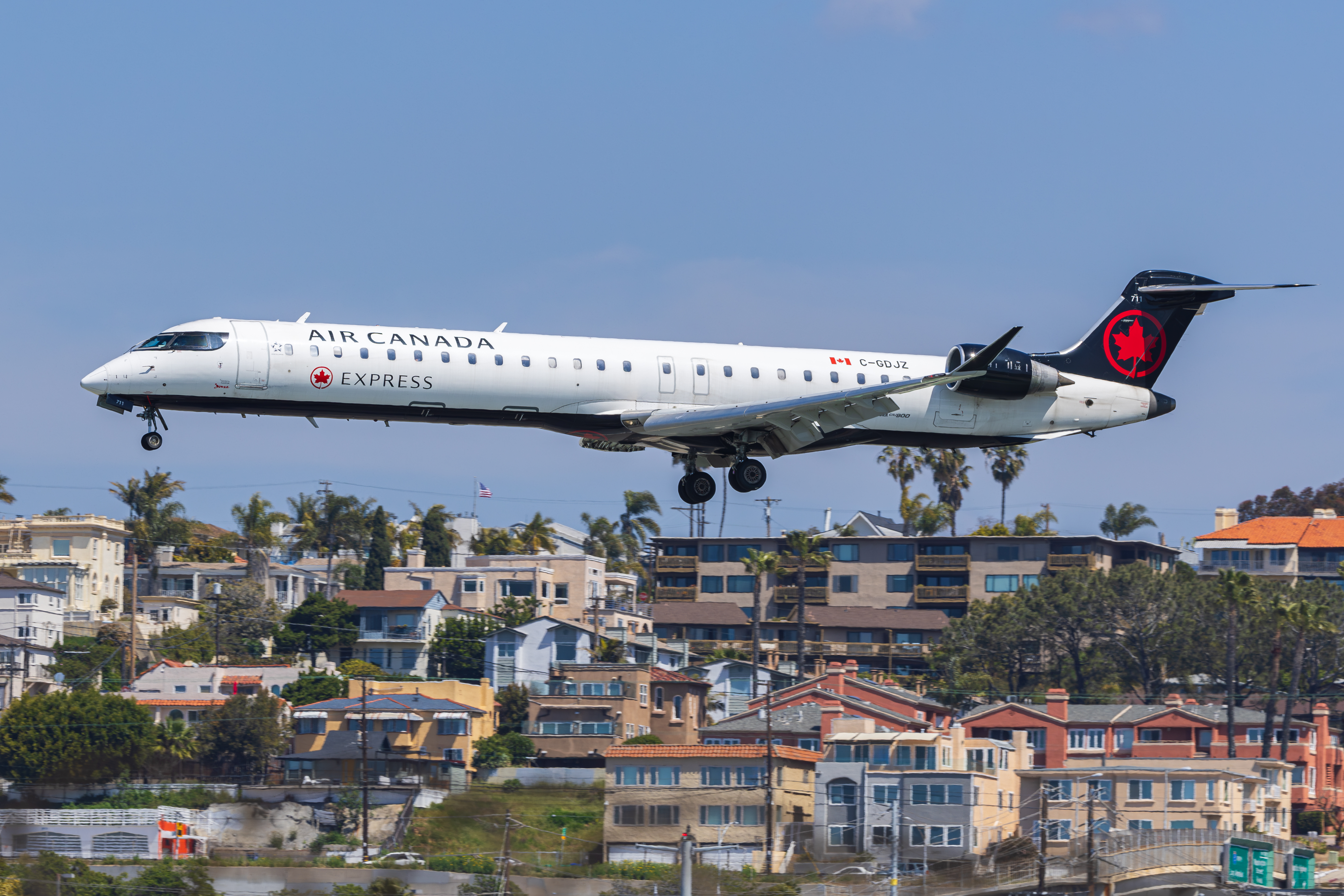
A Jazz Aviation Bombardier CRJ900 in Air Canada Express livery landing at San Diego International Airport in 2023

As of August 2026, the Air Canada Express fleet consists of the following aircraft:

Air Canada Express fleet
Operator	Aircraft	In service	Passengers			Notes
Operator	Aircraft	In service	J	Y	Total	Notes
Jazz Aviation	Bombardier CRJ900 (Note: Listed as "Mitsubishi CRJ900 (CR9)" on Air Canada website.)	31	12	64	76	To be retrofitted with new cabin by 2027.
Jazz Aviation	De Havilland Canada Dash 8-400	31	–	78	78	To be retrofitted with new cabin by 2026.
Jazz Aviation	Embraer 175	25	12	64	76	To be retrofitted with new cabin by 2027.
PAL Airlines	De Havilland Canada Dash 8-400	10	–	76	76	To be retrofitted with new cabin by 2026.
Total		101				

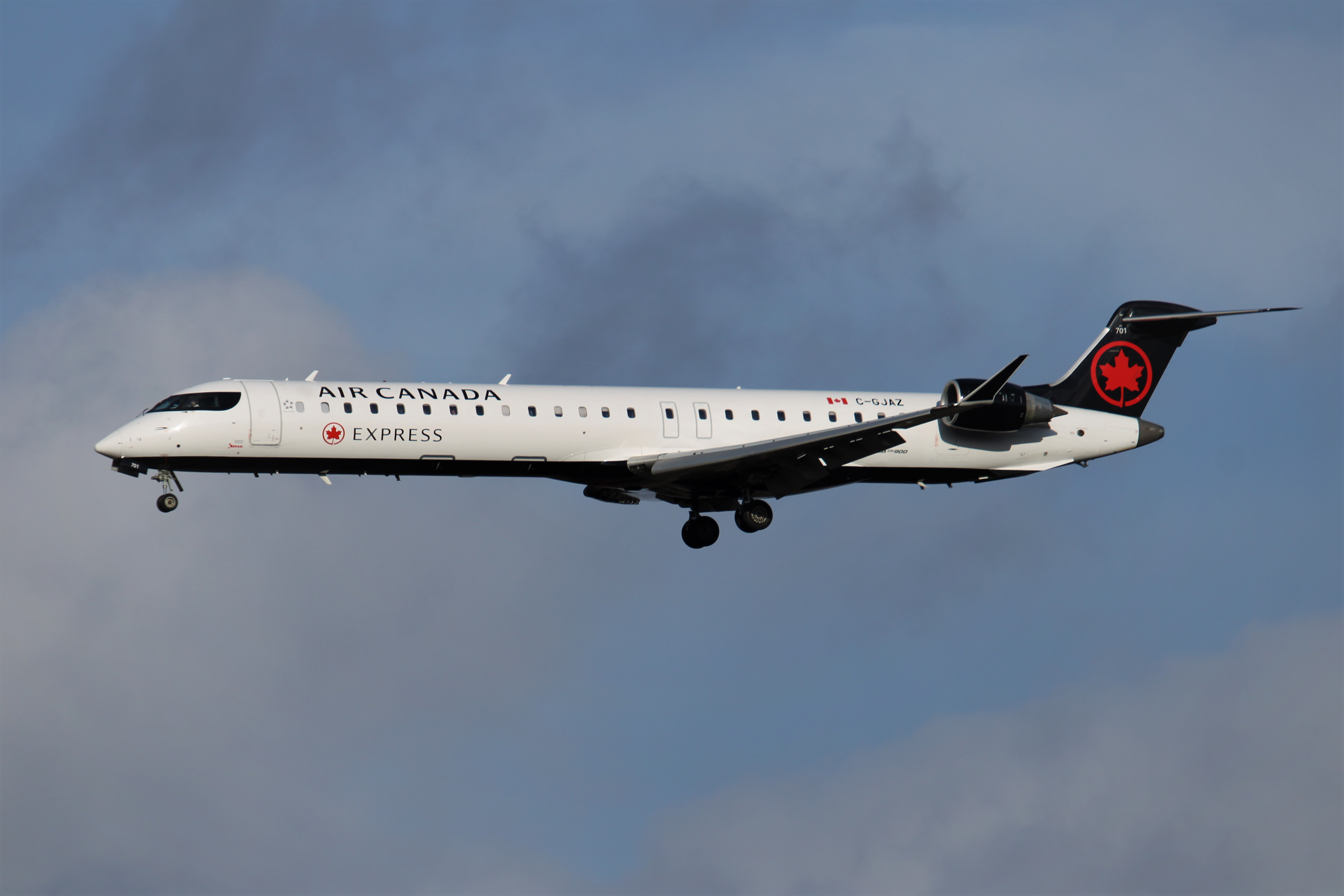
Bombardier CRJ900

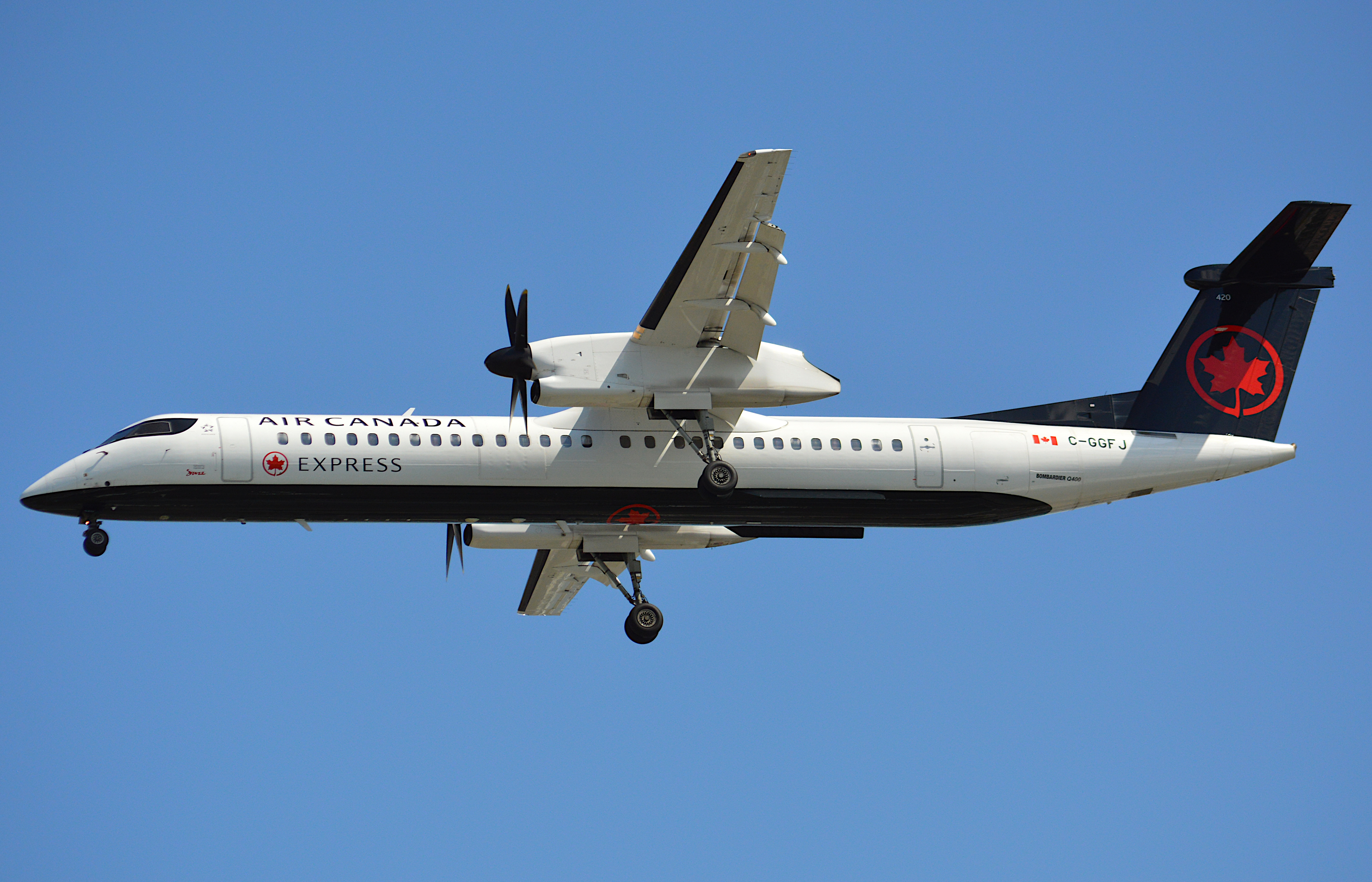
De Havilland Canada Dash 8-400 operated by Jazz Aviation

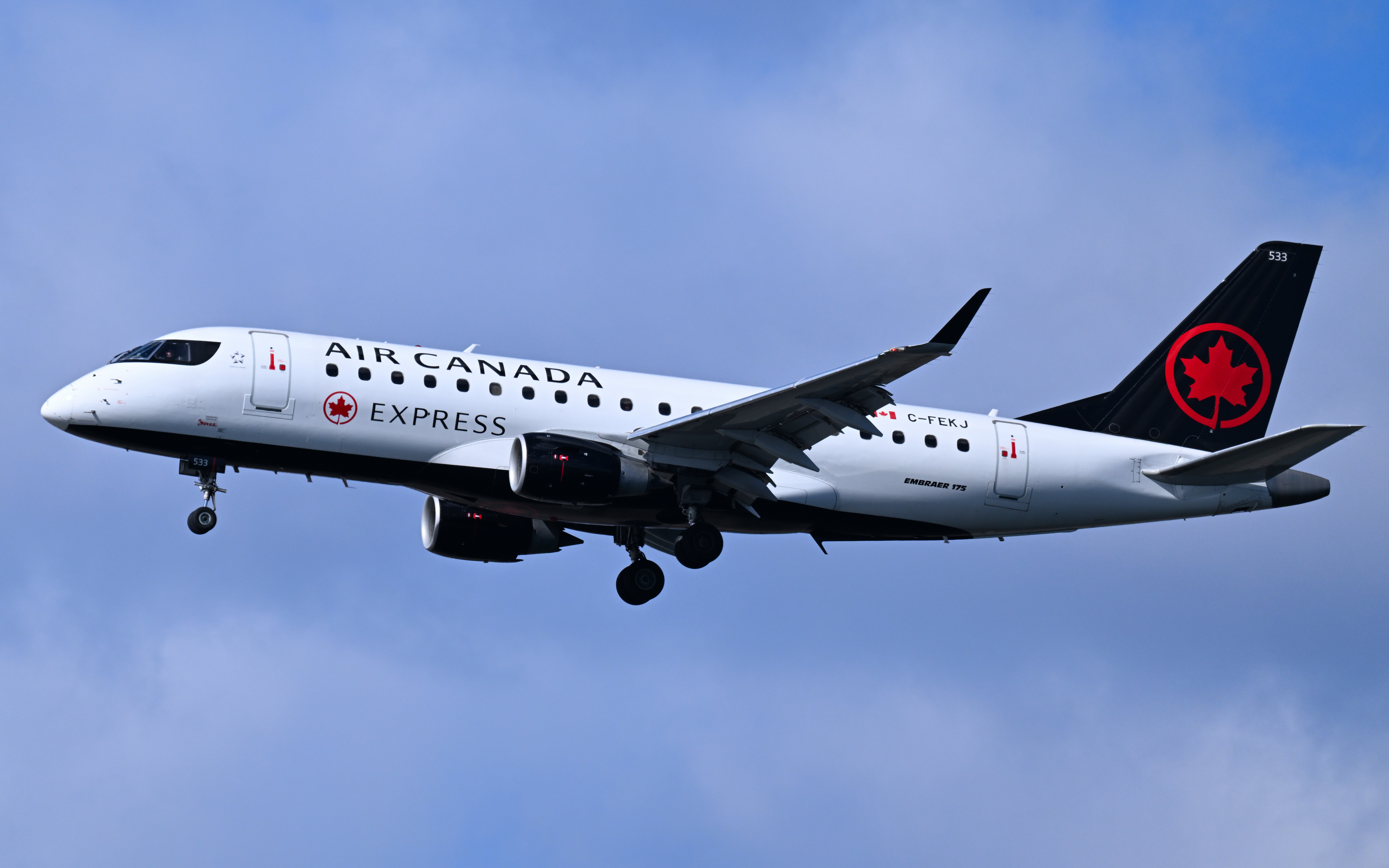
Embraer 175

=== Historical fleet ===
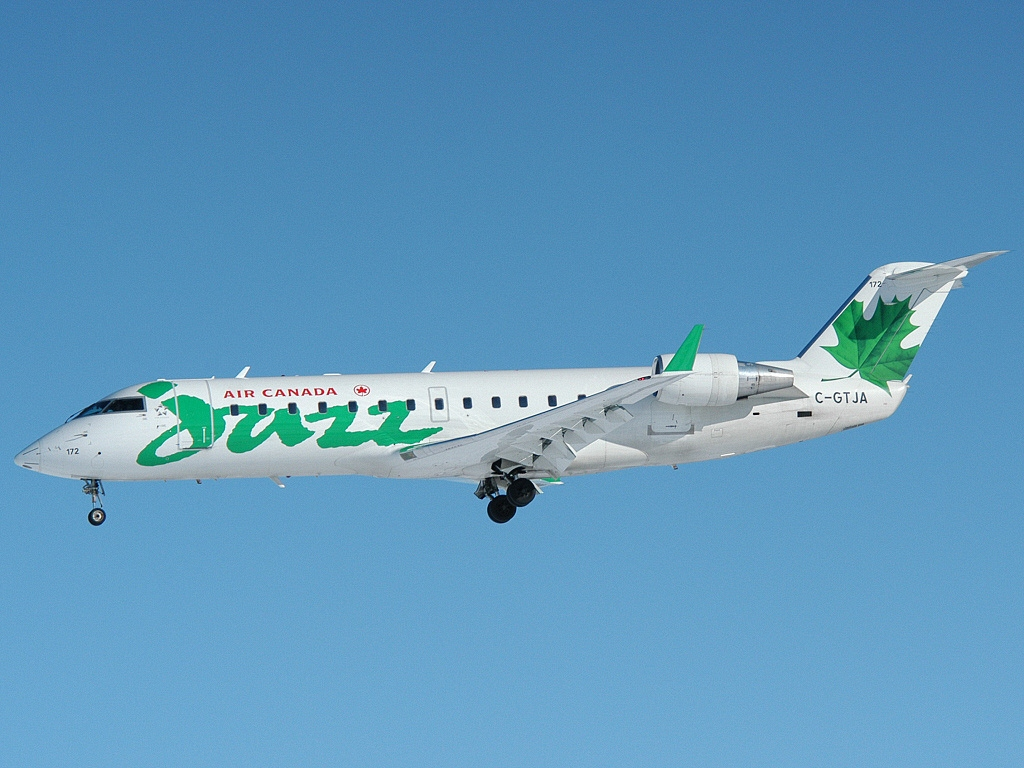
Air Canada Jazz CRJ200 in a former livery

The Air Canada Express brand, through its various regional and commuter airline partners, operated a variety of turbofan and twin turboprop aircraft over the years including the following types:

- Bombardier CRJ100
- Bombardier CRJ200
- Beechcraft 1900D
- De Havilland Canada Dash 8-100
- De Havilland Canada Dash 8-300

== Incidents and accidents ==
- On April 20, 2016, Air Canada Express flight 7804 (EV7804), which was operated by an EVAS Air Beechcraft 1900D (C-FEVA), crashed upon landing at Gander International Airport. At the time of arrival, the weather conditions were described as heavy snow, and visibility at the airport was 1/8 statute mile (200 m). The flight, arriving from Goose Bay, touched down right of the runway centerline of runway 03, and immediately veered right. The nose gear of the aircraft struck a snow windrow and subsequently collapsed, causing 7 out of the 8 blades to separate from the engines. The right side of the fuselage was punctured by a propeller blade. Of the 14 occupants onboard, everyone survived, and 3 people sustained minor injuries.
- On December 28, 2024, a De Havilland Canada DHC-8-400 operating as Flight 2259 by PAL Airlines, had its left main landing gear collapse on landing at Halifax Stanfield International Airport. The wing also caught on fire, but all 77 people on board survived without serious injuries. The aircraft was substantially damaged.
- On March 22, 2026, a Bombardier CRJ-900, operated by Jazz Aviation as Air Canada Express Flight 8646, collided with a fire truck on landing at New York's LaGuardia Airport, completely ripping off the nose section of the aircraft. Both pilots died and 41 people were injured in the accident. The 2 occupants of the fire truck were also injured.

== See also ==
- List of Air Canada destinations
