= Cayo Largo del Sur =

Cayo Largo del Sur Cayo Largo
- Resort island and village
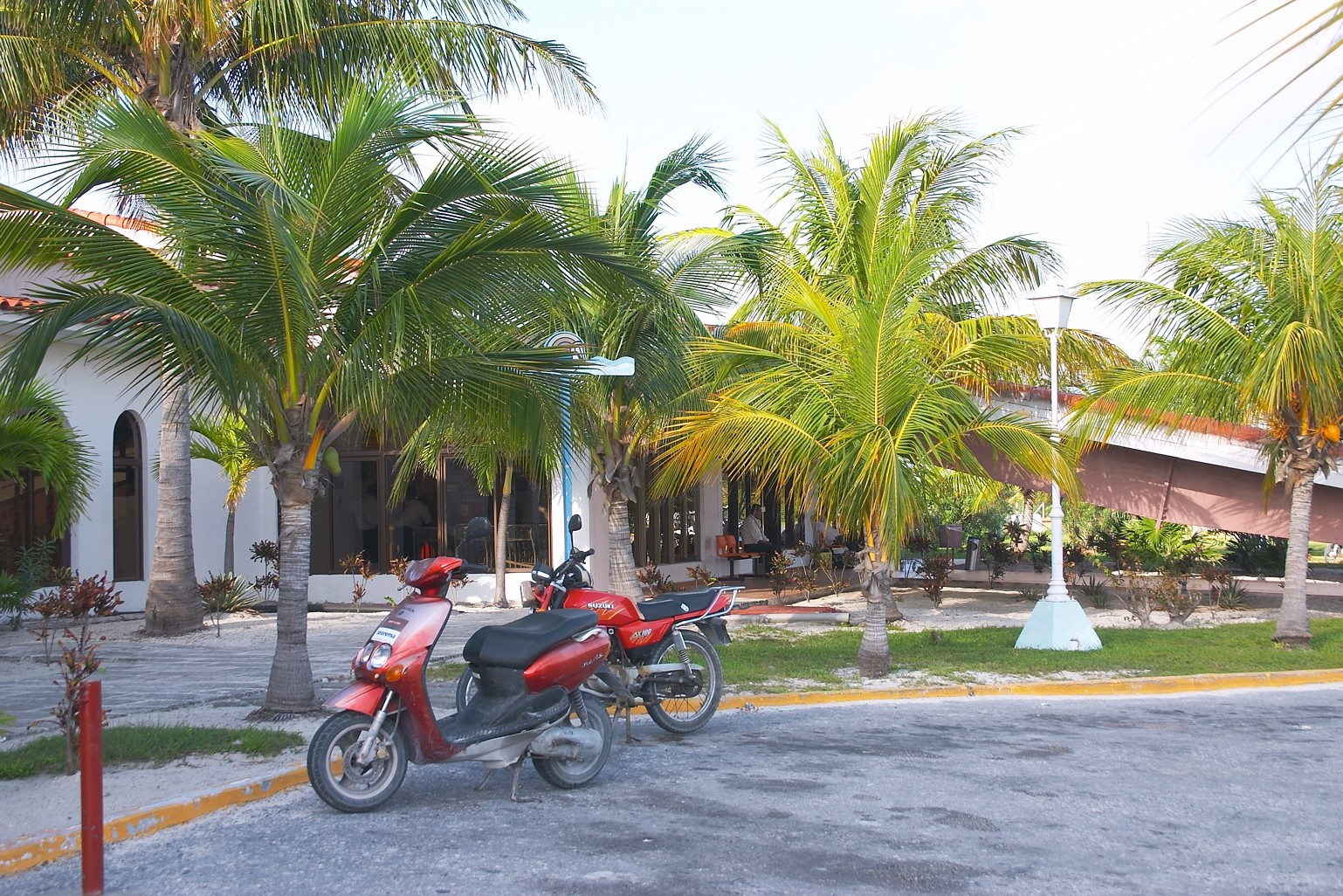
- Cayo Largo Airport

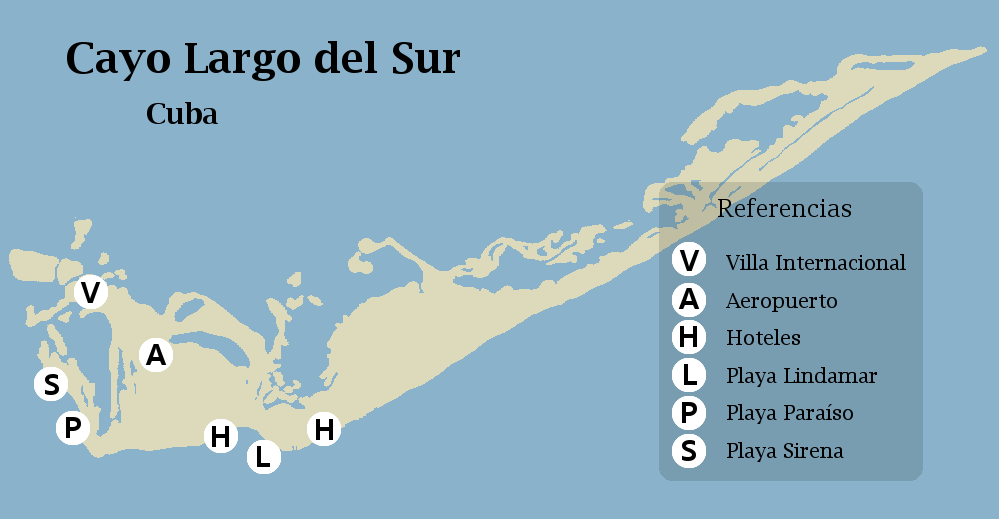
- Map of the island

- Location of Cayo Largo in Cuba
- Coordinates: 21°38′00″N 81°28′00″W
- Country: Cuba
- Province: Isla de la Juventud
- Municipality: Isla de la Juventud (seat: Nueva Gerona)
- Elevation: 5 m (16 ft)
- Time zone: UTC-5 (EST)

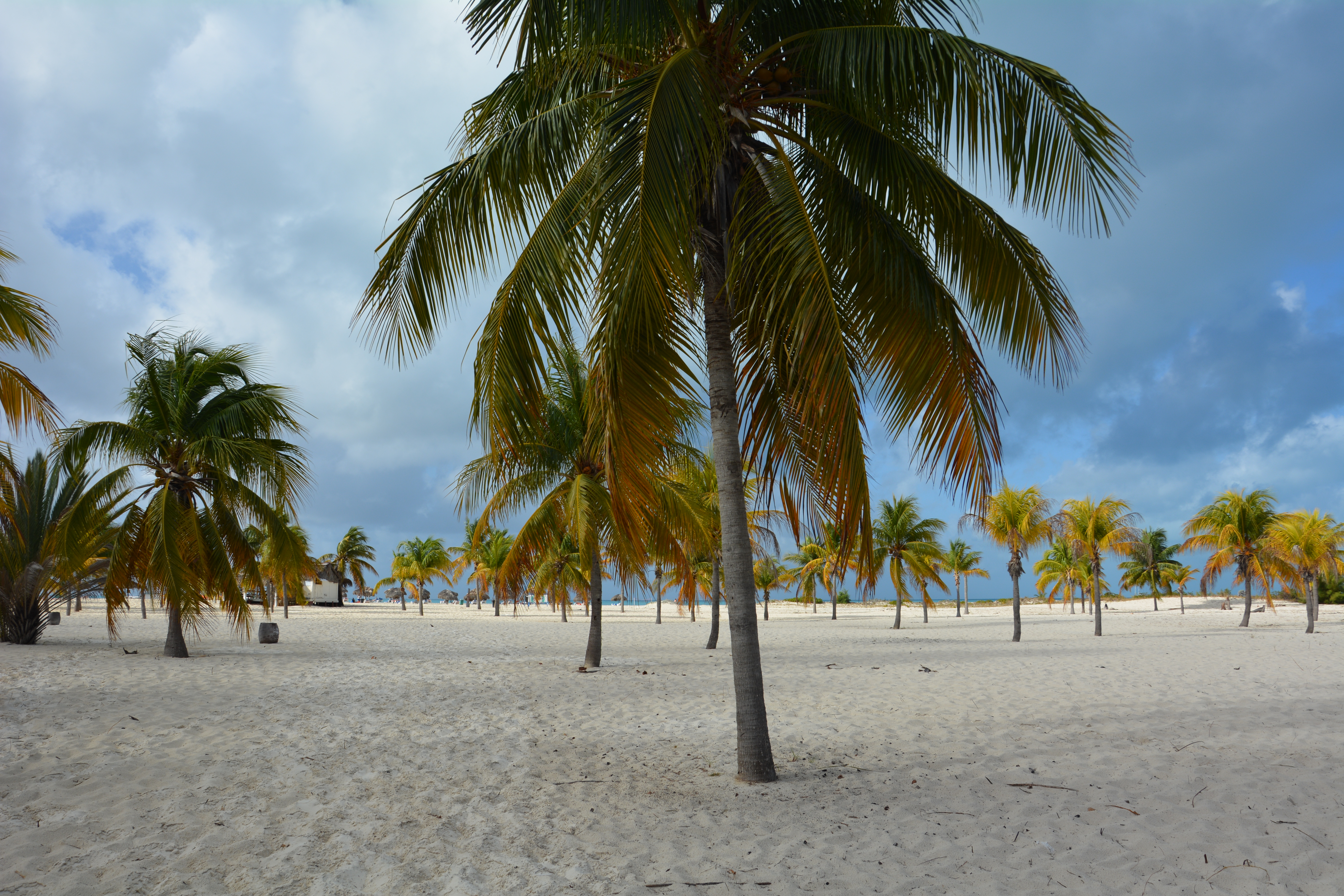
Playa Sirena, a popular beach located on western side of the island

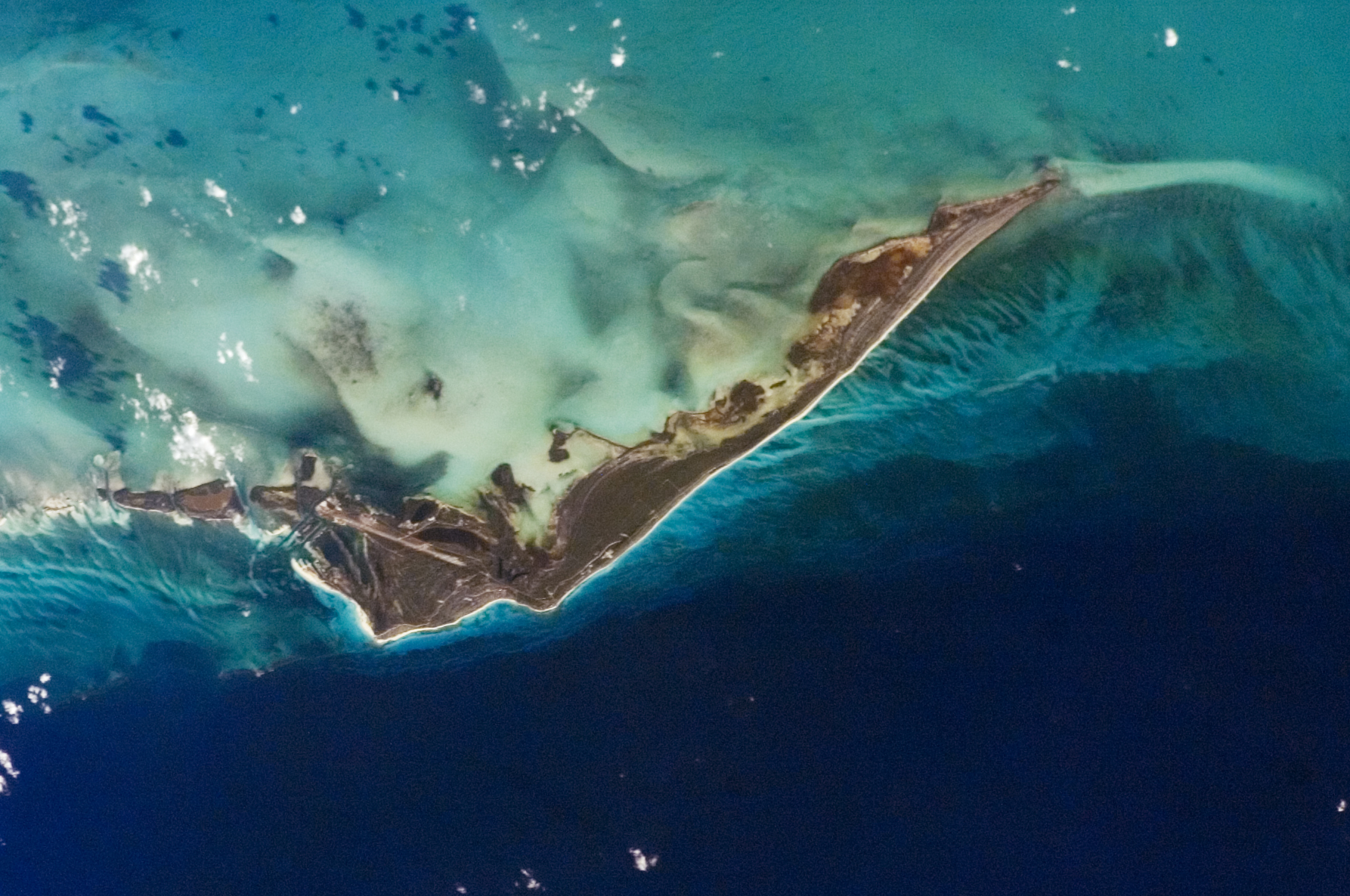
Shallow water surrounds Cayo Largo, evidenced by the lighter shade of blue

Cayo Largo del Sur, or simply Cayo Largo ("Long Key”), is a small resort island in Cuba, off the south coast of the northwestern part of the main island in the Caribbean Sea. The cay is about 25 kilometers (16 mi) long and 3 kilometers (1.9 mi) wide and is the second largest island in the Canarreos Archipelago. Cayo Largo is part of the special municipality of Isla de la Juventud.

== History ==
Christopher Columbus may have visited the island on his 1494 second voyage. Pirates also likely used the island as a base.

== Geography ==
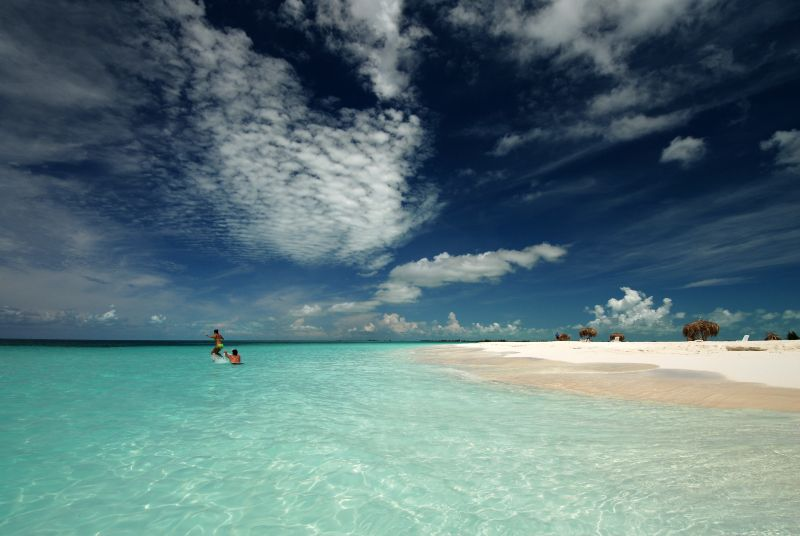
A beach on Cayo Largo

Cayo Largo is a limestone island, formed over millions of years from the remains of marine organisms, such as the ones that build coral reefs. Living coral reefs form one more attraction for tourists on this island, although coral bleaching has stressed some reef communities in the Caribbean. The northern coast of Cayo Largo consists largely of mangroves and salt pans. While the water south of the island appears clear enough to reveal the underlying ocean floor, the water on the north side of the island is cloudy. This cloudy water indicates that sediment is washing off the land surface and into the water or is being stirred up from the shallow sea floor.

== Climate and weather ==
Month	Average	Jan	Feb	Mar	Apr	May	Jun	Jul	Aug	Sep	Oct	Nov	Dec
Temp (C)	26	23	23	25	26	27	28	29	29	28	27	26	24

In November 2001, the entire island was covered by a storm surge in Hurricane Michelle. In November 2024, the island was evacuated prior to the arrival of Hurricane Rafael.

== Tourism ==
Pristine beaches, scuba diving, and wildlife draw tourists to the island, but no people live there permanently; locals who work in the hotels stay for about 20 days, then return to their families on nearby islands. There are five all-inclusive resort hotels on the island. Flights from Argentina, Italy, and Canada serve the island.

Cayo Largo is noted its extensive white sand beaches, such as the western beaches Playa Sirena and Playa Paraíso, attracting visitors for sunbathing, swimming, snorkeling, and other leisure activities. Typically, the fine white sand is packed hard on the surf's edge and allows easy walking. These beaches are a kilometre apart, and one may easily walk between them when the tide is not full. Sirena offers full service facilities for tourists. A shuttle "train" service that used to take tourists from the resorts to these beaches stopped operating for some time, but was restarted in 2022. (taxis are still available for this purpose). Paraiso offers one of the finest undeveloped beaches in the world. Access to the beach may be curtailed during turtle egg laying season. The beach has water sports related to the hotels, a restaurant, dolphin attraction, docks for catamaran trips. The lee side of the beach features tidal flats where many very large starfish congregate and other tropical fish are easily viewed.

The island’s clear waters and surrounding coral reefs are popular with scuba divers, and a range of resorts and accommodation options support year-round tourism.

Nudism is tolerated in Cayo Largo and is practiced on the periphery of the resorts in designated areas, and on the many desolate stretches of beaches (20 km) on this island.

== Transport ==
Vilo Acuña Airport (IATA: CYO; ICAO: MUCL) is an international airport on the island.

A large catamaran style ferry provides surface transportation.

Flights from Miami were halted in December 2019 due to an October U.S. Department of Transportation ruling that suspended flights from the U.S. to nine airports in Cuba. The policy stopped air service to all Cuban airports except Havana.

On February 20, 2020, damage to the only airport runway forced tourist passengers return to the mainland via boat.
