= Vilo Acuña Airport =

International airport serving Cayo Largo del Sur, Cuba

Vilo Acuña Airport Aeropuerto Internacional Vilo Acuña
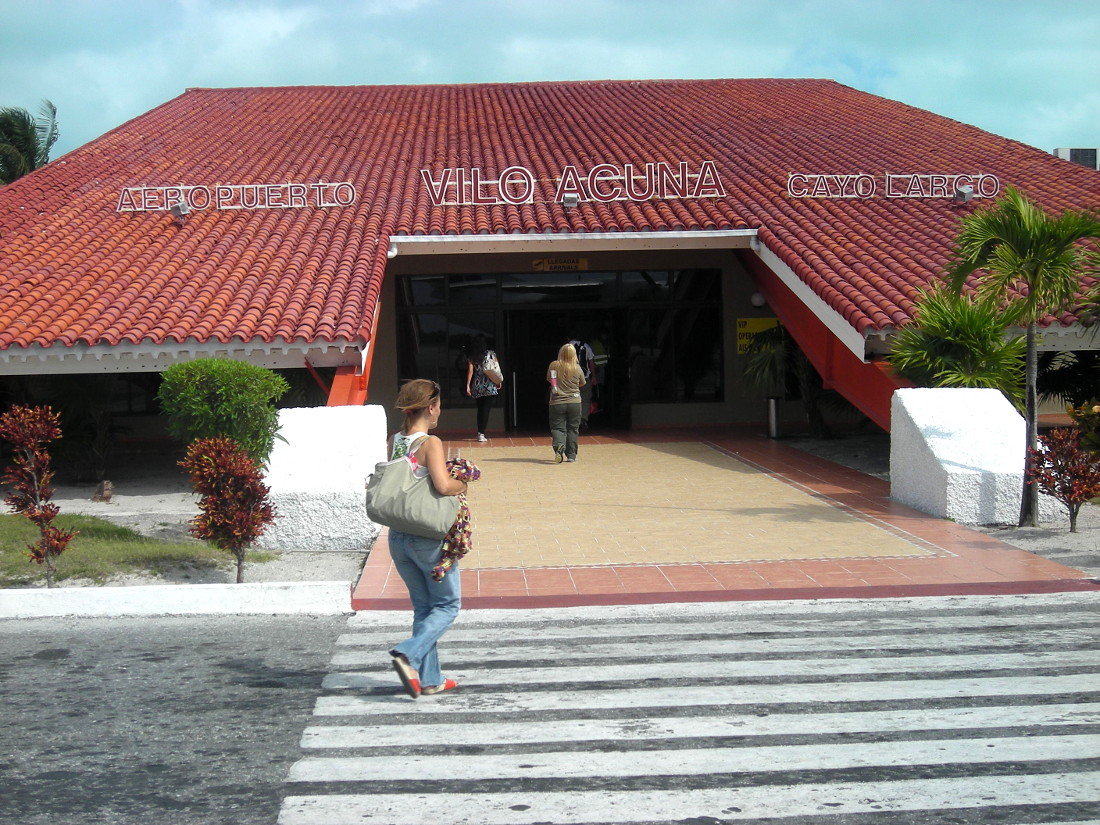
- IATA: CYO; ICAO: MUCL

Summary
- Airport type: Public
- Operator: ECASA
- Serves: Cayo Largo del Sur, Cuba
- Elevation AMSL: 3 m (9.8 ft)
- Coordinates: 21°36′58″N 81°32′44″W

Map
- Location in Cuba

Runways
Direction	Length		Surface
Direction	m	ft	Surface
12/30	3,000	9,843	Asphalt
- Source: Aerodrome chart

Vilo Acuña Airport (Spanish: Aeropuerto Internacional Vilo Acuña) (IATA: CYO, ICAO: MUCL) is an international airport serving Cayo Largo del Sur, a small coral island in Cuba. It is located within the special municipality (municipio especial) of Isla de la Juventud.

== Facilities ==
The airport resides at an elevation of 3 m (9.8 ft) above mean sea level. It has one runway designated 12/30 with an asphalt surface measuring 3,000 m × 45 m (9,843 ft × 148 ft).

On February 20, 2020, damages to the only airport runway forced tourist passengers to return to the mainland via boat.
